= Frank Nobilo =

New Zealand professional golfer (born 1960)

Personal information
- Full name: Frank Ivan Joseph Nobilo
- Nationality: New Zealand
- Born: 14 May 1960 (age 66) Auckland, New Zealand
- Height: 1.83 m (6 ft 0 in)
- Children: Bianca Nobilo

Career
- Sport: Golf
- Turned professional: 1979
- Former tours: PGA Tour; European Tour; PGA Tour of Australasia
- Professional wins: 14
- Highest ranking: 21 (6 July 1997)

Number of wins by tour
- PGA Tour: 1
- European Tour: 5
- Asian Tour: 1
- PGA Tour of Australasia: 2
- Other: 5

Best results in major championships
- Masters Tournament: 4th: 1996
- PGA Championship: T8: 1996
- U.S. Open: T9: 1994
- The Open Championship: T10: 1997

Achievements and awards
- Companion of the New Zealand Order of Merit: 1998

Frank Ivan Joseph Nobilo CNZM (born 14 May 1960) is a New Zealand professional golfer. Nobilo had a successful playing career, winning 14 pro tournaments around the world. He was at his peak during the mid-1990s when he also produced strong finishes in all four major championships. Since his 2003 retirement, Nobilo has worked as a television announcer for golf events.

== Early life and amateur career ==
Nobilo was born in Auckland, of Italian and Croatian descent, and is the great-grandson of an Italian pirate. At birth, his right leg was shorter than his left, causing him ongoing back problems. He was educated at St Peter's College in Auckland where he was persuaded to play golf by schoolmates (Chris Treen and Mark Lewis). Nobilo preferred to play Rugby league for Glenora over Rugby Union for St Peter's, which was "a bone of contention" with the school, and with his parents.

I got a bit of grief because I preferred league over rugby then and I was a bit more of a rebel. I used to catch the train to and from school and it took about 30–40 minutes. My mum said it drove her crazy because I missed it often and my parents were living in Glen Eden and I would end up in Henderson and they'd have to come and collect me.

In 1978, Nobilo won the New Zealand Amateur at 18, the second-youngest winner of this title.

== Professional career ==
Nobilo turned professional in November 1979. His first professional win came in 1982 at the New South Wales PGA Championship on the PGA Tour of Australasia.

Nobilo joined the European Tour in 1985 as a full-time player, having played in selected events in 1982 and 1983. He recorded his first win on the Tour in the 1988 PLM Open (not to be confused with the KLM Open). Nobilo subsequently won four other European Tour events and finished inside the top 50 on the Order of Merit every season from 1988 to 1996, with a best of 14th place in 1993.

After strong performances in all the majors, including a 4th-place finish in the Masters Tournament and a tie for 8th in the PGA Championship, Nobilo left Europe at the end of 1996 and joined the United States–based PGA Tour for the following season. He won the Greater Greensboro Chrysler Classic during his rookie season, which proved to be his only win on that tour. He has featured in the top 50 of the Official World Golf Rankings.

One week after his marriage to Selena in 1998, Nobilo was struck above the left eye by an errant tee shot at the Lake Nona Golf & Country Club in Central Florida. The injury required 30 stitches, and affected his play afterwards.

Nobilo played for the International Team in each of the first three Presidents Cups (1994, 1996, 1998). He contributed significantly to the international appeal of the event when in 1998 and paired with fellow kiwi Greg Turner he holed a 70-foot putt on the final green to defeat the American pairing. On 2 October 2008, International Presidents Cup team captain Greg Norman announced that Frank Nobilo would serve as his assistant captain for the 2009 Presidents Cup 6–11 October 2009 at Harding Park Golf Course in San Francisco.

On 9 October 2007, it was reported that Nobilo had announced he would be coming out of retirement, and attempt to gain a card for the U.S. PGA Tour through qualifying school. However, in a statement issued on the Golf Channel's website, Nobilo denied the report: "I have not, nor did I have any intention of entering this years PGA Tour Qualifying school."

=== Broadcasting career ===
Upon retiring from tournament golf in 2003, Nobilo joined the Golf Channel for studio coverage. He has been a key member of the Live From team at the major championships. From 2012 to 2014, he occasionally filled in for Peter Jacobsen on NBC's golf coverage (NBC and Golf Channel are corporate siblings).

In 2015, Nobilo joined CBS's golf coverage, replacing Peter Oosterhuis. Like Oosterhuis did, he worked only the cable coverage of about half of CBS's events, while working on the network coverage of the other half, including the Masters and PGA Championship. He remained on Live From on Golf Channel but will no longer be allowed to fill in on NBC. Nobilo made his CBS debut at the 2015 Phoenix Open.

He was also a commentator in Rory McIlroy PGA Tour and EA Sports PGA Tour video games, released in 2015 and 2023, respectively.

== Personal life ==
In 1998, Nobilo and his wife, Selena, married. He has a daughter, former CNN journalist Bianca Nobilo, who also speaks Italian and Croatian, from a previous marriage.

Nobilo works as an ambassador for The House of Nobilo, one of New Zealand's leading wineries and founded by one of his relatives Nikola Nobilo.

== Awards and honors ==
Frank Nobilo was appointed a Companion of the New Zealand Order of Merit, for services to golf, in the 1998 Queen's Birthday Honours.

== Amateur wins ==
- 1978 New Zealand Amateur
- 1979 New Zealand Under-25 Stroke Play Championship

== Professional wins (14) ==
=== PGA Tour wins (1) ===
No.	Date	Tournament	Winning score	Margin of victory	Runner-up
1	27 Apr 1997	Greater Greensboro Chrysler Classic	−14 (69-69-69-67=274)	Playoff	(United States) Brad Faxon

PGA Tour playoff record (1–0)

No.	Year	Tournament	Opponent	Result
1	1997	Greater Greensboro Chrysler Classic	(United States) Brad Faxon	Won with par on first extra hole

=== European Tour wins (5) ===
No.	Date	Tournament	Winning score	Margin of victory	Runner(s)-up
1	14 Aug 1988	PLM Open	−10 (63-68-71-68=270)	1 stroke	(England) Howard Clark
2	15 Sep 1991	Trophée Lancôme	−13 (65-68-69-65=267)	1 stroke	(Australia) Ian Baker-Finch, (Australia) Peter Fowler, (England) David Gilford, (England) Jamie Spence
3	7 Mar 1993	Turespaña Open Mediterrania	−9 (71-69-67-72=279)	1 stroke	(Scotland) Gordon Brand Jnr, (Northern Ireland) David Feherty
4	2 Jul 1995	BMW International Open	−16 (67-69-69-67=272)	2 strokes	(Germany) Bernhard Langer, (Sweden) Jarmo Sandelin
5	2 Jun 1996	Deutsche Bank Open TPC of Europe	−18 (65-69-72-64=270)	1 stroke	(Scotland) Colin Montgomerie

=== Asian PGA Tour wins (1) ===
No.	Date	Tournament	Winning score	Margin of victory	Runner-up
1	7 Dec 1997	Andersen Consulting Hong Kong Open	−17 (67-66-66-68=267)	5 strokes	(South Korea) Kang Wook-soon

=== Asia Golf Circuit wins (1) ===
No.	Date	Tournament	Winning score	Margin of victory	Runner-up
1	26 Mar 1994	Sampoerna Indonesia Open	−15 (69-67-68-69=273)	3 strokes	(United States) Jerry Smith

Asia Golf Circuit playoff record (0–1)

No.	Year	Tournament	Opponents	Result
1	1994	Benson & Hedges Malaysian Open	(Malaysia) Periasamy Gunasegaran, (Sweden) Joakim Haeggman	Haeggman won with par on eighth extra hole Nobilo eliminated by par on sixth hole

=== PGA Tour of Australia wins (2) ===
No.	Date	Tournament	Winning score	Margin of victory	Runner-up
1	26 Sep 1982	Reschs Pilsner New South Wales PGA Championship	−13 (72-74-67-66=279)	1 stroke	(Australia) Lyndsay Stephen
2	31 Dec 1985 (1986 season)	Nissan-Mobil New Zealand PGA Championship	−8 (72-67-70-71=280)	2 strokes	(Australia) Brett Ogle

=== Other wins (4) ===
- 1987 New Zealand PGA Championship
- 1995 Sarazen World Open
- 1996 Subaru Sarazen World Open
- 1997 Mexican Open

== Results in major championships ==
Tournament	1986	1987	1988	1989	1990	1991	1992	1993	1994	1995	1996	1997	1998	1999	2000
Masters Tournament										CUT	4	46	CUT		
U.S. Open									T9	T10	T13	T36	T40		CUT
The Open Championship	T59				T16	T73		T51	T11	T68	T27	T10	CUT	T18	
PGA Championship							T33	T22	T47	CUT	T8	T29	CUT		

Top 10
Did not play

CUT = missed the half-way cut
"T" = tied

=== Summary ===
Tournament	Wins	2nd	3rd	Top-5	Top-10	Top-25	Events	Cuts made
Masters Tournament	0	0	0	1	1	1	4	2
U.S. Open	0	0	0	0	2	3	6	5
The Open Championship	0	0	0	0	1	4	10	9
PGA Championship	0	0	0	0	1	2	7	5
Totals	0	0	0	1	5	10	27	21

- Most consecutive cuts made – 9 (1986 Open Championship – 1994 PGA)
- Longest streak of top-10s – 1 (five times)

== Results in The Players Championship ==
Tournament	1995	1996	1997	1998	1999	2000	2001	2002
The Players Championship	CUT	T60	CUT	T63	T71			CUT

Did not play

CUT = missed the halfway cut
"T" indicates a tie for a place

== Results in World Golf Championships ==
Tournament	1999
Match Play	
Championship	
Invitational	38

Did not play

== Team appearances ==
Amateur

- Eisenhower Trophy (representing New Zealand): 1978
- Nomura Cup (representing New Zealand): 1979

Professional

- World Cup (representing New Zealand): 1982, 1987, 1988, 1990, 1991, 1992, 1993, 1994, 1995, 1998, 1999, 2000
- Alfred Dunhill Cup (representing New Zealand): 1985, 1986, 1987, 1989, 1990, 1992, 1994, 1995, 1996, 1997, 1998
- Presidents Cup (International team): 1994, 1996, 1998 (winners)
- Alfred Dunhill Challenge (representing Australasia): 1995
- UBS Warburg Cup (representing the Rest of the World): 2001

== See also ==
- 2000 PGA Tour Qualifying School graduates
- List of alumni of St Peter's College, Auckland
