= Greg Turner =

New Zealand professional golfer

Personal information
- Full name: Gregory James Turner
- Born: 21 February 1963 (age 63) Dunedin, New Zealand
- Height: 1.88 m (6 ft 2 in)
- Weight: 83 kg (183 lb; 13.1 st)
- Relatives: Brian Turner (brother); Glenn Turner (brother); Sukhi Turner (sister-in-law)
- Golf career
- Sport: Golf
- College: University of Oklahoma
- Turned professional: 1984
- Current tour: European Seniors Tour
- Former tours: European Tour; PGA Tour of Australasia; Champions Tour
- Professional wins: 12
- Highest ranking: 59 (9 May 1999)

Number of wins by tour
- European Tour: 4
- PGA Tour of Australasia: 6
- Other: 2

Best results in major championships
- Masters Tournament: DNP
- PGA Championship: T16: 1999
- U.S. Open: DNP
- The Open Championship: T7: 1996

Achievements and awards
- PGA Tour of Australia Rookie of the Year: 1985

Gregory James Turner (born 21 February 1963) is a New Zealand professional golfer.

== Early life and amateur career ==
Turner was born in Dunedin and attended the University of Oklahoma in the United States on a golf scholarship.

== Professional career ==
Turner spent most of his career on the PGA Tour of Australasia and the European Tour. Turner won four tournaments on the European Tour and achieved a career best ranking of 18th on the European Tour Order of Merit in 1997. He has represented New Zealand in international competitions many times and was one of Peter Thomson's two wild card selections (along with Frank Nobilo for the winning International Team in the 1998 Presidents Cup.

Since retiring from tournament golf, Turner has set up a golf course design and corporate hospitality business. He was also active in founding the Golf Tour of New Zealand, a series of tournaments in New Zealand for both amateur and professional golfers.

== Personal life ==
Turner's brothers are former national cricket captain Glenn Turner and award-winning poet Brian Turner. His sister-in-law, Sukhi Turner, is a former mayor of Dunedin.

At the age of 15, Turner's son Jack won the club championship of the family's home club "The Hills".

== Professional wins (12) ==
=== European Tour wins (4) ===
No.	Date	Tournament	Winning score	Margin of victory	Runner-up
1	3 Aug 1986	Scandinavian Enterprise Open	−18 (69-62-69-70=270)	Playoff	(United States) Craig Stadler
2	23 May 1993	Lancia Martini Italian Open	−21 (65-70-68-64=267)	1 stroke	(Argentina) José Cóceres
3	26 Mar 1995	Turespaña Open de Baleares	−14 (74-65-67-68=274)	2 strokes	(Italy) Costantino Rocca
4	21 Sep 1997	One 2 One British Masters	−13 (68-71-66-70=275)	1 stroke	(Scotland) Colin Montgomerie

European Tour playoff record (1–2)

No.	Year	Tournament	Opponent	Result
1	1986	Scandinavian Enterprise Open	(United States) Craig Stadler	Won with birdie on first extra hole
2	1993	Roma Masters	(France) Jean van de Velde	Lost to par on third extra hole
3	1999	Novotel Perrier Open de France	(South Africa) Retief Goosen	Lost to par on second extra hole

=== Asia Golf Circuit wins (1) ===
No.	Date	Tournament	Winning score	Margin of victory	Runners-up
1	16 Mar 1986	Singapore Open	−13 (65-70-65-71=271)	4 strokes	(Canada) Tony Grimes, (United States) Duffy Waldorf

Asia Golf Circuit playoff record (0–1)

No.	Year	Tournament	Opponent	Result
1	1985	Singapore Open	(Taiwan) Chen Tze-ming	Lost to birdie on first extra hole

=== PGA Tour of Australasia wins (6) ===
No.	Date	Tournament	Winning score	Margin of victory	Runner(s)-up
1	30 Dec 1984	New Zealand PGA Championship	−6 (71-69-70-72=282)	3 strokes	(New Zealand) Frank Nobilo
2	5 Nov 1989	AMP New Zealand Open	−7 (70-72-69-66=277)	6 strokes	(United States) Richard Gilkey
3	9 Dec 1990	Johnnie Walker Australian Classic	−8 (69-68-71-69=276)	4 strokes	(Australia) Rodger Davis
4	13 Jan 1991	Daikyo Palm Meadows Cup	−17 (74-62-67-68=271)	4 strokes	(Australia) Greg Norman
5	14 Dec 1997	AMP Air New Zealand Open (2)	−10 (69-69-71-69=278)	7 strokes	(Scotland) Andrew Coltart, (France) Jean-Louis Guépy, (Australia) Lucas Parsons
6	12 Dec 1999	Australian PGA Championship	−10 (68-68-70-72=278)	2 strokes	(Australia) Shane Tait

=== Other wins (1) ===
- 1985 Fiji Open

== Results in major championships ==
Tournament	1986	1987	1988	1989	1990	1991	1992	1993	1994	1995	1996	1997	1998	1999	2000	2001
The Open Championship	T35				CUT	CUT	CUT	T39	T20		T7	T51	T15	CUT		CUT
PGA Championship													CUT	T16	CUT	

Note: Turner only played in The Open Championship and the PGA Championship.

Top 10
Did not play

CUT = missed the half-way cut
"T" indicates a tie for a place

== Results in World Golf Championships ==
Tournament	1999
Match Play	
Championship	
Invitational	T21

Did not play

"T" = Tied

== Team appearances ==
Amateur

- Eisenhower Trophy (representing New Zealand): 1982, 1984

Professional

- World Cup (representing New Zealand): 1985, 1987, 1988, 1989, 1990, 1991, 1992, 1993, 1994, 1998, 2000
- Alfred Dunhill Cup (representing New Zealand): 1986, 1987, 1990, 1992, 1994, 1995, 1996, 1998, 1999, 2000
- Presidents Cup (International Team): 1998 (winners)
- Alfred Dunhill Challenge (representing Australasia): 1995
