= Akihito Yokoyama =

Japanese golfer

Akihito Yokoyama 横山 明仁
Personal information
- Nationality: Japan
- Born: 12 January 1961 (age 65) Tokyo, Japan
- Height: 1.73 m (5 ft 8 in)
- Weight: 69 kg (152 lb; 10.9 st)

Career
- Sport: Golf
- Status: Professional
- Former tour: Japan Golf Tour
- Professional wins: 4

Number of wins by tour
- Japan Golf Tour: 3
- Other: 1

Akihito Yokoyama (横山 明仁, Yokoyama Akihito; born 12 January 1961) is a Japanese professional golfer, most successful in the 1980s and 1990s.

== Professional career ==
Yokoyama played on the Japan Golf Tour, winning three times. He is sponsored by ISPS.

== Professional wins (4) ==
=== PGA of Japan Tour wins (3) ===
No.	Date	Tournament	Winning score	Margin of victory	Runner(s)-up
1	4 Sep 1988	Kanto Open	−2 (70-66-67-75=278)	6 strokes	(Japan) Tomohiro Maruyama, (Japan) Nobumitsu Yuhara
2	21 May 1989	Pepsi Ube Kosan Open	−13 (67-69-67=203) (Note: Shortened to 54 holes due to weather.)	Playoff	(Japan) Yoshimi Niizeki
3	4 Aug 1991	NST Niigata Open	−10 (73-67-69-69=278)	2 strokes	(Japan) Hideki Kase, (Japan) Koichi Suzuki

PGA of Japan Tour playoff record (1–1)

No.	Year	Tournament	Opponent	Result
1	1989	Pepsi Ube Kosan Open	(Japan) Yoshimi Niizeki	Won with bogey on second extra hole
2	1990	Bridgestone Open	(Japan) Saburo Fujiki	Lost to birdie on first extra hole

=== Other wins (1) ===
- 1997 Kanto Open
