= Nikkei Cup =

Nikkei Cup Torakichi Nakamura Memorial
Tournament information
- Location: Kasama, Ibaraki, Japan
- Established: 1985
- Course: Fuji Country Club
- Par: 72
- Length: 7,072 yards (6,467 m)
- Tour: Japan Golf Tour
- Format: Stroke play
- Prize fund: ¥110,000,000
- Month played: October
- Final year: 1998

Tournament record score
- Aggregate: 268 Toru Suzuki (1994); 268 Masashi Ozaki (1998)
- To par: −20 as above

Final champion
- (Japan) Mitsutaka Kusakabe
- Location in Japan Location in the Ibaraki Prefecture

The Nikkei Cup, also known as the Torakichi Nakamura Memorial tournament, was a professional golf tournament that was held in Japan from 1985 to 1998. It was an event on the Japan Golf Tour and played at a variety of courses in Japan. It was dedicated in recognition of the achievements of Torakichi Nakamura.

== Winners ==
Year	Winner	Score	To par	Margin of victory	Runner(s)-up	Venue
Nikkei Cup Torakichi Nakamura Memorial
1998	(Japan) Mitsutaka Kusakabe	280	−8	1 stroke	(Japan) Masashi Ozaki	Fuji (Dejima)
1997	(Taiwan) Yeh Chang-ting	272	−16	Playoff	(Japan) Tsukasa Watanabe	Fuji (Dejima)
1996	(Japan) Hideki Kase	271	−17	2 strokes	(Taiwan) Lin Keng-chi	Fuji (Dejima)
1995	(Japan) Tetsu Nishikawa	269	−19	2 strokes	(Japan) Tomohiro Maruyama	Fuji (Dejima)
Nikkei Cup
1994	(Japan) Toru Suzuki	268	−20	5 strokes	(Japan) Katsunari Takahashi	Mitsui Tomakomai
1993	(Singapore) Samson Gimson	276	−12	2 strokes	(Japan) Hisayuki Sasaki	Mitsui Tomakomai
1992	(Japan) Kiyoshi Murota	280	−8	Playoff	(Japan) Masahiro Kuramoto	Mitsui Tomakomai
1991	(Japan) Naomichi Ozaki (2)	203 (Note: Shortened to 54 holes due to rain.)	−7	Playoff	(Japan) Eiichi Itai	Yasukogen
1990	(Japan) Satoshi Higashi	282	−6	1 stroke	(Japan) Nobuo Serizawa	Mitsui Tomakomai
1989	(Japan) Yoshimi Niizeki	271	−9	Playoff	(Japan) Saburo Fujiki	Izu Nirayama
1988	(Japan) Masashi Ozaki (2)	283	−5	4 strokes	(Japan) Naomichi Ozaki	Sanyo (Yoshii)
1987	(Japan) Nobuo Serizawa	277	−7	1 stroke	(Japan) Masashi Ozaki (Japan) Naomichi Ozaki (Japan) Masahiro Shiota	Gifuseki
1986	(Japan) Masashi Ozaki	268	−20	4 strokes	(Japan) Ikuo Shirahama	Gamou
1985	(Japan) Naomichi Ozaki	270	−14	4 strokes	(Japan) Yoshihisa Iwashita	Kawagoe
