= Hiroshi Makino =

Japanese golfer

Personal information
- Nationality: Japan
- Born: 17 February 1956 (age 70) Tokyo, Japan
- Height: 1.74 m (5 ft 9 in)
- Weight: 68 kg (150 lb; 10.7 st)

Career
- Sport: Golf
- Status: Professional
- Former tour: Japan Golf Tour
- Professional wins: 9

Number of wins by tour
- Japan Golf Tour: 4
- Other: 5

Hiroshi Makino (born 17 February 1956) is a Japanese professional golfer.

== Career ==
Makino played on the Japan Golf Tour, winning four times.

== Professional wins (9) ==
=== PGA of Japan Tour wins (4) ===
No.	Date	Tournament	Winning score	Margin of victory	Runner(s)-up
1	10 Apr 1983	Pocari-Sweat Hakuryuko Open	−6 (69-71-67=207) (Note: Shortened to 54 holes due to weather.)	Playoff	(Japan) Saburo Fujiki, (Japan) Shinsaku Maeda, (Australia) Graham Marsh
2	15 Dec 1991	Daikyo Open	−8 (69-70-67-70=276)	1 stroke	(Canada) Brent Franklin, (Japan) Seiki Okuda
3	22 Mar 1992	Dydo Shizuoka Open	−12 (67-68-70-71=276)	1 stroke	(Japan) Isao Aoki
4	10 May 1992	Fujisankei Classic	−3 (68-67-69-77=281)	3 strokes	(Japan) Saburo Fujiki

PGA of Japan Tour playoff record (1–3)

No.	Year	Tournament	Opponent(s)	Result
1	1983	Pocari-Sweat Hakuryuko Open	(Japan) Saburo Fujiki, (Japan) Shinsaku Maeda, (Australia) Graham Marsh	Won with birdie on second extra hole after three-hole aggregate playoff; Fujiki: −1 (3-4-4=11), Makino: −1 (3-4-4=11), Marsh: +1 (3-5-5=13), Maeda: +2 (4-5-5=14)
2	1987	Pepsi Ube Open	(Taiwan) Chen Tze-ming	Lost to birdie on first extra hole
3	1987	Bridgestone Open	(United States) David Ishii, (Japan) Nobuo Serizawa	Ishii won with birdie on fifth extra hole Makino eliminated by par on first hole
4	1987	Daikyo Open	(Japan) Seiji Ebihara, (Japan) Isamu Sugita	Sugita won with birdie on second extra hole Ebihara eliminated by par on first hole

=== Other wins (4) ===
- 1986 Chiba Open
- 1987 Chiba Open
- 1988 Sapporo Beer Chiba Open
- 1994 Chiba Open

=== Senior wins (1) ===
- Victory Golf Grand Masters

== Team appearances ==
- Four Tours World Championship (representing Japan): 1988, 1991
- Dunhill Cup (representing Japan): 1992
