= Mark Roe =

English professional golfer

Personal information
- Full name: Mark Adrian Roe
- Nationality: England
- Born: 20 February 1963 (age 63) Sheffield, England
- Height: 6 ft 0 in (1.83 m)
- Spouse: Veronique Jacquet Roe

Career
- Sport: Golf
- Turned professional: 1981
- Former tour: European Tour
- Professional wins: 3
- Highest ranking: 40 (14 August 1994)

Number of wins by tour
- European Tour: 3

Best results in major championships
- Masters Tournament: CUT: 1996
- PGA Championship: DNP
- U.S. Open: T13: 1995
- The Open Championship: T16: 1990

Mark Adrian Roe (born 20 February 1963) is an English professional golfer, short game coach and golfing analyst for Sky Sports. Roe won worldwide respect for the way he handled being disqualified from the 2003 Open Championship for a scorecard error.

Roe played for 22 years and 524 events on the European Tour between 1985 and 2006, winning three tournaments and over £2 million in prize money. He reached number 40 in the world rankings. Later, he achieved success as a short game coach, working with 3 major champions and two world No 1 golfers. He is currently a highly respected analyst and golfing pundit for Sky Sports and continues to coach private clients around the world.

== Early life and amateur career ==
In 1963, Roe was born in Sheffield. At school he was a gymnast, trampolinist, and spring board and high-board diving champion but suffered a perforated eardrum, and while convalescing he took up golf after caddying for his father Gordon. As an amateur, Roe was a member of the England and Great Britain Boy international golf team.

== Professional career ==
In 1981, Roe turned professional. In 1985, he became a member of the European Tour having been successful at the final qualifying school at his fourth attempt. Roe won three times on the tour, his first victory was wire-to-wire defeating José María Olazábal by a single shot to win the 1989 Massimo Dutti Catalan Open and his best season on the European Tour was 9th in the Order of Merit which he achieved in 1994. In 1992, he won the Peugeot Open de France. He had several other top-10 finishes during the season.

In 1995, Roe was hit on the head by a stray golf ball which resulted in severe headaches. In July 1999 he tore ligaments in the ring and little fingers of his left hand after grabbing the collar of his dog, which resulted in 20 months out of the game.

Roe was just two strokes off the lead after the third round of the 2003 Open Championship when he was disqualified. He and his playing partner, Jesper Parnevik, had failed to swap their scorecards before play, meaning that both players had ended up signing for the wrong scores which resulted in their automatic disqualification. The sport's governing body, The R&A, have since changed the rules, and failure to exchange scorecards no longer results in disqualification. Roe commented at a later date that he "handled the situation in a way that his Father would have been proud of him" and that "he welcomed the rule change so that any other player may not have face to the rollercoaster of emotion that he had to endure on Open Championship Saturday at Royal St George’s in 2003."

In 2006, Roe retired from tournament golf signing off with a 67 on the Old Course at St Andrews in the final round of the Dunhill Links Championship. He now works as a commentator for Sky Sports. He is also a coach, specialising on the short game, and counts Lee Westwood Francesco Molinari, Justin Rose, Nicolas Colsaerts and Ross Fisher amongst on the list of world class players he has helped.

== Professional wins (3) ==
=== European Tour wins (3) ===
No.	Date	Tournament	Winning score	Margin of victory	Runner(s)-up
1	19 Mar 1989	Massimo Dutti Catalan Open	−13 (69-70-69-71=279)	1 stroke	(Scotland) Gordon Brand Jnr, (Scotland) Colin Montgomerie, (Spain) José María Olazábal
2	20 Sep 1992	Trophée Lancôme	−13 (67-69-66-65=267)	2 strokes	(Argentina) Vicente Fernández
3	26 Jun 1994	Peugeot Open de France	−14 (70-71-67-66=274)	1 stroke	(Sweden) Gabriel Hjertstedt

== Results in major championships ==
Tournament	1987	1988	1989	1990	1991	1992	1993	1994	1995	1996	1997	1998	1999	2000	2001	2002	2003
Masters Tournament										CUT							
U.S. Open									T13								
The Open Championship	T17	CUT	T52	T16	CUT	CUT	T24	T67	CUT		CUT				CUT		DQ

Note: Roe never played in the PGA Championship.

Did not play

CUT = missed the half-way cut
DQ = Disqualified
"T" = tied

== Team appearances ==
Amateur

- Jacques Léglise Trophy (representing Great Britain & Ireland): 1980 (winners)

Professional

- World Cup (representing England): 1989, 1994, 1995
- Dunhill Cup (representing England): 1994
