= Hsieh Yu-shu =

Taiwanese professional golfer (born 1960)

Personal information
- Nationality: Taiwan
- Born: 5 November 1960 (age 65)

Career
- Sport: Golf
- Turned professional: 1982
- Former tours: Asia Golf Circuit; Asian Tour
- Professional wins: 15

Number of wins by tour
- Asian Tour: 1 (Asia Golf Circuit)
- Other: 14

Best results in major championships
- Masters Tournament: DNP
- PGA Championship: DNP
- U.S. Open: DNP
- The Open Championship: 1983: 63rd

Hsieh Yu-shu (Chinese: 謝玉樹, born 5 November 1960) is a Taiwanese professional golfer. Though he only won two prominent events, the 1988 Indonesia Open and the 1993 Mercuries Taiwan Masters, he was a consistent contender on the Asia Golf Circuit and Asian PGA Tour in the 1980s and 1990s. He recorded dozens of top-10s and at least a six second-place finishes between the circuits.

== Career ==
In 1982, Hsieh turned professional. He began to have success on the Asia Golf Circuit the following year. He would seriously contend at the March 1983 Singapore Open, shooting consecutive round of 69 (−2) to put himself a shot back of countryman Ho Ming Chung. However he would ultimately finish outside of the Bill Brask – Lu Chien-soon playoff. A month later, he played excellently at his home nation's open, the Taiwan Open. After an opening 77 he shot consecutive rounds of 72 to place himself in the joint third round lead with compatriot Chen Tze-ming. On the difficult Lin Kuo Country Club course, his second and third rounds of even-par were tied for the best of the tournament through Saturday. During the final round, he was two-over par for the day and tied for the lead entering the 18th hole. He had a 2-metre putt on the 72nd hole for par to put him in a playoff with Lu Liang-Huan and Bill Israelson. He missed and finished in solo third. Overall for the year, he finished in second place on the circuit's Order of Merit.

Hsieh's good play qualified him for the 1983 Open Championship. He shot an even-par 71 in the first round at Royal Birkdale. He shot a second round 72 to easily make the cut. Hsieh fell back with a third round 74 but made the third round cut on the number. In the final round, he ballooned to a 78 and finished in 63rd place. Later in the year, he played the World Series of Golf, a limited-field tournament on the PGA Tour. He finished in 38th place.

In 1986 he had an excellent year. On 23 March, he finished runner-up at the Indonesia Open, one behind Frankie Miñoza. Less than a month later, on 19 April, he was in third place at midway point of Korea Open and would ultimately finish second, one behind countryman Tsao Chien-Teng. These performance would help him finish third on the 1986 Order of Merit. The following season, he recorded another runner-up finish, this time at the 1987 Taiwan Open, two back of American Mark Aebli.

These good performances would culminate with his first victory on the Asia Golf Circuit. On 17 March 1988, he shot a second round 62 to take the lead at the Indonesia Open. He then shot a third round 67 to expand his lead to three shots. He started the final round "shakily" with a bogey on the third hole and was in danger of losing the lead. He "quickly settled down," however, with birdies on the 5th and 6th holes. He went bogey-free after the turn and made three birdies to go on and win by six over Mario Siodina. In addition to the sizable gap between him and Siodina, Hsieh defeated third-place finishers Paul Foley and Mark Aebli by 11 shots. Later in the year, in July, he finished in fifth place at the Malaysian Masters, the richest event in Asia outside of the Asia Golf Circuit, four back of fellow Chen Liang-Hsi.

Hsieh played excellently at the 1989 Hong Kong Open. He finished the first round one back of Todd Hamilton. In the second round, he shot a 68 (−2) to tie Hamilton. Though he played, in his words, "too conservative" in the third round, he remained in contention with his third consecutive 68, now one back of Howard Clark. He struggled in the final round but still had a chance to enter a playoff with a final hole birdie. He bogeyed, however, to finish two back. He finished in a tie for fourth with Hamilton, Clark, and Canadian Jean-Louis Lamarre.

In 1990, Hsieh played in the Dunhill Cup, a team event in Scotland, representing his home country of Taiwan. Taiwan played Wales in the first round of the single elimination event. Hsieh's match was against Ian Woosnam. He could not contend with Woosman, who within a year would be Masters champion and number 1 in the world. Woosnam defeated him by seven strokes, 71 to 78. Though Taiwan won one of its matches, they would lose overall to Wales, 2–1.

In the early 1990s, Hsieh sporadically found success on the Asia Golf Circuit and PGA Tour of Australasia. He recorded two top-10s on the Asia Golf Circuit in 1991, at the Philippine Open and Benson and Hedges Malaysian Open. In 1992, he finished solo 5th at the Hong Kong Open; the only players to beat him were Tom Watson, Ronan Rafferty, Bernhard Langer, and Tom Pernice Jr. In October, he once again played well at the Malaysian Masters, an Australasian Tour event, finishing joint runner-up with Anthony Gilligan, two behind Terry Price. In 1993, back on the Asian circuit, he found himself one back of the lead at the Thailand Open entering the fourth round. He faltered in the final round, however, and finish in a tie for 11th. Later in the year, he won the 1993 Mercuries Taiwan Masters, an event outside of the Asia Golf Circuit. The following year he was one back of joint leaders Mike Cunning and Choi Sang-Ho at the midway point on the 1994 Philippine Open. He did not play well on the weekend, however, and dropped to T-36. Later in the season, he recorded top-10s at the Taiwan Open and Korea Open. Much later in 1994, he played well at the Singapore Open on the Australasian Tour. After three rounds, he was three back of Kyi Hla Han, in joint second place. He would ultimately finish in a tie for fourth.

In 1995, the Asian PGA Tour formed and Hsieh soon started playing on it. In 1996, he had his first great success on the Omega Tour, as it was sponsored, recording a runner-up finish to Prayad Marksaeng at the Volvo China Open. The following year, he again recorded another runner-up finish, this time to Christian Peña at the Volvo Masters of Malaysia. In 2000, he recorded three top-tens on the Asian PGA Tour. In June 2001, he recorded another runner-up finish at the Singapore Open, this time one behind Thaworn Wiratchant. Though Wiratchant never held the lead until the 72 hole, he defeated Hsieh, his closest challenger, by one. Despite the loss, Hsieh was not particularly upset. "Thaworn was too good," he stated after the match. "When you birdie the last three holes, you deserve to win." In 2002, Hsieh recorded a runner-up finish at the Taiwan Open. This would be his final top-10 performance in a prominent event.

== Personal life ==
His brother, Hsieh Chin-sheng, is also a professional golfer. He played significantly on the Asia Golf Circuit.

== Professional wins (15) ==
=== Asia Golf Circuit wins (1) ===
No.	Date	Tournament	Winning score	Margin of victory	Runner-up
1	19 Mar 1988	Indonesia Open	−16 (69-62-67-66=264)	6 strokes	(Philippines) Mario Siodina

Asia Golf Circuit playoff record (0–2)

No.	Year	Tournament	Opponents	Result
1	1983	Indian Open	(Japan) Junichi Takahashi, (United States) Bob Tway	Takahashi won with birdie on second extra hole
2	1985	Taiwan Open	(Mexico) Rafael Alarcón, (Taiwan) Lu Liang-Huan	Lu won with par on sixth extra hole Hsieh eliminated by par on first hole

=== Taiwan wins (14) ===
- 1985 Lin Kou Open, Taichung Open
- 1986 King Grapes Classic, Taichung Open
- 1988 General Chow Chih-Jou Memorial Cup, Tainan Open, BMW Open, Chayi Open, Miller Beer Cup
- 1991 Chang Hwa Open
- 1992 Chang Kang Open
- 1993 Mercuries Taiwan Masters, Taichung Open
- 1994 Chang Hwa Open

== Results in major championships ==
Tournament	1983
The Open Championship	63

== Team appearances ==
- World Cup (representing Taiwan): 1987, 1992, 1993
- Dunhill Cup (representing Taiwan): 1990
