= 1992 World Cup (men's golf) =

Coordinates: 40°30′54″N 3°38′31″W

Tournament information
- Dates: 5–8 November
- Location: Madrid, Spain
- Courses: Real Club La Moraleja; Course 2
- Format: 72 holes stroke play combined score

Statistics
- Par: 72
- Length: 6,955 yards (6,360 m)
- Cut: None
- Prize fund: US$1.1 million
- Winner's share: $240,000 team $75,000 individual

Champion
- United States; Fred Couples & Davis Love III
- 548 (−28)

The 1992 World Cup took place 5–8 November 1992 at the Real Club La Moraleja in Madrid, Spain. It was the 38th World Cup event. The tournament was a 72-hole stroke play team event. Each team consisted of two players from a country. The combined score of each team determined the team results. The United States team of Fred Couples and Davis Love won by one stroke over the defending champions, Swedish team of Anders Forsbrand and Per-Ulrik Johansson. The individual competition was won by Brett Ogle of Australia after a playoff with Ian Woosnam of Wales.

== Teams ==
| Country | Players |
|---|---|
| Argentina | Rubén Alvarez and Antonio Ortiz |
| Australia | Brett Ogle and Peter O'Malley |
| Brazil | Joao Corteiz and Acacio Jorge Pedro |
| Canada | Brent Franklin and Richard Zokol |
| Chile | Guillermo Encina and Roy Mackenzie |
| Colombia | Ángel Romero and Rigoberto Velásquez |
| Denmark | Ole Eskildsen and Anders Sørensen |
| England | David Gilford and Steven Richardson |
| Finland | Anssi Kankkonen and Mikael Piltz |
| France | Jean van de Velde and Michel Besanceney |
| Germany | Bernhard Langer and Heinz-Peter Thül |
| Greece | Vassilios Karatzias and Craigen Pappas |
| Hong Kong | Dominique Boulet and Ming Yau Sui |
| Ireland | Christy O'Connor Jnr and Ronan Rafferty |
| Italy | Silvio Grappasonni and Costantino Rocca |
| Japan | Hirofumi Miyase and Kiyoshi Murota |
| Mexico | Enrique Serna and Esteban Toledo |
| Morocco | Fatmi Moussa and Mohamed Makroune |
| Netherlands | Constant Smits van Waesberghe and Chris van der Velde |
| New Zealand | Frank Nobilo and Greg Turner |
| Norway | Per Haugsrud and Gard Midtwåge |
| Paraguay | Carlos Franco and Raúl Fretes |
| Philippines | Frankie Miñoza and Robert Pactolerin |
| Scotland | Gordon Brand Jnr and Colin Montgomerie |
| South Africa | De Wet Basson and Ernie Els |
| South Korea | Choi Sang-ho and Park Nam-sin |
| Spain | Miguel Ángel Jiménez and José Rivero |
| Sweden | Anders Forsbrand and Per-Ulrik Johansson |
| Switzerland | André Bossert and Paolo Quirici |
| Taiwan | Hsieh Yu-shu and Wang Ter-chang |
| United States | Fred Couples and Davis Love III |
| Wales | Mark Mouland and Ian Woosnam |

== Scores ==
Team

| Place | Country | Score | To par | Money (US$) (per team) |
|---|---|---|---|---|
| 1 | United States | 134-139-140-135=548 | −28 | 240,000 |
| 2 | Sweden | 142-135-137-135=549 | −27 | 120,000 |
| T3 | Australia | 140-138-139-138=555 | −21 | 76,000 |
| T3 | Wales | 139-139-138-139=555 | −21 | 76,000 |
| 5 | Germany | 146-139-131-140=556 | −20 | 50,000 |
| 6 | Spain | 136-140-140-144=560 | −16 | 40,000 |
| 7 | New Zealand | 140-140-143-142=565 | −11 | 30,000 |
| 8 | South Africa | 140-143-146-137=566 | −10 | 24,000 |
| 9 | England | 143-141-143-142=569 | −7 | 18,000 |
| 10 | Japan | 139-142-148-142=571 | −5 | 16,000 |
| T11 | Canada | 140-142-143-147=572 | −4 | 13,000 |
| T11 | Chile | 140-145-139-148=572 | −4 | 13,000 |
| 13 | Paraguay | 142-144-147-140=573 | −3 | 10,000 |
| 14 | South Korea | 140-140-147-147=574 | −2 | 8,000 |
| 15 | Italy | 147-145-145-138=575 | −1 | 7,000 |
| 16 | Scotland | 143-143-150-140=576 | E | 7,000 |
| T17 | Ireland | 150-142-143-142=577 | +1 | 7,000 |
| T17 | Switzerland | 142-147-144-144=577 | +1 | 7,000 |
| T19 | France | 145-148-144-141=578 | +2 | 7,000 |
| T19 | Mexico | 144-152-141-141=578 | +2 | 7,000 |
| 21 | Denmark | 148-145-143-144=580 | +4 | 7,000 |
| 22 | Taiwan | 144-144-147-146=581 | +5 | 7,000 |
| 23 | Finland | 150-147-147-143=587 | +11 | 7,000 |
| T24 | Argentina | 145-140-145-159=589 | +13 | 7,000 |
| T24 | Brazil | 148-152-147-142=589 | +13 | 7,000 |
| 26 | Philippines | 151-148-144-147=590 | +14 | 7,000 |
| 27 | Norway | 147-151-144-149=591 | +15 | 7,000 |
| 28 | Colombia | 143-149-146-156=594 | +18 | 7,000 |
| T29 | Greece | 150-147-150-148=595 | +19 | 7,000 |
| T29 | Netherlands | 154-146-147-148=595 | +19 | 7,000 |
| 31 | Hong Kong | 152-154-145-146=597 | +21 | 7,000 |
| 32 | Morocco | 161-152-162-154=629 | +53 | 7,000 |

International Trophy

| Place | Player | Country | Score | To par | Money (US$) |
|---|---|---|---|---|---|
| 1 | Brett Ogle | Australia | 68-67-66-69=270 | −18 | 75,000 |
| 2 | Ian Woosnam | Wales | 67-69-67-67=270 | −18 | 50,000 |
| T3 | Fred Couples | United States | 66-71-70-65=272 | −16 | 35,000 |
| T3 | Anders Forsbrand | Sweden | 68-66-68-70=272 | −16 | 35,000 |
| 5 | Bernhard Langer | Germany | 71-66-66-70=273 | −15 | 20,000 |
| 6 | Frank Nobilo | New Zealand | 71-67-69-67=274 | −14 | 15,000 |
| 7 | Davis Love III | United States | 68-68-70-70=276 | −12 | |
| 8 | Per-Ulrik Johansson | Sweden | 74-69-68-65=277 | −11 | |
| T9 | Ernie Els | South Africa | 70-69-69-71=279 | −9 | |
| T9 | Miguel Ángel Jiménez | Spain | 70-70-69-70=279 | −9 | |

Ogle won at the first sudden death playoff hole.
