= 1987 Dunhill Cup =

Coordinates: 56.351484°N 2.816147°W

Tournament information
- Dates: 1–4 October
- Location: St Andrews, Scotland
- Course: Old Course at St Andrews
- Format: Match play

Statistics
- Par: 72
- Length: 6,933 yards (6,340 m)
- Field: 16 teams of 3 players
- Prize fund: US$1,000,000
- Winner's share: US$300,000

Champion
- England (Gordon J. Brand, Howard Clark, Nick Faldo)

The 1987 Dunhill Cup was the third Dunhill Cup. It was a team tournament featuring 16 countries, each represented by three players. The Cup was played 1–4 October at the Old Course at St Andrews in Scotland. The sponsor was the Alfred Dunhill company. The English team of Gordon J. Brand, Howard Clark, and Nick Faldo beat the Scottish team of Gordon Brand Jnr, Sandy Lyle, and Sam Torrance in the final.

== Format ==
The Cup was played as a single-elimination, match play event played over four days. The top eight teams were seeded with the remaining teams randomly placed in the bracket. In each match, the three players were paired with their opponents and played 18 holes at medal match play. Tied matches were extended to a sudden-death playoff only if they affected the outcome between the two teams.

== Bracket ==
First round
1	Australia	2
Sweden	1
8	Canada	2.5
New Zealand	0.5
5	Spain	3
Philippines	0
4	England	2.5
Mexico	0.5
2	United States	3
Italy	0
7	Japan	2
Malaysia	1
6	Ireland	3
France	0
3	Scotland	3
Zimbabwe	0

Quarter-finals
1	Australia	2
8	Canada	1
5	Spain	1
4	England	2
2	United States	2
7	Japan	1
6	Ireland	1
3	Scotland	2

Semi-finals
1	Australia	1
4	England	2
2	United States	0
3	Scotland	3

Final
4	England	2
3	Scotland	1
Third place
1	Australia	1
2	United States	2

== Round by round scores ==
=== First round ===
Canada – 2.5		New Zealand – 0.5	
Player	Score	Player	Score
Dave Barr	71	Bruce Soulsby	75
Dan Halldorson	74	Greg Turner	74
Richard Zokol	72	Frank Nobilo	74

Japan – 2		Malaysia – 1	
Player	Score	Player	Score
Koichi Suzuki	75	Marimuthu Ramayah	71
Nobuo Serizawa	70	Sahabuddin Yusof	76
Nobumitsu Yuhara	75	Zainal Abidin Yusof	80

United States – 3		Italy – 0	
Player	Score	Player	Score
Curtis Strange	71	Costantino Rocca	72
D. A. Weibring	69	Silvio Grappasonni	77
Mark O'Meara	70	Giuseppe Calì	75

Spain – 3		Philippines – 0	
Player	Score	Player	Score
José Rivero	68	Frankie Miñoza	75
José María Olazábal	71	Rudy Lavares	80
José María Cañizares	72	Eddie Bagtas	77

Ireland – 3		France – 0	
Player	Score	Player	Score
Ronan Rafferty	71	Michel Tapia	76
Eamonn Darcy	72	Géry Watine	76
Des Smyth	74	Emmanuel Dussart	76

Scotland – 3		Zimbabwe – 0	
Player	Score	Player	Score
Sandy Lyle	71	Tim Price	73
Gordon Brand Jnr	70	Anthony Edwards	72
Sam Torrance	72	William Koan	73

England – 2.5		Mexico – 0.5	
Player	Score	Player	Score
Howard Clark	71	Ernesto Perez Acosta	71
Nick Faldo	70	Carlos Espinoza	75
Gordon J. Brand	74	Feliciano Esparza	81

Australia – 2		Sweden – 1	
Player	Score	Player	Score
Rodger Davis	75	Ove Sellberg	69
Greg Norman	70	Mats Lanner	71
Peter Senior	67	Anders Forsbrand	70

=== Quarter-finals ===
United States – 2		Japan – 1	
Player	Score	Player	Score
Curtis Strange	68	Koichi Suzuki	70
D. A. Weibring	75	Nobumitsu Yuhara	69
Mark O'Meara	70	Nobuo Serizawa	70

O'Meara won on third playoff hole.

Scotland – 2		Ireland – 1	
Player	Score	Player	Score
Sam Torrance	69	Ronan Rafferty	74
Sandy Lyle	67	Eamonn Darcy	72
Gordon Brand Jnr	73	Des Smyth	67

Australia – 2		Canada – 1	
Player	Score	Player	Score
Rodger Davis	63	Dan Halldorson	73
Peter Senior	73	Dave Barr	73
Greg Norman	71	Richard Zokol	71

Barr won on first playoff hole.
Norman won on fifth playoff hole.

England – 2		Spain – 1	
Player	Score	Player	Score
Howard Clark	77	José Rivero	72
Nick Faldo	71	José María Olazábal	77
Gordon J. Brand	71	José María Cañizares	74

=== Semi-finals ===
United States – 0		Scotland – 3	
Player	Score	Player	Score
Curtis Strange	73	Sam Torrance	69
Mark O'Meara	71	Sandy Lyle	70
D. A. Weibring	74	Gordon Brand Jnr	73

Australia – 1		England – 2	
Player	Score	Player	Score
Peter Senior	74	Howard Clark	73
Greg Norman	68	Gordon J. Brand	69
Rodger Davis	72	Nick Faldo	71

=== Final ===
Scotland – 1		England – 2	
Player	Score	Player	Score
Sandy Lyle	69	Nick Faldo	66
Sam Torrance	69	Gordon J. Brand	64
Gordon Brand Jnr	68	Howard Clark	73

=== Third place ===
Australia – 1		United States – 2	
Player	Score	Player	Score
Peter Senior	72	Mark O'Meara	71
Rodger Davis	70	D. A. Weibring	71
Greg Norman	70	Curtis Strange	62

== Team results ==
Country	Place	W	L	Seed
England	1	8.5	3.5	4
Scotland	2	9	3	3
United States	3	7	5	2
Australia	4	6	6	1
Ireland	T5	4	2	6
Spain	T5	4	2	5
Canada	T5	3.5	2.5	8
Japan	T5	3	3	7
Malaysia	T9	1	2	
Sweden	T9	1	2	
Mexico	T9	0.5	2.5	
New Zealand	T9	0.5	2.5	
France	T9	0	3	
Italy	T9	0	3	
Philippines	T9	0	3	
Zimbabwe	T9	0	3	

== Player results ==
Country	Player	W	L
England	Nick Faldo	4	0
England	Gordon J. Brand	3	1
England	Howard Clark	1.5	2.5
Scotland	Gordon Brand Jnr	3	1
Scotland	Sandy Lyle	3	1
Scotland	Sam Torrance	3	1
United States	Mark O'Meara	3	1
United States	Curtis Strange	3	1
United States	D. A. Weibring	1	3
Australia	Greg Norman	3	1
Australia	Rodger Davis	2	2
Australia	Peter Senior	1	3
Spain	José Rivero	2	0
Spain	José María Cañizares	1	1
Spain	José María Olazábal	1	1
Ireland	Des Smyth	2	0
Ireland	Eamonn Darcy	1	1
Ireland	Ronan Rafferty	1	1
Canada	Dave Barr	2	0
Canada	Richard Zokol	1	1
Canada	Dan Halldorson	0.5	1.5
Japan	Nobumitsu Yuhara	2	0
Japan	Nobuo Serizawa	1	1
Japan	Koichi Suzuki	0	2
Malaysia	Marimuthu Ramayah	1	0
Malaysia	Sahabuddin Yusof	0	1
Malaysia	Zainal Abidin Yusof	0	1
Sweden	Ove Sellberg	1	0
Sweden	Anders Forsbrand	0	1
Sweden	Mats Lanner	0	1
Mexico	Ernesto Perez Acosta	0.5	0.5
Mexico	Feliciano Esparza	0	1
Mexico	Carlos Espinoza	0	1
New Zealand	Greg Turner	0.5	0.5
New Zealand	Frank Nobilo	0	1
New Zealand	Bruce Soulsby	0	1
France	Emmanuel Dussart	0	1
France	Michel Tapia	0	1
France	Géry Watine	0	1
Italy	Giuseppe Calì	0	1
Italy	Silvio Grappasonni	0	1
Italy	Costantino Rocca	0	1
Philippines	Eddie Bagtas	0	1
Philippines	Rudy Lavares	0	1
Philippines	Frankie Miñoza	0	1
Zimbabwe	Anthony Edwards	0	1
Zimbabwe	William Koan	0	1
Zimbabwe	Tim Price	0	1
