= Gabriel Hjertstedt =

Swedish professional golfer

Personal information
- Full name: Gabriel Hjertstedt
- Nationality: Sweden
- Born: 5 December 1971 (age 54) Umeå, Sweden
- Height: 1.77 m (5 ft 10 in)
- Weight: 62 kg (137 lb; 9.8 st)

Career
- Sport: Golf
- Turned professional: 1990
- Former tours: PGA Tour; European Tour; Japan Golf Tour; PGA Tour of Australasia
- Professional wins: 2

Number of wins by tour
- PGA Tour: 2

Best results in major championships
- Masters Tournament: CUT: 1998, 1999, 2000
- PGA Championship: T16: 1999
- U.S. Open: T30: 2001
- The Open Championship: CUT: 1994, 1999

Achievements and awards
- PGA Tour of Australia Rookie of the Year: 1990

Gabriel Hjertstedt (born 5 December 1971) is a Swedish professional golfer. In 1997, he became the first Swede to win on the U.S.-based PGA Tour.

== Early life and amateur career ==
Hjertstedt was born in Umeå, Sweden. His family relocated to Australia when he was eleven and he learned to play golf there. He joined the Swedish National Team and won bronze at the 1989 European Boys' Team Championship with Max Anglert, Pierre Fulke, Klas Eriksson and Rikard Strångert, shooting 69-69 in the stroke play, five strokes ahead of Massimo Florioli in second.

Hjertstedt was part of the Swedish team winning the 1990 Eisenhower Trophy in Christchurch, New Zealand with Klas Eriksson, Mathias Grönberg and Per Nyman, registering the tournament's second lowest individual score behind Grönberg. His team finished a total of 13 strokes ahead of the United States team that included David Duval and Phil Mickelson in second place.

== Professional career ==
In 1990, Hjertstedt turned professional. That year he joined the PGA Tour of Australasia where he tied for 7th at the New Zealand Open and for 4th at the Australian Masters at Huntingdale Golf Club. He also earned Rookie of the Year honors.

In 1992, he played on the Japan Golf Tour, where he tied for 16th at the Pepsi Ube Kosan Open and 17th at the Acom International.

He played on the European Tour from 1993 to 1996. In his rookie season, in 1993, Hjertstedt was runner-up at the Open de Lyon behind Costantino Rocca. In 1994, he was again runner-up at the Open de Lyon and also at Peugeot Open de France at Le Golf National, a stroke behind Mark Roe.

Hjertstedt tied for 9th at PGA Tour Q-School to join the U.S.-based PGA Tour in 1997. In his rookie year, he won the B.C. Open in New York the same week that Europe won that year's Ryder Cup at Valderrama Golf Club, to become the first Swede to win on the PGA Tour. He followed up in 1999 by claiming his second PGA Tour title at the Touchstone Energy Tucson Open after he birdied the first hole in a playoff with Tommy Armour III.

He represented Sweden in the Dunhill Cup in 1994 and again in 1999, where he tied for 3rd together with Jarmo Sandelin and Patrik Sjöland, after he lost to Australia's Craig Parry on the first playoff hole in the semi-final. He did not play any PGA Tour-sanctioned events after 2009, until he appeared on the PGA Tour Champions in 2022. He has served as golf coach based at Scottsdale National Golf Club with clients such as Kevin Chappell and Graham DeLaet.

== Awards and honors ==
In 1990, Hjertstedt earned Rookie of the Year honors for the PGA Tour of Australasia.

== Amateur wins ==
- 1989 Doug Sanders World Junior Championship, European Boys' Team Championship (individual stroke play medalist)

== Professional wins (2) ==
=== PGA Tour wins (2) ===
No.	Date	Tournament	Winning score	Margin of victory	Runner(s)-up
1	28 Sep 1997	B.C. Open	−13 (70-69-66-70=275)	1 stroke	(United States) Andrew Magee, (United States) Chris Perry, (United States) Lee Rinker
2	28 Feb 1999	Touchstone Energy Tucson Open	−16 (67-68-73-68=276)	Playoff	(United States) Tommy Armour III

PGA Tour playoff record (1–0)

No.	Year	Tournament	Opponent	Result
1	1999	Touchstone Energy Tucson Open	(United States) Tommy Armour III	Won with birdie on first extra hole

== Results in major championships ==
Tournament	1994	1995	1996	1997	1998	1999	2000	2001	2002	2003	2004
Masters Tournament					CUT	CUT	CUT				
U.S. Open						T34		T30			CUT
The Open Championship	CUT					CUT					
PGA Championship					CUT	T16					

Did not play

CUT = missed the half-way cut
"T" = tied

== Team appearances ==
Amateur

- European Boys' Team Championship (representing Sweden): 1989
- Jacques Léglise Trophy (representing the Continent of Europe): 1989
- St Andrews Trophy (representing the Continent of Europe): 1990
- Eisenhower Trophy (representing Sweden): 1990 (winners)

Professional

- Dunhill Cup (representing Sweden): 1994, 1999

== See also ==
- 1996 PGA Tour Qualifying School graduates
