= Torsten Giedeon =

German professional golfer

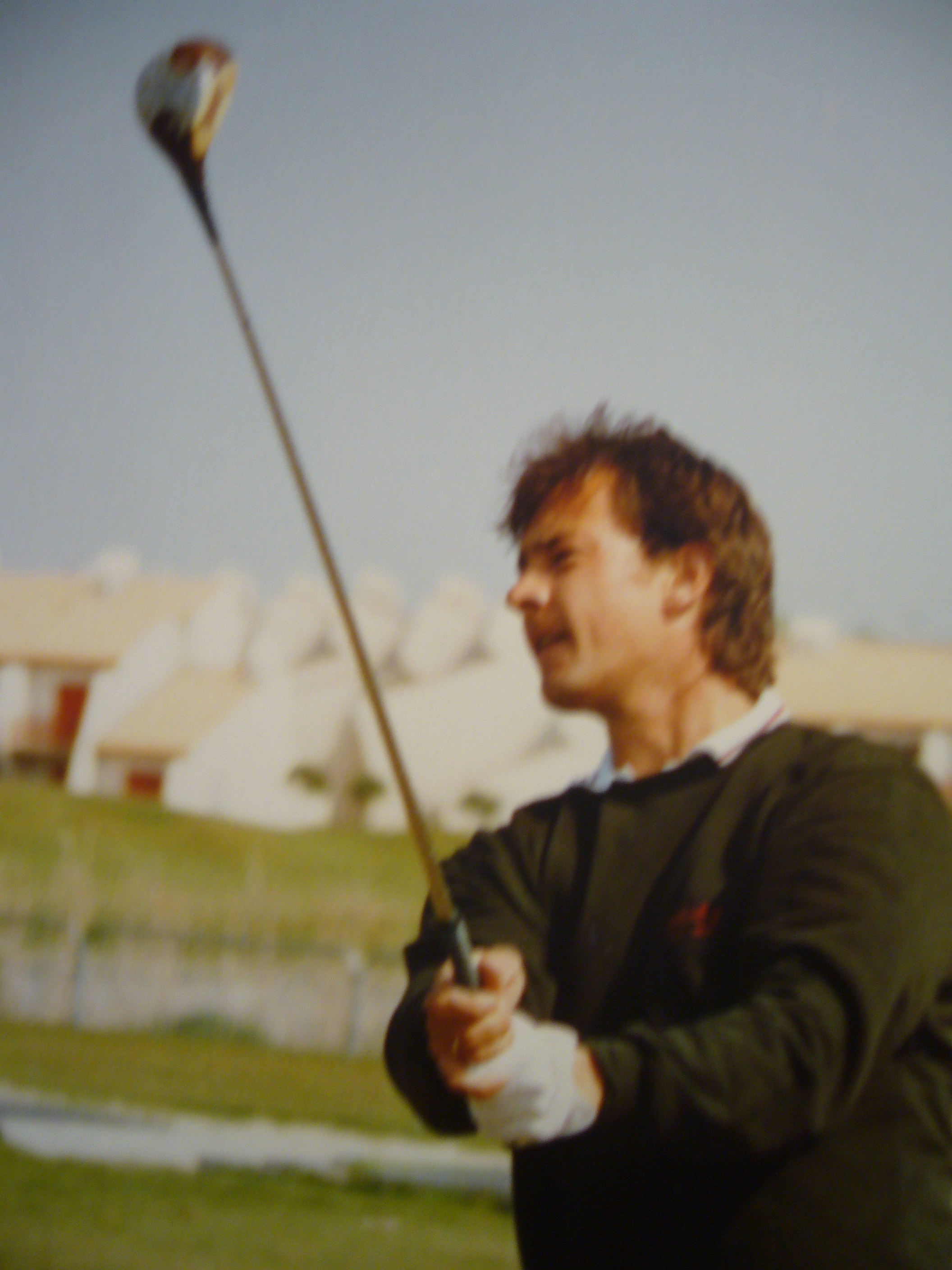

Personal information
- Nationality: Germany
- Born: 14 August 1957 (age 69) Hamburg, West Germany

Career
- Sport: Golf
- Turned professional: 1975
- Former tours: European Tour; European Senior Tour
- Professional wins: 3

Best results in major championships
- Masters Tournament: DNP
- PGA Championship: DNP
- U.S. Open: DNP
- The Open Championship: CUT: 1983

Torsten Giedeon (born 14 August 1957) is a German professional golfer who played on the European Tour and won the 1990 World Cup.

== Professional career ==
Giedeon joined the European Tour and played over 100 tournaments 1979–1996, where his best finish was a tie for third in the 1992 Belgian Open along with Seve Ballesteros, 4 strokes behind winner Miguel Ángel Jiménez. He won the 1994 American Express Trophy in Frankfurt, a Challenge Tour event. His only appearance in a men's major golf championship was at the 112th Open Championship, held 1983 at Royal Birkdale Golf Club. After a first round of 73 he carded an 80 in the second round (just like defending champion Tom Watson did in the 1976 Open on the same course) and finished last.

Giedeon represented Germany in the 1992 Dunhill Cup and in eight World Cup events 1982–1991. The 1990 World Cup in Orlando, Florida was arguably the highlight of his career as he teamed up with Bernhard Langer and won, after they both shot 278 (–10) to finish tied 5th individually.

Giedeon left golf club management for teaching in order to free up more time to play on the European Senior Tour. He played 45 tournaments 2007–2013, including the 2008 and 2009 Senior Open Championship.

== Professional wins (3) ==
=== EPD Tour wins (1) ===
| No. | Date | Tournament | Winning score | Margin of victory | Runners-up |
|---|---|---|---|---|---|
| 1 | 16 May 2000 | Jakobsberg Classic | −3 (69-72=141) | 1 stroke | (Germany) Felix Lubenau, (Austria) Michael Mitteregger |

=== Other wins (2) ===
| No. | Date | Tournament | Winning score | Margin of victory | Runner(s)-up |
|---|---|---|---|---|---|
| 1 | 24 Nov 1990 | World Cup (with (Germany) Bernhard Langer) | −20 (141-142-132-141=556) | 3 strokes | England − Richard Boxall and Mark James, Ireland − David Feherty and Ronan Rafferty |
| 2 | 15 May 1994 | American Express Trophy | | | (Germany) Rainer Mund |

== Results in major championships ==
| Tournament | 1983 |
|---|---|
| The Open Championship | CUT |

CUT = missed the halfway cut
Note: Giedeon only played in The Open Championship.

== Team appearances ==
Professional

- World Cup (representing Germany): 1982, 1983, 1984, 1985, 1987, 1989, 1990 (winners), 1991
- Alfred Dunhill Cup (representing Germany): 1992
