= Marc Farry =

French professional golfer

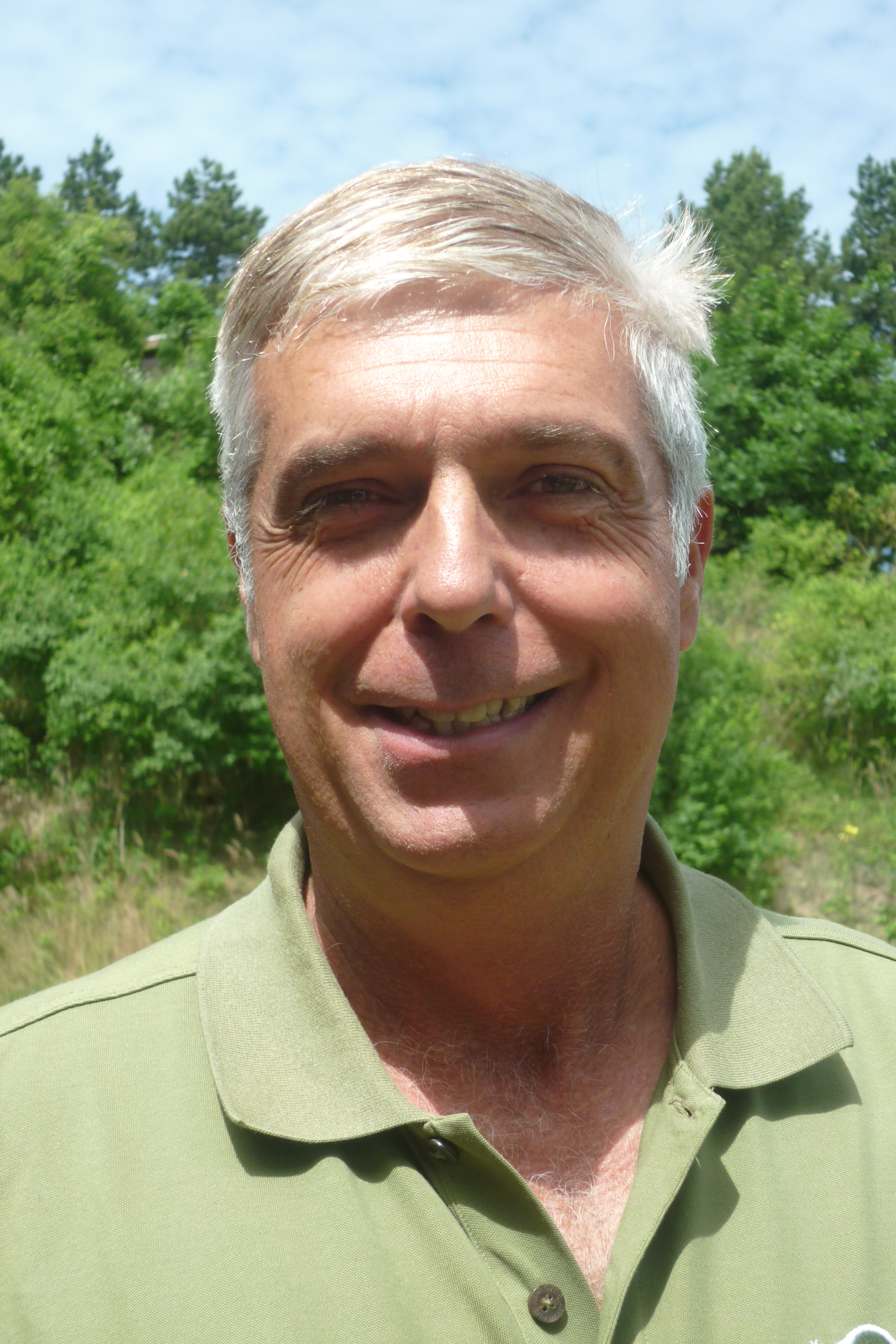
- Farry at the 2010 Van Lanschot Senior Open

Personal information
- Full name: Marc-Antoine Farry
- Nationality: France
- Born: 3 July 1959 (age 67) Paris, France
- Height: 1.88 m (6 ft 2 in)
- Weight: 87 kg (192 lb; 13.7 st)
- Spouse: Isabelle (m. 1986)
- Children: 3

Career
- Sport: Golf
- Turned professional: 1979
- Current tour: European Senior Tour
- Former tour: European Tour
- Professional wins: 19

Number of wins by tour
- European Tour: 1
- European Senior Tour: 2
- Other: 16

Best results in major championships
- Masters Tournament: DNP
- PGA Championship: DNP
- U.S. Open: DNP
- The Open Championship: CUT: 1979, 1991, 1996, 1999, 2000, 2002

Marc-Antoine Farry (born 3 July 1959) is a French professional golfer.

== Career ==
Farry was born in Paris, and started playing golf at the age of seven. He turned professional in 1979, and spent his early career as a teaching professional in Florida, United States.

Farry was a full member of the European Tour from 1989 to 2004. He has won 16 tournaments on the French domestic tour, including the 1985 and 2000 French PGA Championships, but has only one win to his name on the European Tour, the 1996 BMW International Open, which was reduced to 36 holes because of rain. His best finish on the European Tour Order of Merit was 49th in 1999.

At the 2003 Open de France, the French Sports Ministry decided to conduct voluntary drug tests on some of the competitors. The top three at the end of the tournament, and another three players selected at random were tested. Farry was one of the names pulled out of the hat, along with Graeme McDowell and François Delamontagne, with Philip Golding, David Howell and Peter O'Malley also being tested as the leading finishers. While the other five provided negative tests, Farry's came back positive for prednisolone, an anti-inflammatory. It was the first positive drug test recorded on the European Tour, and reported as possibly the first by any professional golfer.

Since Farry had been prescribed the drug by his doctor as treatment for a wrist injury, and the golfing authorities had yet to formulate an anti-drugs policy, his result in the tournament was allowed to stand and no further action was taken.

== Professional wins (19) ==
=== European Tour wins (1) ===
No.	Date	Tournament	Winning score	Margin of victory	Runner-up
1	23 Jun 1996	BMW International Open	−12 (65-67=132) (Note: Shortened to 36 holes due to weather.)	1 stroke	(Australia) Richard Green

=== Other wins (16) ===
16 wins on French domestic tour including:

- 1985 French PGA Championship
- 2000 French PGA Championship

=== European Senior Tour wins (2) ===
No.	Date	Tournament	Winning score	Margin of victory	Runner-up
1	13 Jun 2010	Handa Irish Senior Open	−10 (67-70-69=206)	2 strokes	(Scotland) Ross Drummond
2	11 Oct 2010	Cannes Mougins Masters	−9 (69-65-73=207)	2 strokes	(Scotland) Gordon Brand Jnr

European Senior Tour playoff record (0–1)

No.	Year	Tournament	Opponent	Result
1	2019	Senior Italian Open	(England) Barry Lane	Lost to birdie on second extra hole

== Results in major championships ==
Tournament	1979	1980	1981	1982	1983	1984	1985	1986	1987	1988	1989
The Open Championship	CUT										

Tournament	1990	1991	1992	1993	1994	1995	1996	1997	1998	1999	2000	2001	2002
The Open Championship		CUT					CUT			CUT	CUT		CUT

Note: Farry only played in The Open Championship.

Did not play

CUT = missed the half-way cut

== Team appearances ==
Amateur

- European Amateur Team Championship (representing France): 1977
- European Youths' Team Championship (representing France): 1978, 1979 (winners)

Professional

- World Cup (representing France): 1987, 1991, 1993, 1996, 1997, 1999
- Alfred Dunhill Cup (representing France): 1990, 1992, 1997, 1999
- Europcar Cup (representing France): 1985 (winners)
