= 1993 World Cup of Golf =

Coordinates: 28.414753°N 81.262172°W

Tournament information
- Dates: November 11–14
- Location: Orlando, Florida, U.S.
- Course: Lake Nona Golf & Country Club
- Format: 72 holes stroke play combined score

Statistics
- Par: 72
- Length: 7,011 yards (6,411 m)
- Field: 32 two-man teams
- Cut: None
- Prize fund: US$1.2 million
- Winner's share: $260,000 team $100,000 individual

Champion
- United States; Fred Couples & Davis Love III
- 556 (−20)
- Location in the United States Location in Florida

The 1993 World Cup of Golf took place November 11–14 at the Lake Nona Golf & Country Club in Orlando, Florida, United States. It was the 39th World Cup. The tournament was a 72-hole stroke play team event with each team consisting of two players from a country. The combined score of each team determined the team results. Individuals also competed for the International Trophy. The winners share of the prize money was $300,000 going to the winning pair and $100,000 to the top individual. The United States team of Fred Couples and Davis Love III won (for the second time in a row with the same players in the team) by five strokes over the Zimbabwe team of Mark McNulty and Nick Price. Bernhard Langer of Germany took the International Trophy by three strokes over Couples.

== Teams ==
Country	Players
Argentina	Luis Carbonetti and Eduardo Romero
Australia	Robert Allenby and Rodger Davis
Bermuda	Kim Swan and Dwayne Pearman
Brazil	Antonio Barcellos and Joao Corteiz
Canada	Dave Barr and Richard Zokol
Chile	Guillermo Encina and Roy Mackenzie
Denmark	Anders Sørensen and Steen Tinning
England	David Gilford and Mark James
Fiji	Vilikesa Kalou and Dharam Prakash
France	Marc Farry and Jean van de Velde
Germany	Bernhard Langer and Sven Strüver
Greece	Vassilios Karatzias and George Nikitaidis
Hong Kong	Richard Kan and Ming Yau Sui
Ireland	Paul McGinley and Ronan Rafferty
Israel	Rami Assyag and Jacob Avnaim
Italy	Silvio Grappasonni and Costantino Rocca
Jamaica	Christian Bernhard and Seymour Rose
Japan	Hideto Shigenobu and Katsuyoshi Tomori
Mexico	Rodolfo Cazaubón and Efren Serna
Netherlands	Constant Smits van Waesberghe and Chris van der Velde
New Zealand	Frank Nobilo and Greg Turner
Paraguay	Felix Franco and Pedro Martínez
Puerto Rico	Rafael Castrillo and Chi-Chi Rodríguez
Scotland	Colin Montgomerie and Sam Torrance
South Africa	Ernie Els and Retief Goosen
South Korea	Park Nam-sin and Lee Kang-sun
Spain	Miguel Ángel Jiménez and José Rivero
Sweden	Anders Forsbrand and Joakim Haeggman
Taiwan	Chen Liang-hsi and Hsieh Yu-shu
United States	Fred Couples and Davis Love III
Wales	Mark Mouland and Ian Woosnam
Zimbabwe	Nick Price and Mark McNulty

== Scores ==
Team

Place	Country	Score	To par	Money (US$) (per team)
1	United States	137-140-141-138=556	−20	260,000
2	Zimbabwe	141-137-143-140=561	−15	150,000
3	Scotland	143-139-140-143=565	−11	100,000
4	Australia	142-138-142-144=566	−10	75,000
5	Spain	145-142-138-142=567	−9	60,000
T6	New Zealand	147-142-133-146=568	−8	37,500
T6	South Africa	140-145-141-142=568	−8	37,500
8	Germany	143-143-140-145=571	−5	25,000
T9	Ireland	143-140-146-144=573	−3	18,500
T9	Italy	145-147-136-145=573	−3	18,500
T11	Canada	150-141-140-143=574	−2	14,000
T11	England	145-147-140-142=574	−2	14,000
T13	France	140-148-143-144=575	−1	10,500
T13	Sweden	143-146-146-140=575	−1	10,500
15	Paraguay	147-146-138-148=579	+3	9,000
16	Wales	142-149-149-142=582	+6	8,000
17	Brazil	151-140-145-147=583	+7	7,000
18	Japan	144-150-148-146=588	+12	7,000
19	Argentina	144-150-149-149=592	+16	7,000
T20	Hong Kong	147-146-151-153=597	+21	7,000
T20	Mexico	146-154-147-150=597	+21	7,000
22	Netherlands	152-147-152-150=602	+26	7,000
23	Greece	151-150-152-150=603	+27	7,000
24	Taiwan	156-150-155-148=609	+33	7,000
25	Bermuda	154-155-148-160=617	+41	7,000
26	Puerto Rico	163-154-153-159=629	+53	7,000
27	Fiji	169-158-156-163=646	+70	7,000
28	Jamaica	174-154-161-163=652	+76	7,000
29	Israel	174-167-170-171=682	+106	7,000
WD	Chile	150-WD		7,000
DQ	South Korea	147-DQ		7,000
WD	Denmark	WD		7,000

Roy Mackenzie of Chile withdrew with a neck injury and Park Nam-sin of South Korea was disqualified for signing an incorrect scorecard.

International Trophy

Place	Player	Country	Score	To par	Money (US$)
1	Bernhard Langer	Germany	69-68-66-69=272	−16	100,000
2	Fred Couples	United States	66-71-70-68=275	−13	50,000
T3	Ernie Els	South Africa	69-71-72-66=278	−10	35,000
T3	Nick Price	Zimbabwe	70-69-71-68=278	−10	35,000
5	Jean van de Velde	France	66-70-71-72=279	−9	20,000
6	Robert Allenby	Australia	72-68-70-70=280	−8	15,000
T7	Davis Love III	United States	71-69-71-70=281	−7	
T7	Sam Torrance	Scotland	68-69-71-73=281	−7	
T9	Anders Forsbrand	Sweden	71-69-74-68=282	−6	
T9	Miguel Ángel Jiménez	Spain	72-70-72-68=282	−6	
