= Samson Gimson =

Singaporean professional golfer (born 1964)

Personal information
- Nationality: Singapore
- Born: 22 January 1964 (age 62)
- Height: 1.87 m (6 ft 2 in)
- Weight: 98 kg (216 lb; 15.4 st)

Career
- Sport: Golf
- Status: Professional
- Former tour: Japan Golf Tour (1993-97)
- Professional wins: 9

Number of wins by tour
- Japan Golf Tour: 1
- Other: 8

Samson Gimson (born 22 January 1964) is a Singaporean professional golfer.

== Career ==
In 1989, Gimson won the gold medal at the Southeast Asian Games.

Gimson played on the Japan Golf Tour from 1993 to 1997, winning once.

== Amateur wins ==
- 1986 Hong Kong Amateur
- 1987 Hong Kong Amateur, Sentosa Invitational, Desaru Amateur
- 1989 Singapore Open Amateur Championship, Pahang Open Amateur, Perak Amateur Open, Selangor Amateur Open, Southeast Asian Games (gold medal)

== Professional wins (9) ==
=== PGA of Japan Tour wins (1) ===
No.	Date	Tournament	Winning score	Margin of victory	Runner-up
1	25 Jul 1993	Nikkei Cup	−12 (72-73-64-67=276)	2 strokes	(Japan) Hisayuki Sasaki

=== Other wins (8) ===
- 1990 Singapore PGA Championship
- 1991 Langkawi TDC Tour, Sarawak TDC Tour, Johor TDC Tour, Labuan TDC Tour, Tiger Beer Open
- 1998 Anderson Consulting Champions of Champions, Emirates PGA Singapore Championship

== Team appearances ==
Amateur

- Eisenhower Trophy (representing Singapore): 1988

Professional

- World Cup (representing Singapore): 1990
