= 1994 Dunhill Cup =

Coordinates: 56.351484°N 2.816147°W

Tournament information
- Dates: 6–9 October 1994
- Location: St Andrews, Scotland
- Course: Old Course at St Andrews
- Format: Match play

Statistics
- Par: 72
- Length: 6,933 yards (6,340 m)
- Field: 16 teams of 3 players
- Prize fund: US$1,500,000
- Winner's share: US$450,000

Champion
- Canada (Dave Barr, Rick Gibson, Ray Stewart)

The 1994 Dunhill Cup was the 10th Dunhill Cup. It was a team tournament featuring 16 countries, each represented by three players. The Cup was played 6–9 October 1994 at the Old Course at St Andrews in Scotland. The sponsor was the Alfred Dunhill company. The Canadian team of Dave Barr, Rick Gibson, Ray Stewart beat the American team of Fred Couples, Tom Kite, and Curtis Strange in the final. They were the first unseeded team to win the Dunhill Cup.

== Format ==
The Cup was a match play event played over four days. The teams were divided into four four-team groups. The top eight teams were seeded with the remaining teams randomly placed in the groups. After three rounds of round-robin play, the top team in each group advanced to a single elimination playoff.

In each team match, the three players were paired with their opponents and played 18 holes at medal match play. Matches tied at the end of 18 holes were extended to a sudden-death playoff. The tie-breaker for ties within a group was based on match record, then head-to-head.

== Group play ==
=== Round one ===
Group 1

United States – 2		Japan – 1	
Player	Score	Player	Score
Tom Kite	75	Nobuo Serizawa	74
Curtis Strange	78	Tomohiro Maruyama	80
Fred Couples	75	Yoshi Mizumaki	80

New Zealand – 2		Ireland – 1	
Player	Score	Player	Score
Frank Nobilo	74	Darren Clarke	72
Greg Turner	72	Paul McGinley	77
Grant Waite	80	Philip Walton	81

Group 2

England – 3		Spain – 0	
Player	Score	Player	Score
Barry Lane	76	José Rivero	77
Howard Clark	80	Miguel Ángel Martín	82
Mark Roe	75	Miguel Ángel Jiménez	80

Australia – 2		France – 1	
Player	Score	Player	Score
Steve Elkington	75	Jean van de Velde	76
Robert Allenby	78	Jean-Louis Guépy	77
Greg Norman	72	Michel Besanceney	76

Group 3

South Africa – 2		Taiwan – 1	
Player	Score	Player	Score
Wayne Westner	84	Chen Tze-chung	83
Ernie Els	81	Yeh Chang-ting	83
David Frost	76	Chen Tze-ming	77

Scotland – 2		Paraguay – 1	
Player	Score	Player	Score
Gordon Brand Jnr	79	Ángel Franco	74
Andrew Coltart	78	Raúl Fretes	78
Colin Montgomerie	78	Carlos Franco	79

Coltart won on the first playoff hole.

Group 4

Sweden – 2		Canada – 1	
Player	Score	Player	Score
Gabriel Hjertstedt	76	Dave Barr	76
Jesper Parnevik	77	Ray Stewart	76
Anders Forsbrand	81	Rick Gibson	85

Hjertstedt won on the second playoff hole.

Zimbabwe – 2		Germany – 1	
Player	Score	Player	Score
Nick Price	76	Bernhard Langer	78
Tony Johnstone	81	Alex Čejka	76
Mark McNulty	76	Sven Strüver	82

=== Round two ===
Group 1

Japan – 2		New Zealand – 1	
Player	Score	Player	Score
Nobuo Serizawa	71	Greg Turner	74
Tomohiro Maruyama	77	Grant Waite	72
Yoshi Mizumaki	71	Frank Nobilo	73

United States – 1		Ireland – 2	
Player	Score	Player	Score
Curtis Strange	74	Paul McGinley	76
Tom Kite	76	Philip Walton	72
Fred Couples	74	Darren Clarke	71

Group 2

Australia – 2		Spain – 1	
Player	Score	Player	Score
Steve Elkington	67	Miguel Ángel Martín	70
Robert Allenby	69	José Rivero	67
Greg Norman	70	Miguel Ángel Jiménez	72

England – 3		France – 0	
Player	Score	Player	Score
Howard Clark	73	Michel Besanceney	73
Barry Lane	70	Jean-Louis Guépy	73
Mark Roe	73	Jean van de Velde	76

Clark won on the second playoff hole.

Group 3

Scotland – 3		Taiwan – 0	
Player	Score	Player	Score
Gordon Brand Jnr	70	Chen Tze-chung	75
Andrew Coltart	70	Yeh Chang-ting	74
Colin Montgomerie	70	Chen Tze-ming	75

South Africa – 2		Paraguay – 1	
Player	Score	Player	Score
Wayne Westner	69	Raúl Fretes	73
David Frost	70	Carlos Franco	72
Ernie Els	72	Ángel Franco	72

Franco won on the sixth playoff hole.

Group 4

Sweden – 1		Germany – 2	
Player	Score	Player	Score
Gabriel Hjertstedt	72	Bernhard Langer	69
Anders Forsbrand	73	Alex Čejka	73
Jesper Parnevik	70	Sven Strüver	76

Čejka won on the second playoff hole.

Zimbabwe – 1		Canada – 2	
Player	Score	Player	Score
Tony Johnstone	72	Rick Gibson	71
Mark McNulty	71	Ray Stewart	76
Nick Price	69	Dave Barr	68

=== Round three ===
Group 1

United States – 3		New Zealand – 0	
Player	Score	Player	Score
Tom Kite	69	Grant Waite	71
Curtis Strange	69	Frank Nobilo	70
Fred Couples	72	Greg Turner	74

Ireland – 2		Japan – 1	
Player	Score	Player	Score
Philip Walton	70	Yoshi Mizumaki	64
Paul McGinley	70	Tomohiro Maruyama	72
Darren Clarke	70	Nobuo Serizawa	76

Group 2

France – 2		Spain – 1	
Player	Score	Player	Score
Jean-Louis Guépy	77	Miguel Ángel Jiménez	73
Jean van de Velde	67	José Rivero	70
Michel Besanceney	69	Miguel Ángel Martín	73

Australia – 0		England – 3	
Player	Score	Player	Score
Robert Allenby	71	Barry Lane	69
Steve Elkington	68	Howard Clark	65
Greg Norman	72	Mark Roe	69

Group 3

Taiwan – 2		Paraguay – 1	
Player	Score	Player	Score
Chen Tze-chung	74	Raúl Fretes	72
Yeh Chang-ting	75	Ángel Franco	76
Chen Tze-ming	72	Carlos Franco	73

South Africa – 2		Scotland – 1	
Player	Score	Player	Score
Wayne Westner	72	Andrew Coltart	70
Ernie Els	68	Gordon Brand Jnr	70
David Frost	71	Colin Montgomerie	74

Group 4

Canada – 2		Germany – 1	
Player	Score	Player	Score
Ray Stewart	72	Sven Strüver	72
Rick Gibson	69	Alex Čejka	73
Dave Barr	69	Bernhard Langer	70

Strüver won on the first playoff hole.

Zimbabwe – 2		Sweden – 1	
Player	Score	Player	Score
Tony Johnstone	70	Gabriel Hjertstedt	73
Nick Price	70	Anders Forsbrand	73
Mark McNulty	70	Jesper Parnevik	67

=== Standings ===
Group 1
Country	W	L	MW	ML
United States	2	1	6	3
Ireland	2	1	5	4
Japan	1	2	4	5
New Zealand	1	2	3	6

Group 2
Country	W	L	MW	ML
England	3	0	9	0
Australia	2	1	4	5
France	1	2	3	6
Spain	0	3	2	7

Group 3
Country	W	L	MW	ML
South Africa	3	0	6	3
Scotland	2	1	6	3
Taiwan	1	2	3	6
Paraguay	0	3	3	6

Group 4
Country	W	L	MW	ML
Canada	2	1	5	4
Zimbabwe	2	1	5	4
Germany	1	2	4	5
Sweden	1	2	4	5

== Playoffs ==
=== Bracket ===
Semi-finals
1	United States	3
5	England	0
3	South Africa	1
Canada	2

Final
1	United States	1
Canada	2

=== Semi-finals ===
United States – 3		England – 0	
Player	Score	Player	Score
Tom Kite	69	Mark Roe	70
Fred Couples	68	Howard Clark	74
Curtis Strange	70	Barry Lane	71

South Africa – 1		Canada – 2	
Player	Score	Player	Score
David Frost	75	Ray Stewart	70
Wayne Westner	74	Rick Gibson	70
Ernie Els	68	Dave Barr	72

=== Final ===
United States – 1		Canada – 2	
Player	Score	Player	Score
Tom Kite	71	Dave Barr	70
Curtis Strange	67	Rick Gibson	74
Fred Couples	72	Ray Stewart	71

== Team results ==
Country	Place	W	L	MW	ML	Seed
Canada	1	4	1	9	6	
United States	2	3	2	10	5	1
England	T3	3	1	9	3	5
South Africa	T3	3	1	7	5	3
Scotland	T5	2	1	6	3	6
Ireland	T5	2	1	5	4	
Zimbabwe	T5	2	1	5	4	2
Australia	T5	2	1	4	5	4
Japan	T9	1	2	4	5	
Germany	T9	1	2	4	5	
Sweden	T9	1	2	4	5	7
New Zealand	T9	1	2	3	6	8
France	T9	1	2	3	6	
Taiwan	T9	1	2	3	6	
Paraguay	T15	0	3	3	6	
Spain	T15	0	3	2	7	

== Player results ==
Country	Player	W	L
Canada	Dave Barr	3	2
Canada	Rick Gibson	3	2
Canada	Ray Stewart	3	2
United States	Curtis Strange	5	0
United States	Fred Couples	3	2
United States	Tom Kite	2	3
England	Howard Clark	3	1
England	Barry Lane	3	1
England	Mark Roe	3	1
South Africa	Ernie Els	3	1
South Africa	David Frost	3	1
South Africa	Wayne Westner	1	3
Scotland	Andrew Coltart	3	0
Scotland	Colin Montgomerie	2	1
Scotland	Gordon Brand Jnr	1	2
Ireland	Darren Clarke	3	0
Ireland	Paul McGinley	1	2
Ireland	Philip Walton	1	2
Zimbabwe	Mark McNulty	2	1
Zimbabwe	Nick Price	2	1
Zimbabwe	Tony Johnstone	1	2
Australia	Steve Elkington	2	1
Australia	Greg Norman	2	1
Australia	Robert Allenby	0	3
Japan	Yoshi Mizumaki	2	1
Japan	Nobuo Serizawa	2	1
Japan	Tomohiro Maruyama	0	3
Germany	Alex Čejka	2	1
Germany	Bernhard Langer	1	2
Germany	Sven Strüver	1	2
Sweden	Jesper Parnevik	2	1
Sweden	Anders Forsbrand	1	2
Sweden	Gabriel Hjertstedt	1	2
New Zealand	Grant Waite	2	1
New Zealand	Greg Turner	1	2
New Zealand	Frank Nobilo	0	3
France	Michel Besanceney	1	2
France	Jean-Louis Guépy	1	2
France	Jean van de Velde	1	2
Taiwan	Chen Tze-chung	1	2
Taiwan	Chen Tze-ming	1	2
Taiwan	Yeh Chang-ting	1	2
Paraguay	Ángel Franco	2	1
Paraguay	Raúl Fretes	1	2
Paraguay	Carlos Franco	0	3
Spain	Miguel Ángel Jiménez	1	2
Spain	José Rivero	1	2
Spain	Miguel Ángel Martín	0	3
