= 1992 Dunhill Cup =

Coordinates: 56.351484°N 2.816147°W

Tournament information
- Dates: 15–18 October
- Location: St Andrews, Scotland
- Course: Old Course at St Andrews
- Format: Match play

Statistics
- Par: 72
- Length: 6,933 yards (6,340 m)
- Field: 16 teams of 3 players
- Prize fund: US$1,700,000
- Winner's share: US$510,000

Champion
- England (David Gilford, Steven Richardson, Jamie Spence)

The 1992 Dunhill Cup was the eighth Dunhill Cup. It was a team tournament featuring 16 countries, each represented by three players. The Cup was played 15–18 October at the Old Course at St Andrews in Scotland. The sponsor was the Alfred Dunhill company. The English team of David Gilford, Steven Richardson, and Jamie Spence beat the Scottish team of Gordon Brand Jnr, Sandy Lyle, and Colin Montgomerie in the final. It was the second win for England.

== Format ==
The Cup was a match play event played over four days. The teams were divided into four four-team groups. The top eight teams were seeded with the remaining teams randomly placed in the groups. After three rounds of round-robin play, the top team in each group advanced to a single elimination playoff.

In each team match, the three players were paired with their opponents and played 18 holes at medal match play. Tied matches were extended to a sudden-death playoff only if they affected the outcome between the two teams. The tie-breaker for ties within a group was based on the total team score.

== Group play ==
=== Round one ===
Group 1

United States – 3		New Zealand – 0	
Player	Score	Player	Score
Fred Couples	70	Frank Nobilo	75
Davis Love III	70	Grant Waite	76
Tom Kite	71	Greg Turner	73

Ireland – 2		South Korea – 1	
Player	Score	Player	Score
Philip Walton	77	Cho Chui-Sang	80
Christy O'Connor Jnr	77	Park Nam-Sin	77
Ronan Rafferty	74	Choi Sang-Ho	72

Park was disqualified.

Group 2

Spain – 2		Italy – 1	
Player	Score	Player	Score
Miguel Ángel Jiménez	69	Giuseppe Calì	77
José Rivero	77	Costantino Rocca	74
José María Olazábal	76	Silvio Grappasonni	76

Olazábal won on the 1st playoff hole.

England – 2		Japan – 1	
Player	Score	Player	Score
Steven Richardson	70	Masahiro Kuramoto	72
David Gilford	76	Nobumitsu Yuhara	76
Jamie Spence	77	Hiroshi Makino	70

Gilford won on the first playoff hole.

Group 3

Scotland – 3		Canada – 0	
Player	Score	Player	Score
Gordon Brand Jnr	75	Danny Mijovic	81
Colin Montgomerie	71	Brent Franklin	72
Sandy Lyle	71	Richard Zokol	74

Sweden – 2		France – 1	
Player	Score	Player	Score
Robert Karlsson	77	Jean van de Velde	73
Per-Ulrik Johansson	75	Thomas Levet	77
Anders Forsbrand	74	Marc Farry	75

Group 4

Australia – 2.5		Germany – 0.5	
Player	Score	Player	Score
Greg Norman	72	Bernhard Langer	72
Rodger Davis	78	Heinz-Peter Thül	81
Ian Baker-Finch	75	Torsten Giedeon	81

South Africa – 3		Thailand – 0	
Player	Score	Player	Score
John Bland	78	Sanil Sophon	80
Ernie Els	77	Boonchu Ruangkit	82
David Frost	78	Thaworn Wiratchant	85

=== Round two ===
Group 1

United States – 3		South Korea – 0	
Player	Score	Player	Score
Fred Couples	70	Park Nam-Sin	78
Tom Kite	70	Choi Sang-Ho	74
Davis Love III	72	Cho Chui-Sang	79

Ireland – 1		New Zealand – 2	
Player	Score	Player	Score
Ronan Rafferty	68	Frank Nobilo	67
Philip Walton	72	Grant Waite	70
Christy O'Connor Jnr	68	Greg Turner	74

Group 2

Japan – 3		Spain – 0	
Player	Score	Player	Score
Nobumitsu Yuhara	72	Miguel Ángel Jiménez	77
Hiroshi Makino	71	José Rivero	76
Masahiro Kuramoto	71	José María Olazábal	72

England – 2		Italy – 1	
Player	Score	Player	Score
Jamie Spence	71	Costantino Rocca	70
David Gilford	71	Giuseppe Calì	74
Steven Richardson	70	Silvio Grappasonni	78

Group 3

Scotland – 3		France – 0	
Player	Score	Player	Score
Gordon Brand Jnr	75	Marc Farry	78
Colin Montgomerie	71	Thomas Levet	78
Sandy Lyle	70	Jean van de Velde	71

Sweden – 0		Canada – 3	
Player	Score	Player	Score
Robert Karlsson	75	Brent Franklin	71
Anders Forsbrand	74	Richard Zokol	72
Per-Ulrik Johansson	75	Danny Mijovic	74

Group 4

Australia – 3		Thailand – 0	
Player	Score	Player	Score
Greg Norman	69	Boonchu Ruangkit	76
Ian Baker-Finch	74	Sanil Sophon	78
Rodger Davis	73	Thaworn Wiratchant	78

South Africa – 1		Germany – 2	
Player	Score	Player	Score
John Bland	77	Bernhard Langer	72
David Frost	69	Torsten Giedeon	72
Ernie Els	75	Heinz-Peter Thül	75

Thül won on the first playoff hole.

=== Round three ===
Group 1

United States – 1		Ireland – 2	
Player	Score	Player	Score
Fred Couples	73	Christy O'Connor Jnr	69
Davis Love III	74	Philip Walton	72
Tom Kite	70	Ronan Rafferty	71

South Korea – 1		New Zealand – 2	
Player	Score	Player	Score
Choi Sang-Ho	73	Frank Nobilo	75
Park Nam-Sin	76	Greg Turner	70
Cho Chui-Sang	72	Grant Waite	72

Waite won on the second playoff hole.

Group 2

Japan – 0.5		Italy – 2.5	
Player	Score	Player	Score
Hiroshi Makino	74	Costantino Rocca	70
Masahiro Kuramoto	71	Giuseppe Calì	71
Nobumitsu Yuhara	75	Silvio Grappasonni	75

Grappasonni won on the first playoff hole.

England – 1		Spain – 2	
Player	Score	Player	Score
Jamie Spence	72	José María Olazábal	70
Steven Richardson	77	Miguel Ángel Jiménez	73
David Gilford	69	José Rivero	73

Group 3

Scotland – 1		Sweden – 2	
Player	Score	Player	Score
Gordon Brand Jnr	75	Robert Karlsson	71
Colin Montgomerie	70	Per-Ulrik Johansson	74
Sandy Lyle	74	Anders Forsbrand	70

France – 1		Canada – 2	
Player	Score	Player	Score
Jean van de Velde	75	Danny Mijovic	73
Marc Farry	76	Brent Franklin	73
Thomas Levet	73	Richard Zokol	75

Group 4

Australia – 2.5		South Africa – 0.5	
Player	Score	Player	Score
Ian Baker-Finch	74	David Frost	75
Rodger Davis	75	John Bland	75
Greg Norman	67	Ernie Els	70

Thailand – 1		Germany – 2	
Player	Score	Player	Score
Thaworn Wiratchant	77	Torsten Giedeon	79
Boonchu Ruangkit	77	Bernhard Langer	72
Sanil Sophon	76	Heinz-Peter Thül	76

Thül won on the first playoff hole.

=== Standings ===
Group 1
Country	W	L	Score	MW	ML
United States	2	1	640	7	2
Ireland	2	1	648	5	4
New Zealand	2	1	652	4	5
South Korea	0	3	681	2	7

Group 2
Country	W	L	Score	MW	ML
England	2	1	653	5	4
Spain	2	1	663	4	5
Japan	1	2	652	4.5	4.5
Italy	1	2	665	4.5	4.5

Group 3
Country	W	L	Score	MW	ML
Scotland	2	1	652	7	2
Canada	2	1	665	5	4
Sweden	2	1	665	4	5
France	0	3	676	2	7

Group 4
Country	W	L	Score	MW	ML
Australia	3	0	657	8	1
Germany	2	1	680	4.5	4.5
South Africa	1	2	674	4.5	4.5
Thailand	0	3	709	1	8

== Playoffs ==
=== Bracket ===
Semi-finals
1	United States	1
5	England	2
2	Australia	1
3	Scotland	2

Final
5	England	2.5
3	Scotland	0.5

=== Semi-finals ===
United States – 1		England – 2	
Player	Score	Player	Score
Fred Couples	70	David Gilford	69
Davis Love III	71	Steven Richardson	68
Tom Kite	71	Jamie Spence	72

Australia – 1		Scotland – 2	
Player	Score	Player	Score
Ian Baker-Finch	72	Colin Montgomerie	68
Rodger Davis	73	Sandy Lyle	69
Greg Norman	68	Gordon Brand Jnr	73

=== Final ===
England – 2.5		Scotland – 0.5	
Player	Score	Player	Score
Steven Richardson	71	Gordon Brand Jnr	73
Jamie Spence	69	Colin Montgomerie	69
David Gilford	71	Sandy Lyle	74

== Team results ==
Country	Place	W	L	MW	ML	Seed
England	1	4	1	9.5	5.5	5
Scotland	2	3	2	9.5	5.5	3
Australia	T3	3	1	9	3	2
United States	T3	2	2	8	4	1
Canada	T5	2	1	5	4	
Germany	T5	2	1	4.5	4.5	
Ireland	T5	2	1	5	4	8
New Zealand	T5	2	1	4	5	
Spain	T5	2	1	4	5	4
Sweden	T5	2	1	4	5	6
Italy	T11	1	2	4.5	4.5	
Japan	T11	1	2	4.5	4.5	
South Africa	T11	1	2	4.5	4.5	7
France	T14	0	3	2	7	
South Korea	T14	0	3	2	7	
Thailand	T14	0	3	1	8	

== Player results ==
Country	Player	W	L
England	David Gilford	5	0
England	Steven Richardson	4	1
England	Jamie Spence	0.5	4.5
Scotland	Colin Montgomerie	4.5	0.5
Scotland	Sandy Lyle	3	2
Scotland	Gordon Brand Jnr	2	3
Australia	Greg Norman	3.5	0.5
Australia	Ian Baker-Finch	3	1
Australia	Rodger Davis	2.5	1.5
United States	Tom Kite	4	0
United States	Fred Couples	2	2
United States	Davis Love III	2	2
Canada	Brent Franklin	2	1
Canada	Danny Mijovic	2	1
Canada	Richard Zokol	1	2
Germany	Bernhard Langer	2.5	0.5
Germany	Heinz-Peter Thül	2	1
Germany	Torsten Giedeon	0	3
Ireland	Christy O'Connor Jnr	3	0
Ireland	Philip Walton	2	1
Ireland	Ronan Rafferty	0	3
New Zealand	Grant Waite	2	1
New Zealand	Frank Nobilo	1	2
New Zealand	Greg Turner	1	2
Spain	Miguel Ángel Jiménez	2	1
Spain	José María Olazábal	2	1
Spain	José Rivero	0	3
Sweden	Anders Forsbrand	2	1
Sweden	Per-Ulrik Johansson	1	2
Sweden	Robert Karlsson	1	2
Italy	Costantino Rocca	3	0
Italy	Silvio Grappasonni	1	2
Italy	Giuseppe Calì	0.5	2.5
Japan	Hiroshi Makino	2	1
Japan	Masahiro Kuramoto	1.5	1.5
Japan	Nobumitsu Yuhara	1	2
South Africa	David Frost	2	1
South Africa	John Bland	1.5	1.5
South Africa	Ernie Els	1	2
France	Thomas Levet	1	2
France	Jean van de Velde	1	2
France	Marc Farry	0	3
South Korea	Choi Sang-Ho	2	1
South Korea	Cho Chui-Sang	0	3
South Korea	Park Nam-Sin	0	3
Thailand	Boonchu Ruangkit	0	3
Thailand	Thaworn Wiratchant	1	2
Thailand	Sanil Sophon	0	3
