= Silvio Grappasonni =

Italian professional golfer (born 1962)

Personal information
- Nationality: Italy
- Born: 9 August 1962 (age 64) Como, Italy
- Height: 1.85 m (6 ft 1 in)
- Weight: 71 kg (157 lb; 11.2 st)

Career
- Sport: Golf
- Turned professional: 1984
- Former tours: European Tour; Challenge Tour; Alps Tour
- Professional wins: 5

Number of wins by tour
- Challenge Tour: 1
- Other: 4

Best results in major championships
- Masters Tournament: DNP
- PGA Championship: DNP
- U.S. Open: DNP
- The Open Championship: CUT: 1996

Silvio Grappasonni (born 9 August 1962) is an Italian professional golfer.

As an amateur Grappasoni represented Italy at the European Youths' Team Championship, the European Amateur Team Championship and at the Eisenhower Trophy.

He represented Italy six times in the World Cup between 1987 and 1997. He is the son of Ugo Grappasonni. He is a commentator on Italian Sky Sport.

== Amateur wins ==
- 1979 Italian Close Amateur Championship
- 1983 Italian Close Amateur Championship

== Professional wins (5) ==
=== Challenge Tour wins (1) ===
- 1989 Martini Trophy

=== Alps Tour wins (1) ===
No.	Date	Tournament	Winning score	Margin of victory	Runner-up
1	1 Jun 2001	Il Bipop Carire Open	−10 (70-67-69=206)	1 stroke	(Italy) Stefano Reale

=== Other wins (3) ===
- 1987 Italian PGA Championship
- 1991 Italian National Open
- 1992 Italian National Open

== Team appearances ==
Amateur

- Jacques Léglise Trophy (representing the Continent of Europe): 1978 (winners), 1979
- European Youths' Team Championship (representing Italy): 1978, 1980, 1982
- European Boys' Team Championship (representing Italy): 1982 (winners)
- European Amateur Team Championship (representing Italy): 1983
- Eisenhower Trophy (representing Italy): 1984

Professional

- World Cup (representing Italy): 1987, 1992, 1993, 1994, 1995, 1997
- Dunhill Cup (representing Italy): 1987, 1992, 1996
