= Richard Zokol =

Canadian professional golfer

Personal information
- Full name: Richard Francis Zokol
- Nationality: Canada
- Born: August 21, 1958 (age 68) Kitimat, British Columbia, Canada
- Height: 5 ft 10 in (1.78 m)
- Weight: 180 lb (82 kg; 13 st)

Career
- Sport: Golf
- College: Brigham Young University
- Turned professional: 1981
- Former tour: PGA Tour
- Professional wins: 5

Number of wins by tour
- PGA Tour: 1
- Korn Ferry Tour: 1
- Other: 3

Best results in major championships
- Masters Tournament: CUT: 1993
- PGA Championship: T14: 1993
- U.S. Open: T32: 2000
- The Open Championship: DNP

Achievements and awards
- Canadian Golf Hall of Fame: 2011

Richard Francis "Dick" Zokol (born August 21, 1958) is a Canadian professional golfer who has played on the Canadian Tour, PGA Tour and Nationwide Tour, winning at least one event in each venue.

== Amateur career ==
Zokol was born in Kitimat, British Columbia. He attended Brigham Young University in Provo, Utah, and was the captain of the 1981 NCAA championship golf team. He was also an All-American selection in 1981, on the Second Team. He was a teammate of future fellow PGA Tour players Rick Fehr, Keith Clearwater and Bobby Clampett; he was Clampett's roommate for three years. He won the 1981 Canadian Amateur Championship, in a one-hole sudden death playoff over Blaine McCallister.

== Professional career ==
In 1981, he turned professional and joined the PGA Tour later in 1981. Zokol had 20 top-10 finishes in PGA Tour events during his career, including two wins in 1992 but only one that is considered official. His best finish in a major championship was T14 at the 1993 PGA Championship.

Zokol has suffered from various injuries during his career, and has taken time off to pursue other business ventures including "Director of Golf" for Eaglequest Golf Centers, Inc., a North American golf center consolidator. He lives in White Rock, British Columbia and also works with the Royal Canadian Golf Association, advising on elite player development.

== Amateur wins ==
- 1981 Canadian Amateur Championship

== Professional wins (5) ==
=== PGA Tour wins (1) ===
No.	Date	Tournament	Winning score	Margin of victory	Runner-up
1	Sep 6, 1992	Greater Milwaukee Open	−19 (67-71-64-67=268)	2 strokes	(United States) Dick Mast

=== Buy.com Tour wins (1) ===
No.	Date	Tournament	Winning score	Margin of victory	Runner-up
1	Jun 10, 2001	Samsung Canadian PGA Championship	−17 (67-68-70-66=271)	3 strokes	(United States) Gary Hallberg

=== Canadian Tour wins (1) ===
- 1982 British Columbia Open

=== Other wins (2) ===
No.	Date	Tournament	Winning score	Margin of victory	Runners-up
1	Aug 12, 1984	Utah Open	−11 (69-67-69=205)	1 stroke	(United States) Tom Costello, (United States) Mike Reid
2	Apr 12, 1992	Deposit Guaranty Golf Classic	−13 (67-67-66-67=267)	1 stroke	(United States) Mike Donald, (United States) Bob Eastwood, (United States) Mike Nicolette, (United States) Greg Twiggs

== Results in major championships ==
Tournament	1984	1985	1986	1987	1988	1989
Masters Tournament						
U.S. Open		CUT				T46
PGA Championship	T39				T17	

Tournament	1990	1991	1992	1993	1994	1995	1996	1997	1998	1999	2000	2001
Masters Tournament				CUT								
U.S. Open			T33							CUT	T32	T62
PGA Championship				T14	T30							

Note: Zokol never played in The Open Championship.

Did not play

CUT = missed the half-way cut
"T" = tied

== Team appearances ==
Amateur

- Eisenhower Trophy (representing Canada): 1980

Professional

- World Cup (representing Canada): 1992, 1993
- Dunhill Cup (representing Canada): 1986, 1987, 1988, 1989, 1992, 1993

== See also ==
- Fall 1981 PGA Tour Qualifying School graduates
- 1982 PGA Tour Qualifying School graduates
- 1986 PGA Tour Qualifying School graduates
- 1989 PGA Tour Qualifying School graduates
- 1991 PGA Tour Qualifying School graduates
- 2001 Buy.com Tour graduates
