= 1987 World Cup (men's golf) =

Tournament information
- Dates: November 18–21
- Location: Kapalua, Hawaii, U.S. 21°00′05″N 156°39′15″W
- Courses: Kapalua Resort, Bay Course
- Format: 72 holes stroke play combined score

Statistics
- Par: 72
- Length: 6,671 yards (6,100 m)
- Field: 32 two-man teams
- Cut: None
- Prize fund: US$750,000
- Winner's share: $200,000 team $50,000 individual

Champion
- Wales; Ian Woosnam & David Llewellyn
- 574 (−2)

Location map
- Location in the Pacific Ocean Location on Maui in the state of Hawaii

The 1987 World Cup took place November 18–21 at Kapalua Resort, Bay Course, in Kapalua, Hawaii, United States. It was the 33rd World Cup event. The previous World Cup was played in 1985, since the 1986 event was cancelled. It was a stroke play team event with 32 teams. Each team consisted of two players from a country. The combined score of each team determined the team results. The Wales team of Ian Woosnam and David Llewellyn won after a sudden death playoff over the Scotland team of Sandy Lyle and Sam Torrance. It was the first playoff for the team title in the event's history. The individual competition was won by Woosnam, five strokes ahead of Lyle.

== Teams ==
Country	Players
Argentina	Eduardo Romero and Armando Saavedra
Austria	Oswald Gartenmaier and Franz Laimer
Australia	Rodger Davis and Ossie Moore
Belgium	Vincent Duysters and Philippe Toussaint
Bermuda	Dwayne Pearman and Keith Smith
Brazil	Priscillo Diniz and Rafael Navarro
Canada	Dave Barr and Jerry Anderson
Colombia	Rigoberto Velásquez and Eduardo Martinez
Denmark	Anders Sørensen and Steen Tinning
England	Mark James and Howard Clark
Fiji	Arun Kumar and Bose Lutunatabua
France	Emmanuel Dussart and Marc Farry
Hong Kong	Yau Sui Ming and Alex Tang
Ireland	Ronan Rafferty and Eamonn Darcy
Italy	Giuseppe Calì and Silvio Grappasonni
Japan	Koichi Suzuki and Katsunari Takahashi
Malaysia	Marimuthu Ramayah and Nazamuddin Yusof
Mexico	Ernesto Perez Acosta and Feliciano Esparza
New Zealand	Frank Nobilo and Greg Turner
Philippines	Eduardo Bagtas and Mario Siodina
Portugal	Carlos Aleixo and Rogerio Valente
Scotland	Sandy Lyle and Sam Torrance
Singapore	Lim Kian Kee and Madasamy Murugiah
South Korea	Choi Yoon-soo and Kim Sung-ho
Spain	José María Cañizares and José Rivero
Sweden	Mats Lanner and Ove Sellberg
Switzerland	Carlos Duran and Alain Jeanquartier
Taiwan	Hsieh Yu-shu and Lin Chia
United States	Ben Crenshaw and Payne Stewart
Venezuela	Ramón Muñoz and Julian Santana
Wales	Ian Woosnam and David Llewellyn
West Germany	Oliver Ekstein and Torsten Giedeon

== Scores ==
Team

Place	Country	Score	To par	Money (US$) (per team)
1	Wales	143-145-138-148=574	−2	200,000
2	Scotland	143-140-142-149=574	−2	110,000
3	United States	140-146-142-148=576	E	80,000
T4	Australia	143-144-142-151=580	+4	53,000
T4	Ireland	141-147-142-150=580	+4	53,000
6	Argentina	143-146-140-153=582	+6	30,000
7	Sweden	143-144-143-153=583	+7	20,000
T8	Canada	144-145-146-149=584	+8	13,000
T8	Taiwan	150-142-147-145=584	+8	13,000
10	England	142-153-145-148=588	+12	8,000
11	Japan	143-146-149-154=592	+16	5,000
T12	Denmark	146-153-147-149=595	+19	5,000
T12	New Zealand	147-147-147-154=595	+19	5,000
T14	Spain	149-153-145-153=600	+24	5,000
T14	West Germany	149-155-144-152=600	+24	5,000
16	Italy	145-153-148-156=602	+26	5,000
17	Mexico	153-155-149-149=606	+30	5,000
18	France	153-154-145-155=607	+31	5,000
T19	Colombia	149-154-151-156=610	+34	5,000
T19	Philippines	146-160-149-155=610	+34	5,000
T21	Brazil	144-159-154-155=612	+36	5,000
T21	Venezuela	152-156-149-155=612	+36	5,000
23	Austria	155-155-153-152=615	+39	5,000
24	South Korea	159-159-151-154=623	+47	5,000
T25	Malaysia	158-159-156-160=633	+56	5,000
T25	Switzerland	150-164-155-164=633	+56	5,000
27	Portugal	152-161-154-167=634	+58	5,000
28	Hong Kong	156-159-157-165=637	+61	5,000
29	Bermuda	158-161-156-163=638	+62	5,000
30	Fiji	161-164-156-161=642	+66	5,000
31	Belgium	151-159-167-168=645	+69	5,000
32	Singapore	162-170-155-164=651	+75	5,000

Wales won after a sudden death playoff, with a par from each of the two players in the team, on the second extra hole.

International Trophy

Place	Player	Country	Score	To par	Money (US$)
1	Ian Woosnam	Wales	67-70-65-72=274	−14	50,000
2	Sandy Lyle	Scotland	68-69-71-71=279	−9	
3	Koichi Suzuki	Japan	67-70-65-72=283	−5	
T4	Ben Crenshaw	United States	70-73-69-74=286	−2	
T4	Armando Saavedra	Argentina	70-75-67-74=286	−2	
6	Ronan Rafferty	Ireland	70-71-69-77=287	−1	
T7	Hsieh Yu-shu	Taiwan	75-70-74-69=288	E	
T7	Ove Sellberg	Sweden	71-73-70-74=288	E	
T9	Howard Clark	England	68-77-73-71=289	+1	
T9	Rodger Davis	Australia	73-71-73-79=289	+1	
