= 1984 Eisenhower Trophy =

Coordinates: 22.496°N 114.120°E

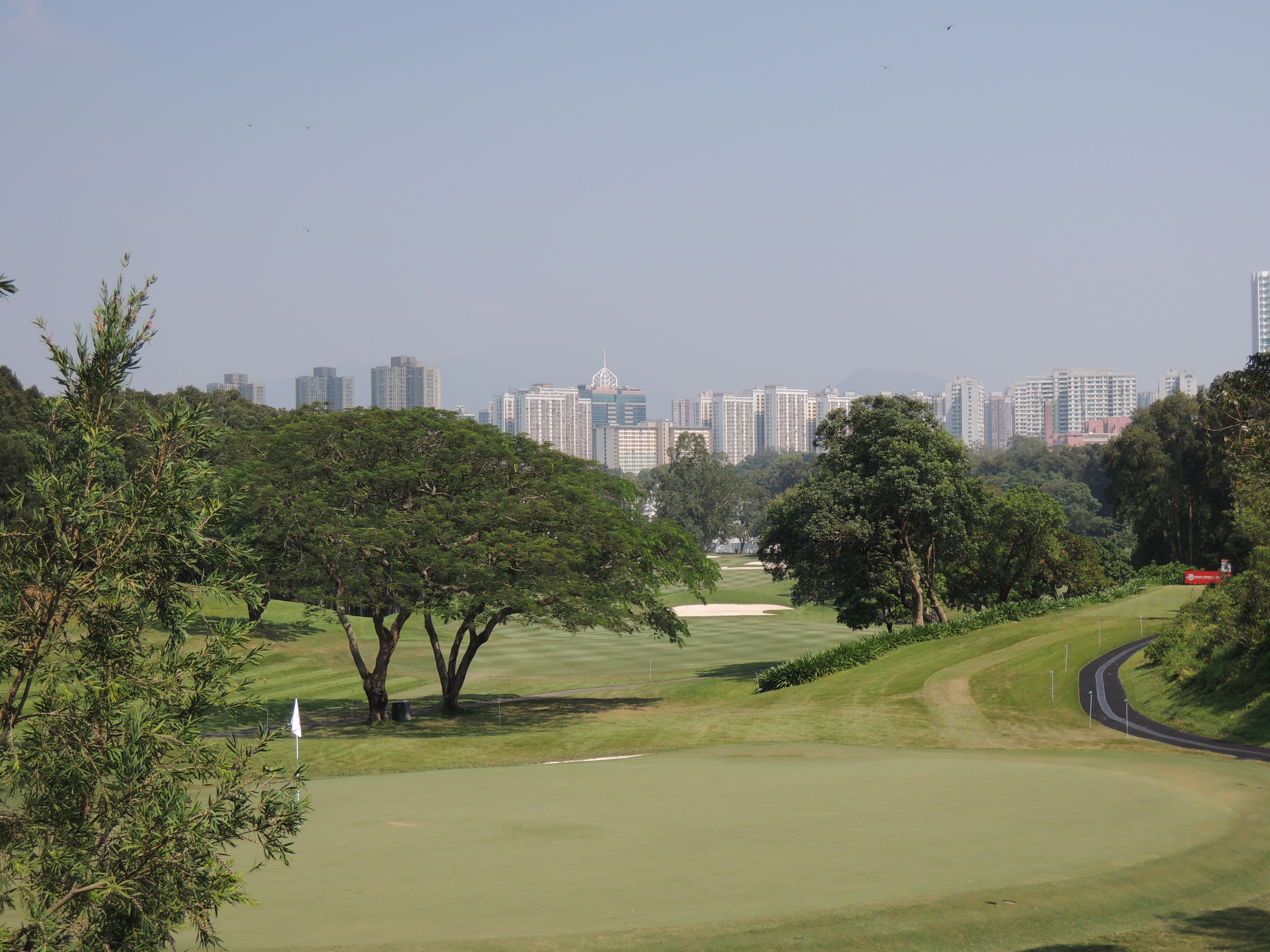
- Eden Course at Royal Hong Kong Golf Club

Tournament information
- Dates: 30 October – 2 November
- Location: Fanling, Hong Kong
- Course: Royal Hong Kong Golf Club
- Format: 72 holes stroke play

Statistics
- Par: 72
- Length: 6,757 yards (6,179 m)
- Field: 38 teams 152 players

Champion
- Japan; Kazuhiko Kato, Noriaki Kimura, Kiyotaka Oie & Tetsuo Sakata
- 870 (+6)

The 1984 Eisenhower Trophy took place 30 October to 2 November at the Royal Hong Kong Golf Club in Fanling, Hong Kong. It was the 14th World Amateur Team Championship for the Eisenhower Trophy. The tournament was a 72-hole stroke play team event with 38 four-man teams. The best three scores for each round counted towards the team total.

Japan won the Eisenhower Trophy for the first time, finishing seven strokes ahead of the silver medalists, United States. The Philippines took the bronze medal, a further two strokes behind with Great Britain and Ireland finishing fourth. The United States had a poor second round, scoring 234 to Japan's 214, and were unable to catch the Japanese in the final two rounds. Luis Carbonetti, representing Argentina, and Tetsuo Sakata from Japan had the lowest individual scores, 2-under-par 286. Carbonetti had been the lowest individual scorer in 1982.

== Teams ==
38 four-man teams contested the event.

The following table lists the players on the leading teams.

| Country | Players |
|---|---|
| Argentina | Luis Carbonetti, Fernando Chiesa, Jorge Nicolosi, Jaime Nougues |
| Australia | Neil Crafter, Tony Dight, Gerard Power, David Smith |
| Canada | Danny Mijovic, Ward Stouffer, Bill Swartz, Bob Wylie |
| France | Emmanuel Dussart, Alexis Godillot, François Illouz, Philippe Ploujoux |
| Great Britain & Ireland | David Gilford, Peter McEvoy, Garth McGimpsey, Colin Montgomerie |
| Italy | Alberto Binaghi, Emanuele Bolognesi, Silvio Grappasonni, Enrico Nistri |
| Japan | Kazuhiko Kato, Noriaki Kimura, Kiyotaka Oie, Tetsuo Sakata |
| New Zealand | Michael Barltrop, Terry Cochrane, Greg Turner, John Williamson |
| Philippines | Guillermo Ababa, Antolin Fernando, Robert Pactolerin, Carito Villaroman |
| Sweden | Mikael Högberg, John Lindberg, Jesper Parnevik, Carl-Magnus Strömberg |
| United States | John Inman, Jay Sigel, Randy Sonnier, Scott Verplank |

== Scores ==
| Place | Country | Score | To par |
|---|---|---|---|
| 1st place, gold medalist(s) | Japan | 215-214-222-219=870 | +6 |
| 2nd place, silver medalist(s) | United States | 209-234-218-216=877 | +13 |
| 3rd place, bronze medalist(s) | Philippines | 219-218-222-220=879 | +15 |
| 4 | Great Britain & Ireland | 213-220-219-228=880 | +16 |
| 5 | Canada | 218-229-221-214=882 | +18 |
| 6 | New Zealand | 217-217-224-225=883 | +19 |
| 7 | France | 221-226-216-222=885 | +21 |
| 8 | Sweden | 224-219-220-226=889 | +25 |
| 9 | Argentina | 214-230-222-226=892 | +28 |
| 10 | Italy | 221-229-221-223=894 | +30 |
| 11 | Spain | 218-228-220-229=895 | +31 |
| 12 | Greece | 221-229-224-225=899 | +35 |
| T13 | Chile | 221-223-225-231=900 | +36 |
| T13 | Malaysia | 215-226-230-229=900 | +36 |
| T15 | Denmark | 225-226-230-225=906 | +42 |
| T15 | South Korea | 229-221-229-227=906 | +42 |
| 17 | Netherlands | 227-222-227-233=909 | +45 |
| 18 | West Germany | 229-228-227-227=911 | +47 |
| 19 | Australia | 229-231-226-227=913 | +49 |
| 20 | Hong Kong | 232-227-233-228=920 | +56 |
| 21 | Venezuela | 236-232-222-232=922 | +58 |
| 22 | Switzerland | 226-234-228-236=924 | +60 |
| 23 | Indonesia | 228-232-232-233=925 | +61 |
| 24 | India | 228-239-224-235=926 | +62 |
| 25 | Austria | 228-230-232-238=928 | +64 |
| 26 | Mexico | 232-231-232-236=931 | +67 |
| T27 | Thailand | 227-234-233-239=933 | +69 |
| T27 | Zimbabwe | 232-239-228-234=933 | +69 |
| 29 | Fiji | 236-231-233-236=936 | +72 |
| 30 | Brazil | 227-238-241-231=937 | +73 |
| 31 | Bermuda | 236-235-233-235=939 | +75 |
| 32 | Belgium | 232-230-240-238=940 | +76 |
| 33 | Pakistan | 232-231-235-244=942 | +78 |
| 34 | Norway | 242-239-226-236=943 | +79 |
| 35 | Trinidad and Tobago | 232-239-239-241=951 | +87 |
| 36 | Singapore | 236-241-232-245=954 | +90 |
| 37 | Papua New Guinea | 234-248-234-248=964 | +100 |
| 38 | Bahamas | 248-247-247-248=990 | +126 |

== Individual leaders ==
There was no official recognition for the lowest individual scores.

| Place | Player | Country | Score | To par |
|---|---|---|---|---|
| T1 | Luis Carbonetti | Argentina | 68-74-70-74=286 | −2 |
| T1 | Tetsuo Sakata | Japan | 68-72-74-72=286 | −2 |
| 3 | Randy Sonnier | United States | 70-78-72-69=289 | +1 |
| T4 | Emmanuel Dussart | France | 71-78-70-71=290 | +2 |
| T4 | Bart Nolte | Netherlands | 72-71-75-72=290 | +2 |
| T6 | Greg Turner | New Zealand | 67-77-74-73=291 | +3 |
| T6 | Scott Verplank | United States | 69-77-72-73=291 | +3 |
| T8 | Roy Mackenzie | Chile | 75-72-69-76=292 | +4 |
| T8 | Robert Pactolerin | Philippines | 72-79-72-69=292 | +4 |
| 10 | Kazuhiko Kato | Japan | 73-72-75-73=293 | +5 |
