= 1995 World Cup of Golf =

Tournament information
- Dates: 9–12 November
- Location: Shenzhen, Dongguan, Guangdong, China; 22°47′9″N 114°0′25″E
- Courses: Mission Hills Golf Club, Shenzhen, World Cup Course
- Format: 72 holes stroke play combined score

Statistics
- Par: 72
- Length: 7,039 yards (6,436 m)
- Field: 32 two-man teams
- Cut: None
- Prize fund: US$1,300,000 team US$200,000 individual
- Winner's share: $400,000 team $100,000 individual

Champion
- United States; Fred Couples & Davis Love III
- 543 (−33)

Location map
- Location in China Location in Guangdong

The 1995 World Cup of Golf took place 9–12 November at the Mission Hills Golf Club in Shenzhen, Dongguan, Guangdong, China. It was the 41st World Cup. The tournament was a 72-hole stroke play team event with each team consisting of two players from a country. The combined score of each team determined the team results. Individuals also competed for the International Trophy. The prize money totaled $1,500,000 with $400,000 going to the winning pair and $100,000 to the top individual. The United States team of Fred Couples and Davis Love won, for a record fourth time in a row with the same players in the team, by 14 strokes over the Australia team of Brett Ogle and Robert Allenby. Love took the International Trophy after a playoff over Hisayuki Sasaki of Japan.

== Teams ==
Country	Players
Argentina	Eduardo Romero and César Monasterio
Australia	Robert Allenby and Brett Ogle
Canada	Rick Gibson and Jim Rutledge
China	Zhang Lianwei and Cheng Jun
Colombia	Jesús Amaya and Ángel Romero
Denmark	Steen Tinning and Anders Sørensen
England	Paul Broadhurst and Mark Roe
Finland	Anssi Kankkonen and Kalle Väinölä
France	Jean van de Velde and Jean-Louis Guépy
Germany	Alex Čejka and Sven Strüver
Ireland	Darren Clarke and Philip Walton
Italy	Silvio Grappasonni and Costantino Rocca
Japan	Hiroshi Gohda and Hisayuki Sasaki
Malaysia	Ali Kadir and Marimuthu Ramayah
Mexico	Rafael Alarcón and Esteban Toledo
Netherlands	Rolf Muntz and Joost Steenkamer
New Zealand	Frank Nobilo and Michael Campbell
Paraguay	Gregorio Nelson Cabrera and Marco Ruiz
Peru	Luis Felipe Graf and Niceforo Quispe
Philippines	Frankie Miñoza and Robert Pctolerin
Scotland	Andrew Coltart and Sam Torrance
South Africa	Hendrik Buhrmann and Retief Goosen
South Korea	Choi Sang-ho and Choi Gwang-soo
Spain	Ignacio Garrido and Santiago Luna
Sri Lanka	Nandasena Perera and Koswinna Chandradasa
Sweden	Jarmo Sandelin and Jesper Parnevik
Switzerland	André Bossert and Paolo Quirici
Thailand	Thammanoon Sriroj and Udorn Duangdecha
United States	Fred Couples and Davis Love III
Venezuela	Henrique Lavie and Emilio Miartuz
Wales	Mark Mouland and Phillip Price
Zimbabwe	Tony Johnstone and Mark McNulty

== Scores ==
Team

Place	Country	Score	To par	Money (US$) (per team)
1	United States	133-136-138-136=543	−33	400,000
2	Australia	138-144-137-138=557	−19	200,000
T3	Japan	139-141-137-141=558	−18	112,500
T3	Scotland	138-144-136-140=558	−18	112,500
5	New Zealand	142-141-137-139=559	−17	80,000
T6	France	141-141-140-139=561	−15	52,500
T6	Ireland	141-140-140-140=561	−15	52,500
8	South Africa	145-139-136-143=563	−13	32,000
9	Sweden	136-137-146-145=564	−12	28,000
T10	Mexico	142-137-141-145=565	−11	22,000
T10	Zimbabwe	138-150-137-140=565	−11	22,000
T12	Italy	142-143-136-145=566	−10	16,000
T12	Switzerland	144-145-144-133=566	−10	16,000
14	Germany	144-143-141-139=567	−9	13,000
15	Spain	140-146-144-139=569	−7	11,000
16	Wales	141-144-143-142=570	−6	10,000
17	Canada	139-149-142-141=571	−5	9,000
18	Netherlands	143-145-141-143=572	−4	8,800
19	Finland	148-141-148-141=578	+2	8,600
T20	England	141-143-148-148=580	+4	8,200
T20	Paraguay	144-145-146-145=580	+4	8,200
T20	Philippines	143-148-145-144=580	+4	8,200
23	Argentina	142-153-144-143=582	+6	7,800
T24	Denmark	148-145-141-149=583	+7	7,500
T24	South Korea	149-145-145-144=583	+7	7,500
26	Thailand	150-143-147-145=585	+9	7,200
27	China	151-148-142-147=588	+12	7,000
28	Venezuela	154-146-145-144=589	+13	6,800
29	Malaysia	140-152-152-146=590	+14	6,600
30	Colombia	149-145-149-153=596	+20	6,400
31	Sri Lanka	155-145-152-151=603	+27	6,200
32	Peru	158-158-161-157=634	+58	6,000

International Trophy

Place	Player	Country	Score	To par	Money (US$)
1	Davis Love III	United States	65-67-68-67=267	−21	100,000
2	Hisayuki Sasaki	Japan	62-69-67-69=267	−21	50,000
3	Sam Torrance	Scotland	68-70-64-69=271	−17	25,000
4	Costantino Rocca	Italy	70-68-64-72=274	−14	
T5	Michael Campbell	New Zealand	69-71-67-68=275	−13	
T5	Darren Clarke	Ireland	68-69-69-69=275	−13	
T5	Retief Goosen	South Africa	71-66-66-72=275	−13	
T8	Fred Couples	United States	68-69-70-69=276	−12	
T8	Santiago Luna	Spain	69-71-69-70=276	−12	
10	Jesper Parnevik	Sweden	67-66-73-71=277	−11	

Love won in a playoff with a par on the 5th extra hole.
