= 2000 EPD Tour =

Golf tour season

2000 EPD Tour season
- Duration: 6 May 2000 – 8 September 2000
- Number of official events: 12
- Most wins: (Germany) Marc Amort (2)
- Order of Merit: (Czech Republic) Karel Skopový

The 2000 EPD Tour was the fourth season of the EPD Tour, a third-tier tour recognised by the European Tour.

== Schedule ==
The following table lists official events during the 2000 season.

Date	Tournament	Host country	Purse (DM)	Winner (Note: The number in brackets after each winner's name is the number of EPD Tour events they had won up to and including that tournament. It is rare for someone to accumulate many wins on the EPD Tour as success at this level usually leads to promotion to the Challenge Tour.)
7 May	Royal Gruyere Pro-Am	Switzerland	15,000	(Austria) Ulf Wendling (1)
16 May	Jakobsberg Classic	Germany	15,000	(Germany) Torsten Giedeon (1)
30 May	Schärding Pramatal Classic	Austria	15,000	(Czech Republic) Jiří Janda (1)
6 Jun	Lichtenau Classic	Germany	15,000	(Germany) Christian Arenz (1)
20 Jun	Sinzing Point Tournament	Germany	15,000	(England) Chris Guy (1)
27 Jun	Spessart Classic	Germany	15,000	(England) Michael Hearn (1)
4 Jul	Reichswald Classic	Germany	15,000	(Germany) Marc Amort (1)
25 Jul	Meerbusch Classic	Germany	15,000	(Czech Republic) Karel Skopový (1)
8 Aug	Gut Ludwigsberg Classic	Germany	15,000	(Germany) Marc Amort (2)
22 Aug	Schloß Miel Classic	Germany	15,000	(Italy) Marc-Pierre Campos (1)
29 Aug	Königsfeld Classic	Germany	15,000	(Germany) Patrick Platz (1)
8 Sep	EPD Tour Championship	Germany	15,000	(Germany) Philip Drewes (1)

== Order of Merit ==
The Order of Merit was based on tournament results during the season, calculated using a points-based system.

Position	Player	Points
1	(Czech Republic) Karel Skopový	2,025
2	(Netherlands) Stéphane Lovey	1,986
3	(Germany) Marc Amort	1,739
4	(Scotland) Roger Gallagher	1,623
5	(England) Paul Herbert	1,570
