= Jean-Louis Guépy =

French professional golfer

Personal information
- Nationality: France
- Born: 25 May 1967 (age 59) New Caledonia
- Height: 1.88 m (6 ft 2 in)

Career
- Sport: Golf
- Turned professional: 1991
- Former tours: European Tour; Challenge Tour; PGA Tour of Australasia; Alps Tour
- Professional wins: 2

Number of wins by tour
- Challenge Tour: 1
- Other: 1

Best results in major championships
- Masters Tournament: DNP
- PGA Championship: DNP
- U.S. Open: DNP
- The Open Championship: CUT: 1998

Jean-Louis Guépy (born 25 May 1967) is a French professional golfer from New Caledonia. Guépy was originally a tennis pro but abruptly quit at the age of 20. Despite having no background in golf he then trained to be a professional golfer. Within years of picking up the game Guépy earned membership on the PGA Tour of Australasia and European Tour. Though he never won on either tour, he recorded runner-up finishes in three prominent international events, including to world #1 Greg Norman at the 1996 Ford South Australian Open.

== Early life ==
Guépy was born and raised in New Caledonia, a French territory in the Pacific. He originally wanted to be a tennis professional. The game was part of the family as his father, George, was a local tennis president in New Caledonia. As a young adult, Guépy peaked within the top ten of France and Australia's amateur tennis rankings. He defeated Australian pro Jason Stoltenberg at an event in Europe. He reached the low #200s in the professional rankings. He quit playing tennis at the age of 20, however. "Tennis was no more fun for me," he stated later in life. He did not play golf at all until he was 20 years old.

== Professional career ==
Guépy declared himself to be a professional golfer at the age of 24. Soon afterwards, he was conscripted into the French National Service. His service lasted two years.

Shortly thereafter, he joined the Challenge Tour, the European Tour's developmental tour. He played in 11 events in 1992, making the cut in all of them, including a top-10 performance. He finished 73rd on the Order of Merit. The following season, he played full-time on the Challenge Tour. He finished in the top-10 in 11 of 20 tournaments entered. He won his first professional event, the Open de Vittel, and finished second on the Order of Merit to earn full playing rights on the European Tour.

Guépy had a difficult transition to the main tour, missing the cut in four of his first six events. However he played excellently in his next event, the Heineken Open Catalonia. In second round, he shot a 30 (−6) on the front nine to take a four shot lead. With strong winds in his face, he came back poorly with a 38 (+2) to lose two strokes to the field. His round included eight birdies, four pars, four bogeys, one eagle, and one double bogey. He stated afterwards, "It was a real crazy round." Guépy held a two stroke lead entering the weekend. In the third round, he shot an even-par-72 but lost ground to the field as most challengers shot under par. Argentina's José Cóceres took the lead. In the final round, Guépy played in the final group with Cóceres. Though he shot a one-under-par 71, he was outplayed by Cóceres's 69. Guépy finished in solo second, three back. Despite the disappointing weekend, this was easily the best finish of his European Tour career. Guépy was not able to advance on this good performance, however. In his remaining 15 events, he missed the cut, withdrew, or was disqualified from twelve of them. However, his high finish in Catalonia helped him finish 112th on the Order of Merit. He maintained full status on the European Tour.

Later in the year, he played in the Dunhill Cup. France played Australia in its first round of the tournament and Guépy defeated Steve Elkington in his first round match. However, France did not win its group to advance to the knock-out bracket.

In 1995, Guépy made "impressive progress" on the European Tour. In the first 10 events, he did not have much success, only completing two of them. In the summer, he began to turn it around. In early July, at the BMW International Open he shot rounds of 65–68 (−11) on the weekend to finish in a tie for fourth. Later in the summer, he recorded another top-5, finishing T-5 at the Czech Open, recording four straight rounds in the 60s. In September, he tied the course record at the Trophée Lancôme with a 62 (-8). Also in September, he held the joint first round lead of the British Masters. Overall, Guépy won £117,535 and finished 50th on the Order of Merit.

After the season ended, he played in the World Cup of Golf in Shenzhen, China. He and teammate Jean van de Velde finished at 561, in a tie for 6th with Ireland.

Soon after the World Cup, Guépy returned down under to play on the PGA Tour of Australasia. The first tournament he played was the Australian Open. In the second round, he shot a 69 (-3) to get in contention. He shot a third round 69 (−3) to reach 211 (−5) and get within one of Greg Norman and Peter McWhinney's lead. He shot a final round 70 (−2) to finish at 281 (−7). He finished the event in a tie for third place with Craig Parry earning $A49,088. A few weeks later, he played in the Greg Norman Holden International. He opened with a 70 (−3). In the second round, he shot a 63 (−10), recording 10 birdies. It was the lowest score by any player on the PGA Tour of Australasia in three years. It was also a course record. It got him to 133 (−13) and within one shot of Craig Parry's lead. He "came back to earth" with a third round 74 (+1). He was at 207 at this point, in a tie for second, four back of leader Parry. He shot a 76 (+3) in the final round and finished in a tie for 4th place with Australians Stuart Appleby and Terry Price. This excellent play would culminate at the Ford South Australian Open. Guépy was tied for the lead entering the final round with Bradley Hughes and Glenn Joyner. He was in contention for most of the day but had a "costly" three-putt on the par-5 16th for bogey. However, on the next hole he holed a bunker shot for birdie. On the 18th, he had a 15-foot birdie putt to enter a playoff with Greg Norman. However, as "20,000 people gave an agonized groan" the putt "pulled up short." Guépy finished solo runner-up, one behind Norman. He reached his career Official World Golf Ranking peak at 128 after the event.

Guépy returned to Europe in April. Despite reaching a new career peak in the global ranking, Guépy's career would not advance from this point onward. In his nine European events, he only made the cut once. In June 1996, a back injury prevented him from playing in Europe for the remainder of the season.

Guépy started playing again as a touring professional in October in Australia. His performance down under was slightly better; in nine events he made cut five times including four top-25s. This included a tie for 11th place finish at the Australian Open.

In the spring of 1997, he returned to Europe. He was granted a medical extension by the European Tour for the 1997 season. In his first event in Europe, the Spanish Open, Guépy had much success, scoring four consecutive under-par rounds. He finished in a tie for fifth, two out of a Mark James–Greg Norman playoff. Guépy did not follow up on this success, however. He missed the cut, withdrew, or was disqualified from 12 of the remaining 14 events he played in Europe. He played much better when he returned to Australia, starting the season with four straight placings in the top-12. One of those results was a joint runner-up finish at the New Zealand Open.

Due to his poor performance in 1997, Guépy did not retain his European Tour membership. He did play in two regular European Tour events, making the cut in both. He also qualified for the 1998 Open Championship. Guépy was the first player to tee off in the event. He missed the cut. It was the only major championship or PGA Tour event he would play in his career.

Like the previous seasons, he returned to play on the PGA Tour of Australia. Guépy made the cut in 4 of 8 events, including consecutive top-10s at the Heineken Classic and Greg Norman Holden International.

In 1999, he returned to Europe and played in two events in France. Like previous years he returned to Australia. He did not record any highlights during the 1999–2000 season, however. Shortly after the season ended he took a two-year break from the game.

In 2002, Guépy returned to Europe to play on the Challenge Tour. He played poorly. However, he earned his European Tour card at Q-School with a 32nd place showing.

Late in his career, Guépy was able to enter some events in the Australasian region. He held the five-way share of the lead at the midway point of the 2012 South Pacific Golf Open Championship. Two years later, Guépy attempted to qualify for the 2014 PGA Tour of Australasia but failed by two shots. He was able to play some events that year, however, including the Queensland Open.

In 2016, Guépy played in the South Pacific Open Championship in his homeland of New Caledonia. He finished in solo 23rd. The next year, he played again played an event in New Caledonia, this time the South Pacific Classic on the PGA Ladbrokes Legends Tour.

== Personal life ==
As of 1994, Guépy lived in Bordeaux, France.

== Professional wins (2) ==
=== Challenge Tour wins (1) ===
No.	Date	Tournament	Winning score	Margin of victory	Runner-up
1	16 May 1993	Open de Vittel	−8 (67-69-70-74=280)	Playoff	(France) Marc Pendariès

=== Alps Tour wins (1) ===
No.	Date	Tournament	Winning score	Margin of victory	Runner-up
1	18 May 2003	Open de Marcilly	−9 (69-68-70-72=279)	2 strokes	(France) Jean-Marc de Polo

== Results in major championships ==
Tournament	1998
The Open Championship	CUT

CUT = missed the halfway cut
Note: Guépy only played in The Open Championship.

== Team appearances ==
- Dunhill Cup (representing France): 1994
- World Cup of Golf (representing France): 1995
