= Lake Nona Golf & Country Club =

Golf club in Orlando, Florida, United States

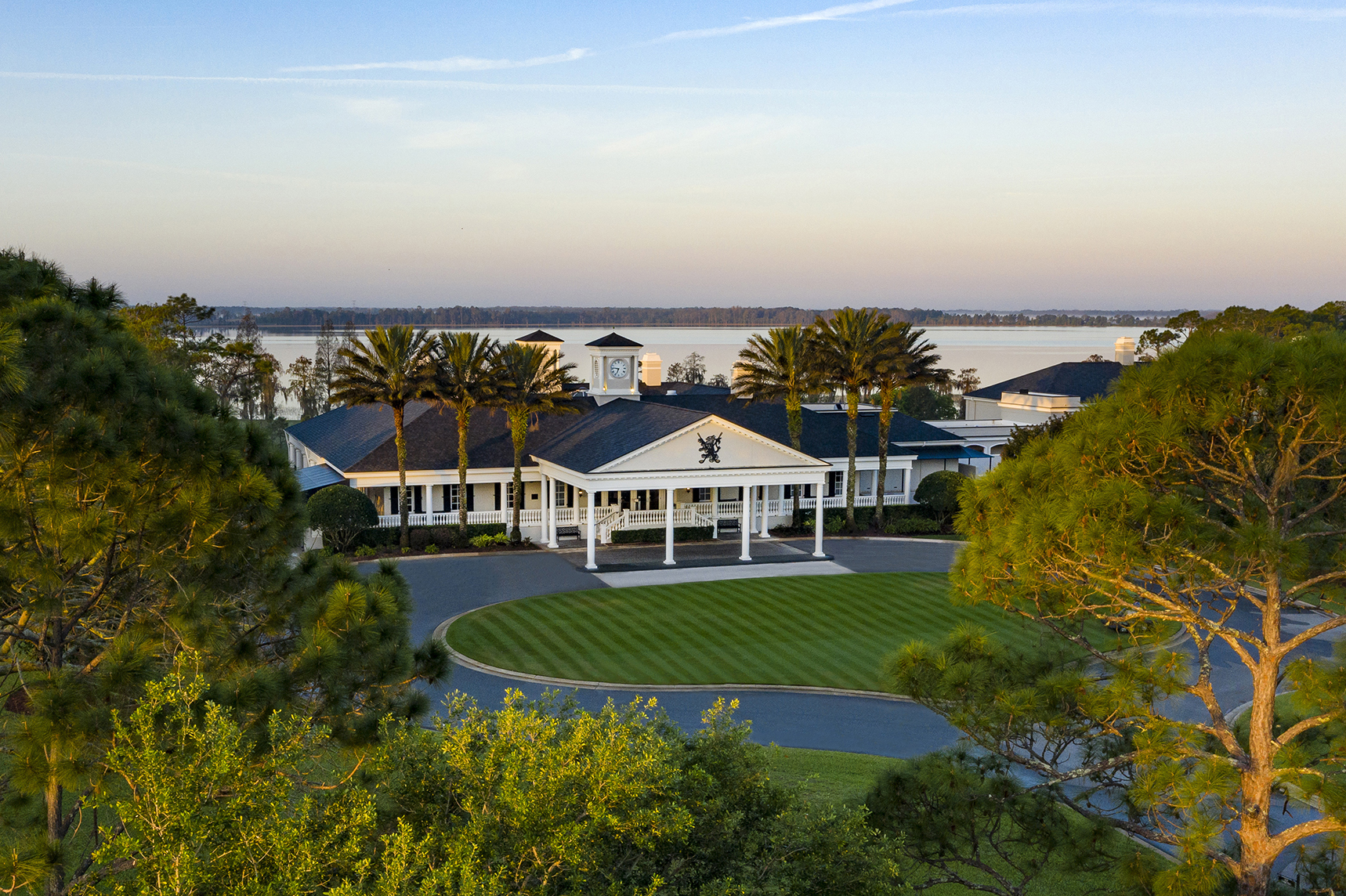
- Interactive map of Lake Nona Golf & Country Club
- 28°24′53″N 81°15′44″W

Club information
- Location: Orlando, Florida, U.S.
- Established: 1986
- Type: Private
- Total holes: 18
- Tournaments: Solheim Cup (1990); World Cup of Golf (1993); Gainbridge LPGA (2021); LPGA Tournament of Champions (2022–present); Tavistock Cup; U.S. Senior Amateur (2010)
- Website: www.lakenona.club
- Designed by: Tom Fazio
- Par: 72
- Length: 7,215 yards (6,597 m)
- Course rating: 74.6
- Slope rating: 138

Lake Nona Golf & Country Club is a private residential golf club community in southeast Orlando, Florida. The 600-acre (2.4 km^{2}) community features an 18-hole championship golf course designed by Tom Fazio. Set amidst freshwater lakes and oak, pine and cypress trees, Lake Nona Golf & Country Club offers a range of residences, including custom-built estate homes.

== Golf course ==
The championship golf course at Lake Nona was designed by Tom Fazio in 1986. It is recognized as one of the top 100 golf courses globally. The course traverses through natural pine forests and oak groves, encompassing three lakes. It offers varying levels of challenge with yardages ranging from 4,221 yards from the forward tees to 7,200 yards from the championship tees.

Hole	Par	Professional Yards	Men's Yards	Ladies Yards	Sunley Yards
1	4	424	351	322	145
2	5	563	508	451	255
3	4	451	389	336	180
4	3	198	149	95	90
5	4	359	327	253	140
6	3	209	160	105	102
7	4	442	397	316	155
8	4	427	373	327	160
9	5	534	499	441	260
10	4	441	403	367	160
11	5	582	517	424	240
12	4	418	392	342	180
13	3	157	145	122	83
14	4	318	294	253	140
15	5	578	514	441	275
16	4	461	393	360	190
17	3	198	162	123	120
18	4	440	393	311	175

== Tournaments hosted ==
Lake Nona has hosted a variety of professional and amateur golf tournaments including:

Professional

- Solheim Cup: 1990 (inaugural)
- World Cup of Golf: 1993
- U.S. Open qualifier: 1993, 2003, 2009
- U.S. Women's Open qualifier: 1993
- Tavistock Cup: 2004, 2007, 2009, 2012
- Gainbridge LPGA (LPGA Tour): 2021
- Hilton Grand Vacations Tournament of Champions (LPGA Tour): 2022, 2023, 2024

Amateur

- U.S. Senior Amateur: 2010
- Southern Amateur: 1994, 2008
- Women's Southern Amateur: 1995
- USGA Centennial Men’s State Team Tournament: 1995
- Florida State Amateur: 1989, 1999
- Florida Women’s State Amateur Championship: 1996
- Tavistock Collegiate Invitational: 2014

== Notable residents ==
Residents, past and present, include Annika Sörenstam, Graeme McDowell, Víctor Martínez, Nick Faldo, David Leadbetter, Ernie Els, Lou Holtz, Ian Poulter, Justin Rose, Henrik Stenson, Charles Woodson, Gary Woodland, Ben An, Tyrrell Hatton and Lydia Ko.
