= Tomohiro Maruyama =

Japanese golfer

Personal information
- Nationality: Japan
- Born: 7 March 1958 (age 68) Kanagawa Prefecture, Japan
- Height: 1.78 m (5 ft 10 in)
- Weight: 78 kg (172 lb; 12.3 st)

Career
- Sport: Golf
- Status: Professional
- Former tour: Japan Golf Tour
- Professional wins: 6

Number of wins by tour
- Japan Golf Tour: 3
- Other: 3

Tomohiro Maruyama (born 7 March 1958) is a Japanese professional golfer.

== Career ==
Maruyama played on the Japan Golf Tour, winning three times.

== Professional wins (6) ==
=== PGA of Japan Tour wins (3) ===
No.	Date	Tournament	Winning score	Margin of victory	Runner(s)-up
1	3 Jul 1988	Kanto Pro Championship	−10 (68-66-73-71=278)	3 strokes	(Japan) Futoshi Irino, (Japan) Yoshimi Niizeki
2	12 Dec 1993	Daikyo Open	−15 (69-67-65-68=269)	3 strokes	(Japan) Ryoken Kawagishi, (Japan) Nobuo Serizawa
3	30 Jul 1995	NST Niigata Open Golf Championship	−14 (69-70-69-66=274)	3 strokes	(Japan) Hidemichi Tanaka

PGA of Japan Tour playoff record (0–1)

No.	Year	Tournament	Opponent	Result
1	1988	Shizuoka Open	(Japan) Toshimitsu Kai	Lost to par on third extra hole

=== Japan Challenge Tour wins (1) ===
- 1985 Mito Green Open

=== Other wins (1) ===
- 1987 Acom Team Championship (with Nobuo Serizawa)

=== Japan PGA Senior Tour wins (1) ===
- 2009 Komatsu Open

== Team appearances ==
- Dunhill Cup (representing Japan): 1994
