= David Gilford =

English golfer (born 1965)

Personal information
- Full name: David Gilford
- Nationality: England
- Born: 14 September 1965 (age 61) Crewe, Cheshire, England
- Height: 5 ft 11 in (1.80 m)
- Spouse: Donna (m. 1998)
- Children: 2

Career
- Sport: Golf
- Turned professional: 1986
- Former tours: European Tour; European Senior Tour
- Professional wins: 6
- Highest ranking: 31 (11 April 1993)

Number of wins by tour
- European Tour: 6

Best results in major championships
- Masters Tournament: T24: 1995
- PGA Championship: T44: 1994
- U.S. Open: T60: 1996
- The Open Championship: T33: 1996

David Gilford (born 14 September 1965) is an English professional golfer.

== Early life and amateur career ==
In 1965, Gilford was born in Crewe. In 1981, aged just 15, he won the Carris Trophy, English Boys Under-18 Open Amateur Stroke-Play Championship, at Moor Park. In 1984, he won the English Amateur.

== Professional career ==
In 1986, Gilford turned professional. He has six wins on the European Tour, all of which came between 1991 and 1994. He finished in the top ten of the European Tour Order of Merit twice, placing 9th in 1991 and 7th in 1994. He played in the Ryder Cup in 1991 and 1995.

After reaching 50, Gilford played on the European Senior Tour, playing his first event in late 2015. His best finish came in just his second event, in June 2016, when he finished third in the SSE Enterprise Wales Senior Open after a final round 64.

== Personal life ==
Gilford is married to Donna. They have two children.

== Amateur wins ==
- 1981 Carris Trophy
- 1984 English Amateur
- 1986 Lagonda Trophy, British Youths Open Amateur Championship

== Professional wins (6) ==
=== European Tour wins (6) ===
No.	Date	Tournament	Winning score	Margin of victory	Runner(s)-up
1	18 Aug 1991	NM English Open	−10 (70-71-67-70=278)	2 strokes	(England) Roger Chapman
2	19 Apr 1992	Moroccan Open	−1 (76-73-68-70=287)	Playoff	(Sweden) Robert Karlsson
3	21 Feb 1993	Moroccan Open (2)	−9 (68-70-70-71=279)	1 stroke	(Trinidad and Tobago) Stephen Ames, (England) Jamie Spence
4	21 Mar 1993	Portuguese Open	−13 (65-66-70-74=275)	Playoff	(Argentina) Jorge Berendt
5	13 Feb 1994	Turespaña Open De Tenerife	−10 (72-70-66-70=278)	2 strokes	(England) Andrew Murray, (Spain) Juan Quirós, (Australia) Wayne Riley
6	11 Sep 1994	European Open	−13 (70-68-70-67=275)	5 strokes	(Spain) José María Olazábal, (Italy) Costantino Rocca

European Tour playoff record (2–1)

No.	Year	Tournament	Opponent	Result
1	1992	Moroccan Open	(Sweden) Robert Karlsson	Won with birdie on third extra hole
2	1993	Portuguese Open	(Argentina) Jorge Berendt	Won with birdie on first extra hole
3	2002	Algarve Open de Portugal	(Sweden) Carl Pettersson	Lost to par on first extra hole

== Results in major championships ==
Tournament	1983	1984	1985	1986	1987	1988	1989	1990	1991	1992	1993	1994	1995	1996
Masters Tournament													T24	CUT
U.S. Open											CUT		CUT	T60
The Open Championship	CUT		CUT		CUT	CUT			T80	CUT	CUT	T38	T58	T33
PGA Championship										CUT		T44		

Did not play

CUT = missed the half-way cut (3rd round cut in 1985 Open Championship)
"T" = tied

=== Summary ===
Tournament	Wins	2nd	3rd	Top-5	Top-10	Top-25	Events	Cuts made
Masters Tournament	0	0	0	0	0	1	2	1
U.S. Open	0	0	0	0	0	0	3	1
The Open Championship	0	0	0	0	0	0	10	4
PGA Championship	0	0	0	0	0	0	2	1
Totals	0	0	0	0	0	1	17	7

- Most consecutive cuts made – 3 (1994 Open Championship – 1995 Masters)
- Longest streak of top-10s – 0

== Team appearances ==
Amateur

- Jacques Léglise Trophy (representing Great Britain & Ireland): 1982 (winners)
- European Youths' Team Championship (representing England): 1984
- Eisenhower Trophy (representing Great Britain & Ireland): 1984
- European Amateur Team Championship (representing England): 1985
- Walker Cup (representing Great Britain & Ireland): 1985
- St Andrews Trophy (representing Great Britain & Ireland): 1986 (winners)

Professional

- Ryder Cup (representing Europe): 1991, 1995 (winners)
- Dunhill Cup (representing England): 1992 (winners)
- World Cup (representing England): 1992, 1993
