= Yoshimi Niizeki =

Japanese professional golfer

Personal information
- Nationality: Japan
- Born: 29 September 1954 (age 72) Yamagata, Yamagata, Japan
- Height: 1.73 m (5 ft 8 in)
- Weight: 68 kg (150 lb; 10.7 st)

Career
- Sport: Golf
- Status: Professional
- Former tour: Japan Golf Tour
- Professional wins: 5

Number of wins by tour
- Japan Golf Tour: 2
- Other: 3

Yoshimi Niizeki (born 29 September 1954) is a Japanese professional golfer.

== Career ==
Niizeki played on the Japan Golf Tour, winning twice.

== Professional wins (5) ==
=== PGA of Japan Tour wins (2) ===
No.	Date	Tournament	Winning score	Margin of victory	Runner-up
1	26 Jun 1988	Mizuno Open	−8 (69-74-68-69=280)	Playoff	(Japan) Seiichi Kanai
2	13 Aug 1989	Nikkei Cup	−9 (66-69-68-68=279)	Playoff	(Japan) Saburo Fujiki

PGA of Japan Tour playoff record (2–1)

No.	Year	Tournament	Opponent	Result
1	1988	Mizuno Open	(Japan) Seiichi Kanai	Won with birdie on first extra hole
2	1989	Pepsi Ube Kosan Open	(Japan) Akihito Yokoyama	Lost to bogey on second extra hole
3	1989	Nikkei Cup	(Japan) Saburo Fujiki	Won with par on first extra hole

=== Japan Challenge Tour wins (2) ===
- 1998 Daiwa Cup Yamanashi Open
- 1999 Aiful Challenge Cup Spring

=== Other wins (1) ===
- 1990 Kuzuha International

== Team appearances ==
- Kirin Cup (representing Japan): 1988
- World Cup (representing Japan): 1989
