= Anders Sørensen =

Danish professional golfer (born 1962)

Personal information
- Nationality: Denmark
- Born: 20 February 1962 (age 64)

Career
- Sport: Golf
- Turned professional: 1988
- Former tours: European Tour; Swedish Golf Tour
- Professional wins: 2

Best results in major championships
- Masters Tournament: DNP
- PGA Championship: DNP
- U.S. Open: DNP
- The Open Championship: T39: 1993

Anders Sørensen (born 20 February 1962) is a Danish professional golfer.

== Professional career ==
Sørensen qualified for the European Tour before the 1988 season. In his first two seasons, he made the cut in slightly more than half the events and recorded two top-10s. In 1990, his third season, would be a marked improvement. He recorded the best result of his career at the first event of the year, the Atlantic Open held in Porto, Portugal. Sørensen entered the fourth round in second place. With the collapse of overnight leader Ronald Stelten, an American player, Sørensen took a two shot lead to the 71st hole. He would falter down the stretch, however, and wind up in a six-way playoff. On the first playoff hole, in gale-force winds, he and four other competitors would make bogey or worse; Stephen McAllister's par won the event. Despite the disappointing finish, he would go on to his best year. He would make the cut in 21 of 26 events including that year's Open Championship. He finished a career-best 40th on the Order of Merit.

The following three seasons saw Sørensen play steady but not improve on his 1990 performance. He finished between 74th and 84th on the Order of Merit every year. His highlight was a second-place finish at the 1993 Hohe Brucke Austrian Open. Again, this result was resolved in a playoff; he lost to Ronan Rafferty's par on the first hole.

His 1995 and 1996 seasons were his last on the European Tour. He missed the cut in the easy majority of events and did not finish in the top 125 of the Order of Merit either season. He would not play full-time on the European Tour after the 1996 season.

== Professional wins (2) ==
=== Swedish Golf Tour wins (2) ===
No.	Date	Tournament	Winning score	Margin of victory	Runner(s)-up
1	7 Jun 1987	Nescafé Cup	−7 (68-72-71-74=285)	1 stroke	(Australia) Terry Price
2	27 Sep 1987	Volvo Albatross	−3 (73-72-68=213)	1 stroke	(Sweden) Anders Haglund, (Sweden) Leif Hederström, (Sweden) Magnus Persson

== Playoff record ==
European Tour playoff record (0–2)

No.	Year	Tournament	Opponent(s)	Result
1	1990	Vinho Verde Atlantic Open	(England) Richard Boxall, (Northern Ireland) Stephen Hamill, (Scotland) Stephen McAllister, (Northern Ireland) Ronan Rafferty, (England) David Williams	McAllister won with par on first extra hole
2	1993	Hohe Brücke Austrian Open	(Northern Ireland) Ronan Rafferty	Lost to par on first extra hole

== Results in major championships ==
Tournament	1987	1988	1989	1990	1991	1992	1993
The Open Championship	CUT		CUT	T57			T39

Note: Sørensen only played in The Open Championship.

Did not play

CUT = missed the half-way cut
"T" indicates a tie for a place

== Team appearances ==
Amateur

- European Youths' Team Championship (representing Denmark): 1979, 1981
- European Amateur Team Championship (representing Denmark): 1979, 1981, 1983, 1985
- Eisenhower Trophy (representing Denmark): 1980, 1982
- St Andrews Trophy (representing the Continent of Europe): 1982 (winners)

Professional

- World Cup (representing Denmark): 1987, 1988, 1989, 1990, 1991, 1992, 1993 (withdrew), 1995
- Dunhill Cup (representing Denmark): 1988
