= 1990 Volvo PGA Championship =

Tournament information
- Dates: 25–28 May 1990
- Location: Virginia Water, Surrey, England; 51.40°N 0.59°W
- Courses: Wentworth Club (West Course)
- Tour: European Tour

Statistics
- Par: 72
- Field: 144 players, 71 after cut
- Cut: 145 (+1)
- Prize fund: £400,000
- Winner's share: £93,324

Champion
- (Australia) Mike Harwood
- 271 (−17)

Location map
- Location in England Location in Surrey

The 1990 Volvo PGA Championship was the 36th edition of the Volvo PGA Championship, an annual professional golf tournament on the European Tour. It was held 25–28 May at the West Course of Wentworth Club in Virginia Water, Surrey, England, a suburb southwest of London.

It was the first year in which the event was granted "flagship event" status of the European Tour by the Official World Golf Ranking.

The event was won by Mike Harwood, beating John Bland and Nick Faldo by one shot. It was his first Volvo PGA Championship win.

== Round summaries ==
=== First round ===
Friday, 25 May 1990

Place	Player	Score	To par
T1	(England) Paul Curry	66	−6
T1	(Zimbabwe) Tony Johnstone	66	−6
T1	(Spain) José María Olazábal	66	−6
T1	(Argentina) Eduardo Romero	66	−6
T5	(South Africa) John Bland	67	−5
T5	(England) Richard Boxall	67	−5
T5	(England) Nick Faldo	67	−5
T8	(Australia) Rodger Davis	68	−4
T8	(France) Marc Farry	68	−4
T8	(Northern Ireland) Jimmy Heggarty	68	−4
T8	(England) Barry Lane	68	−4
T8	(Spain) Manuel Moreno	68	−4
T8	(Australia) Craig Parry	68	−4
T8	(Sweden) Johan Ryström	68	−4

=== Second round ===
Saturday, 26 May 1990

Place	Player	Score	To par
T1	(South Africa) John Bland	67-67=134	−10
T1	(Spain) José María Olazábal	66-68=134	−10
T3	(England) Paul Curry	66-70=136	−8
T3	(Australia) Rodger Davis	68-68=136	−8
T5	(Australia) Mike Harwood	69-68=137	−7
T5	(Australia) Craig Parry	68-69=137	−7
T5	(Argentina) Eduardo Romero	66-71=137	−7
T5	(Republic of Ireland) Philip Walton	70-67=137	−7
T9	(England) Nick Faldo	67-71=138	−6
T9	(Argentina) Vicente Fernández	69-69=138	−6
T9	(Northern Ireland) Jimmy Heggarty	68-70=138	−6
T9	(Zimbabwe) Tony Johnstone	66-72=138	−6

=== Third round ===
Sunday, 27 May 1990

Place	Player	Score	To par
1	(Spain) José María Olazábal	66-68-69=203	−13
2	(Australia) Mike Harwood	69-68-67=204	−12
T3	(South Africa) John Bland	67-67-71=205	−11
T3	(Zimbabwe) Tony Johnstone	66-72-67=205	−11
T5	(Spain) José Rivero	72-67-67=206	−10
T5	(Argentina) Eduardo Romero	66-71-69=206	−10
T7	(Australia) Rodger Davis	68-68-71=207	−9
T7	(England) Nick Faldo	67-71-69=207	−9
T9	(England) Paul Curry	66-70-72=208	−8
T9	(Scotland) Colin Montgomerie	70-70-68=208	−8
T9	(Republic of Ireland) Philip Walton	70-67-71=208	−8

=== Final round ===
Monday, 28 May 1990

Place	Player	Score	To par
1	(Australia) Mike Harwood	69-68-67-67=271	−17
T2	(South Africa) John Bland	67-67-71-67=272	−16
T2	(England) Nick Faldo	67-71-69-65=272	−16
T4	(Australia) Rodger Davis	68-68-71-66=273	−15
T4	(Spain) José María Olazábal	66-68-69-70=273	−15
6	(Argentina) Eduardo Romero	66-71-69-68=274	−14
T7	(England) Paul Curry	66-70-72-68=276	−12
T7	(Zimbabwe) Tony Johnstone	66-72-67-71=276	−12
9	(Scotland) Colin Montgomerie	70-70-68-69=277	−11
T10	(France) Marc Farry	68-71-71-68=278	−10
T10	(South Africa) Jeff Hawkes	70-69-72-67=278	−10
T10	(Republic of Ireland) Philip Walton	70-67-71-70=278	−10
T10	(England) David Williams	70-70-70-68=278	−10
