= Mark Mouland =

Welsh golfer (born 1961)

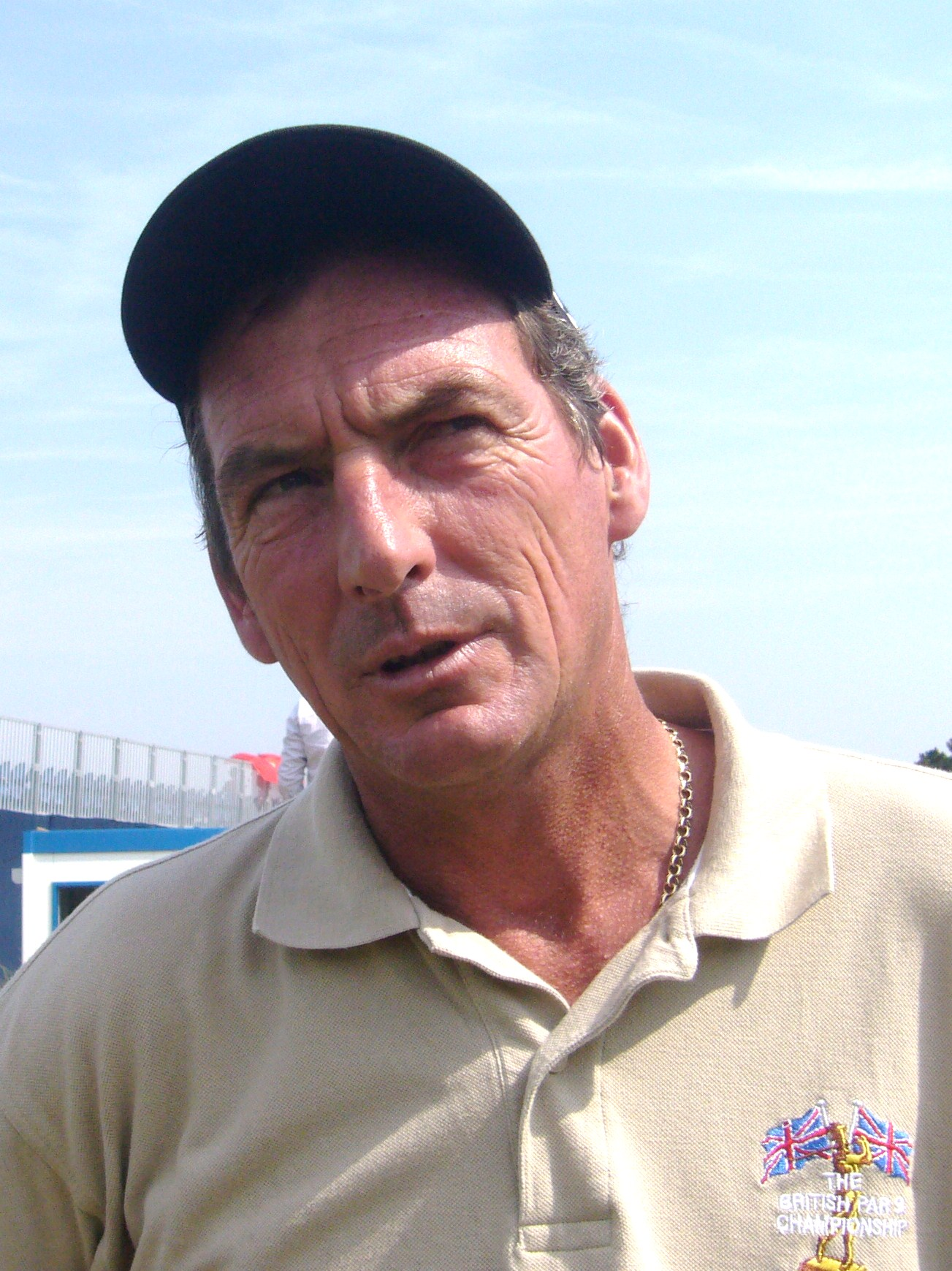

Personal information
- Full name: Mark Mouland
- Nationality: Wales
- Born: 23 April 1961 (age 65) St Athan, Wales
- Height: 6 ft 0 in (1.83 m)
- Weight: 168 lb (76 kg; 12.0 st)
- Spouse: Marianne Mouland
- Children: Stephanie, Kimberley

Career
- Sport: Golf
- Turned professional: 1981
- Current tours: European Senior Tour; Champions Tour
- Former tour: European Tour
- Professional wins: 8
- Highest ranking: 82 (24 July 1988)

Number of wins by tour
- European Tour: 2
- European Senior Tour: 1
- Other: 5

Best results in major championships
- Masters Tournament: DNP
- PGA Championship: DNP
- U.S. Open: DNP
- The Open Championship: T17: 1991

Mark Mouland (born 23 April 1961) is a Welsh professional golfer.

== Career ==
In 1961, Mouland was born in St. Athan in the Vale of Glamorgan and is the son of six times Welsh champion Sid Mouland. In 1976, he became the youngest ever winner of the British Boys Championship.

In 1981, Mouland turned professional. By 1986, Mouland was well established on the European Tour, winning that year's Car Care Plan International and finishing 30th on the Order of Merit. He broke his right ankle and left foot in a car crash later that year, but recovered to record the only two top-20 Order of Merit finishes of his career in 1987 (16th) and 1988 (18th). The 1988 KLM Dutch Open was his second and last win on the European Tour. He maintained steady form for many years, last finishing in the top hundred on the Order of Merit in 2001.

Mouland continued to compete into his mid forties, but mainly on the second tier Challenge Tour. He also won the Mauritius Open in 2002 and 2003.

Mouland began playing on the European Senior Tour after turning 50 in April 2011. He won his first title at the Belas Clube de Campo Senior Open de Portugal in October 2011. He will play on the Champions Tour in 2013 after finishing 3rd at Qualifying school in November 2012.

== Amateur wins ==
- 1976 Boys Amateur Championship

== Professional wins (8) ==
=== European Tour wins (2) ===
No.	Date	Tournament	Winning score	Margin of victory	Runner-up
1	12 Jul 1986	Car Care Plan International	−4 (72-71-65-64=272)	1 stroke	(Sweden) Anders Forsbrand
2	24 Jul 1988	KLM Dutch Open	−14 (72-68-69-65=274)	1 stroke	(Republic of Ireland) Des Smyth

European Tour playoff record (0–2)

No.	Year	Tournament	Opponent(s)	Result
1	1988	Torras Hostench Barcelona Open	(England) Nick Faldo, (England) Barry Lane, (England) David Whelan	Whelan won with par on fourth extra hole Faldo and Mouland eliminated by birdie on first hole
2	1990	Tenerife Open	(Argentina) Vicente Fernández	Lost to par on third extra hole

=== Other wins (5) ===
- 2002 Mauritius Open
- 2003 Mauritius Open
- 2008 Farmfoods British Par 3 Championship
- 2014 World par 3 Champion, Bermuda
- 2016 Farmfoods British Par 3 Championship

=== European Senior Tour wins (1) ===
No.	Date	Tournament	Winning score	Margin of victory	Runner-up
1	1 Oct 2011	Belas Clube de Campo Senior Open de Portugal	−9 (70-69-68=207)	1 stroke	(United States) Mike Cunning

== Playoff record ==
Challenge Tour playoff record (0–1)

No.	Year	Tournament	Opponents	Result
1	2003	Open de Toulouse	(France) Alexandre Balicki, (Scotland) Scott Drummond	Drummond won with birdie on first extra hole

== Results in major championships ==
Tournament	1983	1984	1985	1986	1987	1988	1989	1990	1991	1992	1993	1994
The Open Championship	CUT		T47	CUT		CUT	CUT	CUT	T17	CUT		CUT

Note: Mouland only played in The Open Championship.

Did not play

CUT = missed the half-way cut
"T" = tied

== Team appearances ==
Amateur

- Jacques Léglise Trophy (representing Great Britain & Ireland): 1977, 1978
- European Amateur Team Championship (representing Wales): 1979

Professional

- Alfred Dunhill Cup (representing Wales): 1986, 1988, 1989, 1990, 1993, 1995, 1996
- Kirin Cup (representing Europe): 1988
- World Cup (representing Wales): 1988, 1989, 1990, 1992, 1993, 1995, 1996, 2001
