= Steen Tinning =

Danish professional golfer (born 1962)

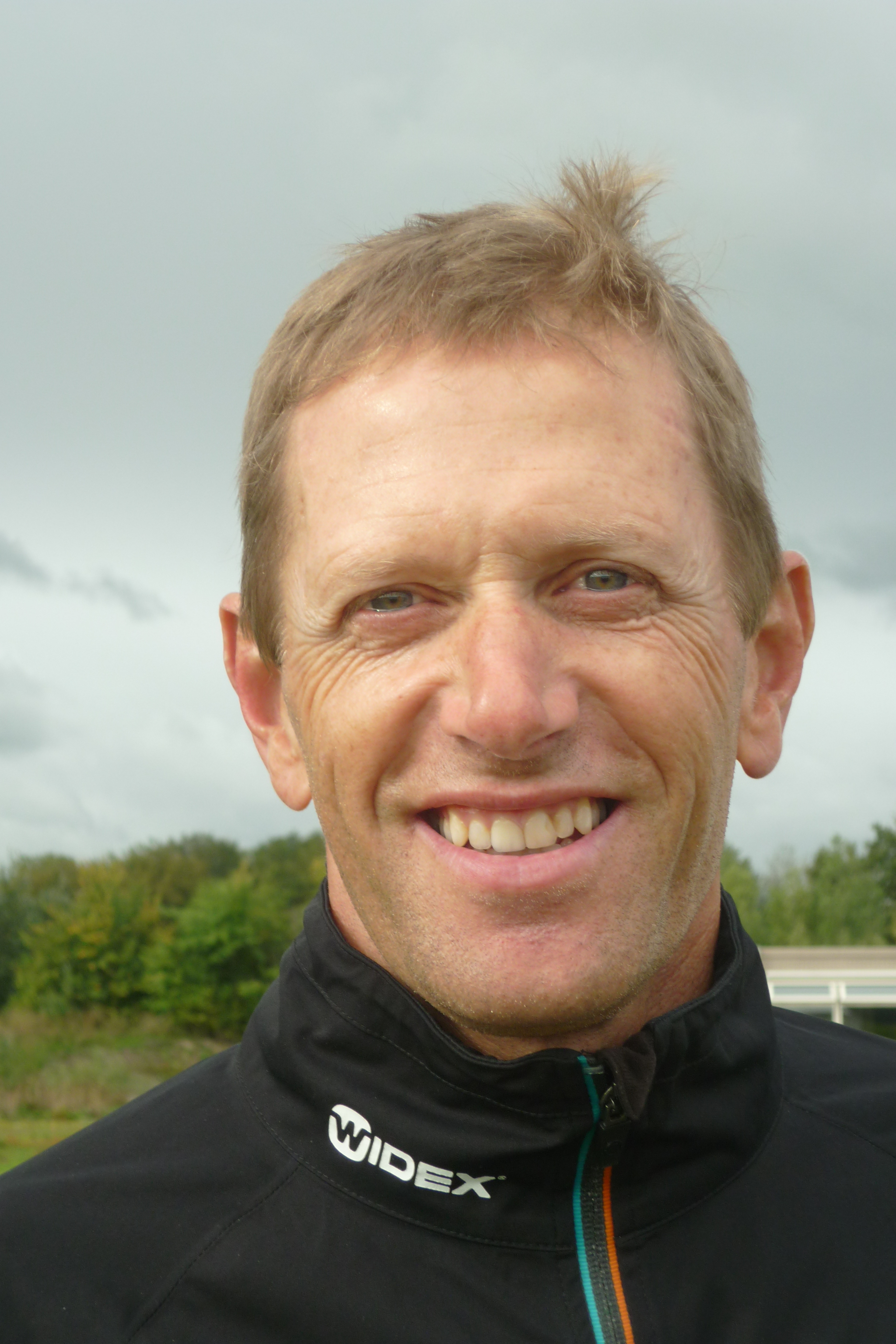

Personal information
- Full name: Steen Tinning
- Nationality: Denmark
- Born: 7 October 1962 (age 64) Copenhagen, Denmark
- Height: 1.85 m (6 ft 1 in)
- Weight: 74 kg (163 lb; 11.7 st)

Career
- Sport: Golf
- Turned professional: 1985
- Current tour: European Senior Tour
- Former tours: European Tour; Champions Tour
- Professional wins: 5

Number of wins by tour
- European Tour: 2
- European Senior Tour: 2
- Other: 1

Best results in major championships
- Masters Tournament: DNP
- PGA Championship: DNP
- U.S. Open: DNP
- The Open Championship: T38: 1998

Achievements and awards
- European Senior Tour Rookie of the Year: 2013

Steen Tinning (born 7 October 1962) is a Danish professional golfer who formerly played on the European Tour and plays on the European Senior Tour.

== Career ==
Tinning was born in Copenhagen. After a successful amateur career he turned professional in 1985 and soon won a place on the European Tour. This career was interrupted when he and his wife were involved in a multiple car crash in Germany in 1990, which badly damaged his right arm. He recovered and went on to win two European Tour events, the 2000 Celtic Manor Resort Wales Open and the 2002 Telefonica Open de Madrid. His last season on the European Tour was 2003, and his best year-end ranking on the Order of Merit was 30th in 2000. He represented his country in international team competitions several times.

In 2013 Tinning won twice on the European Senior Tour, his rookie season on that tour. In August he captured his maiden victory at the Berenberg Masters. In October he won the English Senior Open.

== Amateur wins ==
- 1983 Danish Amateur Close Championship
- 1984 Scandinavian Open Amateur Championship

== Professional wins (5) ==
=== European Tour wins (2) ===
No.	Date	Tournament	Winning score	Margin of victory	Runner(s)-up
1	11 Jun 2000	Celtic Manor Resort Wales Open	−15 (70-68-66-69=273)	1 stroke	(England) David Howell
2	27 Oct 2002	Telefónica Open de Madrid	−19 (68-68-62-67=265)	1 stroke	(Scotland) Andrew Coltart, (England) Brian Davis, (Australia) Adam Scott

=== Nordic Golf League wins (1) ===
No.	Date	Tournament	Winning score	Margin of victory	Runner-up
1	8 Jun 2012	Samsø Classic	−15 (64-68-69=201)	5 strokes	(Denmark) Jeff Winther

=== European Senior Tour wins (2) ===
No.	Date	Tournament	Winning score	Margin of victory	Runner-up
1	4 Aug 2013	Berenberg Masters	−9 (68-70-69=207)	1 stroke	(Germany) Bernhard Langer
2	6 Oct 2013	English Senior Open	−17 (69-63-67=199)	1 stroke	(Spain) Santiago Luna

== Results in major championships ==
Tournament	1988	1989
The Open Championship	CUT	CUT

Tournament	1990	1991	1992	1993	1994	1995	1996	1997	1998	1999
The Open Championship					CUT		CUT		T38	

Tournament	2000	2001	2002	2003
The Open Championship	CUT			CUT

Note: Tinning only played in The Open Championship.

Did not play

CUT = missed the half-way cut
"T" = tied

== Results in World Golf Championships ==
Tournament	2003
Match Play	
Championship	
Invitational	T71

Did not play

"T" = Tied

== Team appearances ==
Amateur

- European Youths' Team Championship (representing Denmark): 1978, 1979, 1981
- Jacques Léglise Trophy (representing the Continent of Europe): 1978 (winners), 1979, 1980
- Eisenhower Trophy (representing Denmark): 1982, 1984
- European Amateur Team Championship (representing Denmark): 1983

Professional

- World Cup (representing Denmark): 1987, 1988, 1989, 1990, 1993, 1994, 1995
- Dunhill Cup (representing Denmark): 1988
