= Marc Pendariès =

French professional golfer (born 1966)

Personal information
- Nationality: France
- Born: 26 June 1966 (age 60) Paris, France
- Height: 6 ft 0 in (1.83 m)

Career
- Sport: Golf
- College: University of Houston
- Turned professional: 1987
- Former tours: European Tour; Challenge Tour
- Professional wins: 3

Number of wins by tour
- Challenge Tour: 1
- Other: 2

Marc Pendariès (born 26 June 1966) is a French professional golfer who is a former member of the European Tour.

== Career ==
Pendariès had an impressive amateur career which included winning the French Junior National Championship three times, the Orange Bowl (Junior World Championship), and the 1985 NCAA Division I Men's Golf Championship with the Houston Cougars men's golf team. He was runner-up at the 1983 Boys Amateur Championship at Glenbervie Golf Club, Scotland, losing the final to José María Olazábal. He represented France at the 1982 Eisenhower Trophy and at the European Amateur Team Championship in 1983, 1985 and 1987.

In 1987 he won the Swedish International Stroke Play Championship at Ullna Golf Club, one stroke ahead of Luis Carbonetti of Argentina.

Pendariès turned professional in late 1987 after successfully progressing through the Qualifying School, and joined the European Tour. Three top-15 finishes on the 1988 European Tour helped him retain his card. Although he lost it a year later he made another successful visit to the Qualifying School in 1990 but once again finished outside the exempt places the following season.

He represented France at the 1988 World Cup and the 1989 Dunhill Cup.

After playing on the European Tour 1988–1991, Pendariès played mainly on the Challenge Tour 1992–2003. He claimed one victory at the 1998 Modena Classic, and came close to graduating via the rankings on a number of occasions. He recorded no less than eight runner-up finishes; in 1992 at the Pro 2000 - Challenge Chargeurs and again at Pro Am Moet & Chandon du Leman, in 1993 at Open de Vittel losing a playoff to compatriot Jean-Louis Guépy, in 1997 at Le Pavoniere Supercal Challenge in Italy, and then at the 1998 BTC Slovenian Open and the 1999 Open de Cote d'Ivoire, behind Ian Poulter. In 2001 at Open des Volcans on home soil and the Montecchia Open in Italy.

Earning the 25th card in Q-School at Emporda Golf Club, Pendariès made it back on the European Tour again in 2004, where his best finish was T15 at the Omega Hong Kong Open. He retired from tour at the end of 2004.

== Professional wins (3) ==
=== Challenge Tour wins (1) ===
| No. | Date | Tournament | Winning score | Margin of victory | Runner-up |
|---|---|---|---|---|---|
| 1 | 24 May 1998 | Modena Classic Open | −18 (64-66-69-71=270) | 1 stroke | (Finland) Pauli Hughes |

=== Swedish Golf Tour wins (1) ===
| No. | Date | Tournament | Winning score | Margin of victory | Runner-up |
|---|---|---|---|---|---|
| 1 | 5 Jul 1987 | SI Trygg-Hansa Open (as an amateur) | −2 (74-71-67-74=286) | 1 stroke | (Argentina) Luis Carbonetti |

=== Other wins (1) ===
- 1993 French PGA Championship

== Team appearances ==
Amateur

- Jacques Léglise Trophy (representing the Continent of Europe): 1980, 1982, 1983
- Eisenhower Trophy (representing France): 1982
- European Amateur Team Championship (representing France): 1983, 1985, 1987

Professional

- Alfred Dunhill Cup (representing France): 1989
- World Cup (representing France): 1988
