= Massimo Mannelli =

Italian professional golfer

Personal information
- Full name: Massimo Mannelli
- Nationality: Italy
- Born: 9 April 1956 (age 70)
- Height: 1.85 m (6 ft 1 in)

Career
- Sport: Golf
- Status: Professional
- Former tour: European Tour
- Professional wins: 6

Number of wins by tour
- European Tour: 1
- Other: 5

Best results in major championships
- Masters Tournament: DNP
- PGA Championship: DNP
- U.S. Open: DNP
- The Open Championship: CUT: 1981, 1983, 1985

Massimo Mannelli (born 9 April 1956) is an Italian professional golfer.

== Career ==
He played regularly on the European Tour from the late 1970s to the early 1990s and finished a career high 40th on the European Tour Order of Merit in 1980, the year in which he won his home national open, the Italian Open. That was to be his only European Tour win. He was the last Italian golfer to win the event until Francesco Molinari did so in 2006.

== Amateur wins ==
- 1974 Italian Amateur Championship

== Professional wins (6) ==
=== European Tour wins (1) ===
No.	Date	Tournament	Winning score	Margin of victory	Runners-up
1	20 Apr 1980	Italian Open	−8 (68-66-70-72=276)	5 strokes	(South Africa) John Bland, (Scotland) Ken Brown

=== Other wins (5) ===
This list may be incomplete

- 1981 National Omnium
- 1986 National Omnium
- 1986 Italian National Professional Championship
- 1990 Italian PGA Championship, Italian National Professional Championship

== Results in major championships ==
Tournament	1981	1982	1983	1984	1985
The Open Championship	CUT		CUT		CUT

Note: Mannelli only played in The Open Championship.

Did not play

CUT = missed the half-way cut (3rd round cut in 1981, 1983 and 1985 Open Championships)

== Team appearances ==
Amateur

- Eisenhower Trophy (representing Italy): 1974, 1976
- European Youths' Team Championship (representing Italy): 1975 (winners), 1976, 1977

Professional

- World Cup (representing Italy): 1983, 1989
- Hennessy Cognac Cup (representing the Continent of Europe): 1980, (representing Italy) 1984
- Alfred Dunhill Cup (representing Italy): 1989
