= Yoshinori Kaneko =

Japanese golfer

Personal information
- Nationality: Japan
- Born: 4 March 1961 (age 65) Tokyo, Japan
- Height: 1.73 m (5 ft 8 in)
- Weight: 76 kg (168 lb; 12.0 st)

Career
- Sport: Golf
- Turned professional: 1983
- Former tour: Japan Golf Tour
- Professional wins: 7
- Highest ranking: 62 (2 March 1997)

Number of wins by tour
- Japan Golf Tour: 6
- Other: 1

Best results in major championships
- Masters Tournament: CUT: 1997
- PGA Championship: T71: 1997
- U.S. Open: DNP
- The Open Championship: CUT: 1996

Yoshinori Kaneko (金子 柱憲, Kaneko Yoshinori; born 4 March 1961) is a Japanese professional golfer.

== Career ==
Kaneko played on the Japan Golf Tour, winning six times.

== Professional wins (7) ==
=== Japan Golf Tour wins (6) ===
No.	Date	Tournament	Winning score	Margin of victory	Runner(s)-up
1	8 Sep 1991	Kanto Open	−14 (69-69-64=202)	5 strokes	(Japan) Eiichi Itai
2	5 Apr 1992	Descente Classic	−9 (66-70-71-72=279)	2 strokes	(Japan) Masanobu Kimura
3	10 Mar 1996	Token Corporation Cup	−13 (69-74-67-65=275)	1 stroke	(United States) Brandt Jobe
4	21 Apr 1996	Kirin Open^{1}	−10 (68-71-69-70=278)	1 stroke	(Japan) Tsuneyuki Nakajima, (Japan) Nobuo Serizawa
5	23 Jun 1996	Mizuno Open	−18 (66-71-65-68=270)	4 strokes	(Japan) Shinichi Yokota
6	28 Mar 1999	Georgia KSB Open	−13 (65-67-71-72=275)	1 stroke	(Philippines) Frankie Miñoza

^{1}Co-sanctioned by the Asia Golf Circuit

Japan Golf Tour playoff record (0–1)

No.	Year	Tournament	Opponents	Result
1	1994	Mizuno Open	(Colombia) Eduardo Herrera, (Japan) Koichi Suzuki, (United States) Brian Watts	Watts won with birdie on first extra hole

=== Japan Challenge Tour wins (1) ===
- 1988 Kanto Kokusai Open

== Team appearances ==
- Dunhill Cup (representing Japan): 1990
- Four Tours World Championship (representing Japan): 1991
