= El Bosque Open =

Tournament information
- Location: Valencia, Spain
- Established: 1990
- Courses: El Bosque Golf & Country Club
- Par: 72
- Tour: European Tour
- Format: Stroke play
- Prize fund: £200,000
- Month played: April
- Final year: 1990

Tournament record score
- Aggregate: 278 Vijay Singh (1990)
- To par: −10 as above

Final champion
- (Fiji) Vijay Singh
- Location in Spain Location in the Valencian Community

The El Bosque Open was a professional golf tournament on the European Tour. It was held just once, in 1990, when it replaced the Jersey Open on the tour schedule. Its renewal in 1991 was cancelled due to lack of sponsorship.

The tournament was played on the Robert Trent Jones designed course at El Bosque Golf & Country Club, Valencia, Spain from 5–8 April and was won by Vijay Singh of Fiji, who later become the World's Number 1 golfer. It was Singh's second title on the European Tour and he shot a ten under par of 278 to win by two strokes from the Englishmen Richard Boxall and Chris Williams.

== Winners ==
Year	Winner	Score	To par	Margin of victory	Runners-up
1991	Cancelled				
1990	(Fiji) Vijay Singh	278	−10	2 strokes	(England) Richard Boxall (South Africa) Chris Williams
