= Philip Parkin =

Welsh professional golfer

Personal information
- Full name: Andrew Philip Parkin
- Nationality: Wales
- Born: 12 December 1961 (age 64) Doncaster, England
- Height: 6 ft 0 in (1.83 m)

Career
- Sport: Golf
- College: Texas A&M University
- Turned professional: 1984
- Former tours: European Tour; PGA Tour
- Professional wins: 1

Best results in major championships
- Masters Tournament: CUT: 1984
- PGA Championship: DNP
- U.S. Open: DNP
- The Open Championship: T21: 1986

Achievements and awards
- Sir Henry Cotton Rookie of the Year: 1984

Andrew Philip Parkin (born 12 December 1961) is a Welsh professional golfer who has also worked as a golf commentator and analyst.

== Early life and amateur career ==
Parkin was born in Doncaster, England, and raised in Newtown, Powys. He attended Texas A&M University in the United States, where he was the first person to receive a full scholarship for the university's golf team. He went on to become the first Aggie and first European to become 1st Team All-American. In 1983, he won The Amateur Championship to add to the British Youths Open Amateur Championship won the previous year, becoming the only player to hold both trophies at the same time. He appeared in the Walker Cup later that year, and turned professional after playing in the U.S. Masters in 1984.

== Professional career ==
Parkin was named the Sir Henry Cotton Rookie of the Year in his début season on the European Tour in 1984, having finished in 65th place on the Order of Merit despite only joining the tour in July. He earned enough money in his first event as a professional, during the 1984 Open Championship at St Andrews, to become the quickest affiliate member in the history of the European Tour. He ended the 1985 and 1986 seasons inside the top 35, even though he played less than 20 tournaments, both seasons, before he moved to the United States to play on the PGA Tour. He finished tied for 3rd at the PGA Tour Qualifying Tournament to earn his card for 1987. In his rookie season, he finished outside the top 200 on the money list to lose his playing rights, but did also play 14 events on the European Tour and retained his European Tour card. He returned to Europe with more success, twice making the top 100 on the European Tour Order of Merit. His form faded as he was troubled by an eye problem, which ended his playing career at the age of 31.

Parkin represented Wales 47 times on international teams including two World Cups, in 1984 and 1989 placing 4th and 5th respectively, and five Alfred Dunhill Cups, reaching two semi-finals. Since leaving the tour, Parkin has worked as a golf coach and as a commentator and analyst for many different broadcasters.

== Amateur wins ==
- 1982 British Youths Open Amateur Championship, Tillman Trophy
- 1983 The Amateur Championship

== Professional wins (1) ==
- 1986 Welsh Professional Championship

== Results in major championships ==
Tournament	1983	1984	1985	1986	1987	1988	1989
Masters Tournament		CUT					
The Open Championship	CUT	T31	T25	T21	CUT		CUT

Note: Parkin never played in the U.S. Open or the PGA Championship.

Did not play

CUT = missed the half-way cut
"T" = tied

== Team appearances ==
Amateur

- Walker Cup (representing Great Britain & Ireland): 1983
- European Amateur Team Championship (representing Wales): 1983
- St Andrews Trophy (representing Great Britain & Ireland): 1984 (winners)

Professional

- World Cup (representing Wales): 1984, 1989
- Hennessy Cognac Cup (representing Wales): 1984
- Dunhill Cup (representing Wales): 1985, 1986, 1989, 1990, 1991

== See also ==
- 1986 PGA Tour Qualifying School graduates
