= Stephen McAllister =

Scottish golfer

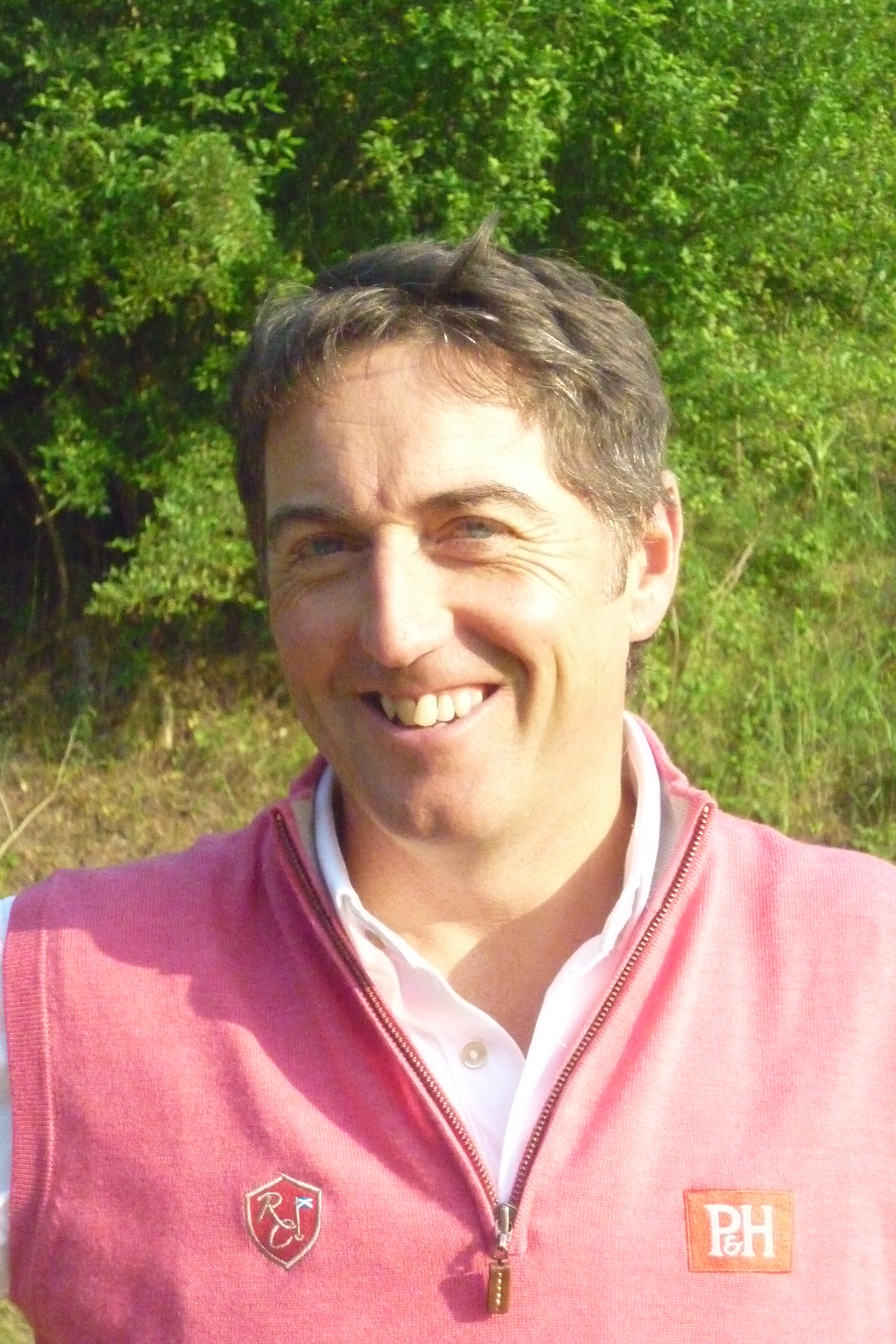

Personal information
- Nationality: Scotland
- Born: 16 February 1962 (age 64) Paisley, Scotland
- Height: 5 ft 8 in (1.73 m)

Career
- Sport: Golf
- Turned professional: 1983
- Former tour: European Tour
- Professional wins: 4

Number of wins by tour
- European Tour: 2

Best results in major championships
- Masters Tournament: DNP
- PGA Championship: DNP
- U.S. Open: DNP
- The Open Championship: 107th: 1991

Stephen McAllister (born 16 February 1962) is a Scottish professional golfer.

== Career ==
In 1962, McAllister was born in Paisley. He won the Lytham Trophy in 1983 and turned professional later that year.

McAllister first played on the European Tour in 1987. His career year was 1990, when he won his only two European Tour titles, the Atlantic Open and the KLM Dutch Open, and finished nineteenth on the European Tour Order of Merit.

McAllister also won two non-tour professional tournaments, the 1987 Scottish Masters and the 1988 Toyota Cup. His tour career came to an end in 2000 and he later worked as a golf coach and corporate golf manager.

== Amateur wins ==
- 1983 Lytham Trophy

== Professional wins (4) ==
=== European Tour wins (2) ===
No.	Date	Tournament	Winning score	Margin of victory	Runner(s)-up
1	18 Feb 1990	Vinho Verde Atlantic Open	E (71-71-72-74=288)	Playoff	(England) Richard Boxall, (Northern Ireland) Stephen Hamill, (Northern Ireland) Ronan Rafferty, (Denmark) Anders Sørensen, (England) David Williams
2	29 Jul 1990	KLM Dutch Open	−6 (69-67-68-70=274)	4 strokes	(England) Roger Chapman

European Tour playoff record (1–0)

No.	Year	Tournament	Opponents	Result
1	1990	Vinho Verde Atlantic Open	(England) Richard Boxall, (Northern Ireland) Stephen Hamill, (Northern Ireland) Ronan Rafferty, (Denmark) Anders Sørensen, (England) David Williams	Won with par on first extra hole

=== Other wins (2) ===
- 1987 Sunderland Sportswear Masters
- 1988 Toyota Cup (Denmark)

== Results in major championships ==
Tournament	1987	1988	1989	1990	1991
The Open Championship	CUT				107

Note: McAllister only played in The Open Championship.

Did not play

CUT = missed the half-way cut

== Team appearances ==
Amateur

- European Amateur Team Championship (representing Scotland): 1983

Professional

- Dunhill Cup (representing Scotland): 1990
