= 1988 Dunhill Cup =

Coordinates: 56.351484°N 2.816147°W

Tournament information
- Dates: 13–16 October
- Location: St Andrews, Scotland
- Course: Old Course at St Andrews
- Format: Match play

Statistics
- Par: 72
- Length: 6,933 yards (6,340 m)
- Field: 16 teams of 3 players
- Prize fund: US$1,000,000
- Winner's share: US$300,000

Champion
- Ireland (Eamonn Darcy, Ronan Rafferty, Des Smyth)

The 1988 Dunhill Cup was the fourth Dunhill Cup. It was a team tournament featuring 16 countries, each represented by three players. The Cup was played 13–16 October at the Old Course at St Andrews in Scotland. The sponsor was the Alfred Dunhill company. The Irish team of Eamonn Darcy, Ronan Rafferty, and Des Smyth beat the Australian team of Rodger Davis, David Graham, and Greg Norman in the final. (As in the World Cup, Ireland was represented by a combined Ireland and Northern Ireland team.)

== Format ==
The Cup was played as a single-elimination, match play event played over four days. The top eight teams were seeded with the remaining teams randomly placed in the bracket. In each match, the three players were paired with their opponents and played 18 holes at medal match play. Tied matches were extended to a sudden-death playoff only if they affected the outcome between the two teams.

== Bracket ==
First round
1	United States	3
Philippines	0
8	Ireland	2
Canada	1
5	England	3
France	0
4	Scotland	3
Thailand	0
2	Spain	3
Zimbabwe	0
7	Japan	3
Denmark	0
6	Wales	3
Sweden	0
3	Australia	3
Brazil	0

Quarter-finals
1	United States	0.5
8	Ireland	2.5
5	England	2
4	Scotland	1
2	Spain	3
7	Japan	0
6	Wales	1
3	Australia	2

Semi-finals
8	Ireland	2
5	England	1
2	Spain	1
3	Australia	2

Final
8	Ireland	2
3	Australia	1
Third place
5	England	1
2	Spain	2

== Round by round scores ==
=== First round ===
United States – 3		Philippines – 0	
Player	Score	Player	Score
Curtis Strange	70	Eddie Bagtas	75
Chip Beck	68	Rudy Lavares	81
Mark McCumber	72	Frankie Miñoza	75

Ireland – 2		Canada – 1	
Player	Score	Player	Score
Ronan Rafferty	69	Dave Barr	67
Eamonn Darcy	69	Dan Halldorson	72
Des Smyth	69	Richard Zokol	76

Spain – 3		Zimbabwe – 0	
Player	Score	Player	Score
Seve Ballesteros	72	Tim Price	74
José Rivero	68	Anthony Edwards	72
José María Olazábal	74	Morgan Shumba	78

Australia – 3		Brazil – 0	
Player	Score	Player	Score
Rodger Davis	69	Rafael Navarro	74
David Graham	68	Carlos Dluosh	72
Greg Norman	74	Priscillo Diniz	78

England – 3		France – 0	
Player	Score	Player	Score
Mark James	66	Frédéric Regard	75
Barry Lane	70	Michel Tapia	75
Nick Faldo	65	Emmanuel Dussart	70

Scotland – 3		Thailand – 0	
Player	Score	Player	Score
Gordon Brand Jnr	74	Boonchu Ruangkit	76
Colin Montgomerie	72	Suthep Meesawat	80
Sandy Lyle	70	Somsakdi Srisangar	73

Japan – 3		Denmark – 0	
Player	Score	Player	Score
Naomichi Ozaki	69	Jacob Rasmussen	77
Tateo Ozaki	68	Steen Tinning	69
Hajime Meshiai	72	Anders Sørensen	75

Wales – 3		Sweden – 0	
Player	Score	Player	Score
David Llewellyn	72	Magnus Persson	75
Mark Mouland	70	Ove Sellberg	71
Ian Woosnam	69	Anders Forsbrand	75

=== Quarter-finals ===
United States – 0.5		Ireland – 2.5	
Player	Score	Player	Score
Mark McCumber	72	Ronan Rafferty	71
Chip Beck	71	Des Smyth	71
Curtis Strange	68	Eamonn Darcy	66

Australia – 2		Wales – 1	
Player	Score	Player	Score
David Graham	67	Mark Mouland	76
Rodger Davis	69	David Llewellyn	70
Greg Norman	73	Ian Woosnam	71

Spain – 2		Japan – 1	
Player	Score	Player	Score
Seve Ballesteros	72	Naomichi Ozaki	74
José Rivero	65	Hajime Meshiai	68
José María Olazábal	68	Tateo Ozaki	69

Scotland – 1		England – 2	
Player	Score	Player	Score
Gordon Brand Jnr	71	Barry Lane	73
Colin Montgomerie	72	Mark James	69
Sandy Lyle	68	Nick Faldo	67

=== Semi-finals ===
Spain – 1		Australia – 2	
Player	Score	Player	Score
José Rivero	72	Rodger Davis	71
José María Olazábal	69	David Graham	73
Seve Ballesteros	69	Greg Norman	67

England – 1		Ireland – 2	
Player	Score	Player	Score
Barry Lane	65	Ronan Rafferty	68
Nick Faldo		Des Smyth	
Mark James		Eamonn Darcy	

Note the last two semi-final matches were suspended Saturday and concluded Sunday before the final match.

=== Final ===
Australia – 1		Ireland – 2	
Player	Score	Player	Score
Rodger Davis	73	Des Smyth	71
David Graham	74	Ronan Rafferty	69
Greg Norman	63	Eamonn Darcy	71

=== Third place ===
Spain – 2		England – 1	
Player	Score	Player	Score
Seve Ballesteros	71	Barry Lane	72
José María Olazábal	67	Nick Faldo	66
José Rivero	69	Mark James	70

== Team results ==
Country	Place	W	L	Seed
Ireland	1	8.5	3.5	8
Australia	2	8	4	3
Spain	3	9	3	2
England	4	7	5	5
Scotland	T5	4	2	4
Wales	T5	4	2	6
United States	T5	3.5	2.5	1
Japan	T5	3	3	7
Canada	T9	1	2	
Brazil	T9	0	3	
Denmark	T9	0	3	
France	T9	0	3	
Philippines	T9	0	3	
Sweden	T9	0	3	
Thailand	T9	0	3	
Zimbabwe	T9	0	3	

== Player results ==
Country	Player	W	L
Ireland	Des Smyth	3.5	0.5
Ireland	Eamonn Darcy	3	1
Ireland	Ronan Rafferty	2	2
Australia	Rodger Davis	3	1
Australia	Greg Norman	3	1
Australia	David Graham	2	2
Spain	Seve Ballesteros	3	1
Spain	José María Olazábal	3	1
Spain	José Rivero	3	1
England	Nick Faldo	3	1
England	Mark James	2	2
England	Barry Lane	2	2
Scotland	Gordon Brand Jnr	2	0
Scotland	Sandy Lyle	1	1
Scotland	Colin Montgomerie	1	1
Wales	Ian Woosnam	2	0
Wales	David Llewellyn	1	1
Wales	Mark Mouland	1	1
United States	Chip Beck	1.5	0.5
United States	Mark McCumber	1	1
United States	Curtis Strange	1	1
Japan	Hajime Meshiai	1	1
Japan	Naomichi Ozaki	1	1
Japan	Tateo Ozaki	1	1
Canada	Dave Barr	1	0
Canada	Dan Halldorson	0	1
Canada	Richard Zokol	0	1
Brazil	Priscillo Diniz	0	1
Brazil	Carlos Dluosh	0	1
Brazil	Rafael Navarro	0	1
Denmark	Jacob Rasmussen	0	1
Denmark	Anders Sørensen	0	1
Denmark	Steen Tinning	0	1
France	Emmanuel Dussart	0	1
France	Frédéric Regard	0	1
France	Michel Tapia	0	1
Philippines	Eddie Bagtas	0	1
Philippines	Rudy Lavares	0	1
Philippines	Frankie Miñoza	0	1
Sweden	Anders Forsbrand	0	1
Sweden	Magnus Persson	0	1
Sweden	Ove Sellberg	0	1
Thailand	Suthep Meesawat	0	1
Thailand	Boonchu Ruangkit	0	1
Thailand	Somsakdi Srisangar	0	1
Zimbabwe	Anthony Edwards	0	1
Zimbabwe	Tim Price	0	1
Zimbabwe	Morgan Shumba	0	1
