= Ronan Rafferty =

Northern Irish professional golfer (born 1964)

Personal information
- Full name: Ronan Patrick Rafferty
- Nationality: Northern Ireland
- Born: 13 January 1964 (age 62) Newry, County Down, Northern Ireland
- Height: 5 ft 11 in (1.80 m)
- Weight: 189 lb (86 kg; 13.5 st)
- Spouse: Yvonne Rafferty
- Children: 2

Career
- Sport: Golf
- Turned professional: 1981
- Former tours: European Tour; Southern Africa Tour; PGA Tour of Australasia; European Senior Tour
- Professional wins: 14
- Highest ranking: 16 (13 May 1990)

Number of wins by tour
- European Tour: 7
- PGA Tour of Australasia: 5
- Other: 2

Best results in major championships
- Masters Tournament: T14: 1990
- PGA Championship: CUT: 1990
- U.S. Open: 63rd: 1990
- The Open Championship: T9: 1984

Achievements and awards
- European Tour Order of Merit winner: 1989

Ronan Patrick Rafferty (born 13 January 1964) is a Northern Irish professional golfer who formerly played on the European Tour. He won the European Tour Order of Merit in 1989.

== Early life ==
Rafferty was born in Newry, Northern Ireland. He won the Boys Amateur Championship aged 15, qualified for the Open Championship at age 16, and played in the 1981 Walker Cup aged 17. He tied for first place with Peter McEvoy in the 1980 English Open Amateur Stroke Play Championship for the Brabazon Trophy. According to Rafferty, as an amateur he and future pro Philip Walton had the best handicaps in the country.

== Professional career ==
For a period Rafferty was one of the best professional golfers in Europe. Between 1987 and 1993, he won 12 official tournaments around the world: five in Australia and seven in Europe. He led the 1989 European Tour Order of Merit and qualified for the 1989 Ryder Cup team. By the early 1990s, he came close to breaking the then-record for consecutive cuts made on the European Tour. He also spent over 100 weeks ranking inside the top 25 of the Official World Golf Ranking between 1989 and 1993.

Rafferty joined the European Tour in 1982. His first year was solid (if unremarkable) with one top-ten placing and 48th ranking on the Order of Merit. His second season, in 1983, inaugurated an excellent stretch that lasted throughout the 1980s. In eight straight seasons, he finished in the top 30 of the Order of Merit and recorded at least six top-10s per year.

He struggled at coming through down the stretch, however. He recorded an astonishing 62 top-10s before his first European Tour victory. This included a playoff loss to compatriot David Feherty at the 1986 Lancia Italian Open.

He had better luck winning down under, however, recording two wins on the 1987 Australasian Tour. The second victory was at the New Zealand Open, where he defeated defending PGA Championship winner Larry Nelson in a playoff. He was the first European to win New Zealand's national open since the 1920s. He also won the 1988 Australian Match Play Championship, defeating Australian Mike Clayton in the finals.

After knocking on the door for years, Rafferty would finally win in Europe in 1989. He avenged his 1986 playoff loss at the Italian Open with a one-stroke win over Sam Torrance. This would be Rafferty's best season, as he would win an additional two events and record 15 top-10 finishes. At the end of the year, he won the Volvo Masters, the most prestigious win of his career, defeating Nick Faldo by one shot. He would go on to win the European Tour Order of Merit. He would also finish atop the 1989 Ryder Cup standings and play in his only Ryder Cup that year at The Belfry. Although Rafferty did not play well (he lost both team matches he played), he won his singles match against defending Open Championship winner Mark Calcavecchia on the 18th hole for a 1up win. This tight win proved indispensable as the European team struggled on the last day and only barely retained the cup with a 14–14 tie.

1990 was another great season for Rafferty. He won the Coca-Cola Classic, PLM Open and Ebel European Masters Swiss Open, recorded two runner-ups and had 12 top-10s in 30 official tour events. His excellent play earned him a special foreign invitation to play the Masters for the first time. In the spring he reached his career peak of #16 in the Official World Golf Ranking after a tie for 6th at the Belgian Open. He also qualified for the U.S. Open and PGA Championship; he was the first Irish pro to play in the U.S. Open since the 1940s.

The remainder of the early 1990s would see Rafferty play a mixture of some good and more disappointing golf. Although he recorded six official top-10s, including a runner-up finish at the European Pro-Celebrity pro-am, 1991 was a frustrating year. For the first time in five seasons, Rafferty did not win an official international event. He missed a European Tour cut for the first time in years at the Spanish Open. His play at the majors was especially weak. He missed the cut at the Masters, abruptly withdrew from the U.S. Open in the middle of the second round and failed to qualify for the Open Championship for the first time. His withdrawal from the U.S. Open was particularly contentious and he was fined by the European Tour. By the end of the season he was in danger of leaving the top 50 in the world rankings.

The beginning of the 1992 season suddenly saw Rafferty go on perhaps the hottest stretch of his career. He finished no worse than second place in five consecutive worldwide events: a victory at the Daikyo Palm Meadows Cup for his final win in Australia; a tie for second at the European-sanctioned Johnnie Walker Classic in Bangkok, Thailand; a playoff loss to Seve Ballesteros at the Dubai Desert Classic; a runner-up to American legend Tom Watson at the Hong Kong Open; and finally a victory at the Portuguese Open. His world ranking would peak again at #16 after his win in Portugal.

This period also marked the beginning of a slow decline that would persist. In the heart of the season, playing in more challenging European and American events, Rafferty missed the cut in most of the events he played; and, when he made the cut, he usually finished near the bottom.

1993 marked a brief return to form. After recording some high finishes in minor European and South African events in late 1992/early 1993, Rafferty recorded a number of top-10s in the middle of the 1993 European season. This would culminate with a victory at the 1993 Hohe Brucke Austrian Open. Rafferty would finish the season ranked inside the global top 50.

The 1994 season, however, would mark the beginning of the end of his career as a touring professional. His victory in Austria would be his last. He recorded only two top-10s in 26 European events and failed to finish in the top 50 of the Order of Merit for the first time.

Rafferty maintained full-time status for three more years and recorded a spate of top 10s but could come close to matching his 1980s heyday. In 1997 broken bones in his left hand severely affected his play. After the 1997 season, he failed to enter the top 100 of the Order of Merit again. He would retire as a touring professional after the 2003 season, except a few appearances.

After turning 50 in 2014, Rafferty came back to compete on the European Senior Tour. In 41 starts the following five seasons, he had two top ten finishes, but no wins.

== Personal life ==
Rafferty was first married to Clare and had two children. His second wife is Yvonne.

In 1987, while playing on the Australasian Tour during the European Tour offseason, he lived with the family of Australian pro Ian Baker-Finch. During this time, Rafferty became a connoisseur of Australian wine. He remains a noted wine collector.

Rafferty now plays few tournaments, and is involved in broadcasting, where he works as a commentator and analyst, and golf course design. He regularly appeared on Setanta golf's coverage.

== Legacy ==
Rafferty is known for prefiguring the rise of professional golf in Northern Ireland. He and David Feherty were the first Northern Irish golfers to win consistently on the European Tour. Shortly after they retired, golfers like Graeme McDowell, Rory McIlroy and Darren Clarke would go on to greater success, winning major championships.

Rafferty was one of the best European golfers during the 1980s and early 1990s. He won 12 official worldwide tour events between 1987 and 1993. By comparison, Nick Faldo, the best European golfer of that era, won 17 tour events during that timespan. Paul Azinger, the most victorious American golfer during that timespan, won only one more event than Rafferty during these years.

== Amateur wins ==
- 1979 Boys Amateur Championship
- 1980 Brabazon Trophy (tie with Peter McEvoy)

== Professional wins (14) ==
=== European Tour wins (7) ===
Legend
Tour Championships (1)
Other European Tour (6)

No.	Date	Tournament	Winning score	Margin of victory	Runner-up
1	21 May 1989	Lancia Italian Open	−15 (71-69-68-65=273)	1 stroke	(Scotland) Sam Torrance
2	6 Aug 1989	Scandinavian Enterprise Open	−20 (70-69-64-65=268)	2 strokes	(United States) Michael Allen
3	29 Oct 1989	Volvo Masters	−6 (72-69-70-71=282)	1 stroke	(England) Nick Faldo
4	5 Aug 1990	PLM Open	−18 (64-67-70-69=270)	4 strokes	(Fiji) Vijay Singh
5	2 Sep 1990	Ebel European Masters Swiss Open	−21 (70-65-66-66=267)	2 strokes	(South Africa) John Bland
6	22 Mar 1992	Portuguese Open	−15 (67-71-67-68=273)	1 stroke	(Sweden) Anders Forsbrand
7	15 Aug 1993	Hohe Brücke Austrian Open	−14 (65-69-72-68=274)	Playoff	(Denmark) Anders Sørensen

European Tour playoff record (1–4)

No.	Year	Tournament	Opponent(s)	Result
1	1986	Italian Open	(Northern Ireland) David Feherty	Lost to birdie on second extra hole
2	1989	KLM Dutch Open	(England) Roger Chapman, (Spain) José María Olazábal	Olazábal won with double-bogey on ninth extra hole Chapman eliminated by par on first hole
3	1990	Vinho Verde Atlantic Open	(England) Richard Boxall, (Northern Ireland) Stephen Hamill, (Scotland) Stephen McAllister, (Denmark) Anders Sørensen, (England) David Williams	McAllister won with par on first extra hole
4	1992	Dubai Desert Classic	(Spain) Seve Ballesteros	Lost to birdie on second extra hole
5	1993	Hohe Brücke Austrian Open	(Denmark) Anders Sørensen	Won with par on first extra hole

=== PGA Tour of Australasia wins (5) ===
No.	Date	Tournament	Winning score	Margin of victory	Runner(s)-up
1	14 Nov 1987	West End South Australian Open	−8 (72-68-71-69=280)	1 stroke	(Australia) Peter Fowler
2	13 Dec 1987 (1988 season)	Nissan-Mobil New Zealand Open	−9 (72-65-71-71=279)	Playoff	(United States) Larry Nelson
3	7 Feb 1988	Mercedes-Benz Australian Match Play Championship	1 up		(Australia) Mike Clayton
4	21 Jan 1990	Coca-Cola Classic	−10 (72-69-68-69=278)	2 strokes	(United States) Brian Watts
5	19 Jan 1992	Daikyo Palm Meadows Cup	−10 (68-72-73-65=278)	2 strokes	(Australia) Bradley Hughes, (Australia) Brett Ogle

PGA Tour of Australasia playoff record (1–0)

No.	Year	Tournament	Opponent	Result
1	1987	Nissan-Mobil New Zealand Open	(United States) Larry Nelson	Won with par on seventh extra hole

=== South American Golf Circuit wins (1) ===
No.	Date	Tournament	Winning score	Margin of victory	Runner-up
1	28 Nov 1982	Venezuela Open	−8 (66-66-70-70=272)	1 stroke	(United States) Lee Carter

=== Other wins (1) ===
- 1988 Equity & Law Challenge

== Results in major championships ==
Tournament	1980	1981	1982	1983	1984	1985	1986	1987	1988	1989	1990	1991	1992	1993	1994	1995
Masters Tournament											T14	CUT				
U.S. Open											63	WD	CUT			
The Open Championship	CUT			61	T9	T44	T21	CUT	T38	T61	T31		T39		T11	CUT
PGA Championship											CUT					

Top 10
Did not play

CUT = missed the half-way cut
WD = Withdrew
"T" indicates a tie for a place

=== Summary ===
Tournament	Wins	2nd	3rd	Top-5	Top-10	Top-25	Events	Cuts made
Masters Tournament	0	0	0	0	0	1	2	1
U.S. Open	0	0	0	0	0	0	3	1
The Open Championship	0	0	0	0	1	3	12	9
PGA Championship	0	0	0	0	0	0	1	0
Totals	0	0	0	0	1	4	18	11

- Most consecutive cuts made – 5 (1988 Open Championship – 1990 Open Championship)
- Longest streak of top-10s – 1

== Team appearances ==
Amateur

- European Youths' Team Championship (representing Ireland): 1979 (winners), 1980
- Jacques Léglise Trophy (representing Great Britain & Ireland): 1979 (winners)
- European Boys' Team Championship (representing Ireland): 1980
- Eisenhower Trophy (representing Great Britain and Ireland): 1980
- St Andrews Trophy (representing Great Britain and Ireland): 1980 (winners)
- Walker Cup (representing Great Britain and Ireland): 1981
- European Amateur Team Championship (representing Ireland): 1981

Professional

- World Cup (representing Ireland): 1983, 1984, 1987, 1988, 1990, 1991, 1992, 1993
- Hennessy Cognac Cup (representing Ireland): 1984
- Dunhill Cup (representing Ireland): 1986, 1987, 1988 (winners), 1989, 1990 (winners), 1991, 1992, 1993, 1995
- Four Tours World Championship (representing Europe): 1988, 1989, 1990, 1991 (winners)
- Ryder Cup (representing Europe): 1989 (tie, cup retained)
  - Record: 3 matches, 1 point (33% point percentage)
  - All formats (W–L–H): 1–2–0 = 1 pt
    - Singles: 1–0–0 = 1pt
    - Foursomes: 0–2–0 = 0pts
    - Fourballs: 0–0–0 = 0pts

== See also ==
- List of people on the postage stamps of Ireland
