= Atlantic Open =

European golf tournament

Vinho Verde Atlantic Open
Tournament information
- Location: Porto, Portugal
- Established: 1990
- Course: Estela Golf Club
- Par: 72
- Tour: European Tour
- Format: Stroke play
- Prize fund: £200,000
- Month played: February
- Final year: 1990

Tournament record score
- Aggregate: 288 Richard Boxall (1990); 288 Stephen Hamill (1990); 288 Stephen McAllister (1990); 288 Ronan Rafferty (1990); 288 Anders Sørensen (1990); 288 David Williams (1990)
- To par: E as above

Final champion
- (Scotland) Stephen McAllister
- Location in Portugal

The Vinho Verde Atlantic Open was a golf tournament on the European Tour in 1990. It was held at Estela Golf Club in Porto, Portugal.

The tournament was won by Scotland's Stephen McAllister, who defeated Richard Boxall, Stephen Hamill, Ronan Rafferty, Anders Sørensen and David Williams in a six way playoff, the joint largest playoff in European Tour history. McAllister was the only player able to make par at the first playoff hole after all six had finished tied on 288 (level par) after 72 holes.

Its renewal was scheduled in 1991 but cancelled after Estela became the host venue for the Portuguese Open, which was then rescheduled to 21–24 March, the dates originally allocated for the Atlantic Open.

== Winners ==
Year	Winner	Score	To par	Margin of victory	Runners-up	Ref.
1991	Cancelled					
1990	(Scotland) Stephen McAllister	288	E	Playoff	(England) Richard Boxall (Northern Ireland) Stephen Hamill (Northern Ireland) Ronan Rafferty (Denmark) Anders Sørensen (England) David Williams	
