= Modena Classic Open =

Tournament information
- Location: Modena, Italy
- Established: 1996
- Courses: Modena G&CC
- Par: 72
- Tour: Challenge Tour
- Format: Stroke play
- Prize fund: £40,000
- Month played: May
- Final year: 1998

Tournament record score
- Aggregate: 270 Marc Pendariès
- To par: −18 as above

Final champion
- (France) Marc Pendariès

Location map
- Location in Italy

The Modena Classic Open was an annual professional golf tournament held at Modena G&CC, near Modena, Italy.

The tournament became part of the second tier Challenge Tour schedule in 1996, where it remained until 1998.

== Winners ==
Year	Winner	Score	To par	Margin of victory	Runner-up	Ref.
1998	(France) Marc Pendariès	270	−18	1 stroke	(Finland) Pauli Hughes	
1997	(Spain) Jesús María Arruti	271	−17	1 stroke	(Italy) Mario Tadini	
1996	(England) Lee S. James	282	−6	1 stroke	(Australia) Marcus Wheelhouse	
