= 1990 European Tour =

Golf tour season

1990 European Tour season
- Duration: 15 February 1990 – 28 October 1990
- Number of official events: 37 (Note: A further two tournaments were scheduled but were cancelled.)
- Most wins: (Wales) Ian Woosnam (4)
- Order of Merit: (Wales) Ian Woosnam
- Golfer of the Year: (England) Nick Faldo
- Sir Henry Cotton Rookie of the Year: (England) Russell Claydon

The 1990 European Tour, titled as the 1990 Volvo Tour for sponsorship reasons, was the 19th season of the European Tour, the main professional golf tour in Europe since its inaugural season in 1972.

It was the third season of the tour under a title sponsorship agreement with Volvo, that was announced in May 1987.

== Changes for 1990 ==
The season was made up of 37 tournaments counting for the Order of Merit, and seven non-counting "Approved Special Events".

There were several changes from the previous season, with the addition of the Atlantic Open, the Amex Med Open and the Austrian Open; and the promotion of the Murphy's Cup to full Order of Merit status.

Before the official schedule was announced the Tenerife Open was dropped, but later returned in place of the cancelled Catalan Open. In late February the Jersey Open was cancelled and replaced by a new tournament in Spain, the El Bosque Open.

== Schedule ==
The following table lists official events during the 1990 season.

| Date | Tournament | Host country | Purse (£) | Winner (Note: The number in brackets after each winner's name is the number of European Tour events they had won up to and including that tournament. This information is only shown for European Tour members and are inclusive of the three United States-based major championships which were included on the schedule for the first time in 1998, with earlier editions having retrospectively been recognised as official tour wins.) | OWGR points | Notes |
|---|---|---|---|---|---|---|
| 18 Feb | Vinho Verde Atlantic Open | Portugal | 200,000 | (Scotland) Stephen McAllister (1) | 16 | New tournament |
| 25 Feb | Emirates Airlines Desert Classic | UAE | US$450,000 | (Republic of Ireland) Eamonn Darcy (4) | 40 | |
| 4 Mar | Amex Med Open | Spain | 400,000 | (Wales) Ian Woosnam (13) | 30 | New tournament |
| 11 Mar | Open Renault de Baleares | Spain | 275,000 | (Spain) Seve Ballesteros (43) | 30 | |
| ~~18 Mar~~ | Catalan Open | Spain | – | Cancelled | – | |
| 18 Mar | Tenerife Open | Spain | 200,000 | (Argentina) Vicente Fernández (3) | 18 | |
| 25 Mar | Volvo Open di Firenze | Italy | 200,000 | (Argentina) Eduardo Romero (2) | 16 | |
| 1 Apr | AGF Open | France | 200,000 | (Australia) Brett Ogle (1) | 16 | |
| ~~8 Apr~~ | Jersey Open | Jersey | – | Cancelled | – | |
| 8 Apr | El Bosque Open | Spain | 200,000 | (Fiji) Vijay Singh (2) | 16 | New tournament |
| 8 Apr | Masters Tournament | United States | US$1,250,000 | (England) Nick Faldo (20) | 100 | Major championship (Note: Unofficial money event at the time, but retrospectively counted as an official win.) |
| 16 Apr | Credit Lyonnais Cannes Open | France | 300,000 | (Zimbabwe) Mark McNulty (9) | 28 | |
| 22 Apr | Cepsa Madrid Open | Spain | 275,000 | (West Germany) Bernhard Langer (22) | 40 | |
| 29 Apr | Peugeot Spanish Open | Spain | 300,000 | (Australia) Rodger Davis (4) | 44 | |
| 7 May | Benson & Hedges International Open | England | 350,000 | (Spain) José María Olazábal (7) | 48 | |
| 13 May | Peugeot-Trends Belgian Open | Belgium | 250,000 | (Sweden) Ove Sellberg (3) | 26 | |
| 20 May | Lancia Martini Italian Open | Italy | 300,000 | (England) Richard Boxall (1) | 36 | |
| 28 May | Volvo PGA Championship | England | 400,000 | (Australia) Mike Harwood (3) | 64 | Flagship event (Note: Official World Golf Ranking "flagship" event status was granted to the European Tour for the first time in 1990, with the Volvo PGA Championship designated as the tour's flagship event.) |
| 3 Jun | Dunhill British Masters | England | 300,000 | (England) Mark James (13) | 40 | |
| 10 Jun | Scandinavian Enterprise Open | Sweden | 400,000 | (United States) Craig Stadler (n/a) | 30 | |
| 17 Jun | Wang Four Stars | England | 225,000 | (Australia) Rodger Davis (5) | 16 | Pro-Am |
| 17 Jun | U.S. Open | United States | US$1,200,000 | (United States) Hale Irwin (n/a) | 100 | Major championship |
| 24 Jun | Carroll's Irish Open | Ireland | 350,000 | (Spain) José María Olazábal (8) | 40 | |
| 1 Jul | Peugeot Open de France | France | 350,000 | (Republic of Ireland) Philip Walton (1) | 36 | |
| 7 Jul | Torras Monte Carlo Open | France | 350,000 | (Wales) Ian Woosnam (14) | 34 | |
| 14 Jul | Bell's Scottish Open | Scotland | 400,000 | (Wales) Ian Woosnam (15) | 56 | |
| 22 Jul | The Open Championship | Scotland | 500,000 | (England) Nick Faldo (21) | 100 | Major championship |
| 29 Jul | KLM Dutch Open | Netherlands | 350,000 | (Scotland) Stephen McAllister (2) | 32 | |
| 5 Aug | PLM Open | Sweden | 350,000 | (Northern Ireland) Ronan Rafferty (4) | 22 | |
| 12 Aug | Murphy's Cup | England | 250,000 | (Zimbabwe) Tony Johnstone (2) | 16 | |
| 12 Aug | PGA Championship | United States | US$1,350,000 | (Australia) Wayne Grady (2) | 100 | Major championship |
| 19 Aug | NM English Open | England | 400,000 | (England) Mark James (14) | 34 | |
| 26 Aug | Volvo German Open | West Germany | 450,000 | (Zimbabwe) Mark McNulty (10) | 26 | |
| 2 Sep | Ebel European Masters Swiss Open | Switzerland | 450,000 | (Northern Ireland) Ronan Rafferty (5) | 34 | |
| 9 Sep | Panasonic European Open | England | 400,000 | (Australia) Peter Senior (3) | 48 | |
| 16 Sep | Trophée Lancôme | France | 425,000 | (Spain) José María Olazábal (9) | 50 | Limited-field event |
| 23 Sep | BMW International Open | West Germany | 400,000 | (United States) Paul Azinger (n/a) | 44 | |
| 30 Sep | Epson Grand Prix of Europe | Wales | 400,000 | (Wales) Ian Woosnam (16) | 46 | Limited-field event |
| 7 Oct | Mercedes German Masters | Germany | 450,000 | (Scotland) Sam Torrance (13) | 46 | |
| 14 Oct | Austrian Open | Austria | 250,000 | (Germany) Bernhard Langer (23) | 16 | New tournament |
| 21 Oct | Portuguese Open TPC | Portugal | 275,000 | (England) Michael McLean (1) | 20 | |
| 28 Oct | Volvo Masters | Spain | 450,000 | (Australia) Mike Harwood (4) | 44 | Tour Championship |

=== Unofficial events ===
The following events were sanctioned by the European Tour, but did not carry official money, nor were wins official.

| Date | Tournament | Host country | Purse (£) | Winner(s) | OWGR points | Notes |
|---|---|---|---|---|---|---|
| 6 Jul | J. P. McManus Pro-Am | Ireland | n/a | (England) Roger Chapman | n/a | Pro-Am |
| 16 Sep | Motorola Classic | England | 60,000 | (England) Paul Broadhurst | 4 | |
| 23 Sep | Suntory World Match Play Championship | England | 350,000 | (Wales) Ian Woosnam | 48 | Limited-field event |
| 25 Sep | Equity & Law Challenge | England | 120,000 | (Scotland) Brian Marchbank | n/a | |
| 30 Sep | UAP European Under-25 Championship | England | n/a | (England) Peter Baker | n/a | |
| 14 Oct | Dunhill Cup | Scotland | US$1,000,000 | Team Ireland | n/a | Team event |
| 4 Nov | Benson & Hedges Trophy | Spain | 200,000 | (Spain) Tania Abitbol and (Spain) José María Cañizares | n/a | Team event |
| 4 Nov | Asahi Glass Four Tours World Championship | Japan | US$1,150,000 | Team Australasia | n/a | Team event |
| 24 Nov | World Cup | United States | US$1,100,000 | (Germany) Torsten Giedeon and (Germany) Bernhard Langer | n/a | Team event |
| 24 Nov | World Cup Individual Trophy | United States | US$1,100,000 | (United States) Payne Stewart | n/a | |

== Order of Merit ==
The Order of Merit was titled as the Volvo Order of Merit and was based on prize money won during the season, calculated in Pound sterling.

| Position | Player | Prize money (£) |
|---|---|---|
| 1 | (Wales) Ian Woosnam | 574,166 |
| 2 | (Zimbabwe) Mark McNulty | 507,541 |
| 3 | (Spain) José María Olazábal | 434,766 |
| 4 | (Germany) Bernhard Langer | 320,450 |
| 5 | (Northern Ireland) Ronan Rafferty | 309,851 |
| 6 | (Australia) Mike Harwood | 280,084 |
| 7 | (Scotland) Sam Torrance | 248,203 |
| 8 | (Northern Ireland) David Feherty | 237,830 |
| 9 | (Australia) Rodger Davis | 233,841 |
| 10 | (England) Mark James | 229,742 |

== Awards ==
| Award | Winner | Ref. |
|---|---|---|
| Golfer of the Year | (England) Nick Faldo | |
| Sir Henry Cotton Rookie of the Year | (England) Russell Claydon | |

== See also ==
- 1990 Challenge Tour
