= 1986 Dunhill Cup =

Coordinates: 56.351484°N 2.816147°W

Tournament information
- Dates: 25–28 September
- Location: St Andrews, Scotland
- Course(s): Old Course at St Andrews
- Format: Match play

Statistics
- Par: 72
- Length: 6,933 yards (6,340 m)
- Field: 16 teams of 3 players
- Prize fund: US$1,000,000
- Winner's share: US$300,000

Champion
- Australia (Rodger Davis, David Graham, Greg Norman)

The 1986 Dunhill Cup was the second Dunhill Cup. It was a team tournament featuring 16 countries, each represented by three players. The Cup was played 25–28 September at the Old Course at St Andrews in Scotland. The sponsor was the Alfred Dunhill company. The Australian team of Rodger Davis, David Graham, and Greg Norman beat the Japanese team of Tsuneyuki Nakajima, Naomichi Ozaki, and Tateo Ozaki in the final. It was the second win for the Australian team.

== Format ==
The Cup was played as a single-elimination, match play event played over four days. The top eight teams were seeded with the remaining teams randomly placed in the bracket. In each match, the three players were paired with their opponents and played 18 holes at medal match play. Tied matches were extended to a sudden-death playoff only if they affected the outcome between the two teams.

== Bracket ==
First round
1	United States	3
Zambia	0
8	Canada	2
Sweden	1
5	England	1
Argentina	2
4	Japan	3
South Korea	0
2	Australia	3
Italy	0
7	Wales	3
New Zealand	0
6	Spain	1
Ireland	2
3	Scotland	3
Indonesia	0

Quarter-finals
1	United States	2
8	Canada	1
Argentina	1
4	Japan	2
2	Australia	3
7	Wales	0
Ireland	0
3	Scotland	3

Semi-finals
1	United States	1
4	Japan	2
2	Australia	2
3	Scotland	1

Final
4	Japan	0
2	Australia	3
Third place
1	United States	1
3	Scotland	2

== Round by round scores ==
=== First round ===
United States – 3		Zambia – 0	
Player	Score	Player	Score
Raymond Floyd	72	P. Sinyama	81
Mark O'Meara	70	S. Mwanza	83
Lanny Wadkins	70	P. Tembo	79

Canada – 2		Sweden – 1	
Player	Score	Player	Score
Dave Barr	69	Mats Lanner	74
Richard Zokol	75	Ove Sellberg	72
Dan Halldorson	69	Anders Forsbrand	71

England – 1		Argentina – 2	
Player	Score	Player	Score
Howard Clark	70	Vicente Fernández	67
Gordon J. Brand	70	Adan Sowa	69
Nick Faldo	69	Armando Saavedra	72

Japan – 3		South Korea – 0	
Player	Score	Player	Score
Tsuneyuki Nakajima	68	Choi Yoon-Soo	78
Tateo Ozaki	71	Choi Sang-Ho	79
Naomichi Ozaki	67	Cho Ho-Sang	74

Australia – 3		Italy – 0	
Player	Score	Player	Score
Rodger Davis	65	Costantino Rocca	70
Greg Norman	67	Giuseppe Calì	77
David Graham	68	Baldovino Dassù	79

Wales – 3		New Zealand – 0	
Player	Score	Player	Score
Mark Mouland	69	Greg Turner	77
Ian Woosnam	66	Frank Nobilo	71
Philip Parkin	69	Bob Charles	73

Scotland – 3		Indonesia – 0	
Player	Score	Player	Score
Sam Torrance	68	Sumarno	76
Gordon Brand Jnr	71	M. Naasim	83
Sandy Lyle	69	E. Tachyana	83

Spain – 1		Ireland – 2	
Player	Score	Player	Score
Seve Ballesteros	74	Ronan Rafferty	67
José Rivero	71	David Feherty	73
José María Olazábal	73	Des Smyth	71

=== Quarter-finals ===
United States – 2		Canada – 1	
Player	Score	Player	Score
Mark O'Meara	72	Richard Zokol	76
Lanny Wadkins	68	Dave Barr	66
Raymond Floyd	69	Dan Halldorson	70

Japan – 2		Argentina – 1	
Player	Score	Player	Score
Tsuneyuki Nakajima	67	Vicente Fernández	68
Naomichi Ozaki	69	Adan Sowa	71
Tateo Ozaki	72	Armando Saavedra	69

Australia – 3		Wales – 0	
Player	Score	Player	Score
Rodger Davis	71	Mark Mouland	73
Greg Norman	67	Ian Woosnam	71
David Graham	68	Philip Parkin	69

Scotland – 3		Ireland – 0	
Player	Score	Player	Score
Gordon Brand Jnr	68	Ronan Rafferty	70
Sam Torrance	70	Des Smyth	72
Sandy Lyle	70	David Feherty	72

=== Semi-finals ===
United States – 1		Japan – 2	
Player	Score	Player	Score
Mark O'Meara	70	Tateo Ozaki	77
Lanny Wadkins	74	Naomichi Ozaki	69
Raymond Floyd	76	Tsuneyuki Nakajima	69

Australia – 2		Scotland – 1	
Player	Score	Player	Score
Rodger Davis	72	Gordon Brand Jnr	74
David Graham	70	Sandy Lyle	68
Greg Norman	70	Sam Torrance	72

=== Final ===
Australia – 3		Japan – 0	
Player	Score	Player	Score
Rodger Davis	76	Tateo Ozaki	81
David Graham	81	Naomichi Ozaki	82
Greg Norman	73	Tsuneyuki Nakajima	76

=== Third place ===
United States – 1		Scotland – 2	
Player	Score	Player	Score
Mark O'Meara	78	Gordon Brand Jnr	75
Raymond Floyd	73	Sam Torrance	78
Lanny Wadkins	78	Sandy Lyle	73

== Team results ==
Country	Place	W	L	Seed
Australia	1	11	1	2
Japan	2	7	5	4
Scotland	3	9	3	3
United States	4	7	5	1
Argentina	T5	3	3	
Canada	T5	3	3	8
Wales	T5	3	3	7
Ireland	T5	2	4	
England	T9	1	2	5
Spain	T9	1	2	6
Sweden	T9	1	2	
Indonesia	T9	0	3	
Italy	T9	0	3	
New Zealand	T9	0	3	
South Korea	T9	0	3	
Zambia	T9	0	3	

== Player results ==
Country	Player	W	L
Australia	Rodger Davis	4	0
Australia	Greg Norman	4	0
Australia	David Graham	3	1
Japan	Tsuneyuki Nakajima	3	1
Japan	Naomichi Ozaki	3	1
Japan	Tateo Ozaki	1	3
Scotland	Sandy Lyle	4	0
Scotland	Gordon Brand Jnr	3	1
Scotland	Sam Torrance	2	2
United States	Raymond Floyd	3	1
United States	Mark O'Meara	3	1
United States	Lanny Wadkins	1	3
Argentina	Vicente Fernández	1	1
Argentina	Armando Saavedra	1	1
Argentina	Adan Sowa	1	1
Canada	Dave Barr	2	0
Canada	Dan Halldorson	1	1
Canada	Richard Zokol	0	2
Ireland	Ronan Rafferty	1	1
Ireland	Des Smyth	1	1
Ireland	David Feherty	0	2
Wales	Mark Mouland	1	1
Wales	Philip Parkin	1	1
Wales	Ian Woosnam	1	1
England	Nick Faldo	1	0
England	Gordon J. Brand	0	1
England	Howard Clark	0	1
Spain	José Rivero	1	0
Spain	Seve Ballesteros	0	1
Spain	José María Olazábal	0	1
Indonesia	M. Naasim	0	1
Indonesia	Sumarno	0	1
Indonesia	E. Tachyana	0	1
Italy	Giuseppe Calì	0	1
Italy	Baldovino Dassù	0	1
Italy	Costantino Rocca	0	1
South Korea	Cho Ho-Sang	0	1
South Korea	Choi Sang-Ho	0	1
South Korea	Choi Yoon-Soo	0	1
New Zealand	Bob Charles	0	1
New Zealand	Frank Nobilo	0	1
New Zealand	Greg Turner	0	1
Sweden	Ove Sellberg	1	0
Sweden	Anders Forsbrand	0	1
Sweden	Mats Lanner	0	1
Zambia	S. Mwanza	0	1
Zambia	P. Sinyama	0	1
Zambia	P. Tembo	0	1
