= 1989 World Cup (men's golf) =

Coordinates: 36°31′0″N 4°53′0″W

Tournament information
- Dates: 16–19 November
- Location: Marbella, Spain
- Course: Real Club de Golf Las Brisas
- Format: 36 holes stroke play combined score

Statistics
- Par: 72
- Length: 6,794 yards (6,212 m)
- Field: 32 two-man teams
- Cut: None
- Prize fund: US$1 million
- Winner's share: $240,000 team $50,000 individual

Champion
- Australia; Peter Fowler & Wayne Grady
- 278 (−10)

The 1989 World Cup took place 16–19 November at Las Brisas Golf Club in Marbella, Spain. It was the 35th World Cup event. The tournament was shortened, due to rain, from 72 to 36 holes. Both the second round on Friday and the fourth round on Sunday were cancelled and only the Thursday and Saturday rounds were counted in the competition. The World Cup, previously named the Canada Cup, had been shortened before, due to bad weather; 1963, 1972 and 1984, but it was the first time since the event was instituted in 1953, that two full rounds were lost.

It was a stroke play team event with 32 teams. Each team consisted of two players from a country. The combined score of each team determined the team results. The Australia team of Peter Fowler and Wayne Grady won by three strokes over the Spain team of José María Cañizares and José María Olazábal. The individual competition was won by Fowler. Beside the prize money mentioned, Fowler won additional US$10,000 for having the lowest individual score in the first round and the Australia team won additional US$10,000 for the lowest team score the first day.

== Teams ==
Country	Players
Argentina	José Cóceres and Miguel Fernández
Australia	Peter Fowler and Wayne Grady
Austria	Johannes Lambert and Franz Laimer
Belgium	Olivier Buysse and Andre Van Damme
Brazil	Antonio Nascimento and Rafael Navarro
Canada	Jerry Anderson and Dave Barr
Colombia	Eduardo Herrera and Ivan Rengifo
Denmark	Anders Sørensen and Steen Tinning
England	Denis Durnian and Mark Roe
France	Emmanuel Dussart and Jean van de Velde
Greece	Vassilios Karatzias and Craigen Pappas
Ireland	Christy O'Connor Jnr and Des Smyth
Italy	Alberto Binaghi and Massimo Mannelli
Japan	Yoshiyuki Isomura and Yoshimi Niizeki
Mexico	Feliciano Esparza and Carlos Espinoza
Netherlands	Ruud Bos and Chris van de Velde
New Zealand	Simon Owen and Greg Turner
Norway	Per Haugsrud and Tom Vollan
Philippines	Frankie Miñoza and Mario Siodina
Portugal	Daniel Silva and Rogehrio Valente
Scotland	Gordon Brand Jnr and Sam Torrance
South Korea	Choi Yoon-soo and Park Nam-sin
Spain	José María Cañizares and José María Olazábal
Sweden	Mats Lanner and Ove Sellberg
Switzerland	Karim Baradia and Paolo Quirici
Taiwan	Lu Chien-soon and Yu Chin-han
Thailand	Boonchu Ruangkit and Thaworn Wiratchant
Uruguay	Alvaro Canessi and Enrique Fernandez
United States	Paul Azinger and Mark McCumber
Venezuela	Francisco Alvaro and Ramón Muñoz
Wales	Mark Mouland and Philip Parkin
West Germany	Torsten Giedeon and Heinz-Peter Thül

== Scores ==
Team

Place	Country	Score	To par	Money (US$) (per team)
1	Australia	134-144=278	−10	240,000
2	Spain	141-140=281	−7	120,000
T3	Sweden	142-145=287	−1	76,000
T3	United States	143-144=287	−1	76,000
5	Wales	147-151=288	E	50,000
T6	Argentina	148-142=290	+2	35,000
T6	New Zealand	145-145=290	+2	35,000
T8	Denmark	148-143=291	+3	21,000
T8	England	145-146=291	+3	21,000
10	Ireland	145-149=294	+6	16,000
11	Scotland	149-146=295	+7	14,000
T12	France	148-148=296	+8	10,000
T12	Italy	148-148=296	+8	10,000
T12	West Germany	148-148=296	+8	10,000
15	Canada	151-147=298	+10	7,000
16	Japan	149-150=299	+11	7,000
17	Philippines	152-148=300	+12	7,000
18	Venezuela	152-151=303	+15	7,000
T19	Colombia	159-147=306	+18	7,000
T19	Switzerland	150-156=306	+18	7,000
21	South Korea	157-151=308	+20	7,000
22	Greece	156-154=310	+22	7,000
T23	Brazil	151-160=311	+23	7,000
T23	Taiwan	157-154=311	+23	7,000
25	Uruguay	160-155=315	+27	7,000
T26	Mexico	155-161=316	+28	7,000
T26	Netherlands	160-156=316	+28	7,000
T26	Norway	159-157=316	+28	7,000
29	Portugal	161-156=317	+29	7,000
30	Thailand	158-162=320	+32	7,000
31	Austria	162-161=323	+35	7,000
32	Belgium	172-164=336	+48	7,000

International Trophy

Place	Player	Country	Score	To par	Money (US$)
1	Peter Fowler	Australia	66-71=137	−7	50,000
T2	José María Cañizares	Spain	71-67=138	−6	
T2	Anders Sørensen	Denmark	70-68=138	−6	
4	Miguel Fernández	Argentina	71-69=140	−4	
T5	Paul Azinger	United States	70-71=141	−3	
T5	Wayne Grady	Australia	68-73=141	−3	
T5	Mark Roe	England	71-70=141	−3	
8	Mats Lanner	Sweden	69-73=142	−2	
9	José María Olazábal	Spain	70-73=143	−1	
T10	Mark Mouland	Wales	75-69=144	E	
T10	Simon Owen	New Zealand	72-72=144	E	
T10	Philip Parkin	Wales	72-72=144	E	
