= 1988 World Cup (men's golf) =

Coordinates: 37.97°S 145.03°E

Tournament information
- Dates: 8–11 December
- Location: Melbourne, Australia
- Courses: Royal Melbourne Golf Club composite of East and West Courses
- Format: 72 holes stroke play combined score

Statistics
- Par: 72
- Length: 6,985 yards (6,387 m)
- Field: 32 two-man teams
- Cut: None
- Prize fund: US$750,000
- Winner's share: $200,000 team $50,000 individual

Champion
- United States; Ben Crenshaw & Mark McCumber
- 560 (−16)

Location map
- Location in Australia Location in Victoria Location in greater Melbourne

The 1988 World Cup took place 8–11 December at Royal Melbourne Golf Club in Melbourne, Australia. It was the 34th World Cup event. It was a stroke play team event with 32 teams. Each team consisted of two players from a country. 22 teams were qualified through the 1987 tournament and another 10 teams were invited. The combined score of each team determined the team results. The United States team of Ben Crenshaw and Mark McCumber won by one stroke over the Japan team of brothers Masashi "Jumbo" Ozaki and Tateo "Jet" Ozaki The individual competition was won by Crenshaw.

== Teams ==
Country	Players
Argentina	Eduardo Romero and Jorge Soto
Australia	Roger Mackay and Peter Senior
Brazil	Priscillo Diniz and Rafael Navarro
Canada	Dave Barr and Brent Franklin
Colombia	Rogelio Gonzalez and Eduardo Herrera
Denmark	Anders Sørensen and Steen Tinning
England	Mark James and Barry Lane
Finland	Markku Louhio and Timo Sipponen
France	Emmanuel Dussart and Marc Pendariès
Hong Kong	Yau Sui Ming and Alex Tang
Indonesia	Kasiyadi and Gimin Suwirjo
India	Basad Ali and Rohtas Singh
Ireland	Ronan Rafferty and Des Smyth
Italy	Giuseppe Calì and Costantino Rocca
Japan	Masashi Ozaki and Tateo Ozaki
Malaysia	Barrie Buluah and Sahabuddin Yusof
Mexico	Rafael Alarcón and Enrique Serna
Netherlands	Kees Borst and Willem Swart
New Zealand	Frank Nobilo and Greg Turner
Philippines	Rudy Lavares and Mario Siodina
Scotland	Gordon Brand Jnr and Colin Montgomerie
South Korea	Choi Sang-ho and Park Nam-sin
Spain	Manuel Piñero and José Rivero
Sweden	Anders Forsbrand and Johan Ryström
Switzerland	Karim Baradia and Helmuth Schumacher
Taiwan	Hsu Sheng-san and Li Wen-sheng
Thailand	Boonchu Ruangkit and Somsakdi Srisangar
United States	Ben Crenshaw and Mark McCumber
Venezuela	Ramón Muñoz and Julian Santana
Wales	Mark Mouland and David Llewellyn
West Germany	Wolfgang John and Carlo Knauss
Zimbabwe	Anthony Edwards and Tim Price

== Scores ==
Team

Place	Country	Score	To par	Money (US$) (per team)
1	United States	139-137-137-147=560	−16	200,000
2	Japan	138-140-138-145=561	−15	110,000
3	Australia	143-131-142-146=562	−14	80,000
4	Canada	144-139-140-146=569	−7	65,000
5	Scotland	140-140-149-141=570	−6	41,000
6	New Zealand	139-140-140-152=571	−5	30,000
7	Spain	139-140-139-154=572	−4	20,000
8	Argentina	145-146-143-142=576	E	16,000
T9	Ireland	142-144-142-152=580	+4	7,666
T9	Italy	147-143-142-148=580	+4	7,666
T9	Taiwan	143-137-148-152=580	+4	7,666
T12	Denmark	145-144-141-152=582	+6	5,000
T12	Wales	150-142-138-152=582	+6	5,000
14	Brazil	140-147-142-154=583	+9	5,000
T15	England	142-149-142-156=589	+13	5,000
T15	Thailand	149-146-144-150=589	+13	5,000
17	Mexico	149-145-140-158=591	+15	5,000
18	Colombia	143-152-145-152=592	+16	5,000
T19	France	153-143-147-154=597	+21	5,000
T19	Sweden	146-151-148-152=597	+21	5,000
21	South Korea	146-153-146-153=598	+22	5,000
22	Finland	147-157-153-159=606	+30	5,000
23	Philippines	151-152-146-161=610	+34	5,000
24	India	151-158-147-159=615	+39	5,000
25	Venezuela	151-155-145-165=616	+40	5,000
26	West Germany	156-152-151-158=617	+41	5,000
27	Zimbabwe	151-155-154-160=620	+44	5,000
28	Switzerland	143-157-158-164=622	+46	5,000
29	Malaysia	152-153-150-170=625	+49	5,000
30	Hong Kong	158-156-155-160=629	+53	5,000
31	Indonesia	157-154-163-163=637	+61	5,000
32	Netherlands	160-157-162-161=640	+64	5,000

International Trophy

Place	Player	Country	Score	To par	Money (US$)
1	Ben Crenshaw	United States	68-67-66-74=275	−13	50,000
T2	Dave Barr	Canada	70-67-65-75=276	−12	
T2	Tateo Ozaki	Japan	68-69-67-72=276	−12	
4	Peter Senior	Australia	70-68-70-70=277	−11	
T5	Gordon Brand Jnr	Scotland	71-66-73-69=279	−9	
T5	Rafael Navarro	Brazil	71-74-66-68=279	−9	
7	Rafael Alarcón	Mexico	69-72-67-75=283	−5	
T8	Li Wen-cheng	Taiwan	69-66-75-74=284	−4	
T8	Roger Mackay	Australia	73-63-72-76=284	−4	
T8	Frank Nobilo	New Zealand	67-69-70-78=284	−4	
T8	Ronan Rafferty	Ireland	71-70-68-75=284	−4	
