= 1983 European Amateur Team Championship =

Golf competition

Tournament information
- Dates: 22–26 June 1983
- Location: Paris, France; 49°12′20″N 2°29′00″E
- Course: Golf de Chantilly
- Organized by: European Golf Association
- Format: Qualification round: 36 holes stroke play Knock-out match-play

Statistics
- Par: 71
- Length: 7,256 yards (6,635 m)
- Field: 19 teams 114 players

Champion
- Ireland; John Carr, Tom Cleary, Garth McGimpsey, Mick Morris, Arthur Pierse, Philip Walton
- Qualification round: 730 (+20); Final match: 5–2
- Location in Europe Location in France Location in Hauts-de-France

The 1983 European Amateur Team Championship took place 22–26 June at Golf de Chantilly, in Chantilly, France. It was the 13th men's golf European Amateur Team Championship.

== Venue ==
The hosting club was founded in 1909. The Vineuil Course, situated in Chantilly, in the forest of the Hauts-de-France region of Northern France, 50 kilometres (30 miles) north of the center of Paris, close to the Château de Chantilly and Chantilly Racecourse, was originally designed by John Henry Taylor and later redesigned by Tom Simpson and Donald Steel. It had previously hosted eight editions of the Open de France.

For the 1983 European Amateur Team Championship, the course was set up with par 71 over 7,256 yards.

== Format ==
Each team consisted of five or six players, playing two rounds of an opening stroke-play qualifying competition over two days, counting the five best scores each day for each team.

The eight best teams formed flight A, in knock-out match-play over the next three days. The teams were seeded based on their positions after the stroke play. The first placed team were drawn to play the quarter-final against the eight placed team, the second against the seventh, the third against the sixth and the fourth against the fifth. Teams were allowed to use six players during the team matches, selecting four of them in the two morning foursome games and five players in to the afternoon single games. Games all square at the 18th hole were declared halved, if the team match was already decided.

The seven teams placed 9–15 in the qualification stroke-play formed flight B and the four teams placed 16–19 formed flight C, to play similar knock-out play to decide their final positions.

== Teams ==
19 nation teams contested the event. Each team consisted of five or six players.

Players in the teams

Country	Players
Austria	Christian Czerny, Johann Lamberg, Klaus Nierlich, O. Paul, Fritz Porstendorfer, E. Posamentyr
Belgium	Patrick Bonnelance, Olivier Buysse, Alain Eaton, Michel Eaton, Thierry Goosens, Roger Rabaey
Denmark	Henry Knudsen, Leif Nyholm, Jacob Rasmussen, Søren Rolner, Anders Sørensen, Steen Tinning
England	Peter Hedges, Stephen Keppler, Peter McEvoy, Andrew Oldcorn, Jonathan Plaxton, Martin Thompson
Finland	Patrick Hallama, Kari Kuivasaari, Markku Louhio, Juha Selin, Timo Sipponen, Jouni Vilmunen
France	Sven Boinet, Alexis Godillot, Marc Pendariès, Eric Pery, Philippe Ploujoux, Jean-Louis Schneider
Greece	George Aronis, V. Aronis, S. Oikonomou, George Vafiadis, Stefan Vafiadis, Chris Valasakis
Iceland	Hannes Eyvindsson, G. Kristinsson, Ragnar Olafsson, Sigurdur Petursson, Sigurdur Sigurdsson, Björgvin Thorsteinsson
Ireland	John Carr, Tom Cleary, Garth McGimpsey, Mick Morris, Arthur Pierse, Philip Walton
Italy	Mauro Bianco, Alberto Binaghi, Emanuele Bolognesi, Andrea Canessa, Silvio Grappasonni, Sergio Prati
Luxembourg	Al. Graas, An. Graas, Y. Görgen, J.F. Schock, Ch. Schock, G. Schumann
Netherlands	Ger Bazuin, Joost Hage, Bart Nolte, R. Tans, M. Peetoom, S. Van Vliet
Norway	Eric Bjerkholt, Tom Fredriksen, Gard Midtvåge, Ragnvald Risan, Tore Sviland, Lars-Erik Underthun
Scotland	Frank Coutts, Colin Dalgleish, George MacGregor, Lindsay Mann, Stephen McAllister, Allan Thomson
Spain	Ignacio Gervás, Julián García-Mayoral, José María Olazábal, Alejo Ollé, Borja Queipo de Llano, Román Taya
Sweden	Thomas Andersson, Antero Baburin, Magnus Hennberg, Per Jönsson, Anders Sandgren, Björn Svedin
Switzerland	Charles André Bagnoud, Michael Buchter, Markus Frank, Alain Rey, Johhny Storjohann, Erwin Vonlanthen
Wales	R.D. Broad, G. Davies, John Roger Jones, David McLean, Philip Parkin, D.K. Wood
West Germany	Thomas Dekorsy, Hans-Günter Reiter, Frank Schlig, Ulrich Schulte, Christoph Städler, Ralf Thielemann

== Winners ==
Team Scotland won the opening 36-hole competition, with a score of 8 over par 718.

Individual leader was Peter McEvoy, England, with a score of 8-under-par 134, five strokes ahead of Tore Christian Sviland, Norway. In his second round, McEvoy scored 8 birdies and 10 pars for an 8-under-par 63 score on the Chantilly course.

Team Ireland won the gold medal, earning their third title, beating Spain in the final 5–2. Team Italy earned the bronze on third place, after beating Scotland 4–3 in the bronze match.

== Results ==
Qualification round

Team standings

Place	Country	Score	To par
1	Scotland	718	+8
2	England	721	+11
3	Italy	725	+15
4	Ireland	730	+20
5	France	733	+23
6	Denmark	737	+27
7	Spain	739	+29
T8	Norway *	747	+37
T8	West Germany	747	+37
10	Sweden	748	+38
11	Wales	750	+40
12	Switzerland	754	+44
13	Belgium	758	+48
14	Finland	773	+63
15	Greece	775	+65
16	Netherlands	781	+71
17	Austria	785	+75
18	Iceland	808	+88
19	Luxembourg	849	+139

* Note: In the event of a tie the order was determined by the best total of the two non-counting scores of the two rounds.

Individual leaders

Place	Player	Country	Score	To par
1	Peter McEvoy	England	71-63=134	−8
2	Tore Sviland	Norway	69-70=139	−3
T3	Alberto Binaghi	Italy	70-71=141	−1
T3	Lindsay Mann	Scotland	71-70=141	−1
T5	Frank Coutts	Scotland	71-71=142	E
T6	Thierry Goosens	Belgium	72-71=143	+1
T6	Philip Parkin	Wales	73-70=143	+1
T6	Steen Tinning	Denmark	74-69=143	+1

Note: There was no official award for the lowest individual scores.

Flight A

Bracket

Quarter finals
Spain	4
England	3
Italy	4
Denmark	3
Ireland	6
France	1
Scotland	4
Norway	3

Semi finals
Spain	4.5
Italy	2.5
Ireland	4
Scotland	3

Final
Ireland	5
Spain	2
Bronze match
Italy	4
Scotland	3

Elimination matches
England	6
Denmark	1
France	7
Norway	0

Match for 5th place
England	4.5
France	2.5
Match for 7th place
Denmark	5
Norway	2

Final games

Ireland	Spain
5	2
P. Walton / G. McGimpsey 4 & 3	A. Ollé / J. Garcia-Mayoral
A. Pierse / J. Carr 22nd hole	J.M. Olazábal / I. Gervás
Philip Walton 4 & 3	Alejo Ollé
Arthur Pierse AS *	Borjan Quiepo de Llano AS *
Garth McGimpsey 2 & 1	Román Taya 2 & 1
Mick Morris AS *	Ignacio Gervás AS *
Tom Cleary	José María Olazábal 8 & 7

* Note: Games declared halved, since team match already decided.

Flight B

Bracket

Round 1
Sweden	6
Greece	1
Wales	5
Finland	2
Switzerland	4
Belgium	3

Round 2
Sweden	6
Wales	1
Switzerland	4
West Germany	3

Match for 9th place
Sweden	5
Switzerland	2
Match for 11th place
West Germany	4.5
Wales	2.5

Round 1

Match for 13th place
Finland	4.5
Belgium	2.5

Flight C

Round 1
Austria	5
Iceland	2
Netherlands	4.5
Luxembourg	2.5

Match for 16th place
Austria	5
Netherlands	2
Match for 18th place
Iceland	5
Luxembourg	2

Final standings

Place	Country
1st place, gold medalist(s)	Ireland
2nd place, silver medalist(s)	Spain
3rd place, bronze medalist(s)	Italy
4	Scotland
5	England
6	France
7	Denmark
8	Norway
9	Sweden
10	Switzerland
11	West Germany
12	Wales
13	Finland
14	Belgium
15	Greece
16	Austria
17	Netherlands
18	Iceland
19	Luxembourg

== See also ==
- Eisenhower Trophy – biennial world amateur team golf championship for men organized by the International Golf Federation.
- European Ladies' Team Championship – European amateur team golf championship for women organised by the European Golf Association.
