= José Rivero =

Spanish golfer

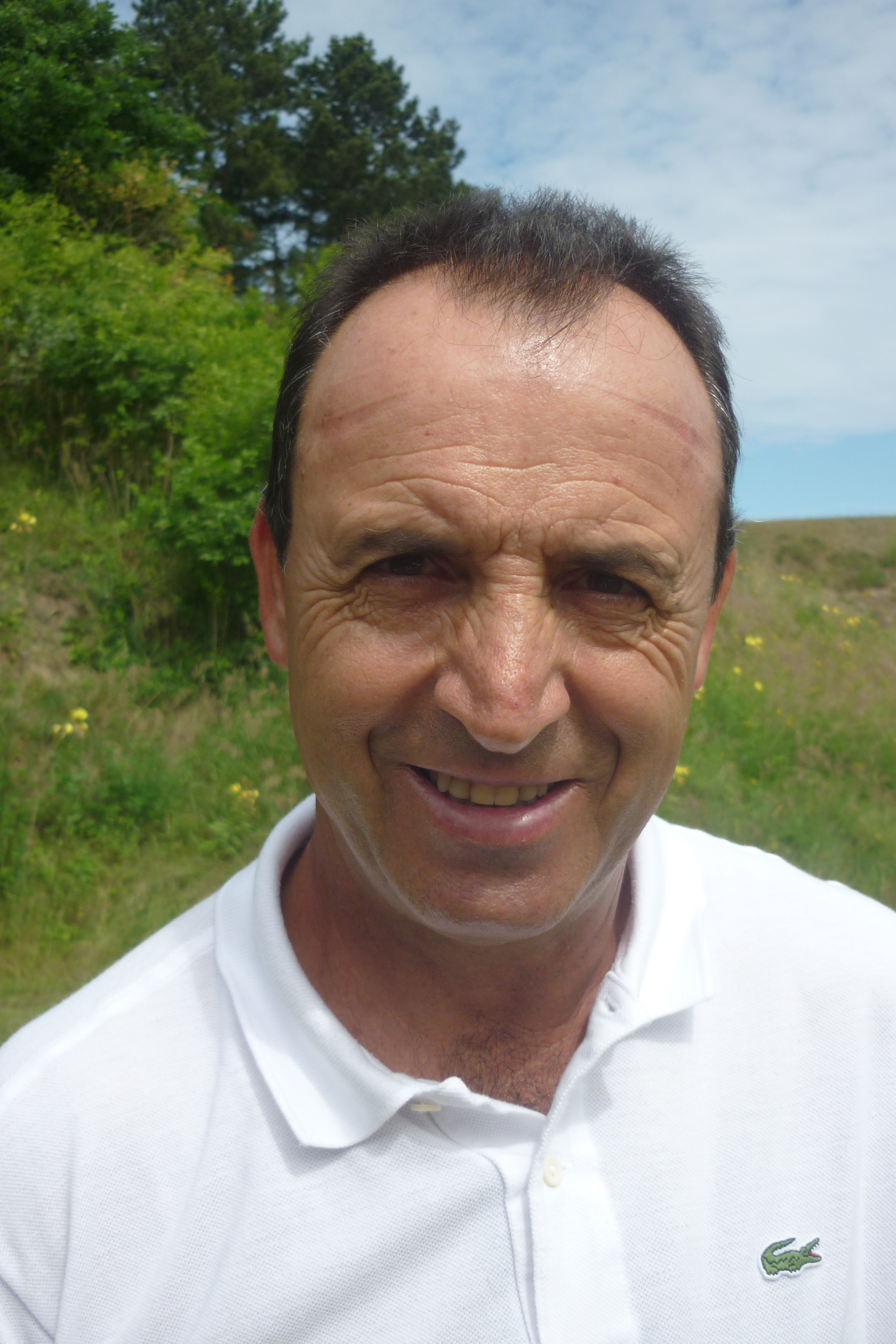

Personal information
- Nickname: Pepin
- Nationality: Spain
- Born: 20 September 1955 (age 71) Madrid, Spain
- Height: 5 ft 8 in (1.73 m)

Career
- Sport: Golf
- Turned professional: 1973
- Current tours: European Senior Tour; Champions Tour
- Former tour: European Tour
- Professional wins: 9
- Highest ranking: 43 (2 April 1989)

Number of wins by tour
- European Tour: 4
- European Senior Tour: 3
- Other: 2

Best results in major championships
- Masters Tournament: DNP
- PGA Championship: DNP
- U.S. Open: DNP
- The Open Championship: T3: 1985

Achievements and awards
- European Seniors Tour Rookie of the Year: 2006

José Rivero (born 20 September 1955) is a Spanish professional golfer.

== Career ==
He started his golf career as a caddie and turned professional in 1973. He was a full member of the European Tour from 1983 to 2001 and he won four European Tour events. He made the top fifteen on the Order of Merit five times, including a best of tenth in 1988.

Rivero was a member of the first two winning European Ryder Cup teams after the inclusion of Continental European players, at The Belfry in 1985 and Muirfield Village in 1987. He represented Spain in the Alfred Dunhill Cup and the World Cup on many occasions, winning the latter in 1984 in partnership with José María Cañizares.

Rivero became eligible for senior golf in September 2005. He played four events on the European Senior Tour that year and placed in the top six in each of them. His first win as a senior came at the 2006 DGM Barbados Open.

== Professional wins (9) ==
=== European Tour wins (4) ===
No.	Date	Tournament	Winning score	Margin of victory	Runner(s)-up
1	14 Jul 1984	Lawrence Batley International Golf Classic	−8 (73-69-71-67=280)	1 stroke	(Spain) José María Cañizares
2	13 Jun 1987	Peugeot Open de France	−19 (68-67-71-63=269)	1 stroke	(England) Howard Clark
3	2 Jul 1988	Monte Carlo Open	−15 (65-64-67-65=261)	2 strokes	(Zimbabwe) Mark McNulty
4	14 Mar 1992	Catalan Open	−8 (70-71-72-67=280)	1 stroke	(Spain) José María Cañizares, (Sweden) Johan Ryström, (England) Haydn Selby-Green

European Tour playoff record (0–1)

No.	Year	Tournament	Opponent	Result
1	1987	Lancia Italian Open	(Scotland) Sam Torrance	Lost to par on sixth extra hole

=== Other wins (2) ===
- 1984 World Cup (with José María Cañizares)
- 1998 Oki APG (Spain)

=== European Seniors Tour wins (3) ===
No.	Date	Tournament	Winning score	Margin of victory	Runner(s)-up
1	3 Mar 2006	DGM Barbados Open	−9 (70-66-71=207)	Playoff	(England) David J. Russell
2	18 Jun 2006	Firstplus Wales Seniors Open	−4 (70-74-68=212)	1 stroke	(Spain) Juan Quirós, (England) David J. Russell, (Scotland) Sam Torrance, (France) Géry Watine
3	30 Sep 2007	Charles Church Scottish Seniors Open	−10 (70-66-70=206)	1 stroke	(Scotland) Ross Drummond

European Seniors Tour playoff record (1–0)

No.	Year	Tournament	Opponent	Result
1	2006	DGM Barbados Open	(England) David J. Russell	Won with birdie on fourth extra hole

== Results in major championships ==
Tournament	1984	1985	1986	1987	1988	1989	1990	1991	1992	1993	1994	1995	1996
The Open Championship	CUT	T3	CUT	CUT	T16	T42	T25	T57	CUT	T14	CUT	T68	CUT

Note: Rivero only played in The Open Championship.

Top 10

CUT = missed the half-way cut
"T" indicates a tie for a place

== Team appearances ==
- Hennessy Cognac Cup (representing Spain): 1984
- World Cup (representing Spain): 1984 (winners), 1987, 1988, 1990, 1991, 1992, 1993, 1994
- Ryder Cup (representing Europe): 1985 (winners), 1987 (winners)
- Dunhill Cup (representing Spain): 1986, 1987, 1988, 1989, 1990, 1991, 1992, 1993, 1994, 1995
- Kirin Cup (representing Europe): 1988
