= 1989 Dunhill Cup =

Coordinates: 56.351484°N 2.816147°W

Tournament information
- Dates: 28 September – 1 October
- Location: St Andrews, Scotland
- Course: Old Course at St Andrews
- Format: Match play

Statistics
- Par: 72
- Length: 6,933 yards (6,340 m)
- Field: 16 teams of 3 players
- Prize fund: US$1,200,000
- Winner's share: US$300,000

Champion
- United States (Mark Calcavecchia, Tom Kite, Curtis Strange)

The 1989 Dunhill Cup was the fifth Dunhill Cup. It was a team golf tournament featuring 16 countries, each represented by three players. The Cup was played 28 September – 1 October at the Old Course at St Andrews in Scotland. The sponsor was the Alfred Dunhill company. The American team of Mark Calcavecchia, Tom Kite, and Curtis Strange beat the Japanese team of Hajime Meshiai, Naomichi Ozaki, and Koichi Suzuki in the final. It was the first time the number one seeded team won the Cup.

== Format ==
The Cup was played as a single-elimination, match play event played over four days. The top eight teams were seeded with the remaining teams randomly placed in the bracket. In each match, the three players were paired with their opponents and played 18 holes at medal match play. Tied matches were extended to a sudden-death playoff only if they affected the outcome between the two teams. In the first format change of the Cup, the final was played as two sets of three 18-hole matches, instead of one set.

== Bracket ==
First round
1	United States	2
South Korea	1
8	Wales	0.5
Argentina	2.5
5	Ireland	2
Taiwan	1
4	Spain	1
Sweden	2
2	Australia	1
France	2
7	Japan	2
Italy	1
6	England	2
Canada	1
3	Scotland	2
New Zealand	1

Quarter-finals
1	United States	3
Argentina	0
5	Ireland	3
Sweden	0
France	0
7	Japan	3
6	England	2
3	Scotland	1

Semi-finals
1	United States	2
5	Ireland	1
7	Japan	2
6	England	1

Final
1	United States	3.5
7	Japan	2.5
Third place
5	Ireland	1
6	England	2

== Round by round scores ==
=== First round ===
Wales – 0.5		Argentina – 2.5	
Player	Score	Player	Score
Philip Parkin	75	Eduardo Romero	68
Mark Mouland	70	Vicente Fernández	70
Ian Woosnam	72	Miguel Fernández	69

United States – 2		South Korea – 1	
Player	Score	Player	Score
Mark Calcavecchia	74	Park Nam-Sin	70
Tom Kite	72	Choi Yoon-Soo	75
Curtis Strange	67	Choi Sang-Ho	79

Spain – 1		Sweden – 2	
Player	Score	Player	Score
José María Olazábal	67	Mats Lanner	70
José María Cañizares	72	Ove Sellberg	74
José Rivero	72	Magnus Persson	74

Ireland – 2		Taiwan – 1	
Player	Score	Player	Score
Philip Walton	69	Lu Chien-soon	76
Ronan Rafferty	73	Yu Chin-Han	74
Christy O'Connor Jnr	73	Hsieh Chin-sheng	73

O'Connor won on fourth playoff hole.

Scotland – 2		New Zealand – 1	
Player	Score	Player	Score
Gordon Brand Jnr	76	Simon Owen	72
Sam Torrance	67	Grant Waite	70
Sandy Lyle	66	Frank Nobilo	70

Japan – 2		Italy – 1	
Player	Score	Player	Score
Koichi Suzuki	74	Massimo Mannelli	76
Naomichi Ozaki	68	Costantino Rocca	73
Hajime Meshiai	73	Alberto Binaghi	72

Australia – 1		France – 2	
Player	Score	Player	Score
Ian Baker-Finch	73	Emmanuel Dussart	72
Greg Norman	73	Marc Pendariès	74
Wayne Grady	67	Géry Watine	70

England – 2		Canada – 1	
Player	Score	Player	Score
Mark James	73	Dave Barr	74
Howard Clark	74	Dan Halldorson	72
Denis Durnian	72	Richard Zokol	72

Durnian won on second playoff hole.

=== Quarter-finals ===
United States – 3		Argentina – 0	
Player	Score	Player	Score
Tom Kite	70	Vicente Fernández	72
Mark Calcavecchia	72	Miguel Fernández	77
Mark O'Meara	70	Nobuo Serizawa	70

Japan – 3		France – 0	
Player	Score	Player	Score
Naomichi Ozaki	74	Emmanuel Dussart	73
Koichi Suzuki	73	Marc Pendariès	75
Hajime Meshiai	72	Géry Watine	74

Ireland – 3		Sweden – 0	
Player	Score	Player	Score
Philip Walton	72	Mats Lanner	74
Peter Senior	73	Dave Barr	73
Greg Norman	74	Richard Zokol	74

Scotland – 1		England – 2	
Player	Score	Player	Score
Sam Torrance	69	Howard Clark	67
Gordon Brand Jnr	74	Denis Durnian	78
Sandy Lyle	70	Mark James	70

James won on first playoff hole.

=== Semi-finals ===
United States – 2		Ireland – 1	
Player	Score	Player	Score
Mark Calcavecchia	69	Philip Walton	74
Tom Kite	72	Ronan Rafferty	74
Curtis Strange	74	Christy O'Connor Jnr	74

Strange won on first playoff hole.

England – 1		Japan – 2	
Player	Score	Player	Score
Denis Durnian	72	Naomichi Ozaki	70
Howard Clark	70	Koichi Suzuki	66
Mark James	74	Hajime Meshiai	73

=== Final ===
United States – 3.5		Japan – 2.5	
Player	Score	Player	Score
Mark Calcavecchia	67	Hajime Meshiai	68
Tom Kite	68	Naomichi Ozaki	68
Curtis Strange	72	Koichi Suzuki	75
Mark Calcavecchia	66	Hajime Meshiai	73
Tom Kite	74	Koichi Suzuki	74
Curtis Strange	74	Naomichi Ozaki	69

=== Third place ===
Ireland – 1		England – 2	
Player	Score	Player	Score
Philip Walton	71	Denis Durnian	72
Ronan Rafferty	75	Howard Clark	72
Christy O'Connor Jnr	76	Mark James	69

== Team results ==
Country	Place	W	L	Seed
United States	1	10.5	4.5	1
Japan	2	9.5	5.5	7
Ireland	3	7	5	5
England	4	7	5	6
Scotland	T5	3	3	3
Argentina	T5	2.5	3.5	
France	T5	2	4	
Sweden	T5	2	4	
Australia	T9	1	2	2
Canada	T9	1	2	
Italy	T9	1	2	
New Zealand	T9	1	2	
South Korea	T9	1	2	
Spain	T9	1	2	4
Taiwan	T9	1	2	
Wales	T9	0.5	2.5	8

== Player results ==
Country	Player	W	L
United States	Mark Calcavecchia	4	1
United States	Curtis Strange	4	1
United States	Tom Kite	2.5	2.5
Japan	Naomichi Ozaki	4.5	0.5
Japan	Koichi Suzuki	4	1
Japan	Hajime Meshiai	1	4
Ireland	Philip Walton	3	1
Ireland	Christy O'Connor Jnr	2	2
Ireland	Ronan Rafferty	2	2
England	Howard Clark	3	1
England	Mark James	3	1
England	Denis Durnian	1	3
Scotland	Gordon Brand Jnr	1	1
Scotland	Sandy Lyle	1	1
Scotland	Sam Torrance	1	1
Argentina	Miguel Fernández	1	1
Argentina	Eduardo Romero	1	1
Argentina	Vicente Fernández	0.5	1.5
France	Emmanuel Dussart	1	1
France	Marc Pendariès	1	1
France	Géry Watine	0	2
Sweden	Magnus Persson	1	1
Sweden	Ove Sellberg	1	1
Sweden	Mats Lanner	0	2
Australia	Greg Norman	0	1
Australia	Ian Baker-Finch	0	1
Australia	Wayne Grady	1	0
Canada	Dave Barr	1	0
Canada	Dan Halldorson	0	1
Canada	Richard Zokol	0	1
Italy	Alberto Binaghi	1	0
Italy	Costantino Rocca	0	1
Italy	Massimo Mannelli	0	1
New Zealand	Simon Owen	1	0
New Zealand	Frank Nobilo	0	1
New Zealand	Grant Waite	0	1
South Korea	Park Nam-Sin	1	0
South Korea	Choi Sang-Ho	0	1
South Korea	Choi Yoon-Soo	0	1
Spain	José María Olazábal	1	0
Spain	José María Cañizares	0	1
Spain	José Rivero	0	1
Taiwan	Yu Chin-Han	1	0
Taiwan	Hsieh Chin-sheng	0	1
Taiwan	Lu Chien-soon	0	1
Wales	Mark Mouland	0.5	0.5
Wales	Philip Parkin	0	1
Wales	Ian Woosnam	0	1
