= Richard Boxall =

English golfer (born 1961)

Personal information
- Full name: Richard Boxall
- Nationality: England
- Born: 28 April 1961 (age 65) Hampton Wick, Middlesex, England
- Height: 5 ft 11.5 in (1.82 m)
- Weight: 196 lb (89 kg; 14.0 st)

Career
- Sport: Golf
- Turned professional: 1982
- Former tour: European Tour
- Professional wins: 2

Number of wins by tour
- European Tour: 1
- Other: 1

Best results in major championships
- Masters Tournament: DNP
- PGA Championship: DNP
- U.S. Open: DNP
- The Open Championship: T44: 1996

Richard Boxall (born 28 April 1961) is an English professional golfer.

== Professional career ==
In 1982, Boxall turned professional. He won a place on the European Tour at that year's final qualifying school. He played on the Tour until 2000, and won one Tour event, the 1990 Lancia Martini Italian Open. He also had his best finish on the Order of Merit that year, placing seventeenth. He represented England in the Alfred Dunhill Cup and the World Cup of Golf in 1990.

During the third round of The Open Championship at Royal Birkdale in 1991, Boxall was just two strokes off the lead when he suffered a stress fracture of his left leg while playing his tee shot on the ninth hole. He was out of action for nine months.

Boxall now works as a golf commentator, mainly on Sky Sports coverage of the European Tour. He started on the BBC.

== Professional wins (2) ==
=== European Tour wins (1) ===
| No. | Date | Tournament | Winning score | Margin of victory | Runner-up |
|---|---|---|---|---|---|
| 1 | 20 May 1990 | Lancia Martini Italian Open | −21 (65-64-70-68=267) | 5 strokes | (Spain) José María Olazábal |

European Tour playoff record (0–1)

| No. | Year | Tournament | Opponents | Result |
|---|---|---|---|---|
| 1 | 1990 | Vinho Verde Atlantic Open | (Northern Ireland) Stephen Hamill, (Scotland) Stephen McAllister, (Northern Ireland) Ronan Rafferty, (Denmark) Anders Sørensen, (England) David Williams | McAllister won with par on first extra hole |

=== Other wins (1) ===
- 1995 J. P. McManus Pro-Am (shared title with Paul Broadhurst)

== Results in major championships ==
| Tournament | 1980 | 1981 | 1982 | 1983 | 1984 | 1985 | 1986 | 1987 | 1988 | 1989 | 1990 | 1991 | 1992 | 1993 | 1994 | 1995 | 1996 | 1997 |
|---|---|---|---|---|---|---|---|---|---|---|---|---|---|---|---|---|---|---|
| The Open Championship | CUT | | | CUT | T52 | | CUT | | | T52 | CUT | WD | CUT | CUT | | CUT | T44 | T48 |

Note: Boxall only played in The Open Championship.

Did not play

CUT = missed the half-way cut
WD = withdrew
"T" = tied

== Team appearances ==
Amateur

- European Youths' Team Championship (representing England): 1982,

Professional

- Dunhill Cup (representing England): 1990
- World Cup (representing England): 1990
