= 1990 Dunhill Cup =

Coordinates: 56.351484°N 2.816147°W

Tournament information
- Dates: 11–14 October
- Location: St Andrews, Scotland
- Course: Old Course at St Andrews
- Format: Match play

Statistics
- Par: 72
- Length: 6,933 yards (6,340 m)
- Field: 16 teams of 3 players
- Prize fund: US$1,000,000
- Winner's share: US$300,000

Champion
- Ireland (David Feherty, Ronan Rafferty, Philip Walton)

The 1990 Dunhill Cup was the sixth Dunhill Cup. It was a team tournament featuring 16 countries, each represented by three players. The Cup was played 11–14 October at the Old Course at St Andrews in Scotland. The sponsor was the Alfred Dunhill company. The Irish team of David Feherty, Ronan Rafferty, Philip Walton beat the English team of Richard Boxall, Howard Clark, and Mark James in the final. It was the second win in the Dunhill Cup for Ireland. (As in the World Cup, Ireland was represented by a combined Ireland and Northern Ireland team.)

== Format ==
The Cup was played as a single-elimination, match play event played over four days. The top eight teams were seeded with the remaining teams randomly placed in the bracket. In each match, the three players were paired with their opponents and played 18 holes at medal match play. Tied matches were extended to a sudden-death playoff only if they affected the outcome between the two teams.

== Bracket ==
First round
1	United States	0.5
France	2.5
8	Japan	2
Argentina	1
5	England	3
Thailand	0
4	Scotland	2.5
Mexico	0.5
2	Australia	1
New Zealand	2
7	Wales	2
Taiwan	1
6	Spain	2
Sweden	1
3	Ireland	3
South Korea	0

Quarter-finals
France	0
8	Japan	3
5	England	2
4	Scotland	1
New Zealand	2
7	Wales	1
6	Spain	1
3	Ireland	2

Semi-finals
8	Japan	1
5	England	2
New Zealand	0.5
3	Ireland	2.5

Final
5	England	2.5
3	Ireland	3.5
Third place
8	Japan	1
New Zealand	2

== Round by round scores ==
=== First round ===
Japan – 2		Argentina – 1	
Player	Score	Player	Score
Satoshi Higashi	68	Miguel Guzmán	70
Yoshinori Kaneko	72	Vicente Fernández	73
Hajime Meshiai	76	Eduardo Romero	73

United States – 0.5		France – 2.5	
Player	Score	Player	Score
Mark Calcavecchia	73	Marc Farry	70
Curtis Strange	69	Jean van de Velde	69
Tom Kite	74	Emmanuel Dussart	73

Spain – 2		Sweden – 1	
Player	Score	Player	Score
Miguel Ángel Jiménez	67	Ove Sellberg	72
José Rivero	69	Magnus Persson	72
José María Cañizares	71	Mats Lanner	68

England – 3		Thailand – 0	
Player	Score	Player	Score
Richard Boxall	74	Sukree Onsham	77
Howard Clark	68	Suthep Meesawat	78
Mark James	70	Boonchu Ruangkit	79

Scotland – 2.5		Mexico – 0.5	
Player	Score	Player	Score
Sandy Lyle	68	Rafael Alarcón	73
Stephen McAllister	73	Enrique Serna	77
Sam Torrance	69	Carlos Espinoza	69

Ireland – 3		South Korea – 0	
Player	Score	Player	Score
Ronan Rafferty	70	Choi Sang-Ho	73
Philip Walton	71	Park Nam-Sin	74
David Feherty	69	Choi Yoon-Soo	81

Wales – 2		Taiwan – 1	
Player	Score	Player	Score
Ian Woosnam	71	Hsieh Yu-shu	78
Mark Mouland	73	Chen Liang-hsi	72
Philip Parkin	77	Kuo Chie-Hsiung	78

Australia – 1		New Zealand – 2	
Player	Score	Player	Score
Greg Norman	76	Frank Nobilo	67
Wayne Grady	78	Simon Owen	74
Rodger Davis	66	Greg Turner	75

=== Quarter-finals ===
Japan – 3		France – 0	
Player	Score	Player	Score
Satoshi Higashi	71	Marc Farry	80
Yoshinori Kaneko	71	Jean van de Velde	75
Hajime Meshiai	70	Emmanuel Dussart	70

Ireland – 2		Spain – 1	
Player	Score	Player	Score
David Feherty	76	Miguel Ángel Jiménez	77
Ronan Rafferty	71	José María Cañizares	70
Philip Walton	70	José Rivero	82

Wales – 1		New Zealand – 2	
Player	Score	Player	Score
Ian Woosnam	67	Frank Nobilo	70
Mark Mouland	76	Simon Owen	71
Philip Parkin	75	Greg Turner	74

Scotland – 1		England – 2	
Player	Score	Player	Score
Stephen McAllister	75	Richard Boxall	73
Sandy Lyle	75	Howard Clark	77
Sam Torrance	73	Mark James	72

=== Semi-finals ===
Ireland – 2.5		New Zealand – 0.5	
Player	Score	Player	Score
Philip Walton	70	Simon Owen	71
Ronan Rafferty	68	Frank Nobilo	68
David Feherty	68	Greg Turner	69

England – 2		Japan – 1	
Player	Score	Player	Score
Howard Clark	70	Satoshi Higashi	70
Richard Boxall	70	Yoshinori Kaneko	69
Mark James	70	Hajime Meshiai	70

Clark won on first playoff hole.
James won on fourth playoff hole.

=== Final ===
Ireland – 3.5		England – 2.5	
Player	Score	Player	Score
Philip Walton	72	Mark James	72
Ronan Rafferty	71	Richard Boxall	73
David Feherty	74	Howard Clark	73
Philip Walton	77	Mark James	76
Ronan Rafferty	71	Richard Boxall	77
David Feherty	75	Howard Clark	75

Feherty won on third playoff hole.

=== Third place ===
Japan – 1		New Zealand – 2	
Player	Score	Player	Score
Satoshi Higashi	75	Greg Turner	72
Yoshinori Kaneko	74	Simon Owen	77
Hajime Meshiai	77	Frank Nobilo	73

== Team results ==
Country	Place	W	L	Seed
Ireland	1	11	4	3
England	2	9.5	5.5	5
New Zealand	3	6.5	5.5	
Japan	4	7	5	8
Scotland	T5	3.5	2.5	4
Spain	T5	3	3	6
Wales	T5	3	3	7
France	T5	2.5	3.5	
Argentina	T9	1	2	
Australia	T9	1	2	2
Sweden	T9	1	2	
Taiwan	T9	1	2	
Mexico	T9	0.5	2.5	
United States	T9	0.5	2.5	1
South Korea	T9	0	3	
Thailand	T9	0	3	

== Player results ==
Country	Player	W	L
Ireland	David Feherty	4	1
Ireland	Ronan Rafferty	3.5	1.5
Ireland	Philip Walton	3.5	1.5
England	Mark James	4.5	0.5
England	Howard Clark	3	2
England	Richard Boxall	2	3
New Zealand	Frank Nobilo	2.5	1.5
New Zealand	Simon Owen	2	2
New Zealand	Greg Turner	2	2
Japan	Yoshinori Kaneko	4	0
Japan	Satoshi Higashi	2	2
Japan	Hajime Meshiai	1	3
Scotland	Sandy Lyle	2	0
Scotland	Stephen McAllister	1	1
Scotland	Sam Torrance	0.5	1.5
Spain	José María Cañizares	1	1
Spain	Miguel Ángel Jiménez	1	1
Spain	José Rivero	1	1
Wales	Ian Woosnam	2	0
Wales	Philip Parkin	1	1
Wales	Mark Mouland	0	2
France	Emmanuel Dussart	1	1
France	Marc Farry	1	1
France	Jean van de Velde	0.5	1.5
Argentina	Eduardo Romero	1	0
Argentina	Vicente Fernández	0	1
Argentina	Miguel Guzmán	0	1
Australia	Rodger Davis	1	0
Australia	Wayne Grady	0	1
Australia	Greg Norman	0	1
Sweden	Mats Lanner	1	0
Sweden	Magnus Persson	0	1
Sweden	Ove Sellberg	0	1
Taiwan	Chen Liang-hsi	1	0
Taiwan	Hsieh Yu-shu	0	1
Taiwan	Kuo Chie-Hsiung	0	1
Mexico	Carlos Espinoza	0.5	0.5
Mexico	Rafael Alarcón	0	1
Mexico	Enrique Serna	0	1
United States	Curtis Strange	0.5	0.5
United States	Mark Calcavecchia	0	1
United States	Tom Kite	0	1
South Korea	Choi Sang-Ho	0	1
South Korea	Choi Yoon-Soo	0	1
South Korea	Park Nam-Sin	0	1
Thailand	Suthep Meesawat	0	1
Thailand	Sukree Onsham	0	1
Thailand	Boonchu Ruangkit	0	1
