= 1990 World Cup (men's golf) =

Tournament information
- Dates: November 21–24
- Location: Orlando, Florida, U.S. 28.427515°N 81.468462°W
- Course: Grand Cypress Resort Golf
- Format: 72 holes stroke play combined score

Statistics
- Par: 72
- Length: 6,751 yards (6,173 m)
- Field: 32 two-man teams
- Cut: None
- Prize fund: US$1.1 million
- Winner's share: $240,000 team $75,000 individual

Champion
- Germany; Torsten Giedeon & Bernhard Langer
- 556 (−20)

Location map
- Location in the United States Location in Florida

The 1990 World Cup took place at the Grand Cypress Resort Golf Club in Orlando, Florida, United States. It was the 36th World Cup event. The tournament was a 72-hole stroke play team event with 32 teams. Each team consisted of two players from a country. The combined score of each team determined the team results. The German team of Bernhard Langer and Torsten Giedeon won by three strokes over the England team of Mark James and Richard Boxall and the Ireland team of David Feherty and Ronan Rafferty in a share of second place. The victory was the first international sports victory for the united country of Germany, since the reunification of East and West Germany a month earlier. The individual competition was won by Payne Stewart, United States.

== Teams ==
Country	Players
Argentina	Luis Carbonetti and Miguel Guzmán
Australia	Brian Jones and Peter Senior
Bermuda	Dwayne Pearman and Keith Smith
Brazil	Jorge Pedro Acacio and Rafael Navarro
Canada	Dave Barr and Rick Gibson
Chinese Taipei	Chen Liang-hsi and Yuan Ching-Chi
Czechoslovakia	Miroslav Nemec and Jiri Zavazal
Colombia	Juan Pinzon and Ivan Rengifo
Denmark	Anders Sørensen and Steen Tinning
England	Richard Boxall and Mark James
Fiji	Vilikesa Kalou and Manoa Rosigatale
France	Emmanuel Dussart and Jean van de Velde
Germany	Torsten Giedeon and Bernhard Langer
Iceland	Sigurjón Arnarsson (a) and Úlfar Jónsson (a)
Ireland	David Feherty and Ronan Rafferty
Italy	Alberto Binaghi and Costantino Rocca
Jamaica	Christian Bernard and Seymour Rose
Japan	Katsuyoshi Tomori and Tadami Ueno
Mexico	Carlos Pelaez and Carlos Espinoza
Netherlands	Ruud Bos and Chris van de Velde
New Zealand	Frank Nobilo and Greg Turner
Philippines	Frankie Miñoza and Robert Pactolerin
Puerto Rico	Julio Martinez (am) and Jesus Rodriguez
Scotland	Gordon Brand Jnr and Sam Torrance
Singapore	Samson Gimson and Bill Fung Hee Kwan
South Korea	Choi Sang-ho and Park Nam-sin
Spain	Miguel Ángel Jiménez and José Rivero
Sweden	Mats Lanner and Magnus Persson
Switzerland	André Bossert and Paolo Quirici
Thailand	Sangh Sangsui and Thaworn Wiratchant
United States	Jodie Mudd and Payne Stewart
Wales	Mark Mouland and Ian Woosnam

(a) denotes amateur

== Scores ==
Team

Place	Country	Score	To par	Money (US$) (per team)
1	Germany	141-142-132-141=556	−20	240,000
T2	England	136-140-138-145=559	−17	104,000
T2	Ireland	142-142-140-135=559	−17	104,000
4	Wales	140-145-133-143=561	−15	64,000
5	United States	138-140-141-143=562	−14	50,000
T6	Argentina	138-143-141-144=566	−10	31,333
T6	Australia	143-145-138-140=566	−10	31,333
T6	Spain	137-140-145-144=566	−10	31,333
9	Canada	142-139-144-145=570	−6	18,000
T10	Chinese Taipei	145-147-140-139=571	−5	14,000
T10	Mexico	145-147-141-138=571	−5	14,000
T10	Scotland	138-146-140-147=571	−5	14,000
13	Denmark	144-137-145-146=572	−4	10,000
T14	New Zealand	142-146-147-140=575	−1	7,500
T14	South Korea	141-150-139-145=575	−1	7,500
16	Switzerland	145-143-144-146=578	+2	7,000
17	Sweden	141-147-146-145=579	+3	7,000
18	France	145-148-143-145=581	+5	7,000
19	Netherlands	150-149-145-138=582	+6	7,000
20	Italy	148-143-151-145=587	+11	7,000
21	Thailand	139-150-144-156=588	+12	7,000
22	Japan	153-145-142-150=590	+14	7,000
23	Colombia	151-150-147-146=594	+18	7,000
24	Philippines	153-154-145-145=597	+21	7,000
T25	Brazil	150-155-147-151=603	+27	7,000
T25	Iceland (Note: No prize money received as both team members were amateurs.)	156-151-146-150=603	+27	7,000
27	Bermuda	150-159-157-154=620	+44	7,000
28	Singapore	154-163-152-153=622	+46	7,000
29	Jamaica	148-154-167-154=623	+47	7,000
30	Puerto Rico (Note: Half the listed prize money received as one team member was an amateur.)	161-151-158-160=630	+54	7,000
31	Fiji	160-158-166-151=635	+59	7,000
32	Czechoslovakia	164-171-162-170=667	+91	7,000

International Trophy

Place	Player	Country	Score	To par	Money (US$)
1	Payne Stewart	United States	69-68-68-66=271	−17	75,000
2	Anders Sørensen	Denmark	67-67-70-69=273	−15	50,000
T3	David Feherty	Ireland	70-73-70-63=276	−12	35,000
T3	Ian Woosnam	Wales	72-69-65-70=276	−12	35,000
T5	Torsten Giedeon	Germany	70-71-65-72=278	−10	17,500
T5	Bernhard Langer	Germany	71-71-67-69=278	−10	17,500
7	Mark James	England	68-71-68-72=279	−9	
T8	Richard Boxall	England	68-69-70-73=280	−8	
T8	Miguel Guzmán	Argentina	69-72-67-72=280	−8	
T8	Peter Senior	Australia	68-71-70-71=280	−8	
