= Philip Walton =

Irish professional golfer (born 1962)

Personal information
- Full name: Philip Joseph Walton
- Nationality: Ireland
- Born: 28 March 1962 (age 64) Dublin, Ireland
- Height: 5 ft 10 in (1.78 m)

Career
- Sport: Golf
- College: Oklahoma State University
- Turned professional: 1983
- Current tour: Champions Tour
- Former tour: European Tour
- Professional wins: 7
- Highest ranking: 78 (15 July 1990)

Number of wins by tour
- European Tour: 3

Best results in major championships
- Masters Tournament: DNP
- PGA Championship: T39: 1995
- U.S. Open: T97: 1996
- The Open Championship: T13: 1989

Philip Joseph Walton (born 28 March 1962) is an Irish professional golfer.

== Amateur career ==
According to Ronan Rafferty, Walton had the best handicap in the Republic of Ireland as an amateur. Walton attended Oklahoma State University in the United States and played for Great Britain & Ireland in the Walker Cup in 1981 and 1983.

== Professional career ==
Walton turned professional in 1983 and spent many years on the European Tour, making the top one hundred on the Order of Merit every year from 1983 to 1998, with a best ranking of thirteenth in 1995. He won three European Tour events and four Irish PGA Championships.

Walton has represented Ireland or Great Britain & Ireland on many occasions. He was a member of the winning Irish team at the 1990 Alfred Dunhill Cup. He made his only Ryder Cup appearance for Europe in 1995 at Oak Hill, where he beat Jay Haas on the final green of the crucial penultimate singles match.

Walton came through local qualifying to earn his place at the 2008 Open Championship at Royal Birkdale, his first major since 1998.

== Amateur wins ==
- 1981 Scottish Amateur Stroke Play Championship, Spanish International Amateur Championship
- 1982 Irish Amateur Close Championship

== Professional wins (7) ==
=== European Tour wins (3) ===
No.	Date	Tournament	Winning score	Margin of victory	Runner-up
1	1 Jul 1990	Peugeot Open de France	−5 (73-66-67-69=275)	Playoff	(West Germany) Bernhard Langer
2	17 Apr 1995	Open Catalonia	−7 (68-74-71-68=281)	3 strokes	(Scotland) Andrew Coltart
3	4 Jun 1995	Murphy's English Open	−14 (65-70-69-70=274)	Playoff	(Scotland) Colin Montgomerie

European Tour playoff record (2–1)

No.	Year	Tournament	Opponent	Result
1	1989	Carroll's Irish Open	(Wales) Ian Woosnam	Lost to birdie on second extra hole
2	1990	Peugeot Open de France	(West Germany) Bernhard Langer	Won with par on second extra hole
3	1995	Murphy's English Open	(Scotland) Colin Montgomerie	Won with birdie on second extra hole

=== Other wins (4) ===
- 1987 Irish PGA Championship
- 1989 Irish PGA Championship
- 1991 Irish PGA Championship
- 1995 Irish PGA Championship

== Results in major championships ==
Tournament	1981	1982	1983	1984	1985	1986	1987	1988	1989
U.S. Open									
The Open Championship	CUT				CUT	CUT	T50	T52	T13
PGA Championship									

Tournament	1990	1991	1992	1993	1994	1995	1996	1997	1998	1999
U.S. Open							T97			
The Open Championship	CUT	CUT	CUT			WD	CUT		T38	
PGA Championship						T39	CUT			

Tournament	2000	2001	2002	2003	2004	2005	2006	2007	2008
U.S. Open									
The Open Championship									CUT
PGA Championship									

Note: Walton never played in the Masters Tournament.

Did not play

CUT = missed the half-way cut (3rd round cut in 1981 Open Championship)
WD = withdrew
"T" = tied

== Team appearances ==
Amateur

- European Youths' Team Championship (representing Ireland): 1979 (winners), 1980, 1981
- Walker Cup (representing Great Britain & Ireland): 1981, 1983
- European Amateur Team Championship (representing Ireland): 1981, 1983
- Eisenhower Trophy (representing Great Britain & Ireland): 1982
- St Andrews Trophy (representing Great Britain & Ireland): 1982

Professional

- Europcar Cup (representing Ireland): 1988
- Dunhill Cup (representing Ireland): 1989, 1990 (winners), 1992, 1994, 1995
- Ryder Cup (representing Europe): 1995 (winners)
  - Record (W–L–H) 1–1–0 = 1 pt
- World Cup (representing Ireland): 1995
