= 1982 Eisenhower Trophy =

Coordinates: 46.561°N 6.676°E

Tournament information
- Dates: 15–18 September
- Location: Lausanne, Switzerland
- Course: Golf Club de Lausanne
- Format: 72 holes stroke play

Statistics
- Par: 72
- Length: 6,890 yards (6,300 m)
- Field: 30 teams 120 players

Champion
- United States; Nathaniel Crosby, Jim Holtgrieve, Bob Lewis & Jay Sigel
- 859 (−5)

The 1982 Eisenhower Trophy took place 15 to 18 September at the Golf Club de Lausanne in Lausanne, Switzerland. It was the 13th World Amateur Team Championship for the Eisenhower Trophy. The tournament was a 72-hole stroke play team event with 30 four-man teams. The best three scores for each round counted towards the team total.

United States won the Eisenhower Trophy for the ninth time, finishing seven strokes ahead of the joint silver medalists, Japan and Sweden, with France finishing fourth. Luis Carbonetti, representing Argentina, had the lowest individual score, 4-under-par 284, a stroke better than Jay Sigel.

The event was affected by political protests about the participation of South Africa. Two of the stronger nations, Australia and Canada, did not compete while teams from Indonesia and Trinidad and Tobago attended the opening ceremony but later withdrew.

== Teams ==
30 four-man teams contested the event.

The following table lists the players on the leading teams.

| Country | Players |
|---|---|
| Chinese Taipei | Lai Chen-jen, Li Wen-sheng, Lin Chie-hsiang, Yuan Ching-chi |
| France | Alexis Godillot, Marc Pendariès, Philippe Ploujoux, Jean-Louis Schneider |
| Great Britain & Ireland | George Macgregor, Andrew Oldcorn, Arthur Pierse, Philip Walton |
| Italy | Mauro Bianco, Emanuele Bolognesi, Andrea Canessa, Lorenzo Silva |
| Japan | Kazuhiko Kato, Masayuki Naito, Kiyotaka Oie, Tetsuo Sakata |
| New Zealand | Phil Aickin, Michael Barltrop, Colin Taylor, Greg Turner |
| South Africa | Derek James, Neil James, Duncan Lindsay-Smith, David Suddards |
| Spain | José María Olazábal, Alejo Ollé, Ramón Taya, Alfonso Vidaor |
| Sweden | Per Andersson, Krister Kinell, Magnus Persson, Ove Sellberg |
| Switzerland | Michael Buchter, Markus Frank, Carlo Rampone, Johnny Storjohann |
| United States | Nathaniel Crosby, Jim Holtgrieve, Bob Lewis, Jay Sigel |
| West Germany | Thomas Hübner, Hans-Günter Reiter, Frank Schlig, Ulrich Schulte |

== Scores ==
| Place | Country | Score | To par |
|---|---|---|---|
| 1st place, gold medalist(s) | United States | 212-215-221-211=859 | −5 |
| 2nd place, silver medalist(s) | Japan | 214-215-223-214=866 | +2 |
| 2nd place, silver medalist(s) | Sweden | 221-214-218-213=866 | +2 |
| 4 | France | 221-218-218-217=874 | +10 |
| 5 | Chinese Taipei | 225-212-222-219=878 | +14 |
| 6 | South Africa | 222-220-220-217=879 | +15 |
| 7 | New Zealand | 221-219-225-216=881 | +17 |
| T8 | Great Britain & Ireland | 221-219-218-224=882 | +18 |
| T8 | West Germany | 220-224-216-222=882 | +18 |
| 10 | Switzerland | 220-225-218-221=884 | +20 |
| 11 | Spain | 217-225-223-223=888 | +24 |
| 12 | Italy | 225-216-227-221=889 | +25 |
| 13 | Philippines | 219-225-223-223=890 | +26 |
| 14 | Argentina | 222-221-224-226=893 | +29 |
| 15 | Denmark | 230-230-216-221=897 | +33 |
| 16 | Belgium | 223-226-231-224=904 | +40 |
| 17 | Mexico | 228-231-231-221=911 | +47 |
| 18 | Chile | 229-225-233-225=912 | +48 |
| T19 | South Korea | 228-228-236-223=915 | +51 |
| T19 | Norway | 218-238-227-232=915 | +51 |
| 21 | Austria | 229-235-221-232=917 | +53 |
| 22 | Netherlands | 227-234-228-231=920 | +56 |
| 23 | Brazil | 227-232-236-229=924 | +60 |
| T24 | Finland | 234-226-239-238=937 | +73 |
| T24 | Venezuela | 236-235-235-231=937 | +73 |
| 26 | Iceland | 249-233-236-242=960 | +96 |
| 27 | Hong Kong | 246-237-249-239=971 | +107 |
| 28 | Bermuda | 241-252-241-242=976 | +112 |
| 29 | Guatemala | 250-253-243-244=990 | +126 |
| 30 | Greece | 254-268-254-249=1025 | +161 |

== Individual leaders ==
There was no official recognition for the lowest individual scores.

| Place | Player | Country | Score | To par |
|---|---|---|---|---|
| 1 | Luis Carbonetti | Argentina | 69-69-74-72=284 | −4 |
| 2 | Jay Sigel | United States | 69-69-73-74=285 | −3 |
| T3 | Krister Kinell | Sweden | 72-70-75-70=287 | −1 |
| T3 | Jim Holtgrieve | United States | 70-73-71-73=287 | −1 |
| T3 | Kiyotaka Oie | Japan | 71-73-74-69=287 | −1 |
| T6 | Phil Aickin | New Zealand | 72-74-74-68=288 | E |
| T6 | Markus Frank | Switzerland | 73-70-72-73=288 | E |
| T6 | Ove Sellberg | Sweden | 73-73-72-70=288 | E |
| 9 | Kazuhiko Kato | Japan | 71-72-75-72=290 | +2 |
| T10 | Duncan Lindsay-Smith | South Africa | 76-72-72-71=291 | +3 |
| T10 | Frankie Miñoza | Philippines | 70-75-71-75=291 | +3 |
| T10 | Yuan Ching-chi | Chinese Taipei | 79-67-76-69=291 | +3 |
