= Alfred Dunhill Cup =

Tournament information
- Location: St Andrews, Fife, Scotland
- Established: 1985
- Course: Old Course at St Andrews
- Par: 72
- Tour: European Tour
- Format: Team
- Month played: September/October
- Final year: 2000

Final champion
- Spain (Jiménez, Martín, Olazábal)

The Alfred Dunhill Cup was a team golf tournament which ran from 1985 to 2000, sponsored by Alfred Dunhill Ltd. It was for three-man teams of professional golfers, one team representing each country, and was promoted as the "World Team Championship". It was a "special approved event" on the European Tour, which means that it was supported by the Tour, but the prize money did not count towards the Tour's Order of Merit. The host course was the Old Course at St Andrews in Scotland.

The stature of the members of the American team was variable as the Dunhill Cup clashed with a PGA Tour event, though the fact that it was played at "The Home of Golf" helped to attract some star names. The other countries were generally represented by their best three golfers, or nearly so.

The Dunhill Cup was in competition with the World Cup, a similar event for two-man teams. In 2000, the World Cup's status was enhanced by its inclusion in the World Golf Championships series, and in 2001 the promoters of the Alfred Dunhill Cup replaced it with the Alfred Dunhill Links Championship, which is a celebrity pro-am tournament and an official European Tour event.

== Format ==
The field was always 16 teams of three players each. From 1985 to 1991, they compete in a single-elimination tournament that included a third place match. Beginning in 1992, the format switched to group play followed by a single-elimination tournament. The first three days were round-robin play amongst four groups of four teams to determine the semi-finalists. The semi-finals and the final were both played on the Sunday and the third place match was eliminated. The tournament was always played using medal match play.

== Winners ==
Year	Country	Team
Dunhill Cup
1985	Australia	David Graham, Graham Marsh, Greg Norman
1986	Australia	Rodger Davis, David Graham, Greg Norman
1987	England	Gordon J. Brand, Howard Clark, Nick Faldo
1988	Ireland	Eamonn Darcy, Ronan Rafferty, Des Smyth
1989	United States	Mark Calcavecchia, Tom Kite, Curtis Strange
1990	Ireland	David Feherty, Ronan Rafferty, Philip Walton
1991	Sweden	Anders Forsbrand, Per-Ulrik Johansson, Mats Lanner
1992	England	David Gilford, Steven Richardson, Jamie Spence
1993	United States	Fred Couples, John Daly, Payne Stewart
1994	Canada	Dave Barr, Rick Gibson, Ray Stewart
1995	Scotland	Andrew Coltart, Colin Montgomerie, Sam Torrance
1996	United States	Phil Mickelson, Mark O'Meara, Steve Stricker
1997	South Africa	Ernie Els, David Frost, Retief Goosen
Alfred Dunhill Cup
1998	South Africa	Ernie Els, David Frost, Retief Goosen
1999	Spain	Sergio García, Miguel Ángel Jiménez, José María Olazábal
2000	Spain	Miguel Ángel Jiménez, Miguel Ángel Martín, José María Olazábal

== Results table ==
Country	Times played	Best finish	Players	'85	'86	'87	'88	'89	'90	'91	'92	'93	'94	'95	'96	'97	'98	'99	'00
United States	16	Win (x3)	24	2	4	3	T5	1	T9	T5	T3	1	2	T8	1	T3	T3	T9	T9
Australia	16	Win (x2)	16	1	1	4	2	T9	T9	T9	T3	T14	T5	T5	T5	T9	T3	2	T5
England	16	Win (x2)	21	T5	T9	1	4	4	2	T5	1	2	T3	T8	T8	T9	T9	T5	T13
Ireland	16	Win (x2)	9	T9	T5	T5	1	3	1	T5	T5	T3	T5	T3	T5	T9	T9	T5	T5
South Africa	10	Win (x2)	7							2	T11	T5	T3	T5	T3	1	1	T3	2
Spain	16	Win (x2)	11	T5	T9	T5	3	T9	T5	T9	T5	T5	T15	T3	T8	T9	2	1	1
Canada	11	Win	10	T9	T5	T5	T9	T9		T5	T5	T5	1	T8	T15				
Scotland	16	Win	9	3	3	2	T5	T5	T5	3	2	T10	T5	1	T15	T5	T5	T9	T9
Sweden	15	Win	13		T9	T9	T9	T5	T9	1	T5	T3	T9	T8	T3	2	T5	T3	T5
Japan	15	2nd (x2)	25	T5	2	T5	T5	2	4		T11	T10	T9	T15	T8	T13	T15	T5	T13
New Zealand	13	2nd	10	T5	T9	T9		T9	3		T5		T9	T8	2	T3	T5	T5	T9
Zimbabwe	10	2nd	7			T9	T9					T5	T5	2	T5	T5	T9	T9	T9
Argentina	8	T3	8		T5			T5	T9			T14		T8		T5	T9		T3
Wales	10	T3	8	4	T5		T5	T9	T5	4		T14		T5	T8				T3
France	11	T5 (x3)	15	T9		T9	T9	T5	T5		T14		T9			T5	T9	T15	T13
Germany	7	T5 (x3)	6								T5		T9	T8	T8	T13	T5		T5
Paraguay	4	T5	4							T9		T5	T15					T9	
India	2	T8	5												T8			T9	
Italy	7	T8	8		T9	T9		T9		T9	T11				T8			T9	
South Korea	7	T9 (x5)	10		T9			T9	T9	T9	T14					T13	T9		
Taiwan	8	T9 (x5)	15	T9				T9	T9	T9		T10	T9	T15		T13			
Philippines	3	T9 (x3)	6	T9		T9	T9												
Thailand	4	T9 (x3)	6				T9		T9	T9	T14								
Brazil	2	T9 (x2)	5	T9			T9												
Mexico	3	T9 (x2)	6			T9			T9			T10							
Denmark	1	T9	3				T9												
Hong Kong	1	T9	3	T9															
Indonesia	1	T9	3		T9														
Malaysia	1	T9	3			T9													
Nigeria	1	T9	3	T9															
Switzerland	1	T9	3							T9									
Zambia	1	T9	3		T9														
China	3	T13	4														T15	T15	T13
