= Open de Portugal =

Golf tournament

Coordinates: 37.1973°N 8.56731°W

Tournament information
- Location: Lisbon, Portugal
- Established: 1953
- Courses: PGA Aroeira (No. 1 Course)
- Par: 71
- Length: 6,769 yards (6,190 m)
- Tours: European Tour; Challenge Tour
- Format: Stroke play
- Prize fund: €300,000
- Month played: September

Tournament record score
- Aggregate: 256 Sebastian Friedrichsen (2026)
- To par: −28 as above

Current champion
- (Denmark) Sebastian Friedrichsen

Location map
- Location in Portugal

The Open de Portugal, previously the Portuguese Open, is an annual professional golf tournament, currently played on the Challenge Tour.

== History ==
It was first played in 1953, and was part of the European Tour's schedule from 1973 to 2010. After a hiatus, the tournament returned in 2017 as a dual-ranking event on both the European Tour and the second-tier Challenge Tour. Matt Wallace won the event claiming his first European Tour victory. Since 2017 it continued as Challenge Tour-only event. However, in 2020, as part of major changes to the season due to the COVID-19 pandemic, it returned to the European Tour schedule as a dual-ranking event. Garrick Higgo won the 2020 event for his maiden European Tour win.

In 2021, the event returned as a sole-sanctioned Challenge Tour event.

== Winners ==
| Year | Tour(s) (Note: CHA − Challenge Tour; EUR − European Tour.) | Winner | Score | To par | Margin of victory | Runner(s)-up | Venue |
Open de Portugal
| 2026 | CHA | (Denmark) Sebastian Friedrichsen | 256 | −28 | 3 strokes | (Scotland) Marc Warren | Aroeira (No. 1) |
| 2025 | CHA | (South Africa) J. C. Ritchie | 269 | −15 | 1 stroke | (Scotland) David Law | Royal Óbidos |
| 2024 | CHA | (United States) Matt Oshrine | 273 | −11 | 1 stroke | (Italy) Stefano Mazzoli | Royal Óbidos |
| 2023 | CHA | (England) Marco Penge | 272 | −16 | 4 strokes | (Italy) Lorenzo Scalise (United States) Julian Suri | Royal Óbidos |
| 2022 | CHA | (France) Pierre Pineau | 273 | −15 | Playoff | (France) Félix Mory (France) David Ravetto | Royal Óbidos |
| 2021 | CHA | (Germany) Marcel Schneider | 269 | −19 | 1 stroke | (France) Frédéric Lacroix | Royal Óbidos |
| 2020 | CHA, EUR | (South Africa) Garrick Higgo | 269 | −19 | 1 stroke | (Spain) Pep Anglès | Royal Óbidos |
| 2019 | CHA | (Poland) Adrian Meronk | 273 | −15 | 2 strokes | (Spain) Sebastián García Rodríguez | Morgado |
| 2018 | CHA | (Australia) Dimitrios Papadatos | 281 | −7 | 2 strokes | (Portugal) José-Filipe Lima (France) Antoine Rozner | Morgado |
| 2017 | CHA, EUR | (England) Matt Wallace | 271 | −21 | 3 strokes | (United States) Julian Suri | Morgado |
2011–2016: No tournament
Estoril Open de Portugal
| 2010 | EUR | (Denmark) Thomas Bjørn | 265 | −23 | 5 strokes | (Australia) Richard Green | Penha Longa |
| 2009 | EUR | (Northern Ireland) Michael Hoey | 277 | −7 | Playoff | (Spain) Gonzalo Fernández-Castaño | Oitavos Dunes |
| 2008 | EUR | (France) Grégory Bourdy | 266 | −18 | Playoff | (Scotland) Alastair Forsyth (England) David Howell | Oitavos Dunes |
| 2007 | EUR | (Spain) Pablo Martín (a) | 277 | −7 | 1 stroke | (France) Raphaël Jacquelin | Oitavos Golfe |
Algarve Open de Portugal Caixa Geral de Depositos
| 2006 | EUR | (England) Paul Broadhurst (2) | 271 | −17 | 1 stroke | (England) Anthony Wall | Le Meridien Penina |
Estoril Open de Portugal Caixa Geral de Depositos
| 2005 | EUR | (England) Paul Broadhurst | 271 | −13 | 1 stroke | (Scotland) Paul Lawrie | Oitavos Golfe |
Algarve Open de Portugal Caixa Geral de Depositos
| 2004 | EUR | (Spain) Miguel Ángel Jiménez | 272 | −16 | 2 strokes | (Australia) Terry Price | Le Meridien Penina |
Algarve Open de Portugal
| 2003 | EUR | (Sweden) Freddie Jacobson | 283 | −5 | 1 stroke | (England) Brian Davis (Wales) Jamie Donaldson (Wales) Bradley Dredge | Vale do Lobo |
| 2002 | EUR | (Sweden) Carl Pettersson | 142 (Note: Shortened to 36 holes due to strong winds.) | −2 | Playoff | (England) David Gilford | Vale do Lobo |
| 2001 | EUR | (Wales) Phillip Price (2) | 273 | −15 | 2 strokes | (Republic of Ireland) Pádraig Harrington (Germany) Sven Strüver | Quinta do Lago |
Algarve Portuguese Open
| 2000 | EUR | (Scotland) Gary Orr | 275 | −13 | 1 stroke | (Wales) Phillip Price | Le Meridien Penina |
| 1999 | EUR | (England) Van Phillips | 276 | −12 | Playoff | (England) John Bickerton | Le Meridien Penina |
Portuguese Open
| 1998 | EUR | (England) Peter Mitchell | 274 | −18 | 1 stroke | (England) David Gilford (Sweden) Jarmo Sandelin | Le Meridien Penina |
| 1997 | EUR | (Sweden) Michael Jonzon | 269 | −19 | 3 strokes | (Spain) Ignacio Garrido | Aroeira |
| 1996 | EUR | (Australia) Wayne Riley | 271 | −13 | 2 strokes | (England) Mark Davis (England) Martin Gates | Aroeira |
| 1995 | EUR | (Scotland) Adam Hunter | 277 | −11 | Playoff | (Northern Ireland) Darren Clarke | Penha Longa |
| 1994 | EUR | (Wales) Phillip Price | 278 | −6 | 4 strokes | (England) Paul Eales (England) David Gilford (South Africa) Retief Goosen | Penha Longa |
| 1993 | EUR | (England) David Gilford | 275 | −13 | Playoff | (Argentina) Jorge Berendt | Vila-Sol |
| 1992 | EUR | (Northern Ireland) Ronan Rafferty | 273 | −15 | 1 stroke | (Sweden) Anders Forsbrand | Vila-Sol |
| 1991 | EUR | (England) Steven Richardson | 283 | −5 | 3 strokes | (Argentina) Vicente Fernández | Estela |
Portuguese Open TPC
| 1990 | EUR | (England) Michael McLean | 274 | −14 | 1 stroke | (Scotland) Gordon Brand Jnr (Australia) Mike Harwood | Quinta do Lago |
| 1989 | EUR | (Scotland) Colin Montgomerie | 264 | −24 | 11 strokes | (Australia) Rodger Davis (Spain) Manuel Moreno (United States) Mike Smith | Quinta do Lago |
Portuguese Open
| 1988 | EUR | (Australia) Mike Harwood | 280 | −8 | 1 stroke | (Republic of Ireland) Eamonn Darcy | Quinta do Lago |
| 1987 | EUR | (England) Robert Lee | 195 (Note: Shortened to 54 holes due to weather.) | −12 | 1 stroke | (Scotland) Sam Torrance | Estoril |
| 1986 | EUR | (Zimbabwe) Mark McNulty | 270 | −18 | 4 strokes | (England) Ian Mosey | Quinta do Lago |
| 1985 | EUR | (England) Warren Humphreys | 279 | −9 | 1 stroke | (South Africa) Hugh Baiocchi | Quinta do Lago |
| 1984 | EUR | (Zimbabwe) Tony Johnstone | 274 | −14 | 3 strokes | (England) Michael King | Quinta do Lago |
| 1983 | EUR | (Scotland) Sam Torrance (2) | 286 | −2 | 3 strokes | (England) Chris Moody | Troia |
| 1982 | EUR | (Scotland) Sam Torrance | 207 | −12 | 4 strokes | (England) Nick Faldo | Penina |
1980–81: No tournament
| 1979 | EUR | (Scotland) Brian Barnes | 287 | −5 | 2 strokes | (Spain) Francisco Abreu | Vilamoura |
| 1978 | EUR | (England) Howard Clark | 291 | −1 | 1 stroke | (Scotland) Brian Barnes (South Africa) Simon Hobday | Penina |
| 1977 | EUR | (Spain) Manuel Ramos | 287 | −5 | 2 strokes | (South Africa) Hugh Baiocchi | Penina |
| 1976 | EUR | (Spain) Salvador Balbuena | 283 | −6 | 4 strokes | (Scotland) Sam Torrance | Quinta do Lago |
| 1975 | EUR | (United States) Hal Underwood | 292 | E | 3 strokes | (Argentina) Vicente Fernández | Penina |
| 1974 | EUR | (Wales) Brian Huggett | 272 | −4 | 4 strokes | (South Africa) John Fourie | Estoril |
| 1973 | EUR | (Spain) Jaime Benito | 294 | +2 | Playoff | (Scotland) Bernard Gallacher | Penina |
| 1972 | | (Spain) Germán Garrido | | | | | Estoril |
| 1971 | | (England) Lionel Platts | | | | | Estoril |
| 1970 | | (Spain) Ramón Sota (3) | | | | | Estoril |
| 1969 | | (Spain) Ramón Sota (2) | 270 | | | (England) Jack Wilkshire | Estoril |
| 1968 | | (England) Max Faulkner | | | | | Estoril |
| 1967 | | (Spain) Ángel Gallardo | | | | | Estoril |
| 1966 | | (Italy) Alfonso Angelini (2) | | | | | Estoril |
1965: No tournament
| 1964 | | (Spain) Ángel Miguel (3) | | | | | Estoril |
| 1963 | | (Spain) Ramón Sota | | | | | Estoril |
| 1962 | | (Italy) Alfonso Angelini | | | | | Estoril |
| 1961 | | (England) Ken Bousfield (2) | | | | | Estoril |
| 1960 | | (England) Ken Bousfield | | | | | Estoril |
| 1959 | | (Spain) Sebastián Miguel | | | | | Estoril |
| 1958 | | (England) Peter Alliss | | | | | Estoril |
1957: No tournament
| 1956 | | (Spain) Ángel Miguel (2) | | | | | Estoril |
| 1955 | | (Belgium) Flory Van Donck | | | | | Estoril |
| 1954 | | (Spain) Ángel Miguel | | | | | Estoril |
| 1953 | | (Scotland) Eric Brown | | | | | Estoril |

== See also ==
- Open golf tournament
