= 2023 Senior Open Championship =

Tournament information
- Dates: 27–30 July 2023
- Location: Porthcawl, Wales, United Kingdom; 51.492°N 3.726°W
- Course: Royal Porthcawl Golf Club
- Organised by: The R&A
- Tours: European Senior Tour; PGA Tour Champions
- Format: 72 holes stroke play

Statistics
- Par: 71
- Length: 6,901 yd (6,310 m)
- Field: 144 players
- Cut: 147 (71 players)
- Prize fund: US$2,750,000 £2,200,000
- Winner's share: US$447,800 €407,630

Champion
- (Germany) Alex Čejka
- 289 (+5)

Location map
- Location in Europe Location on the British Isles Location in Wales

The 2023 Senior Open Championship was a senior major golf championship for players aged 50 and over and the 36th Senior Open Championship. It was held 27–30 July at Royal Porthcawl Golf Club in Porthcawl, Wales. It was the 20th Senior Open Championship played as a senior major championship. The presenting sponsor was Rolex.

== Venue ==
The club was founded in 1891 and moved to its present location in 1895.

The 2023 event was the third Senior Open Championship played at Royal Porthcawl. The club previously hosted the 2014 and 2017 Senior Open Championships, both won by Bernhard Langer. It has also been the venue for The Amateur Championship on six occasions and the Welsh Golf Classic on the European Tour in the early 1980s.

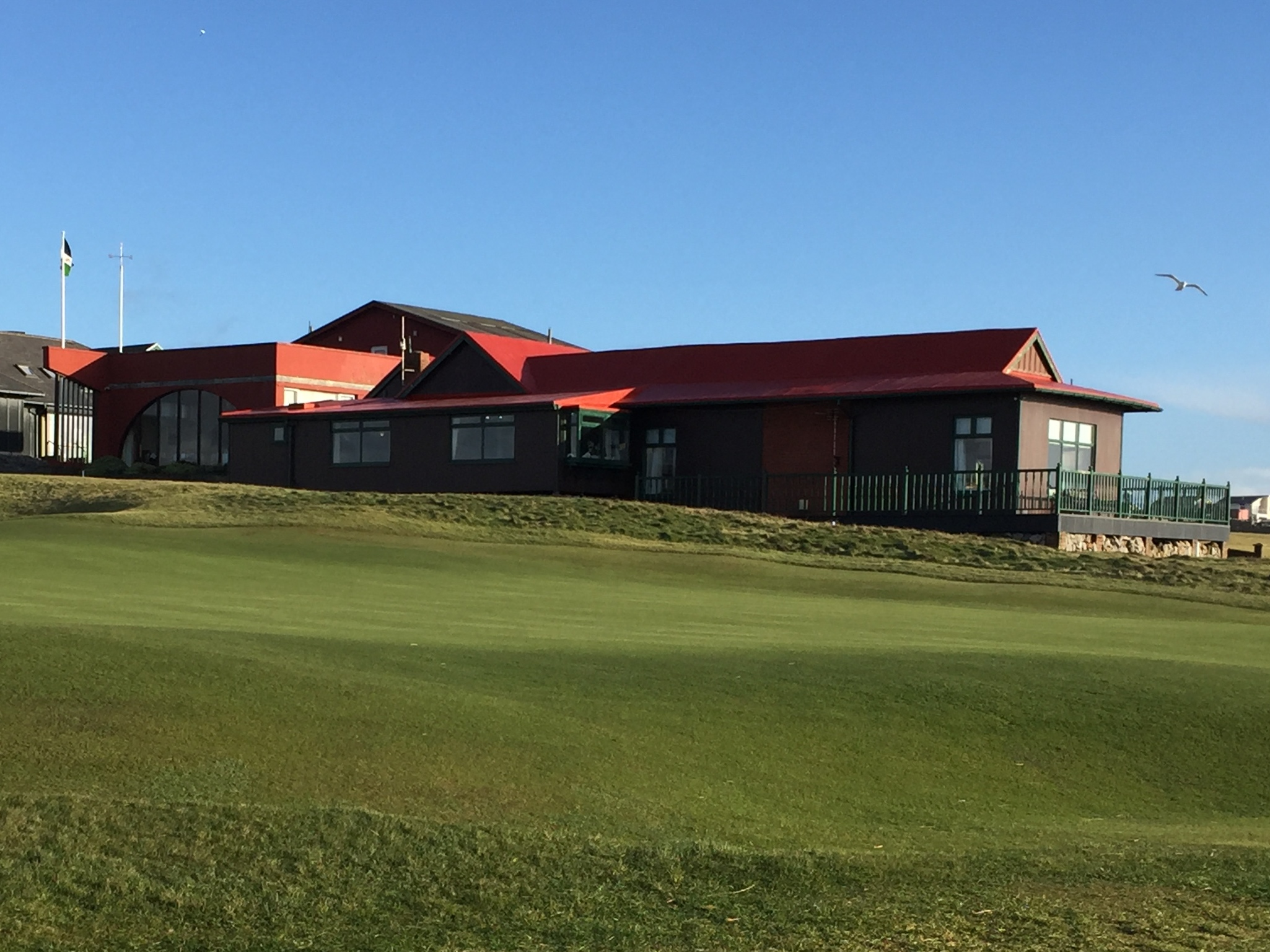
Royal Porthcawl Clubhouse

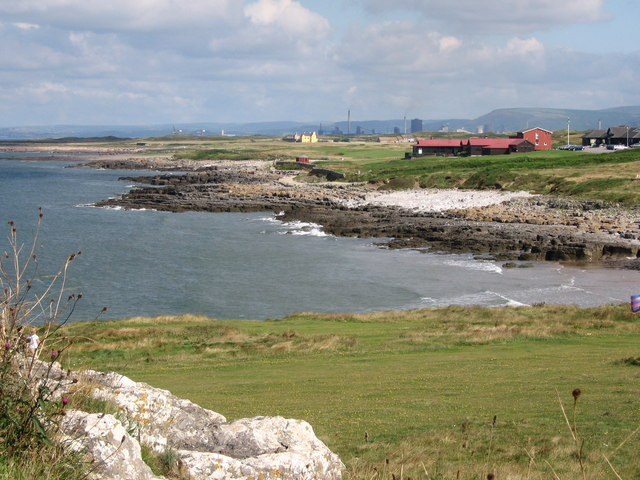
Royal Porthcawl Golf Club

=== Course layout ===
Hole	Yards	Par	Hole	Yards	Par
1	427	4	10	400	4
2	374	4	11	355	4
3	451	4	12	194	3
4	455	4	13	551	5
5	212	3	14	435	4
6	515	5	15	173	3
7	381	4	16	466	4
8	122	3	17	430	4
9	456	4	18	504	5
Out	3,393	35	In	3,508	36
Source:		Total		6,901	71

== Field ==
The field of 144 competitors included 136 professionals and eight amateurs, either exempt via different criteria or advancing from qualifying competitions.

For players who were not already exempt, four 18-hole stroke play qualifying events took place on Monday 24 July at four venues in Wales; Southerndown Golf Club, Pyle and Kenfig Golf Club (both in Bridgend), Machynys Peninsula Golf Club, Monk's Island, in Llanelli and Ashburnham Golf Club in Burry Port.

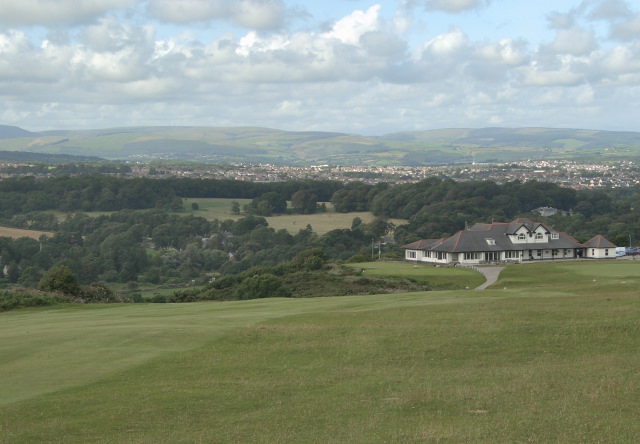
View from Southerndown golf course

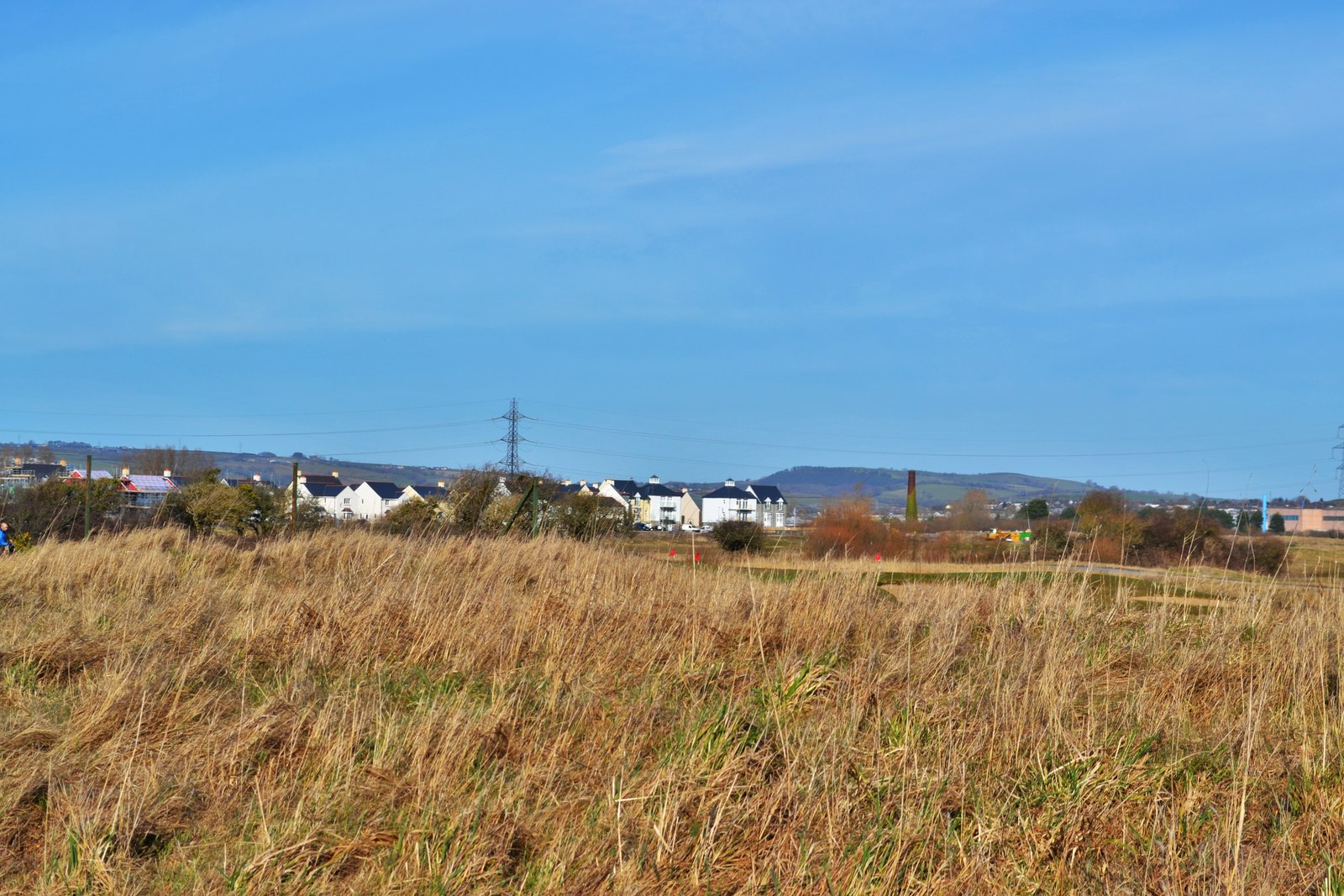
View from Machynys Golf Course

One 18-hole stroke play qualifying event took place on 10 July, at Firestone Country Club (Fazio Course), Akron, Ohio, United States.

35 places became available to players not qualified under the exemption categories. The qualifying event in United States received 1/5 of the places available. The remaining places were proportionately divided by the number of players taking part in each of the four qualifying events in Wales.

=== Exemption categories and exempt players ===
Each exemption category required players to have reached their 50th birthday on or before 27 July 2023. (Note: (a) – denotes amateur) (Note: Players who did not play in the championship, despite being qualified, written in italics.)

1. Former winners of The Senior Open aged 65 or under

- Bernhard Langer, Russ Cochran, Paul Broadhurst, Miguel Ángel Jiménez, Stephen Dodd, Darren Clarke
- Fred Couples, Mark Wiebe, Marco Dawson did not play

2. Former winners of the Masters Tournament, US PGA Championship, U.S. Open and The Open Championship aged 65 or under

- Ian Woosnam, José María Olazábal, Vijay Singh, Mike Weir, Pádraig Harrington, Rich Beem, Yang Yong-eun, Michael Campbell, Paul Lawrie
- Larry Mize, Sandy Lyle, Ángel Cabrera, Phil Mickelson, Hal Sutton, Bob Tway, Jeff Sluman, Wayne Grady, John Daly, Paul Azinger, Steve Elkington, Mark Brooks, Davis Love III, David Toms, Shaun Micheel, Lee Janzen, Corey Pavin, Steve Jones, Jim Furyk, Ernie Els, Retief Goosen, Mark Calcavecchia, Ian Baker-Finch, Tom Lehman, Justin Leonard, David Duval, Todd Hamilton, Stewart Cink did not play

3. Top 60 players on career money (including the Legends Tour, the European Tour and the Challenge Tour) list as of 3 July 2023

- Colin Montgomerie, Thomas Bjørn, Thongchai Jaidee, Anders Hansen, Niclas Fasth, Bradley Dredge, Richard Green, Philip Price, Thomas Levet, Peter O'Malley, Jeev Milkha Singh, Ricardo González, Simon Khan, Gary Orr, James Kingston, Mark McNulty, Peter Fowler, Jarmo Sandelin, Joakim Haeggman, Marcus Brier, Jean-François Remésy, Roger Chapman, Peter Baker, Jean van de Velde, Alex Čejka, Miguel Ángel Martín, Santiago Luna, Andrew Oldcorn, David Gilford
- Lee Westwood, (Note: Applications for entry from Lee Westwood and Richard Bland was denied due to outstanding fines to the European Tour.) Robert Karlsson, David Lynn, Sam Torrance, Nick O'Hern, Scott Hend, Andrew Coltart, John Bickerton, Peter Hedblom, Damien McGrane, Costantino Rocca, Mark James, Carl Mason, Pierre Fulke did not play

4. Top 60 players on the PGA Tour Champions all time money list as of 3 July 2023

- Jerry Kelly, K. J. Choi, Stuart Appleby, Jeff Maggert, Bob Estes, Billy Mayfair, Chris DiMarco, John Senden, Rod Pampling
- Steve Stricker did not play

5. The leading 20 players, not otherwise exempt on the closing date, on the Legends Tour Order of Merit for 2022

- Euan McIntosh, Phillip Archer, Emanuele Canonica, Michael Jonzon, Simon P. Brown, Clark Dennis, Steen Tinning, Christian Cévaër, Gary Wolstenholme, Andrew Raitt, Chris Williams, Michael Long, Paul Eales, Philip Golding, Thomas Gögele, David Shacklady, Paul Streeter, Gary Evans, Carl Suneson, José Manuel Carriles
- Paul McGinley did not play

6. The leading 20 players, not otherwise exempt on the closing date, on the Charles Schwab Cup points list for 2022

- David McKenzie, Scott Parel, Ken Duke, Tim Petrovic, Shane Bertsch, Rob Labritz, Scott Dunlap, Harrison Frazar, David Branshaw, Wes Short Jr., Glen Day, Mario Tiziani, Tom Gillis
- Brett Quigley did not play

7. Players finishing in positions 1-15, and those tying for 15th place, in The Senior Open 2022

- Mauricio Molina, Steven Alker, Charlie Wi
- Doug Barron did not play

8. Winners of official tournaments on the Legends Tour or PGA Tour Champions since The Senior Open 2022

- Adilson da Silva, Gary Marks

9. Winners of official tournaments on the European Tour or PGA Tour, when aged 50 years on 27 July 2023

- Raymond Russell, Jason Norris, Anthony Kang, Arjun Atwal, Chris Hanell, Jason Bohn, Robert Damron
- Jarrod Moseley, Stuart Cage, Yeh Wei-tze, Richard Bland, Chris Couch, Brian Bateman did not play

10. Past members of Ryder Cup or Presidents Cup teams aged 50 on 27 July 2023

- Notah Begay III

11. Former winners of the European Tour or PGA Tour Order of Merit aged 50–55 years on 27 July 2023

12. Winners of the US Senior Open 2018 – 2023

13. Winners of the Senior PGA Championship 2018 – 2023

- Ken Tanigawa

14. The leading 2 players, not otherwise exempt, in the top 10 of the Japan PGA Senior Tour money list for 2022

- Hiroyuki Fujita, Keiichiro Fukabori

15. The first 4 players, and those tying for 4th place, who are not otherwise exempt, in the top 30 of the current Legends Tour Order of Merit as of 24 July 2023

- Greig Hutcheon, Keith Horne, Patrik Sjöland, André Bossert

16. The first 4 players, and those tying for 4th place, who are not otherwise exempt, in the top 30 of the current Charles Schwab Cup money list as of 24 July 2023

17. The leading amateur in the 2022 Senior Open who completed 72 holes

- John Kemp (a)

18. The Senior Amateur champion for 2023

- Brent Paterson (a)

19. The US Senior Amateur champion for 2022

- Rusty Strawn (a)

20. The European Senior Men's Amateur champion for 2023

- Edward McCormack (a)

21. Special exemptions

=== Qualifying competitions and qualifiers ===
10 July 2023 at Firestone Country Club (Fazio Course), Akron, Ohio, United States

- Harold Wallace, Omar Uresti, Jesús Rivas, Michael Muehr, Esteban Toledo, Carlos Franco, Tim Weinhart

24 July 2023 at Southerndown Golf Club, Bridgend, Wales, Pyle and Kenfig Golf Club, Bridgend, Wales, Machynys Peninsula Golf Club, Monk's Island, Llanelli, Wales and Ashburnham Golf Club, Burry Port, Wales

- Fraser Mann, Timothy O'Neal, Doug McGuigan, Stephen Fenn, David Copsey, Grant Hamerton, Neil Thompson, Russell Humphrey (a), Jyoti Randhawa, Simon Griffiths, Joe Lyons (a), Knud Storgaard, Rafael Benitez, Victor Casado, Michele Reale, Rafa Barcellos, Jason Partridge, Eamonn O'Connor (a), Todd Sapere, Peter Wilson, Damian Mooney, John Balfanz, Scott Henderson, James Crampton (a), Gustavo Acosta, Øyvind Rojahn, Peter Martin, Richard Tinworth

== Round summaries ==
=== First round ===
Thursday, 27 July 2023

Place	Player	Score	To par
1	(Spain) Miguel Ángel Jiménez	66	−5
T2	(Germany) Alex Čejka	68	−3
T2	(United States) Mario Tiziani	68	−3
T3	(India) Jeev Milkha Singh	69	−2
T3	(Fiji) Vijay Singh	69	−2
T6	(New Zealand) Steven Alker	70	−1
T6	(England) Paul Broadhurst	70	−1
T6	(United States) Tom Gillis	70	−1
T6	(South Africa) Keith Horne	70	−1
T6	(Scotland) Paul Lawrie	70	−1
T6	(Sweden) Jarmo Sandelin	70	−1

=== Second round ===
Friday, 28 July 2023

Place	Player	Score	To par
1	(New Zealand) Steven Alker	70-68=138	−4
2	(Germany) Alex Čejka	68-71=139	−3
3	(Scotland) Greig Hutcheon	72-68=140	−2
T4	(England) Paul Broadhurst	70-71=141	−1
T4	(Denmark) Anders Hansen	72-69=141	−1
T4	(Scotland) Paul Lawrie	70-71=141	−1
T4	(Fiji) Vijay Singh	69-72=141	−1
T8	(United States) Shane Bertsch	73-69=142	E
T8	(Italy) Emanuele Canonica	72-70=142	E
T8	(South Africa) Keith Horne	70-72=142	E
T8	(Spain) Miguel Ángel Jiménez	66-76=142	E
T8	(Germany) Bernhard Langer	73-69=142	E
T8	(Spain) Santiago Luna	75-67=142	E
T8	(Scotland) Colin Montgomerie	72-70=142	E
T8	(Denmark) Steen Tinning	72-70=142	E

=== Third round ===
Saturday, 29 July 2023

Place	Player	Score	To par
1	(Germany) Alex Čejka	68-71-74=213	E
T3	(New Zealand) Steven Alker	70-68-76=214	+1
T3	(England) Phillip Archer	73-70-71=214	+1
T3	(Republic of Ireland) Pádraig Harrington	75-68-71=214	+1
T3	(Fiji) Vijay Singh	69-72-73=214	+1
T6	(Scotland) Greig Hutcheon	72-68-75=215	+2
T6	(United States) Jerry Kelly	73-71-71=215	+2
T8	(Australia) Richard Green	72-73-71=216	+3
T8	(Scotland) Paul Lawrie	70-71-75=216	+3
T8	(United States) Mario Tiziani	68-75-73=216	+3

=== Final round ===
Sunday, 30 July 2023

The final round was played in strong winds and recurring rain. Scores were significantly higher than in previous rounds. Pádraig Harrington, who finished second the year before, birdied his 72nd hole to tie the lead with his playing partner Alex Čejka after regulation play. A playoff, to start at 7 p.m. local time, was necessary to decide the winner. Defending champion Darren Clarke finished tied 33rd, ten shots behind the leaders. The only amateur to make the cut, John Kemp, finished tied 14th.

Place	Player	Score	To par	Money (€)
T1	(Germany) Alex Čejka	68-71-74-76=289	+5	Playoff
T1	(Republic of Ireland) Pádraig Harrington	75-68-71-75=289	+5	Playoff
3	(Fiji) Vijay Singh	69-72-73-77=291	+7	152,963
4	(Sweden) Michael Jonzon	72-72-71-75=292	+8	122,245
T5	(England) Phillip Archer	73-70-71-79=293	+9	94,538
T5	(Wales) Phillip Price	72-72-73-76=293	+9	94,538
T7	(Australia) Richard Green	72-73-71-78=294	+10	59,488
T7	(United States) Jerry Kelly	73-71-71-79=294	+10	59,488
T7	(Germany) Bernhard Langer	73-69-75-77=294	+10	59,488
T7	(Scotland) Euan McIntosh	74-71-72-77=294	+10	59,488

==== Playoff ====
Sunday, 30 July 2023

Alex Čejka and Pádraig Harrington went to a sudden death playoff, the 11th playoff in the history of the championship, playing the par-5 18th hole until one of the two players had a lower score than the other. On the first playoff hole Čejka reached the green in two while Harrington's second shot went slightly over the green, from where he choose to putt. Both players two-putted for easy birdies. On the second playoff hole Čejka reached the green in two again. Harrington's second shot rolled a few yards past the green. He missed his chip shot, which did not reach the green. From their positions, both players two-putted, why Čejka won by a shot and captured his first Senior Open Championship and third senior major championship.

Place	Player	Score	To par	Money (€)
1	(Germany) Alex Čejka	4-4=8	−2	407,631
2	(Republic of Ireland) Pádraig Harrington	4-5=9	−1	271,887

== Notes ==
Preceded by 2023 U.S. Senior Open	Senior Major Championships	Succeeded by 2024
