= 1995 European Tour =

Golf tour season

1995 European Tour season
- Duration: 19 January 1995 – 29 October 1995
- Number of official events: 36 (Note: One further tournament was scheduled but was cancelled.)
- Most wins: (Germany) Alex Čejka (3) (Germany) Bernhard Langer (3) (Scotland) Sam Torrance (3)
- Order of Merit: (Scotland) Colin Montgomerie
- Golfer of the Year: (Scotland) Colin Montgomerie
- Sir Henry Cotton Rookie of the Year: (Sweden) Jarmo Sandelin

The 1995 European Tour, titled as the 1995 Volvo Tour for sponsorship reasons, was the 24th season of the European Tour, the main professional golf tour in Europe since its inaugural season in 1972.

It was the eighth season of the tour under a title sponsorship agreement with Volvo, that was announced in May 1987.

== Changes for 1995 ==
The 1995 season marked the start of co-sanctioning arrangements with other tours, with the addition of the Southern Africa Tour's Lexington South African PGA Championship to the European Tour schedule. The season was ultimately made up of 36 tournaments counting for the Order of Merit, and several non-counting "Approved Special Events".

There were a few other changes from the previous season, with the addition of the South African PGA Championship and the loss of the Open V33 Grand Lyon and the Belgian Open. In addition, the Extremadura Open was originally scheduled but later cancelled.

== Schedule ==
The following table lists official events during the 1995 season.

Date	Tournament	Host country	Purse (£)	Winner (Note: The number in brackets after each winner's name is the number of European Tour events they had won up to and including that tournament. This information is only shown for European Tour members and are inclusive of the three United States-based major championships which were included on the schedule for the first time in 1998, with earlier editions having retrospectively been recognised as official tour wins.)	OWGR points	Other tours (Note: AFR − Southern Africa Tour.)	Notes
22 Jan	Dubai Desert Classic	UAE	US$700,000	(United States) Fred Couples (n/a)	46		
29 Jan	Johnnie Walker Classic	Philippines	600,000	(United States) Fred Couples (n/a)	48		
5 Feb	Madeira Island Open	Portugal	250,000	(Spain) Santiago Luna (1)	20		
12 Feb	Turespaña Open De Canaria	Spain	250,000	(Sweden) Jarmo Sandelin (1)	22		
19 Feb	Lexington South African PGA Championship	South Africa	250,000	(South Africa) Ernie Els (3)	30	AFR	New to European Tour
26 Feb	Turespaña Open Mediterrania	Spain	300,000	(Sweden) Robert Karlsson (1)	26		
5 Mar	Turespaña Masters Open de Andalucía	Spain	300,000	(Germany) Alex Čejka (1)	28		
12 Mar	Moroccan Open	Morocco	350,000	(England) Mark James (17)	24		
19 Mar	Portuguese Open	Portugal	300,000	(Scotland) Adam Hunter (1)	26		
26 Mar	Turespaña Open de Baleares	Spain	250,000	(New Zealand) Greg Turner (3)	20		
~~2 Apr~~	Extremadura Open	Spain	–	Cancelled	–		
9 Apr	Masters Tournament	United States	US$2,200,000	(United States) Ben Crenshaw (n/a)	100		Major championship (Note: Unofficial money event at the time, but retrospectively counted as an official win.)
17 Apr	Open Catalonia	Spain	300,000	(Republic of Ireland) Philip Walton (2)	22		
23 Apr	Air France Cannes Open	France	225,000	(Switzerland) André Bossert (1)	20		
7 May	Italian Open	Italy	375,000	(Scotland) Sam Torrance (18)	22		
14 May	Benson & Hedges International Open	England	650,000	(Australia) Peter O'Malley (2)	42		
21 May	Peugeot Spanish Open	Spain	550,000	(Spain) Seve Ballesteros (50)	42		
29 May	Volvo PGA Championship	England	900,000	(Germany) Bernhard Langer (33)	64		Flagship event
4 Jun	Murphy's English Open	England	650,000	(Republic of Ireland) Philip Walton (3)	36		
11 Jun	Deutsche Bank Open TPC of Europe	Germany	650,000	(Germany) Bernhard Langer (34)	34		
18 Jun	DHL Jersey Open	Jersey	300,000	(Scotland) Andrew Oldcorn (2)	20		
18 Jun	U.S. Open	United States	US$2,000,000	(United States) Corey Pavin (2)	100		Major championship
25 Jun	Peugeot Open de France	France	550,000	(England) Paul Broadhurst (4)	28		
2 Jul	BMW International Open	Germany	550,000	(New Zealand) Frank Nobilo (4)	30		
9 Jul	Murphy's Irish Open	Ireland	675,000	(Scotland) Sam Torrance (19)	44		
15 Jul	Scottish Open	Scotland	650,000	(Australia) Wayne Riley (1)	48		
23 Jul	The Open Championship	Scotland	1,250,000	(United States) John Daly (2)	100		Major championship
30 Jul	Heineken Dutch Open	Netherlands	650,000	(United States) Scott Hoch (n/a)	42		
6 Aug	Volvo Scandinavian Masters	Sweden	650,000	(Sweden) Jesper Parnevik (2)	36		
13 Aug	Hohe Brücke Open	Austria	250,000	(Germany) Alex Čejka (2)	20		
13 Aug	PGA Championship	United States	US$2,000,000	(Australia) Steve Elkington (n/a)	100		Major championship
20 Aug	Chemapol Trophy Czech Open	Czech Republic	750,000	(United States) Peter Teravainen (1)	24		
27 Aug	Volvo German Open	Germany	650,000	(Scotland) Colin Montgomerie (8)	38		
3 Sep	Canon European Masters	Switzerland	700,000	(Sweden) Mathias Grönberg (1)	40		
10 Sep	Trophée Lancôme	France	600,000	(Scotland) Colin Montgomerie (9)	44		
17 Sep	Collingtree British Masters	England	650,000	(Scotland) Sam Torrance (20)	38		
1 Oct	Smurfit European Open	Ireland	650,000	(Germany) Bernhard Langer (35)	40		
8 Oct	Mercedes German Masters	Germany	650,000	(Sweden) Anders Forsbrand (6)	40		
29 Oct	Volvo Masters	Spain	750,000	(Germany) Alex Čejka (3)	40		Tour Championship

=== Unofficial events ===
The following events were sanctioned by the European Tour, but did not carry official money, nor were wins official.

Date	Tournament	Host country	Purse (£)	Winner(s)	OWGR points	Notes
30 Apr	Tournoi Perrier de Paris	France	n/a	(Spain) Seve Ballesteros and (Spain) José María Olazábal	n/a	Team event
13 Jul	J. P. McManus Pro-Am	Ireland	n/a	(England) Richard Boxall (England) Paul Broadhurst	n/a	Pro-Am; Title shared
24 Sep	Ryder Cup	United States	n/a	Team Europe	n/a	Team event
15 Oct	Toyota World Match Play Championship	England	650,000	(South Africa) Ernie Els	42	Limited-field event
15 Oct	Glen Dimplex Irish International Match Play Championship	Ireland	n/a	(Republic of Ireland) Des Smyth	n/a	
22 Oct	Dunhill Cup	Scotland	US$1,500,000	Team Scotland	n/a	Team event
5 Nov	Sarazen World Open	United States	US$1,900,000	(New Zealand) Frank Nobilo	32	
12 Nov	World Cup of Golf	China	US$1,300,000	(United States) Fred Couples and (United States) Davis Love III	n/a	Team event
12 Nov	World Cup of Golf Individual Trophy	China	US$200,000	(United States) Davis Love III	n/a	
17 Dec	Johnnie Walker World Golf Championship	Jamaica	US$2,300,000	(United States) Fred Couples	46	Limited-field event
31 Dec	Andersen Consulting World Championship of Golf	United States	US$3,650,000	(England) Barry Lane	48	New tournament Limited-field event

== Order of Merit ==
The Order of Merit was titled as the Volvo Order of Merit and was based on prize money won during the season, calculated in Pound sterling.

Position	Player	Prize money (£)
1	(Scotland) Colin Montgomerie	835,051
2	(Scotland) Sam Torrance	755,706
3	(Germany) Bernhard Langer	655,854
4	(Italy) Costantino Rocca	516,320
5	(New Zealand) Michael Campbell	400,977
6	(Germany) Alex Čejka	308,115
7	(England) Mark James	297,378
8	(England) Barry Lane	284,406
9	(Sweden) Anders Forsbrand	281,726
10	(Australia) Peter O'Malley	260,727

== Awards ==
Award	Winner	Ref.
Golfer of the Year	(Scotland) Colin Montgomerie	
Sir Henry Cotton Rookie of the Year	(Sweden) Jarmo Sandelin	

== See also ==
- 1995 Challenge Tour
- 1995 European Seniors Tour
