= Phillip Price =

Welsh professional golfer (born 1966)

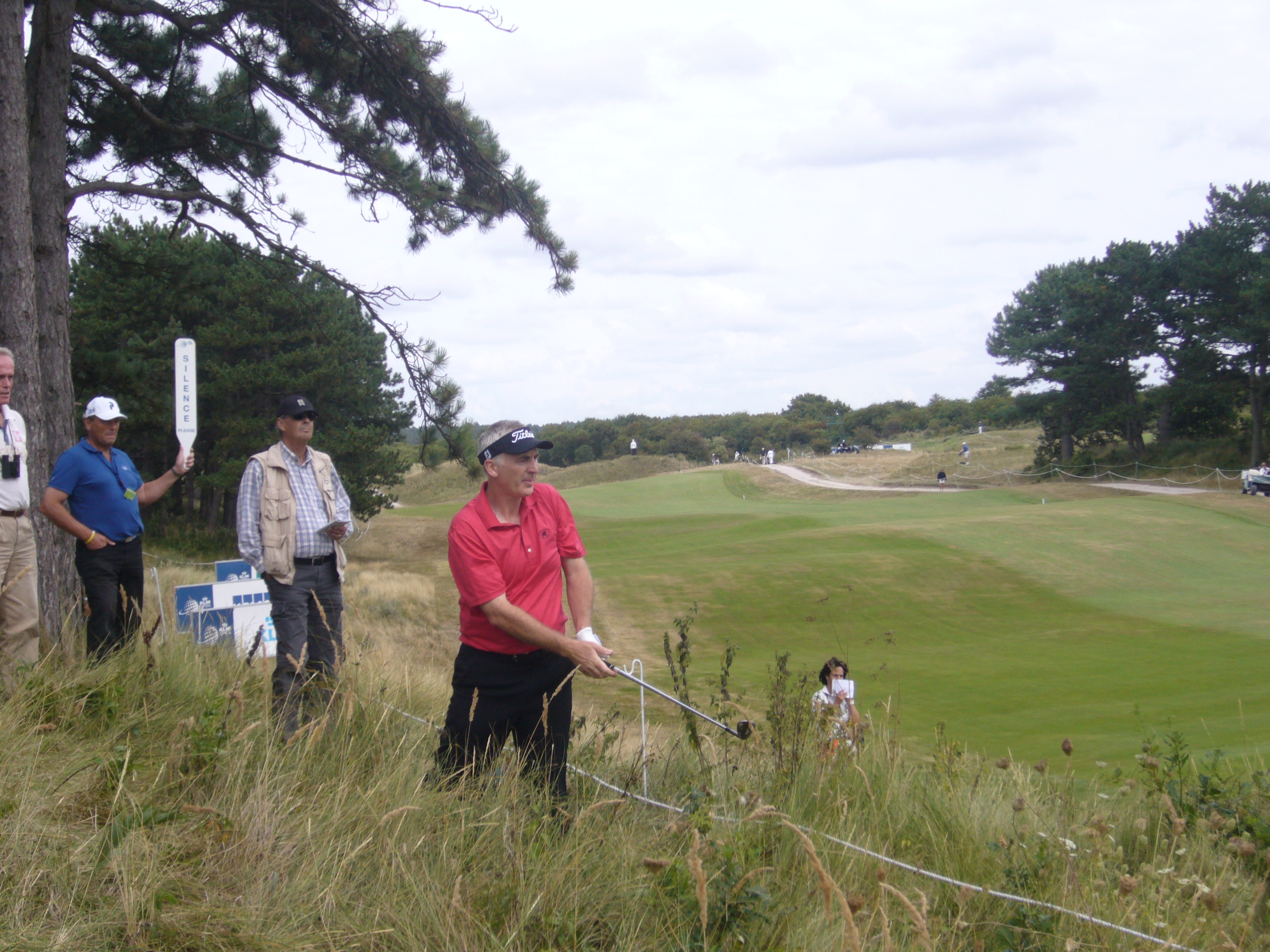

Personal information
- Full name: John Phillip Price
- Nationality: Wales
- Born: 21 October 1966 (age 60) Pontypridd, Wales
- Height: 5 ft 11 in (1.80 m)

Career
- Sport: Golf
- Turned professional: 1989
- Current tour: European Senior Tour
- Former tours: PGA Tour; European Tour; PGA Tour Champions
- Professional wins: 7
- Highest ranking: 41 (20 July 2003)

Number of wins by tour
- European Tour: 3
- European Senior Tour: 3
- Other: 1

Best results in major championships
- Masters Tournament: T35: 2004
- PGA Championship: T58: 2001
- U.S. Open: T53: 1999
- The Open Championship: T10: 2003

Achievements and awards
- European Senior Tour Order of Merit winner: 2019

John Phillip Price (born 21 October 1966) is a Welsh professional golfer who plays on the European Senior Tour. He won three European Tour events between 1994 and 2003 and played in the 2002 Ryder Cup.

== Career ==
In 1966, Price was born in Pontypridd, Wales.

In 1989, Price turned professional. He qualified for membership of the European Tour for the 1991 season via the 1990 Qualifying School. His best year on the tour came in 2000, when he finished eighth on the Order of Merit. His other top ten placing came in 2003, when he was tenth.

He has three tournament wins on the European Tour. In 2005 he played on the U.S.-based PGA Tour, but he did not do well enough to retain his card. He has featured in the top 50 of the Official World Golf Ranking.

Price has made one appearance in the Ryder Cup, playing for the winning European team of 2002. He beat Phil Mickelson in the final day's singles to secure an invaluable point and an historic victory. The moment later became famous due to Price bragging to everyone afterwards, exclaiming "Tell them who I beat!"

Price played in the 2016 Senior Italian Open which started on his 50th birthday and finished second, a stroke behind Stephen Dodd. In 2017, he had his first win on the European Senior Tour, winning the WINSTONgolf Senior Open. He won the 2019 Staysure PGA Seniors Championship for his second European Senior Tour win.

He currently resides in Newport, Wales.

== Professional wins (7) ==
=== European Tour wins (3) ===
No	Date	Tournament	Winning score	Margin of victory	Runners-up
1	20 Mar 1994	Portuguese Open	−6 (64-71-71-72=278)	4 strokes	(England) Paul Eales, (England) David Gilford, (South Africa) Retief Goosen
2	29 Apr 2001	Algarve Open de Portugal (2)	−15 (72-67-70-64=273)	2 strokes	(Republic of Ireland) Pádraig Harrington, (Germany) Sven Strüver
3	6 Jul 2003	Smurfit European Open	−16 (66-69-67-70=272)	1 stroke	(Scotland) Alastair Forsyth, (Zimbabwe) Mark McNulty

=== Other wins (1) ===
- 1993 Welsh Professional Championship

=== European Senior Tour wins (3) ===
No.	Date	Tournament	Winning score	Margin of victory	Runner(s)-up
1	16 Jul 2017	WINSTONgolf Senior Open	−14 (66-69-67=202)	1 stroke	(Thailand) Thaworn Wiratchant
2	4 Aug 2019	Staysure PGA Seniors Championship	−17 (67-66-71-67=271)	2 strokes	(New Zealand) Michael Campbell, (South Africa) James Kingston, (Australia) Peter Lonard
3	20 Aug 2022	Irish Legends	E (72-70-71=213)	1 stroke	(England) Peter Baker, (Italy) Emanuele Canonica, (England) Paul Eales, (Sweden) Jarmo Sandelin, (Denmark) Steen Tinning

European Senior Tour playoff record (0–2)

No.	Year	Tournament	Opponent	Result
1	2018	MCB Tour Championship (Seychelles)	(England) Roger Chapman	Lost to eagle on first extra hole
2	2021	Irish Legends	(Denmark) Thomas Bjørn	Lost to birdie on second extra hole

== Results in major championships ==
Tournament	1992	1993	1994	1995	1996	1997	1998	1999
Masters Tournament								
U.S. Open								T53
The Open Championship	CUT						CUT	T58
PGA Championship								

Tournament	2000	2001	2002	2003	2004	2005	2006
Masters Tournament					T35		
U.S. Open		WD			T57		
The Open Championship	CUT	T30	CUT	T10	CUT		CUT
PGA Championship	CUT	T15	CUT	CUT	CUT		

Top 10
Did not play

WD = Withdrew
CUT = missed the halfway cut
"T" indicates a tie for a place.

=== Summary ===
Tournament	Wins	2nd	3rd	Top-5	Top-10	Top-25	Events	Cuts made
Masters Tournament	0	0	0	0	0	0	1	1
U.S. Open	0	0	0	0	0	0	3	2
The Open Championship	0	0	0	0	1	1	9	3
PGA Championship	0	0	0	0	0	1	5	1
Totals	0	0	0	0	1	2	18	7

- Most consecutive cuts made – 2 (three times)
- Longest streak of top-10s – 1

== Results in World Golf Championships ==
Tournament	2000	2001	2002	2003	2004
Match Play		R64	R64		R64
Championship	T17	NT^{1}		T54	
Invitational	T2	28	T71	T67	T50

^{1}Cancelled due to 9/11

Top 10
Did not play

QF, R16, R32, R64 = Round in which player lost in match play
"T" = Tied
NT = No tournament

== Team appearances ==
Amateur

- Jacques Léglise Trophy (representing Great Britain & Ireland): 1984 (winners)
- European Amateur Team Championship (representing Wales): 1987, 1989

Professional

- Alfred Dunhill Cup (representing Wales): 1991, 1996, 2000
- World Cup (representing Wales): 1991, 1994, 1995, 1997, 1998, 1999, 2000, 2001, 2004
- Seve Trophy (representing Great Britain & Ireland): 2000, 2003 (winners)
- Ryder Cup (representing Europe): 2002 (winners)

== See also ==
- 2004 PGA Tour Qualifying School graduates
