= 1994 European Tour =

Golf tour season

1994 European Tour season
- Duration: 13 January 1994 – 30 October 1994
- Number of official events: 38 (Note: A further three tournaments were scheduled but were cancelled.)
- Most wins: (Scotland) Colin Montgomerie (3) (Spain) José María Olazábal (3)
- Order of Merit: (Scotland) Colin Montgomerie
- Golfer of the Year: (South Africa) Ernie Els
- Sir Henry Cotton Rookie of the Year: (England) Jonathan Lomas

The 1994 European Tour, titled as the 1994 Volvo Tour for sponsorship reasons, was the 23rd season of the European Tour, the main professional golf tour in Europe since its inaugural season in 1972.

It was the seventh season of the tour under a title sponsorship agreement with Volvo, that was announced in May 1987.

== Changes for 1994 ==
The season was made up of 38 tournaments counting for the Order of Merit, and several non-counting "Approved Special Events".

Aside from scheduling, initially there was just one change from the previous season, with the addition of the Extremadura Open. This created a sequence of five consecutive tournaments in Spain through February and March, and a total of nine events in the country although the Madrid Open would later be cancelled.

Shortly after the start of the season, the Roma Masters was cancelled and replaced by the Tournoi Perrier de Paris, a team event with prize money not counting towards the Order of Merit. In late January, a further tournament was added to the schedule with the inaugural Chemapol Trophy Czech Open, opposite the Toyota World Match Play Championship in mid-October. The Madrid Open, originally scheduled for 20–23 October, was cancelled with the Chemapol Trophy Czech Open taking the dates. In addition, the Kronenbourg Open was not held.

== Schedule ==
The following table lists official events during the 1994 season.

Date	Tournament	Host country	Purse (£)	Winner (Note: The number in brackets after each winner's name is the number of European Tour events they had won up to and including that tournament. This information is only shown for European Tour members and are inclusive of the three United States-based major championships which were included on the schedule for the first time in 1998, with earlier editions having retrospectively been recognised as official tour wins.)	OWGR points	Notes
16 Jan	Madeira Island Open	Portugal	250,000	(Sweden) Mats Lanner (2)	20	
23 Jan	Moroccan Open	Morocco	350,000	(Sweden) Anders Forsbrand (5)	20	
30 Jan	Dubai Desert Classic	UAE	US$700,000	(South Africa) Ernie Els (1)	46	
6 Feb	Johnnie Walker Classic	Thailand	600,000	(Australia) Greg Norman (14)	54	
13 Feb	Turespaña Open De Tenerife	Spain	250,000	(England) David Gilford (5)	20	
20 Feb	Extremadura Open	Spain	250,000	(England) Paul Eales (1)	20	New tournament
27 Feb	Turespaña Masters Open de Andalucía	Spain	300,000	(England) Carl Mason (1)	24	
6 Mar	Turespaña Open Mediterrania	Spain	300,000	(Spain) José María Olazábal (14)	26	
13 Mar	Turespaña Open de Baleares	Spain	250,000	(England) Barry Lane (4)	20	
20 Mar	Portuguese Open	Portugal	300,000	(Wales) Phillip Price (1)	22	
~~27 Mar~~	Kronenbourg Open	Italy	–	Cancelled	–	
4 Apr	Open V33 Grand Lyon	France	225,000	(Trinidad and Tobago) Stephen Ames (1)	20	
10 Apr	Masters Tournament	United States	US$2,000,000	(Spain) José María Olazábal (15)	100	Major championship (Note: Unofficial money event at the time, but retrospectively counted as an official win.)
~~17 Apr~~	Roma Masters	Italy	–	Cancelled	–	
24 Apr	Heineken Open Catalonia	Spain	300,000	(Argentina) José Cóceres (1)	20	
1 May	Air France Cannes Open	France	300,000	(Wales) Ian Woosnam (23)	38	
8 May	Benson & Hedges International Open	England	650,000	(Spain) Seve Ballesteros (48)	48	
15 May	Peugeot Spanish Open	Spain	500,000	(Scotland) Colin Montgomerie (5)	42	
22 May	Tisettanta Italian Open	Italy	450,000	(Argentina) Eduardo Romero (5)	28	
30 May	Volvo PGA Championship	England	800,000	(Spain) José María Olazábal (16)	64	Flagship event
5 Jun	Alfred Dunhill Open	Belgium	600,000	(England) Nick Faldo (29)	46	
12 Jun	Honda Open	Germany	500,000	(Australia) Robert Allenby (1)	38	
19 Jun	Jersey European Airways Open	Jersey	350,000	(England) Paul Curry (1)	20	
20 Jun	U.S. Open	United States	US$1,700,000	(South Africa) Ernie Els (2)	100	Major championship
26 Jun	Peugeot Open de France	France	550,000	(England) Mark Roe (3)	36	
3 Jul	Murphy's Irish Open	Ireland	600,000	(Germany) Bernhard Langer (31)	48	
9 Jul	Bell's Scottish Open	Scotland	600,000	(England) Carl Mason (2)	44	
17 Jul	The Open Championship	Scotland	1,000,000	(Zimbabwe) Nick Price (4)	100	Major championship
24 Jul	Heineken Dutch Open	Netherlands	650,000	(Spain) Miguel Ángel Jiménez (2)	44	
31 Jul	Scandinavian Masters	Sweden	650,000	(Fiji) Vijay Singh (5)	40	
7 Aug	BMW International Open	Germany	525,000	(Zimbabwe) Mark McNulty (12)	36	
14 Aug	Hohe Brücke Open	Austria	250,000	(England) Mark Davis (2)	20	
14 Aug	PGA Championship	United States	US$1,750,000	(Zimbabwe) Nick Price (5)	100	Major championship
21 Aug	Murphy's English Open	England	600,000	(Scotland) Colin Montgomerie (6)	38	
28 Aug	Volvo German Open	Germany	650,000	(Scotland) Colin Montgomerie (7)	38	
4 Sep	Canon European Masters	Switzerland	675,000	(Argentina) Eduardo Romero (6)	44	
11 Sep	European Open	England	600,000	(England) David Gilford (6)	44	
18 Sep	Dunhill British Masters	England	650,000	(Wales) Ian Woosnam (24)	50	
25 Sep	Trophée Lancôme	France	600,000	(Fiji) Vijay Singh (6)	50	Limited-field event
3 Oct	Mercedes German Masters	Germany	625,000	(Spain) Seve Ballesteros (49)	48	
~~23 Oct~~	Madrid Open	Spain	–	Cancelled	–	
23 Oct	Chemapol Trophy Czech Open	Czech Republic	500,000	(Sweden) Per-Ulrik Johansson (2)	36	New to European Tour
30 Oct	Volvo Masters	Spain	750,000	(Germany) Bernhard Langer (32)	50	Tour Championship

=== Unofficial events ===
The following events were sanctioned by the European Tour, but did not carry official money, nor were wins official.

Date	Tournament	Host country	Purse (£)	Winner(s)	OWGR points	Notes
17 Apr	Tournoi Perrier de Paris	France	n/a	(England) Peter Baker and (England) David J. Russell	n/a	New tournament Team event
9 Oct	Dunhill Cup	Scotland	US$1,500,000	Team Canada	n/a	Team event
16 Oct	Toyota World Match Play Championship	England	600,000	(South Africa) Ernie Els	46	Limited-field event
6 Nov	Sarazen World Open	United States	US$1,900,000	(South Africa) Ernie Els	36	New tournament
13 Nov	World Cup of Golf	Puerto Rico	US$1,200,000	(United States) Fred Couples and (United States) Davis Love III	n/a	Team event
13 Nov	World Cup of Golf Individual Trophy	Puerto Rico	US$1,200,000	(United States) Fred Couples	n/a	
18 Dec	Johnnie Walker World Golf Championship	Jamaica	US$2,500,000	(South Africa) Ernie Els	60	Limited-field event

== Order of Merit ==
The Order of Merit was titled as the Volvo Order of Merit and was based on prize money won during the season, calculated in Pound sterling.

Position	Player	Prize money (£)
1	(Scotland) Colin Montgomerie	762,719
2	(Germany) Bernhard Langer	635,483
3	(Spain) Seve Ballesteros	590,101
4	(Spain) José María Olazábal	516,107
5	(Spain) Miguel Ángel Jiménez	437,403
6	(Fiji) Vijay Singh	364,313
7	(England) David Gilford	326,629
8	(England) Nick Faldo	321,256
9	(England) Mark Roe	312,539
10	(South Africa) Ernie Els	311,849

== Awards ==
Award	Winner	Ref.
Golfer of the Year	(South Africa) Ernie Els	
Sir Henry Cotton Rookie of the Year	(England) Jonathan Lomas	

== See also ==
- 1994 Challenge Tour
- 1994 European Seniors Tour
