= Audi Open =

Tournament information
- Location: Hamburg, Germany
- Established: 1990
- Course: Golf-Club Hamburg Wendlohe
- Par: 72
- Tour: Challenge Tour
- Format: Stroke play
- Prize fund: £65,000
- Month played: July
- Final year: 1993

Tournament record score
- Aggregate: 275 Paul Eales (1991)
- To par: −13 as above

Final champion
- (Germany) Alex Čejka

Location map
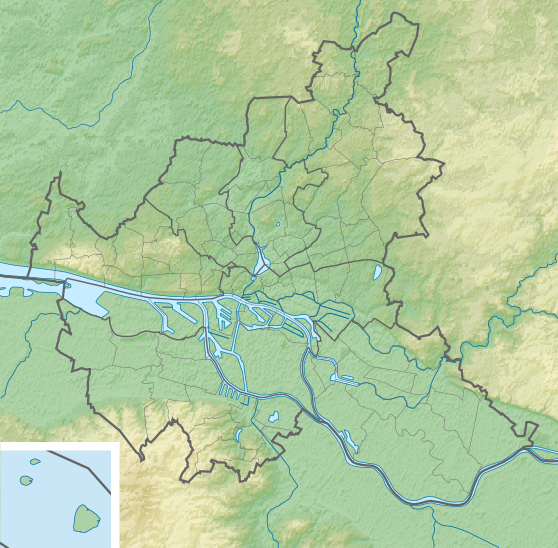
- Location in Germany Location in Hamburg

The Audi Trophy was a golf tournament on the Challenge Tour. It was played from 1990 to 1993 near Munich then Hamburg in Germany.

The tournament ran parallel to the Audi Quattro Trophy, a Challenge Tour event in Germany 1989–1998.

== Winners ==
Year	Winner	Score	To par	Margin of victory	Runner(s)-up	Venue	Ref
1993	(Germany) Alex Čejka	209 (Note: Shortened to 54 holes due to rain.)	−7	Playoff	(England) Peter Harrison (England) Liam White	Wendlohe	
1992	(Wales) Paul Affleck	276	−12	2 strokes	(Germany) Sven Strüver	Wendlohe	
1991	(England) Paul Eales	275	−13	2 strokes	(Denmark) Jacob Rasmussen	St Dionys	
1990	(Australia) Brad King	287	−1	Playoff	(Scotland) Colin Brooks	Olching	

== See also ==
- Audi Quattro Trophy
