= 1996 Dunhill Cup =

Coordinates: 56.351484°N 2.816147°W

Tournament information
- Dates: 10–13 October
- Location: St Andrews, Scotland
- Course: Old Course at St Andrews
- Format: Match play

Statistics
- Par: 72
- Length: 6,933 yards (6,340 m)
- Field: 16 teams of 3 players
- Prize fund: £1,000,000
- Winner's share: £300,000

Champion
- United States (Phil Mickelson, Mark O'Meara, Steve Stricker)

The 1996 Dunhill Cup was the 12th Dunhill Cup. It was a team tournament featuring 16 countries, each represented by three players. The Cup was played 10–13 October at the Old Course at St Andrews in Scotland. The sponsor was the Alfred Dunhill company. The American team of Phil Mickelson, Mark O'Meara, and Steve Stricker beat the team from New Zealand of Frank Nobilo, Greg Turner, and Grant Waite in the final. It was the third win for the United States.

== Format ==
The Cup was a match play event played over four days. The teams were divided into four four-team groups. The top eight teams were seeded with the remaining teams randomly placed in the groups. After three rounds of round-robin play, the top team in each group advanced to a single elimination playoff.

In each team match, the three players were paired with their opponents and played 18 holes at medal match play. Matches tied at the end of 18 holes were extended to a sudden-death playoff. The tie-breaker for ties within a group was based on match record, then head-to-head.

== Group play ==
=== Round one ===
Group 1

United States – 2		Italy – 1	
Player	Score	Player	Score
Mark O'Meara	63	Costantino Rocca	70
Phil Mickelson	72	Emanuele Canonica	72
Steve Stricker	68	Silvio Grappasonni	75

Canonica won on the second playoff hole.

Spain – 0		England – 3	
Player	Score	Player	Score
Ignacio Garrido	77	Lee Westwood	69
Miguel Ángel Jiménez	71	Jonathan Lomas	70
Diego Borrego	76	Barry Lane	69

Group 2

Zimbabwe – 2		India – 1	
Player	Score	Player	Score
Tony Johnstone	73	Ali Sher	72
Mark McNulty	70	Gaurav Ghei	73
Nick Price	70	Jeev Milkha Singh	71

Scotland – 1		Sweden – 2	
Player	Score	Player	Score
Andrew Coltart	67	Peter Hedblom	70
Raymond Russell	69	Patrik Sjöland	68
Colin Montgomerie	69	Jarmo Sandelin	68

Group 3

South Africa – 2		Canada – 1	
Player	Score	Player	Score
Wayne Westner	68	Rick Todd	77
Ernie Els	65	Rick Gibson	73
Retief Goosen	76	Jim Rutledge	69

Ireland – 2		Wales – 1	
Player	Score	Player	Score
Darren Clarke	71	Mark Mouland	70
Paul McGinley	68	Paul Affleck	70
Pádraig Harrington	70	Phillip Price	74

Group 4

New Zealand – 2		Germany – 1	
Player	Score	Player	Score
Grant Waite	69	Heinz-Peter Thül	69
Greg Turner	74	Thomas Gögele	71
Frank Nobilo	66	Sven Strüver	71

Waite won on the fourth playoff hole.

Australia – 2		Japan – 1	
Player	Score	Player	Score
Wayne Riley	71	Naomichi Ozaki	67
Steve Elkington	68	Kazuhiro Takami	74
Greg Norman	72	Hajime Meshiai	74

=== Round two ===
Group 1

United States – 2		England – 1	
Player	Score	Player	Score
Mark O'Meara	75	Barry Lane	72
Steve Stricker	75	Jonathan Lomas	79
Phil Mickelson	72	Lee Westwood	73

Spain – 2		Italy – 1	
Player	Score	Player	Score
Miguel Ángel Jiménez	69	Silvio Grappasonni	79
Ignacio Garrido	74	Emanuele Canonica	79
Diego Borrego	76	Costantino Rocca	73

Group 2

Zimbabwe – 0		Sweden – 3	
Player	Score	Player	Score
Tony Johnstone	76	Patrik Sjöland	73
Nick Price	75	Jarmo Sandelin	75
Mark McNulty	73	Peter Hedblom	72

Sandelin won on the first playoff hole.

India – 2		Scotland – 1	
Player	Score	Player	Score
Jeev Milkha Singh	74	Andrew Coltart	74
Gaurav Ghei	78	Colin Montgomerie	79
Ali Sher	84	Raymond Russell	71

Singh won on the first playoff hole.

Group 3

Ireland – 3		Canada – 0	
Player	Score	Player	Score
Darren Clarke	76	Rick Gibson	80
Pádraig Harrington	73	Rick Todd	73
Paul McGinley	71	Jim Rutledge	77

Harrington won on the first playoff hole.

South Africa – 2		Wales – 1	
Player	Score	Player	Score
Retief Goosen	78	Phillip Price	73
Ernie Els	70	Mark Mouland	80
Wayne Westner	72	Paul Affleck	76

Group 4

Japan – 2		New Zealand – 1	
Player	Score	Player	Score
Naomichi Ozaki	69	Frank Nobilo	73
Hajime Meshiai	73	Grant Waite	72
Kazuhiro Takami	70	Greg Turner	73

Australia – 3		Germany – 0	
Player	Score	Player	Score
Wayne Riley	74	Heinz-Peter Thül	76
Greg Norman	71	Sven Strüver	73
Steve Elkington	71	Thomas Gögele	80

=== Round three ===
Group 1

United States – 3		Spain – 0	
Player	Score	Player	Score
Mark O'Meara	67	Miguel Ángel Jiménez	68
Steve Stricker	70	Diego Borrego	74
Phil Mickelson	66	Ignacio Garrido	77

Italy – 2		England – 1	
Player	Score	Player	Score
Costantino Rocca	72	Lee Westwood	74
Silvio Grappasonni	68	Jonathan Lomas	69
Emanuele Canonica	76	Barry Lane	74

Group 2

Zimbabwe – 2		Scotland – 1	
Player	Score	Player	Score
Tony Johnstone	70	Andrew Coltart	72
Mark McNulty	69	Colin Montgomerie	70
Nick Price	76	Raymond Russell	72

Sweden – 3		India – 0	
Player	Score	Player	Score
Patrik Sjöland	68	Jeev Milkha Singh	74
Peter Hedblom	69	Gaurav Ghei	72
Jarmo Sandelin	72	Ali Sher	73

Group 3

Wales – 2		Canada – 1	
Player	Score	Player	Score
Mark Mouland	75	Rick Gibson	71
Phillip Price	71	Jim Rutledge	72
Paul Affleck	70	Rick Todd	72

South Africa – 2		Ireland – 1	
Player	Score	Player	Score
Retief Goosen	70	Darren Clarke	70
Ernie Els	71	Paul McGinley	69
Wayne Westner	69	Pádraig Harrington	70

Goosen won on the first playoff hole.

Group 4

Australia – 0		New Zealand – 3	
Player	Score	Player	Score
Wayne Riley	76	Grant Waite	69
Steve Elkington	73	Greg Turner	69
Greg Norman	68	Frank Nobilo	66

Germany – 2		Japan – 1	
Player	Score	Player	Score
Sven Strüver	70	Naomichi Ozaki	72
Thomas Gögele	71	Hajime Meshiai	77
Heinz-Peter Thül	74	Kazuhiro Takami	73

=== Standings ===
Group 1
Country	W	L	MW	ML
United States	3	0	7	2
England	1	2	5	4
Italy	1	2	4	5
Spain	1	2	2	7

Group 2
Country	W	L	MW	ML
Sweden	3	0	8	1
Zimbabwe	2	1	4	5
India	1	2	3	6
Scotland	0	3	3	6

Group 3
Country	W	L	MW	ML
South Africa	3	0	6	3
Ireland	2	1	6	3
Wales	1	2	4	5
Canada	0	3	2	7

Group 4
Country	W	L	MW	ML
New Zealand	2	1	6	3
Australia	2	1	5	4
Japan	1	2	4	5
Germany	1	2	3	6

== Playoffs ==
=== Bracket ===
Semi-finals
1	United States	2
Sweden	1
3	South Africa	1
7	New Zealand	2

Final
1	United States	2
7	New Zealand	1

=== Semi-finals ===
United States – 2		Sweden – 1	
Player	Score	Player	Score
Mark O'Meara	68	Peter Hedblom	74
Steve Stricker	70	Patrik Sjöland	73
Phil Mickelson	71	Jarmo Sandelin	68

South Africa – 1		New Zealand – 2	
Player	Score	Player	Score
Wayne Westner	74	Grant Waite	74
Retief Goosen	72	Greg Turner	71
Ernie Els	69	Frank Nobilo	72

Waite won on the third playoff hole.

=== Final ===
United States – 2		New Zealand – 1	
Player	Score	Player	Score
Mark O'Meara	72	Frank Nobilo	69
Phil Mickelson	69	Greg Turner	72
Steve Stricker	67	Grant Waite	73

== Team results ==
Country	Place	W	L	MW	ML	Seed
United States	1	5	0	11	4	1
New Zealand	2	3	2	9	6	7
Sweden	T3	3	1	9	3	
South Africa	T3	3	1	7	5	3
Ireland	T5	2	1	6	3	6
Australia	T5	2	1	5	4	2
Zimbabwe	T5	2	1	4	5	4
England	T8	1	2	5	4	
Italy	T8	1	2	4	5	
Japan	T8	1	2	4	5	
Wales	T8	1	2	4	5	
Germany	T8	1	2	3	6	
India	T8	1	2	3	6	
Spain	T8	1	2	2	7	8
Scotland	T15	0	3	3	6	5
Canada	T15	0	3	2	7	

== Player results ==
Country	Player	W	L
United States	Steve Stricker	5	0
United States	Phil Mickelson	3	2
United States	Mark O'Meara	3	2
New Zealand	Grant Waite	4	1
New Zealand	Frank Nobilo	3	2
New Zealand	Greg Turner	2	3
Sweden	Jarmo Sandelin	4	0
Sweden	Peter Hedblom	2	2
Sweden	Patrik Sjöland	2	2
South Africa	Ernie Els	3	1
South Africa	Wayne Westner	3	1
South Africa	Retief Goosen	1	3
Ireland	Paul McGinley	3	0
Ireland	Pádraig Harrington	2	1
Ireland	Darren Clarke	1	2
Australia	Steve Elkington	2	1
Australia	Greg Norman	2	1
Australia	Wayne Riley	1	2
Zimbabwe	Mark McNulty	2	1
Zimbabwe	Tony Johnstone	1	2
Zimbabwe	Nick Price	1	2
England	Barry Lane	3	0
England	Jonathan Lomas	1	2
England	Lee Westwood	1	2
Italy	Costantino Rocca	2	1
Italy	Emanuele Canonica	1	2
Italy	Silvio Grappasonni	1	2
Japan	Naomichi Ozaki	2	1
Japan	Kazuhiro Takami	2	1
Japan	Hajime Meshiai	0	3
Wales	Phillip Price	2	1
Wales	Paul Affleck	1	2
Wales	Mark Mouland	1	2
Germany	Thomas Gögele	2	1
Germany	Sven Strüver	1	2
Germany	Heinz-Peter Thül	0	3
India	Gaurav Ghei	1	2
India	Ali Sher	1	2
India	Jeev Milkha Singh	1	2
Spain	Ignacio Garrido	1	2
Spain	Miguel Ángel Jiménez	1	2
Spain	Diego Borrego	0	3
Scotland	Raymond Russell	3	0
Scotland	Andrew Coltart	1	2
Scotland	Colin Montgomerie	0	3
Canada	Rick Gibson	1	2
Canada	Jim Rutledge	1	2
Canada	Rick Todd	0	3
