= 1987 European Amateur Team Championship =

Golf competition

Tournament information
- Dates: 24–28 June 1987
- Location: Frohnleiten, Austria; 47.230°N 15.324°E
- Course: Golfclub Murhof
- Organized by: European Golf Association
- Format: Qualification round: 36 holes stroke play Knock-out match-play

Statistics
- Par: 72
- Length: 6,705 yards (6,131 m)
- Field: 19 teams 114 players

Champion
- Ireland; Neil Anderson, Pádraig Hogan, Garth McGimpsey, John McHenry, Liam McNamara, Eoghan O'Connell
- Qualification round: 717 (−3); Final match: 4 1/2–2 1/2
- Location in Europe Location in Austria Location in Styria

The 1987 European Amateur Team Championship took place from 24 to 28 June at Golfclub Murhof, in Frohnleiten, Austria. It was the 15th men's golf European Amateur Team Championship.

== Venue ==
The club was founded in 1963 and its course, located 15 kilometers north of Graz in Styria, Austria, was constructed by Dr. Bernhard von Limburger.

The championship course was set up with par 72.

== Format ==
Each team consisted of six players, playing two rounds of an opening stroke-play qualifying competition over two days, counting the five best scores each day for each team.

The eight best teams formed flight A, in knock-out match-play over the next three days. The teams were seeded based on their positions after the stroke play. The first placed team were drawn to play the quarter-final against the eight placed team, the second against the seventh, the third against the sixth and the fourth against the fifth. Teams were allowed to use six players during the team matches, selecting four of them in the two morning foursome games and five players in to the afternoon single games. Games all square at the 18th hole were declared halved, if the team match was already decided.

The seven teams placed 9–15 in the qualification stroke-play formed flight B and the four teams placed 16–19 formed flight C, to play similar knock-out play to decide their final positions.

== Teams ==
19 nation teams contested the event. Each team consisted of six players.

Players in the leading teams

Country	Players
England	Paul Broadhurst, David Curry, Robert Eggo, Peter McEvoy, Jeremy Robinson, Roger Roper
France	Patrice Barques, Eric Giraud, François Illouz, Thomas Levet, Marc Pendariès, Romain Victor
Ireland	Neil Anderson, Pádraig Hogan, Garth McGimpsey, John McHenry, Liam McNamara, Eoghan O'Connell
Scotland	David Carrick, Paul Girvan, George Macgregor, Jim Milligan, Colin Montgomerie, Graem Shaw
Sweden	Dennis Edlund, Anders Haglund, Cristian Härdin, Per-Ulrik Johansson, John Lindberg, Fredrik Lindgren
Switzerland	Andrea Bauer, Marcus Frank, Francesco Gallmann, Thomas Gottstein, Dominique Rey, Erwin Vonlanthen
Wales	Stephen Dodd, Michael Macara, Paul Mayo, Richard Morris, Phillip Price, D. K. Wood
West Germany	Rainer Mund, Hans-Günther Reiter, Andreas Riß, Andreas Roehrich, Ulrich Schulte, Sven Strüver

Other participating teams

Country
Austria
Czechoslovakia
Denmark
Finland
Iceland
Italy
Netherlands
Norway
Portugal
Spain
Yugoslavia

== Winners ==
Team England won the opening 36-hole competition, with a score of 6 under par 714.

Individual leader was Jeremy Robinson, England, with a 6-under-par score of 138, one stroke ahead of John McHenry, Ireland.

Team Ireland won the gold medal, earning their fourth title, beating England in the final 4.5–2.5. Team France earned the bronze on third place, after beating Sweden 5.5–1.5 in the bronze match.

== Results ==
Qualification round

Team standings

Place	Country	Score	To par
1	England	354-360=714	−6
2	Ireland	361-356=717	−3
3	France	369-351=720	E
4	Scotland	366-365=731	+11
5	Sweden	367-365=732	+12
T6	Wales *	362-372=734	+14
T6	West Germany	364-370=734	+14
8	Spain	363-372=735	+15
9	Switzerland	741	+21
10	Italy	743	+23
11	Austria	367-382=749	+29
12	Netherlands	750	+30
13	Denmark	752	+32
14	Iceland	760	+40
15	Norway	762	+42
T16	Finland *	780	+60
T16	Portugal	780	+60
18	Czechoslovakia	782	+62
19	Yugoslavia	870	+150

* Note: In the event of a tie the order was determined by the best total of the two non-counting scores of the two rounds.

Individual leaders

Place	Player	Country	Score	To par
1	Jeremy Robinson	England	69-69=138	−6
2	John McHenry	Ireland	70-69=139	−5
T3	Thomas Levet	France	71-70=141	−3
T3	Matthias Nemes	Austria	70-71=141	−3
T3	Borja Queipo de Llano	Spain	69-72=141	−3
T6	Andreas Bauer	Switzerland	71-71=142	−2
T6	Marc Pendariès	France	73-69=142	−2
T6	Sven Strüver	West Germany	68-74=142	−2

Note: There was no official award for the lowest individual scores.

Flight A

Bracket

Quarter finals
England	6.5
Spain	0.5
Sweden	4
Scotland	3
France	4.5
Wales	2.5
Ireland	5
West Germany	2

Semi finals
England	4.5
Sweden	2.5
Ireland	5.5
France	1.5

Final
Ireland	4.5
England	2.5
Bronze match
France	5.5
Sweden	1.5

Elimination matches
Scotland	4.5
Spain	2.5
Wales	4
West Germany	3

Match for 5th place
Scotland	4
Wales	3
Match for 7th place
West Germany	5
Spain	2

Final games

Ireland	England
4.5	2.5
N. Anderson / G. McGimpsey	P. Broadhurst / D. Curry 4 & 3
J. McHenry / E. O'Connell 3 & 2	P. McEvoy / J. Robinson
John McHenry AS *	Roger Roper AS *
Liam MacNamara 2 & 1	Paul Broadhurst
Garth McGimpsey 1 hole	David Curry
Eoghan O'Connell 5 & 4	Peter McEvoy
Neil Anderson	Jeremy Robinson 2 & 1

* Note: Game declared halved, since team match already decided.

Flight B

Bracket

Round 1
Italy	6
Norway	1
Austria	5
Iceland	2
Netherlands	4
Denmark	3

Round 2
Italy	6
Austria	1
Switzerland	5
Netherlands	2

Match for 9th place
Switzerland	4.5
Italy	2.5
Match for 11th place
Netherlands	5
Austria	2

Elimination match
Iceland	4
Norway	3

Match for 13th place
Denmark	6.5
Iceland	0.5

Flight C

Round 1
Czech Republic	4
Portugal	3
Finland	6
Yugoslavia	1

Match for 16th place
Finland	5
Czech Republic	2
Match for 18th place
Portugal	6
Yugoslavia	1

Final standings

Place	Country
1st place, gold medalist(s)	Ireland
2nd place, silver medalist(s)	England
3rd place, bronze medalist(s)	France
4	Sweden
5	Scotland
6	Wales
7	West Germany
8	Spain
9	Switzerland
10	Italy
11	Netherlands
12	Austria
13	Denmark
14	Iceland
15	Norway
16	Finland
17	Czechoslovakia
18	Portugal
19	Yugoslavia

== See also ==
- Eisenhower Trophy – biennial world amateur team golf championship for men organized by the International Golf Federation.
- European Ladies' Team Championship – European amateur team golf championship for women organised by the European Golf Association.
