= Rick Gibson (golfer) =

Canadian professional golfer

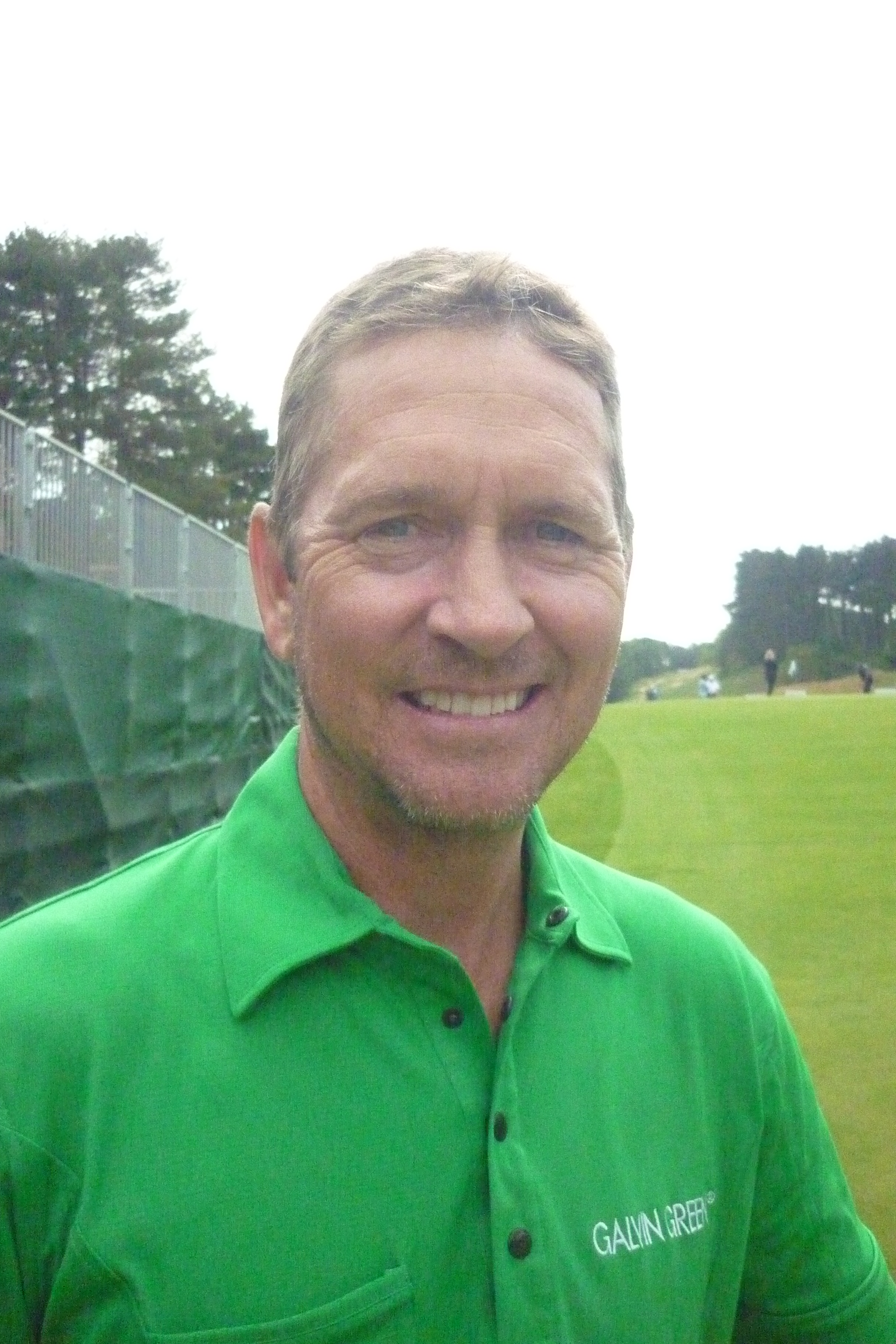

Personal information
- Nationality: Canada
- Born: October 27, 1961 (age 65) Calgary, Alberta, Canada
- Height: 1.72 m (5 ft 8 in)
- Weight: 73 kg (161 lb; 11.5 st)

Career
- Sport: Golf
- College: Brigham Young University
- Turned professional: 1984
- Current tour: European Senior Tour
- Former tours: Japan Golf Tour; Asian Tour; Asia Golf Circuit; Canadian Tour; Champions Tour
- Professional wins: 10

Number of wins by tour
- Japan Golf Tour: 2
- Asian Tour: 1
- European Senior Tour: 1
- Other: 6

Best results in major championships
- Masters Tournament: DNP
- PGA Championship: DNP
- U.S. Open: DNP
- The Open Championship: T92: 1991

Achievements and awards
- Asia Golf Circuit Order of Merit winner: 1991

Rick Gibson (born October 27, 1961) is a Canadian professional golfer who plays primarily in Asia.

== Early life ==
In 1961, Gibson was born in Calgary, Alberta, Canada. He played college golf at Brigham Young University, where he was an All-American in 1984.

== Professional career ==
In 1984, Gibson turned professional. He played on the Canadian Tour shortly after turning professional. Elsewhere, he played on the Asia Golf Circuit, where he won the Order of Merit in 1991, which then qualified him for the Japan Golf Tour, where he won two tournaments. He later also played on the Asian Tour, winning once.

== Awards and honors ==
- In 1984, Gibson earned All-American honors while at Brigham Young University.
- In 1991, Gibson won the Asia Golf Circuit's Order of Merit.

== Professional wins (10) ==
=== PGA of Japan Tour wins (2) ===
No.	Date	Tournament	Winning score	Margin of victory	Runners-up
1	Jun 16, 1991	Sapporo Tokyu Open	−8 (71-71-68-70=280)	Playoff	(Japan) Masahiro Kuramoto, (Japan) Shinsaku Maeda
2	Mar 26, 1995	Novell KSB Open	−17 (65-67-71-68=271)	1 stroke	(Japan) Toshimitsu Izawa, (Japan) Tsukasa Watanabe

PGA of Japan Tour playoff record (1–0)

No.	Year	Tournament	Opponents	Result
1	1991	Sapporo Tokyu Open	(Japan) Masahiro Kuramoto, (Japan) Shinsaku Maeda	Won with birdie on first extra hole

=== Asian Tour wins (1) ===
No.	Date	Tournament	Winning score	Margin of victory	Runner-up
1	Mar 10, 2002	Casino Filipino Philippine Open	−5 (68-69-73-73=283)	4 strokes	(United States) Robert Jacobson

Asian Tour playoff record (0–1)

No.	Year	Tournament	Opponent	Result
1	2006	Bangkok Airways Open	(Thailand) Chawalit Plaphol	Lost to par on first extra hole

=== Asia Golf Circuit wins (1) ===
No.	Date	Tournament	Winning score	Margin of victory	Runner-up
1	Mar 3, 1991	Benson & Hedges Malaysian Open	−11 (70-67-70-70=277)	1 stroke	(Taiwan) Chen Liang-hsi

=== Canadian Tour wins (2) ===
No.	Date	Tournament	Winning score	Margin of victory	Runners-up
1	Sep 10, 1988	Labatt's Blue Light Pro-Am	−9 (71-68-67-69=275)	3 strokes	(United States) Dave DeLong, (Canada) Ward Stouffer
2	Sep 23, 1990	CPGA Championship	−16 (69-66-67-70=272)	1 stroke	(United States) Louis Brown, (Canada) Richard Zokol

=== Earlier Canadian wins (1) ===
No.	Date	Tournament	Winning score	Margin of victory	Runner-up
1	Jul 21, 1985	George Williams B.C. Open	−5 (68-69-71=208)	Playoff	(Canada) Doug Lecuyer

=== Other wins (2) ===
- 1991 Philippine PGA Championship
- 1992 Philippine PGA Championship

=== European Senior Tour wins (1) ===
No.	Date	Tournament	Winning score	Margin of victory	Runner-up
1	Jul 6, 2014	Bad Ragaz PGA Seniors Open	−15 (63-66-66=195)	6 strokes	(Republic of Ireland) Denis O'Sullivan

== Results in major championships ==
Tournament	1991
The Open Championship	T92

"T" = Tied
Note: Gibson only played in The Open Championship.

== Results in senior major championships ==
Tournament	2012	2013	2014	2015
Senior PGA Championship				CUT
U.S. Senior Open				CUT
Senior Players Championship				T20
Senior British Open Championship	CUT		T3	CUT

Top 10
Did not play

"T" indicates a tie for a place
CUT = missed the halfway cut
Note: Gibson never played in The Tradition.

== Team appearances ==
- World Cup (representing Canada): 1990, 1994, 1995, 1996, 1997, 1998
- Dunhill Cup (representing Canada): 1994 (winners), 1995, 1996
