= Matt Oshrine =

American professional golfer (born 1995)

Personal information
- Full name: Matthew Oshrine
- Nationality: United States
- Born: September 14, 1995 (age 31) Baltimore, Maryland, U.S.

Career
- Sport: Golf
- College: Loyola University Maryland; Duke University
- Turned professional: 2017
- Former tours: Challenge Tour; PGA Tour Canada; Korn Ferry Tour; PGA Tour Latinoamérica; Minor League Golf Tour
- Professional wins: 1

Number of wins by tour
- Challenge Tour: 1

Matthew Oshrine (born September 14, 1995) is an American professional golfer who plays on the Challenge Tour.

== Early life and amateur career ==
Oshrine played collegiate golf at both Loyola University Maryland (2013–2015) and Duke University (2015–2017). In the 2014–15 NCAA golf season at Loyola University Maryland, Oshrine won the Doc Gimmler, Middleburg Bank Intercollegiate, and the Patriot League Championships. Oshrine was part of the Duke University team that won the 2017 Atlantic Coast Conference Men's Golf Championship.

== Professional career ==
Oshrine picked up his first professional win at the 2024 Open de Portugal on the Challenge Tour.

== Amateur wins ==
- 2014 The Doc Gimmler
- 2015 Middleburg Bank Intercollegiate, Patriot League Championship
- 2016 Seahawk Intercollegiate

== Professional wins (1) ==
=== Challenge Tour wins (1) ===
No.	Date	Tournament	Winning score	Margin of victory	Runner-up
1	Sep 15, 2024	Open de Portugal	−11 (70-65-69-69=273)	1 stroke	(Italy) Stefano Mazzoli
