= Paul Affleck =

Welsh golfer

Personal information
- Nationality: Wales
- Born: 25 June 1966 (age 60) St Asaph, Wales
- Height: 5 ft 10 in (1.78 m)
- Weight: 154 lb (70 kg; 11.0 st)
- Children: 2

Career
- Sport: Golf
- Turned professional: 1986
- Former tours: European Tour; Challenge Tour
- Professional wins: 1

Number of wins by tour
- Challenge Tour: 1

Best results in major championships
- Masters Tournament: DNP
- PGA Championship: DNP
- U.S. Open: DNP
- The Open Championship: T37: 1999

Achievements and awards
- Challenge Tour Rankings winner: 1992

Paul Affleck (born 25 June 1966) is a Welsh professional golfer who has played on the European Tour.

== Early life ==
Affleck was born in St Asaph.

== Professional career ==
In 1986, Affleck turned pro. He visited qualifying school four times before he finally got his European Tour card after winning the Challenge Tour in 1992. He won the 1992 Audi Open on the Challenge Tour. He had to go back to qualifying school but he regained his card. He held onto it until 2000 where he finished 141st on the Order of Merit.

== Personal life ==
Affleck lives in Chester, England.

== Professional wins (1) ==
=== Challenge Tour wins (1) ===
No.	Date	Tournament	Winning score	Margin of victory	Runner-up
1	30 Aug 1992	Audi Open	−12 (66-69-69-72=276)	2 strokes	(Germany) Sven Strüver

Challenge Tour playoff record (0–1)

No.	Year	Tournament	Opponent	Result
1	1991	Prince's Challenge	(England) Ian Spencer	Lost to birdie on fourth extra hole

== Results in major championships ==
Tournament	1989	1990	1991	1992	1993	1994	1995	1996	1997	1998	1999	2000
The Open Championship	CUT										T37	CUT

Note: Affleck only played in The Open Championship.

Did not play

CUT = missed the half-way cut
"T" = tied

== Team appearances ==
- Alfred Dunhill Cup (representing Wales): 1995, 1996
