= Extremadura Open =

Tournament information
- Location: Badajoz, Spain
- Established: 1994
- Course: Golf del Guadiana
- Par: 72
- Tour: European Tour
- Format: Stroke play
- Prize fund: £250,000
- Month played: February
- Final year: 1994

Tournament record score
- Aggregate: 281 Paul Eales (1994)
- To par: −7 as above

Final champion
- (England) Paul Eales
- Location in Spain Location in Extremadura

The Extremadura Open was a golf tournament on the European Tour in 1994. It was held at Golf del Guadiana in Badajoz, Spain and was won by England's Paul Eales. The event was due to return in March 1995, however was cancelled.

== Winners ==
| Year | Winner | Score | To par | Margin of victory | Runner-up |
|---|---|---|---|---|---|
| 1995 | Cancelled | | | | |
| 1994 | (England) Paul Eales | 281 | −7 | 1 stroke | (Sweden) Peter Hedblom |
