= Jarmo Sandelin =

Swedish professional golfer (born 1967)

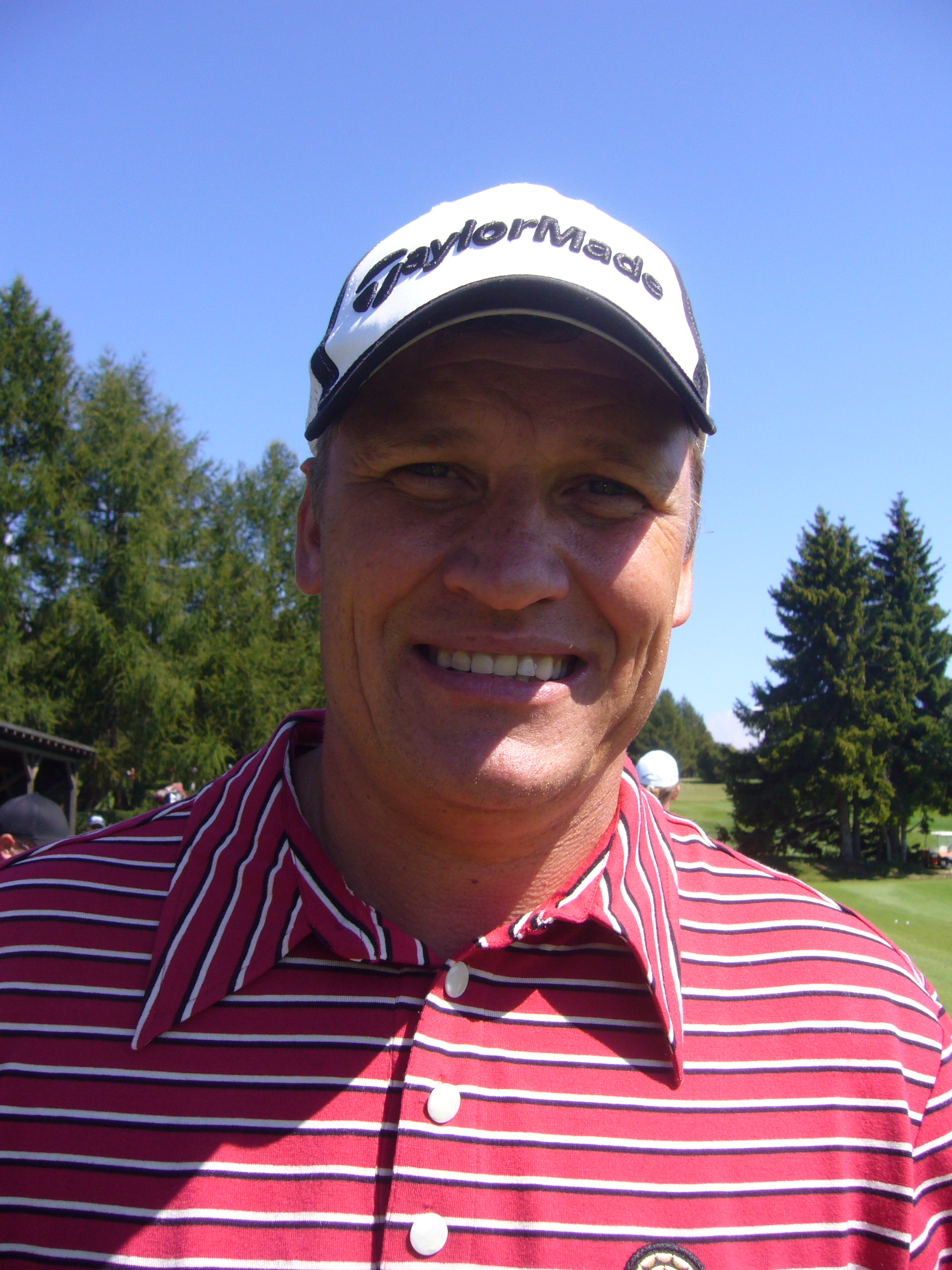

Personal information
- Full name: Jarmo Sakari Sandelin
- Nationality: Sweden
- Born: 10 May 1967 (age 59) Imatra, Finland
- Height: 1.87 m (6 ft 2 in)
- Weight: 82 kg (181 lb; 12.9 st)
- Spouse: Linda Sandelin
- Children: 3

Career
- Sport: Golf
- Turned professional: 1987
- Current tour: European Senior Tour
- Former tours: PGA Tour; European Tour
- Professional wins: 11
- Highest ranking: 59 (11 July 1999)

Number of wins by tour
- European Tour: 5
- Asian Tour: 1
- Challenge Tour: 2
- European Senior Tour: 2
- Other: 2

Best results in major championships
- Masters Tournament: DNP
- PGA Championship: T24: 2000
- U.S. Open: CUT: 2000
- The Open Championship: T31: 2000

Achievements and awards
- Sir Henry Cotton Rookie of the Year: 1995

Jarmo Sakari Sandelin (born 10 May 1967) is a Swedish professional golfer who plays on the European Senior Tour. He had five European Tour wins and played in the 1999 Ryder Cup.

== Early life ==
Sandelin was born in Imatra, Finland, but grew up in Sweden and became a Swedish citizen.

== Professional career ==
Sandelin turned professional in 1987 and despite several visits to qualifying school, did not win a place on the European Tour until 1995 when he graduated from the second tier Challenge Tour by finishing in 9th place on the end of season rankings in 1994. He won the Turespana Open De Canaria during his début season as he finished in 21st place on the Order of Merit and was named the Sir Henry Cotton Rookie of the Year.

In 1996, Sandelin played on the United States–based PGA Tour, but made just one cut from 14 tournament starts during the season. He returned to Europe towards the end of the year with immediate success, winning the Madeira Island Open. He has won a total of five tournaments on the European Tour and his best season was 1999, when he won the Spanish and German Opens and finished 9th on the Order of Merit. He also made his only Ryder Cup appearance that year, but was only selected to play in the singles and lost his match against Phil Mickelson 5 and 3.

Sandelin suffered a loss of form after the turn of the century which culminated in a return to qualifying school in 2005. Having employed a coach for the first time in his career, he regained his European Tour card immediately. He managed to maintain his playing status another three years, although by small margins. In 2007 he edged out Lee Slattery for the last automatic card for 2008 by just €77. He entered the European Tour Qualifying School totally 12 times.

In May 2017, Sandelin became eligible for the European Senior Tour, from 2018 known as the Staysure Tour. The first season he played 13 tournaments, had seven top-10s, with a best tied-4th finish at the Farmfoods European Senior Masters and finished 17th on the 2017 European Senior Tour Order-of-Merit rankings. In 2018 Sandelin was runner-up in the Swiss Seniors Open and he had his first win on the senior tour in the final event of the 2019 season, the MCB Tour Championship – Mauritius, 18 years after his last European Tour win.

In 2001, he was awarded honorary member of the PGA of Sweden.

== 1997 Lancome Trophy ==
The European Tour tournament Lancome Trophy at Golf de Saint-Nom-la-Bretèche, 30 km west of Paris, France in September 1997, was won by Mark O'Meara, one stroke ahead of Sandelin. A television viewer in Sweden noted that, on the 15th green in the final round, O'Meara, facing a two and a half foot putt, had replaced his ball half an inch closer to the hole than had been indicated by his marker. Sandelin wrote to O'Meara in March 1998, sent a video recording of the incident and asked for an explanation. O'Meara insisted he had not intended to gain any advantage and sought advice from the PGA and European Tours, who informed him that the tournament was over and the result stood. O'Meara admitted in April 1998, he may, without intention, have broken the rules of golf on his way to winning the 1997 Lancome Trophy.

== Professional wins (11) ==
=== European Tour wins (5) ===
| No. | Date | Tournament | Winning score | Margin of victory | Runner(s)-up |
|---|---|---|---|---|---|
| 1 | 12 Feb 1995 | Turespaña Open De Canaria | −6 (74-72-66-70=282) | 1 stroke | (Spain) Seve Ballesteros, (England) Paul Eales |
| 2 | 31 Mar 1996 | Madeira Island Open | −9 (72-67-71-69=279) | 1 stroke | (Wales) Paul Affleck |
| 3 | 25 Apr 1999 | Peugeot Open de España | −21 (66-66-66-69=267) | 4 strokes | (Spain) Ignacio Garrido, (Spain) Miguel Ángel Jiménez, (Republic of Ireland) Paul McGinley |
| 4 | 13 Jun 1999 | German Open | −14 (69-64-73-68=274) | Playoff | (South Africa) Retief Goosen |
| 5 | 25 Nov 2001 (2002 season) | BMW Asian Open^{1} | −10 (72-66-72-68=278) | 1 stroke | (Spain) José María Olazábal, (Thailand) Thongchai Jaidee |

^{1}Co-sanctioned by the Asian PGA Tour

European Tour playoff record (1–0)

| No. | Year | Tournament | Opponent | Result |
|---|---|---|---|---|
| 1 | 1999 | German Open | (South Africa) Retief Goosen | Won with par on first extra hole |

=== Challenge Tour wins (2) ===
| No. | Date | Tournament | Winning score | Margin of victory | Runner-up |
|---|---|---|---|---|---|
| 1 | 29 Aug 1993 | Finnish PGA Championship | E (71-74-71=216) | 2 strokes | (Finland) Jouni Vilmunen |
| 2 | 11 Sep 1994 | Challenge Novotel | −10 (70-69-73-66=278) | 1 stroke | (Sweden) Fredrik Andersson |

Challenge Tour playoff record (0–2)

| No. | Year | Tournament | Opponent | Result |
|---|---|---|---|---|
| 1 | 1991 | Volvo Finnish Open | (Sweden) Fredrik Larsson | Lost to birdie on fifth extra hole |
| 2 | 1994 | Stockley Park Challenge | (England) Ricky Willison | Lost to birdie on first extra hole |

=== Other wins (2) ===
| No. | Date | Tournament | Winning score | Margin of victory | Runners-up |
|---|---|---|---|---|---|
| 1 | 18 Oct 1998 | Open Novotel Perrier (with (Sweden) Olle Karlsson) | −26 (62-68-63-136=329) | 3 strokes | (England) Richard Boxall and (England) Derrick Cooper |
| 2 | 8 Aug 2019 | Farmfoods British Par 3 Championship | −8 (53-47=100) | 1 stroke | (Scotland) Paul Lawrie, (England) Steven Tiley |

=== European Senior Tour wins (2) ===
Legend
Tour Championships (1)
Other European Senior Tour (1)

| No. | Date | Tournament | Winning score | Margin of victory | Runner-up |
|---|---|---|---|---|---|
| 1 | 15 Dec 2019 | MCB Tour Championship (Mauritius) | −12 (69-70-65=204) | 3 strokes | (South Africa) James Kingston |
| 2 | 14 Jul 2024 | Swiss Seniors Open | −10 (69-64-67=200) | 1 stroke | (Wales) Bradley Dredge |

== Results in major championships ==
| Tournament | 1995 | 1996 | 1997 | 1998 | 1999 | 2000 | 2001 |
|---|---|---|---|---|---|---|---|
| U.S. Open | | | | | | CUT | WD |
| The Open Championship | T79 | | | | 65 | T31 | |
| PGA Championship | | | | | CUT | T24 | |

Note: Sandelin never played in the Masters Tournament.

Did not play

CUT = missed the half-way cut
WD = withdrew
"T" = tied

== Results in World Golf Championships ==
| Tournament | 1999 |
|---|---|
| Match Play | |
| Championship | T20 |
| Invitational | T30 |

Did not play

"T" = Tied

== Results in senior major championships ==
Results not in chronological order

| Tournament | 2017 | 2018 | 2019 | 2020 | 2021 | 2022 | 2023 | 2024 | 2025 | 2026 |
|---|---|---|---|---|---|---|---|---|---|---|
| Senior PGA Championship | CUT | T69 | CUT | NT | CUT | | | | CUT | |
| The Tradition | | | | NT | | | | | | |
| U.S. Senior Open | | 55 | | NT | | | | | | |
| Senior Players Championship | | | | | | | | | | |
| Senior British Open Championship | T70 | 11 | T29 | NT | T28 | CUT | T25 | CUT | CUT | CUT |

Did not play

CUT = missed the halfway cut
"T" indicates a tie for a place
NT = no tournament due to COVID-19 pandemic

== Team appearances ==
- Alfred Dunhill Cup (representing Sweden): 1995, 1996, 1999
- World Cup (representing Sweden): 1995, 1996, 1999
- Ryder Cup (representing Europe): 1999
- Seve Trophy (representing Continental Europe): 2000 (winners)

== See also ==
- 1995 PGA Tour Qualifying School graduates
- 2005 European Tour Qualifying School graduates
- 2009 European Tour Qualifying School graduates
