= Alex Čejka =

Czech-German professional golfer (born 1970)

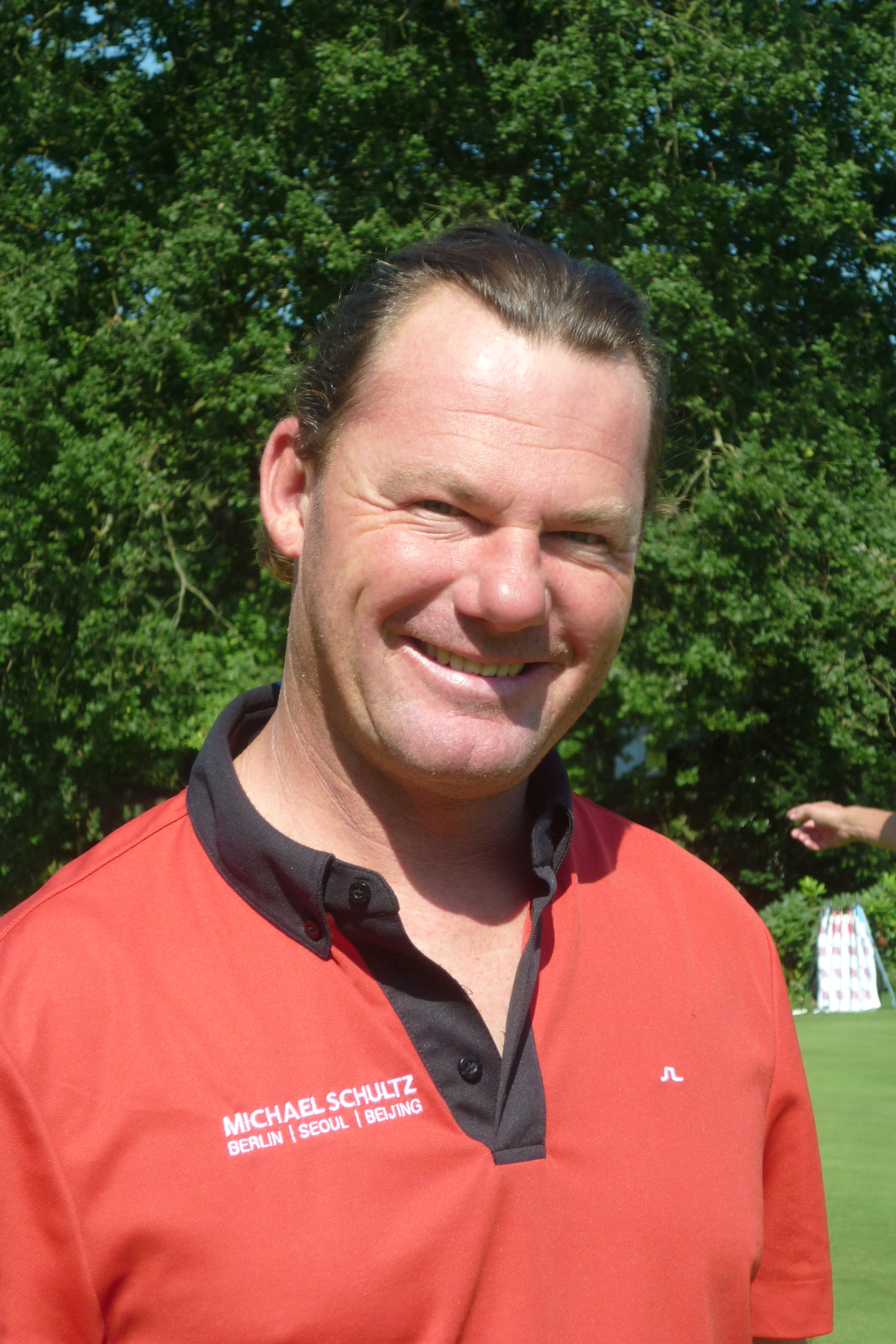
- Čejka in 2012

Personal information
- Full name: Alexander Čejka
- Nationality: Germany
- Born: 2 December 1970 (age 55) Mariánské Lázně, Czechoslovakia
- Height: 5 ft 8 in (173 cm)
- Weight: 170 lb (77 kg)

Career
- Sport: Golf
- Turned professional: 1989
- Current tours: PGA Tour Champions; European Senior Tour
- Former tours: PGA Tour; European Tour; Web.com Tour
- Professional wins: 19
- Highest ranking: 33 (7 September 2003)

Number of wins by tour
- PGA Tour: 1
- European Tour: 4
- Korn Ferry Tour: 1
- Challenge Tour: 4
- PGA Tour Champions: 4
- European Senior Tour: 3
- Other: 4

Best results in major championships
- Masters Tournament: 26th: 2004
- PGA Championship: 4th: 2003
- U.S. Open: T8: 2010
- The Open Championship: T11: 1996

Alexander Čejka (born 2 December 1970) is a Czech-German professional golfer.

Čejka was born in Mariánské Lázně, Czechoslovakia. He left the country with his parents as a refugee at the age of nine, eventually settling in Munich, where he lived for many years, becoming a West German citizen. Čejka lives in Las Vegas and also has a home in Prague.

== Professional career ==
Čejka turned professional in 1989 and played on the European Tour from 1992 to 2002. His biggest tournament win was the Turespaña Masters Open de Andalucía at Islantilla Golf Club in 1995. That year he came 6th on the European Tour's Order of Merit. Since 2003 he played mainly on the U.S. based PGA Tour. In 2003 he reached as high as No. 33 in the Official World Golf Ranking.

Čejka took a five-shot lead into the final round of the 2009 Players Championship after rounds of 66, 67 and 72. He shot a 42 on the front nine, however, en route to a 79 and an eight-stroke loss to Henrik Stenson.

He represented Germany in the World Cup 12 times, including in 2011 at Mission Hills Haikou in Hainan Island, teaming with partner Martin Kaymer to tie for second, two strokes behind the winning United States team of Matt Kuchar and Gary Woodland. Čejka teamed with Kaymer in four World Cup appearances.

In 2012 Čejka finished 177th on the PGA Tour and moved to the Web.com Tour. He finished 64th in 2013, then 6th in 2014 to earn a return to the PGA Tour.

Čejka won his first PGA Tour event in his 287th Tour start, the 2015 Puerto Rico Open. Two players bogeyed the 18th hole ensuring a five-man playoff; Čejka won with a birdie at the first playoff hole. He is the first golfer born in the Czech Republic to win a PGA Tour event and first non-American to win the Puerto Rico Open. At the time, he was also the third oldest first-time winner on the PGA Tour since 1970.

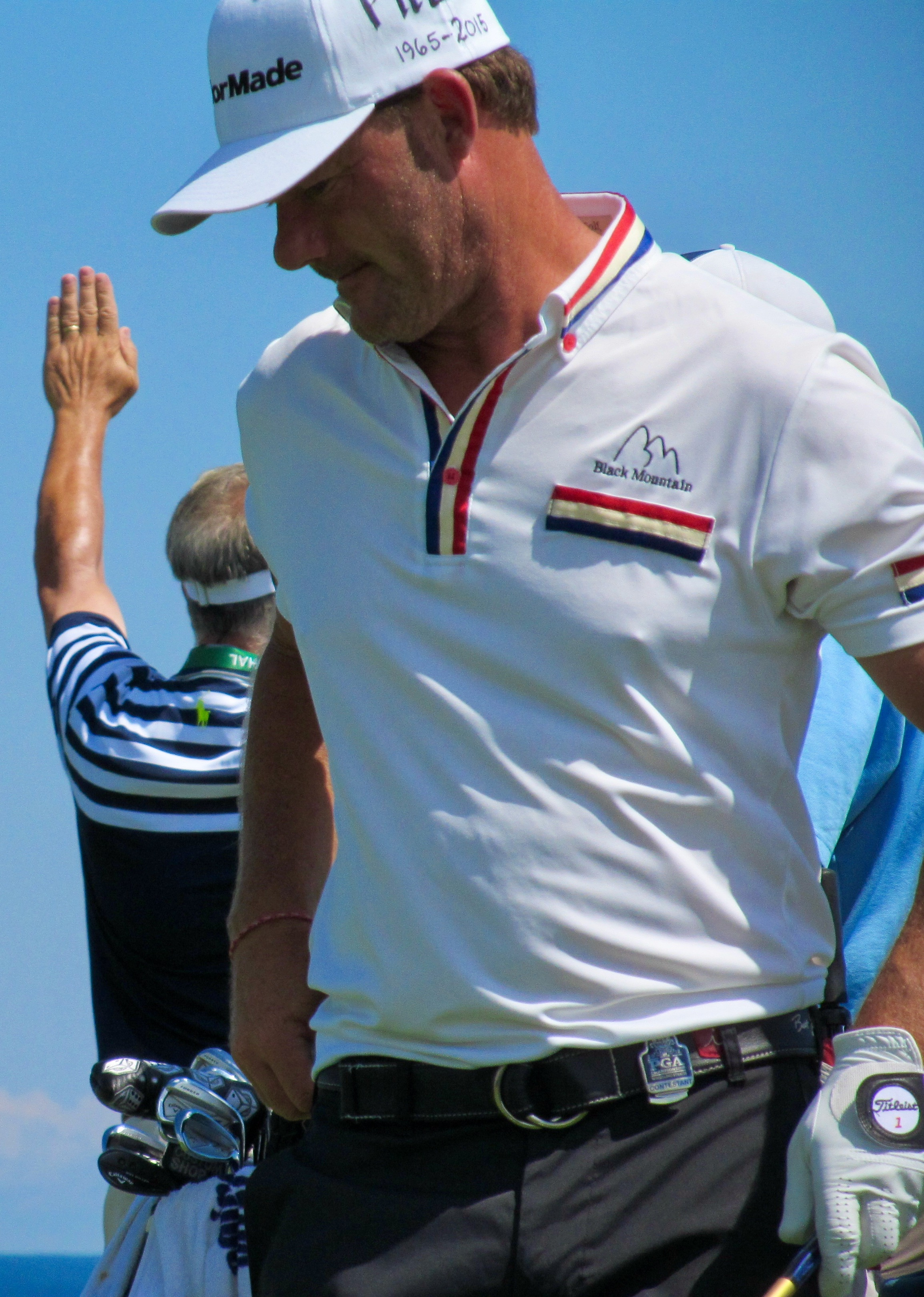
Čejka at the 2015 PGA Championship (Whistling Straits)

He competed at the 2016 Summer Olympics.

With most of the sports world on hold due to the COVID-19 pandemic, Čejka played on the Arizona-based Outlaw Tour, one of the few professional golf tours in operation during the pandemic, where he won two events.

In May 2021, Čejka won his first tournament on the PGA Tour Champions at the Regions Tradition. Čejka won this major tournament in a playoff over Steve Stricker. Three weeks later, Čejka won his second PGA Tour Champions major tournament of 2021 at the KitchenAid Senior PGA Championship at Southern Hills Country Club in Tulsa, Oklahoma. Čejka shot a final-round 67 Sunday to beat Tim Petrovic by four shots.

In July 2023, Čejka won the Senior Open Championship at Royal Porthcawl in Wales on a blustery day with wet conditions. Čejka defeated Pádraig Harrington in a playoff to win the title. This was the third win of his senior PGA Tour Champions career, with all three coming at major championships.

== Professional wins (19) ==
=== PGA Tour wins (1) ===
No.	Date	Tournament	Winning score	To par	Margin of victory	Runners-up
1	8 Mar 2015	Puerto Rico Open	70-67-75-69=281	−7	Playoff	(United States) Jon Curran, (Argentina) Emiliano Grillo, (United States) Tim Petrovic, (United States) Sam Saunders

PGA Tour playoff record (1–1)

No.	Year	Tournament	Opponents	Result
1	2015	Puerto Rico Open	(United States) Jon Curran, (Argentina) Emiliano Grillo, (United States) Tim Petrovic, (United States) Sam Saunders	Won with birdie on first extra hole
2	2017	Shriners Hospitals for Children Open	(United States) Patrick Cantlay, (South Korea) Kim Meen-whee	Cantlay won with par on second extra hole

=== European Tour wins (4) ===
Legend
Tour Championships (1)
Other European Tour (3)

No.	Date	Tournament	Winning score	To par	Margin of victory	Runner(s)-up
1	5 Mar 1995	Turespaña Masters Open de Andalucía	71-68-70-69=278	−6	3 strokes	(Italy) Costantino Rocca
2	13 Aug 1995	Hohe Brücke Open	61-68-68-70=267	−21	4 strokes	(Spain) Ignacio Garrido, (Netherlands) Rolf Muntz, (Northern Ireland) Ronan Rafferty
3	29 Oct 1995	Volvo Masters	74-66-72-70=282	−2	2 strokes	(Scotland) Colin Montgomerie
4	13 Oct 2002	Trophée Lancôme	64-68-72-68=272	−12	2 strokes	(Spain) Carlos Rodiles

=== Web.com Tour wins (1) ===
No.	Date	Tournament	Winning score	To par	Margin of victory	Runner-up
1	15 Feb 2014	Pacific Rubiales Colombia Championship	68-68-63=199 (Note: Shortened to 54 holes due to weather.)	−14	3 strokes	(United States) Andrew Putnam

=== Challenge Tour wins (4) ===
No.	Date	Tournament	Winning score	To par	Margin of victory	Runner(s)-up
1	30 Jun 1991	Audi Quattro Trophy				(England) Glyn Krause, (England) John Oates
2	25 Jul 1993	Audi Open	72-66-71=209	−7	Playoff	(England) Peter Harrison, (England) Liam White
3	8 Jun 1997	KB Golf Challenge	68-70-65-68=271	−17	2 strokes	(Italy) Michele Reale
4	16 Jun 2002	Galeria Kaufhof Pokal Challenge	66-69-68-68=271	−17	2 strokes	(England) John E. Morgan, (Germany) Marcel Siem

Challenge Tour playoff record (1–0)

No.	Year	Tournament	Opponents	Result
1	1993	Audi Open	(England) Peter Harrison, (England) Liam White	Won with par on second extra hole White eliminated by par on first hole

=== Outlaw Tour wins (2) ===
- 2020 Arrowhead Classic, Parker Open

=== Other wins (2) ===
- 1990 Czech Open
- 1992 Czech Open

=== PGA Tour Champions wins (4) ===
Legend
PGA Tour Champions major championships (3)
Other PGA Tour Champions (1)

No.	Date	Tournament	Winning score	To par	Margin of victory	Runner-up
1	9 May 2021	Regions Tradition	68-69-66-67=270	−18	Playoff	(United States) Steve Stricker
2	30 May 2021	KitchenAid Senior PGA Championship	67-70-68-67=272	−8	4 strokes	(United States) Tim Petrovic
3	30 Jul 2023	The Senior Open Championship	68-71-74-76=289	+5	Playoff	(Republic of Ireland) Pádraig Harrington
4	12 Oct 2025	SAS Championship	70-66-71=207	−9	3 strokes	(South Africa) Ernie Els

PGA Tour Champions playoff record (2–1)

No.	Year	Tournament	Opponent	Result
1	2021	Regions Tradition	(United States) Steve Stricker	Won with birdie on first extra hole
2	2023	The Senior Open Championship	(Republic of Ireland) Pádraig Harrington	Won with birdie on second extra hole
3	2026	Constellation Furyk and Friends	(United States) Vaughn Taylor	Lost to birdie on second extra hole

=== European Senior Tour wins (3) ===
Legend
Senior major championships (2)
Other European Senior Tour (1)

No.	Date	Tournament	Winning score	To par	Margin of victory	Runner-up
1	30 May 2021	KitchenAid Senior PGA Championship	67-70-68-67=272	−8	4 strokes	(United States) Tim Petrovic
2	31 Jul 2022	JCB Championship	69-66-70=205	−11	2 strokes	(Republic of Ireland) Paul McGinley
3	30 Jul 2023	The Senior Open Championship	68-71-74-76=289	+5	Playoff	(Republic of Ireland) Pádraig Harrington

European Senior Tour playoff record (1–0)

No.	Year	Tournament	Opponent	Result
1	2023	The Senior Open Championship	(Republic of Ireland) Pádraig Harrington	Won with birdie on second extra hole

== Results in major championships ==
Results not in chronological order in 2020.

Tournament	1996	1997	1998	1999
Masters Tournament	44			
U.S. Open	T50			
The Open Championship	T11	CUT		
PGA Championship	T52			T65

Tournament	2000	2001	2002	2003	2004	2005	2006	2007	2008	2009
Masters Tournament					26					
U.S. Open				T61	T60					
The Open Championship	CUT	T13	CUT			CUT			CUT	
PGA Championship				4	CUT	CUT				

Tournament	2010	2011	2012	2013	2014	2015	2016	2017	2018
Masters Tournament		T35							
U.S. Open	T8	CUT	T41		T60				
The Open Championship									
PGA Championship						WD			

Tournament	2019	2020	2021	2022	2023	2024
Masters Tournament						
PGA Championship				CUT		
U.S. Open						
The Open Championship		NT				T75

Top 10
Did not play

CUT = missed the half-way cut
WD = withdrew
"T" = tied
NT = no tournament due to COVID-19 pandemic

=== Summary ===
Tournament	Wins	2nd	3rd	Top-5	Top-10	Top-25	Events	Cuts made
Masters Tournament	0	0	0	0	0	0	3	3
U.S. Open	0	0	0	0	1	1	7	6
The Open Championship	0	0	0	0	0	2	8	3
PGA Championship	0	0	0	1	1	1	7	3
Totals	0	0	0	1	2	4	25	15

- Most consecutive cuts made – 4 (twice)
- Longest streak of top-10s – 1 (twice)

== Results in The Players Championship ==
Tournament	2004	2005	2006	2007	2008	2009
The Players Championship	T33	T12			CUT	T9

Tournament	2010	2011	2012	2013	2014	2015	2016	2017	2018	2019
The Players Championship	T58	CUT				74	T9	T79		CUT

Top 10
Did not play

CUT = missed the halfway cut
"T" indicates a tie for a place

== Results in World Golf Championships ==
Tournament	1999	2000	2001	2002	2003	2004	2005
Match Play					R16	R32	R64
Championship	T55		NT^{1}		T12	T28	
Invitational					T42	T9	

^{1}Cancelled due to 9/11

Top 10
Did not play

QF, R16, R32, R64 = Round in which player lost in match play
"T" = Tied
NT = No tournament

== Senior major championships ==
=== Wins (3) ===
Year	Championship	54 holes	Winning score	Margin	Runner-up
2021	Regions Tradition	1 shot deficit	−18 (68-69-66-67=270)	Playoff	(United States) Steve Stricker
2021	KitchenAid Senior PGA Championship	1 shot deficit	−8 (67-70-68-67=272)	4 strokes	(United States) Tim Petrovic
2023	Senior Open Championship	1 shot deficit	+5 (68-71-74-76=289)	Playoff	(Republic of Ireland) Pádraig Harrington

=== Results timeline ===
Results not in chronological order

Tournament	2021	2022	2023	2024	2025	2026
Senior PGA Championship	1	13	T12		T46	CUT
The Tradition	1	DQ	T9		T12	T5
U.S. Senior Open	T26	T13	T9	T16	T26	T14
Senior Players Championship		T5	T9		T33	T20
The Senior Open Championship	T18	T12	1	T15	T14	T14

Win
Top 10
Did not play

CUT = missed the halfway cut
DQ = disqualified
"T" indicates a tie for a place

== Team appearances ==
- Alfred Dunhill Cup (representing Germany): 1994, 1995, 1997, 1998
- World Cup (representing Germany): 1995, 1996, 1997, 2000, 2002, 2003, 2005, 2007, 2008, 2009, 2011, 2016
- Seve Trophy (representing Continental Europe): 2000 (winners), 2002, 2003

== See also ==
- 2002 PGA Tour Qualifying School graduates
- 2005 PGA Tour Qualifying School graduates
- 2006 PGA Tour Qualifying School graduates
- 2006 European Tour Qualifying School graduates
- 2014 Web.com Tour Finals graduates
- 2017 Web.com Tour Finals graduates
- List of golfers with most Challenge Tour wins
