= 1995 Dunhill Cup =

Coordinates: 56.351484°N 2.816147°W

Tournament information
- Dates: 19–22 October
- Location: St Andrews, Scotland
- Course(s): Old Course at St Andrews
- Format: Match play

Statistics
- Par: 72
- Length: 6,933 yards (6,340 m)
- Field: 16 teams of 3 players
- Prize fund: US$1,500,000
- Winner's share: US$450,000

Champion
- Scotland (Andrew Coltart, Colin Montgomerie, Sam Torrance)

The 1995 Dunhill Cup was the 11th Dunhill Cup. It was a team tournament featuring 16 countries, each represented by three players. The Cup was played 19–22 October at the Old Course at St Andrews in Scotland. The sponsor was the Alfred Dunhill company. The Scottish team of Andrew Coltart, Colin Montgomerie, and Sam Torrance beat the Zimbabwean team of Tony Johnstone, Mark McNulty, and Nick Price in the final.

== Format ==
The Cup was a match play event played over four days. The teams were divided into four four-team groups. The top eight teams were seeded with the remaining teams randomly placed in the groups. After three rounds of round-robin play, the top team in each group advanced to a single elimination playoff.

In each team match, the three players were paired with their opponents and played 18 holes at medal match play. Matches tied at the end of 18 holes were extended to a sudden-death playoff. The tie-breaker for ties within a group was based on match record, then head-to-head.

== Group play ==
=== Round one ===
Group 1

| United States – 0 | | Ireland – 3 | |
| Player | Score | Player | Score |
|---|---|---|---|
| Lee Janzen | 73 | Darren Clarke | 71 |
| Ben Crenshaw | 71 | Ronan Rafferty | 70 |
| Peter Jacobsen | 73 | Philip Walton | 72 |

| Sweden – 3 | | Canada – 0 | |
| Player | Score | Player | Score |
|---|---|---|---|
| Jesper Parnevik | 70 | Dave Barr | 77 |
| Jarmo Sandelin | 72 | Ray Stewart | 73 |
| Per-Ulrik Johansson | 69 | Rick Gibson | 71 |

Group 2

| Scotland – 3 | | Taiwan – 0 | |
| Player | Score | Player | Score |
|---|---|---|---|
| Andrew Coltart | 66 | Chen Liang-hsi | 73 |
| Sam Torrance | 75 | Lu Wen-teh | 81 |
| Colin Montgomerie | 71 | Chung Chun-hsing | 80 |

| South Africa – 2 | | Germany – 1 | |
| Player | Score | Player | Score |
|---|---|---|---|
| Retief Goosen | 70 | Heinz-Peter Thül | 72 |
| David Frost | 74 | Sven Strüver | 73 |
| Ernie Els | 70 | Alex Čejka | 72 |

Group 3

| New Zealand – 2 | | Japan – 1 | |
| Player | Score | Player | Score |
|---|---|---|---|
| Michael Campbell | 68 | Hideki Kase | 73 |
| Frank Nobilo | 71 | Tsukasa Watanabe | 75 |
| Greg Turner | 73 | Nobuo Serizawa | 72 |

| Zimbabwe – 3 | | Wales – 0 | |
| Player | Score | Player | Score |
|---|---|---|---|
| Tony Johnstone | 73 | Mark Mouland | 75 |
| Nick Price | 67 | Paul Affleck | 70 |
| Mark McNulty | 69 | Ian Woosnam | 74 |

Group 4

| Australia – 2 | | Argentina – 1 | |
| Player | Score | Player | Score |
|---|---|---|---|
| Greg Norman | 75 | José Cóceres | 72 |
| Steve Elkington | 72 | Eduardo Romero | 74 |
| Craig Parry | 70 | Vicente Fernández | 71 |

| England – 1 | | Spain – 2 | |
| Player | Score | Player | Score |
|---|---|---|---|
| Barry Lane | 74 | José Rivero | 75 |
| Mark James | 77 | Miguel Ángel Jiménez | 73 |
| Howard Clark | 76 | Ignacio Garrido | 75 |

=== Round two ===
Group 1

| Ireland – 2 | | Canada – 1 | |
| Player | Score | Player | Score |
|---|---|---|---|
| Darren Clarke | 69 | Rick Gibson | 73 |
| Philip Walton | 71 | Ray Stewart | 73 |
| Ronan Rafferty | 72 | Dave Barr | 71 |

| United States – 2 | | Sweden – 1 | |
| Player | Score | Player | Score |
|---|---|---|---|
| Peter Jacobsen | 67 | Jesper Parnevik | 71 |
| Ben Crenshaw | 67 | Jarmo Sandelin | 69 |
| Lee Janzen | 72 | Per-Ulrik Johansson | 72 |

Johannsson won on the first playoff hole.

Group 2

| South Africa – 3 | | Taiwan – 0 | |
| Player | Score | Player | Score |
|---|---|---|---|
| Retief Goosen | 73 | Chung Chun-hsing | 77 |
| David Frost | 68 | Lu Wen-teh | 75 |
| Ernie Els | 70 | Chen Liang-hsi | 72 |

| Scotland – 3 | | Germany – 0 | |
| Player | Score | Player | Score |
|---|---|---|---|
| Andrew Coltart | 68 | Alex Čejka | 70 |
| Sam Torrance | 71 | Heinz-Peter Thül | 74 |
| Colin Montgomerie | 72 | Sven Strüver | 73 |

Group 3

| New Zealand – 0 | | Wales – 3 | |
| Player | Score | Player | Score |
|---|---|---|---|
| Michael Campbell | 71 | Ian Woosnam | 68 |
| Greg Turner | 74 | Mark Mouland | 71 |
| Frank Nobilo | 70 | Paul Affleck | 69 |

| Zimbabwe – 2 | | Japan – 1 | |
| Player | Score | Player | Score |
|---|---|---|---|
| Tony Johnstone | 73 | Tsukasa Watanabe | 71 |
| Mark McNulty | 66 | Hideki Kase | 73 |
| Nick Price | 68 | Nobuo Serizawa | 71 |

Group 4

| England – 1 | | Argentina – 2 | |
| Player | Score | Player | Score |
|---|---|---|---|
| Barry Lane | 76 | Vicente Fernández | 68 |
| Mark James | 74 | José Cóceres | 73 |
| Howard Clark | 69 | Eduardo Romero | 72 |

| Australia – 2 | | Spain – 1 | |
| Player | Score | Player | Score |
|---|---|---|---|
| Greg Norman | 67 | Miguel Ángel Jiménez | 68 |
| Steve Elkington | 72 | José Rivero | 70 |
| Craig Parry | 67 | Ignacio Garrido | 70 |

=== Round three ===
Group 1

| United States – 1 | | Canada – 2 | |
| Player | Score | Player | Score |
|---|---|---|---|
| Peter Jacobsen | 71 | Ray Stewart | 71 |
| Lee Janzen | 73 | Rick Gibson | 72 |
| Ben Crenshaw | 68 | Dave Barr | 72 |

Stewart won on the first playoff hole.

| Ireland – 2 | | Sweden – 1 | |
| Player | Score | Player | Score |
|---|---|---|---|
| Darren Clarke | 70 | Jarmo Sandelin | 67 |
| Philip Walton | 72 | Jesper Parnevik | 72 |
| Ronan Rafferty | 68 | Per-Ulrik Johansson | 71 |

Walton won on the first playoff hole.

Group 2

| Scotland – 2 | | South Africa – 1 | |
| Player | Score | Player | Score |
|---|---|---|---|
| Andrew Coltart | 75 | Ernie Els | 70 |
| Sam Torrance | 68 | Retief Goosen | 70 |
| Colin Montgomerie | 69 | David Frost | 71 |

| Germany – 2 | | Taiwan – 1 | |
| Player | Score | Player | Score |
|---|---|---|---|
| Sven Strüver | 68 | Chung Chun-hsing | 75 |
| Heinz-Peter Thül | 77 | Lu Wen-teh | 78 |
| Alex Čejka | 70 | Chen Liang-hsi | 68 |

Group 3

| Wales – 2 | | Japan – 1 | |
| Player | Score | Player | Score |
|---|---|---|---|
| Ian Woosnam | 72 | Hideki Kase | 73 |
| Mark Mouland | 71 | Tsukasa Watanabe | 70 |
| Paul Affleck | 69 | Nobuo Serizawa | 71 |

| Zimbabwe – 3 | | New Zealand – 0 | |
| Player | Score | Player | Score |
|---|---|---|---|
| Tony Johnstone | 73 | Greg Turner | 74 |
| Nick Price | 68 | Frank Nobilo | 71 |
| Mark McNulty | 70 | Michael Campbell | 72 |

Group 4

| Spain – 2 | | Argentina – 1 | |
| Player | Score | Player | Score |
|---|---|---|---|
| Miguel Ángel Jiménez | 74 | Vicente Fernández | 68 |
| José Rivero | 70 | Eduardo Romero | 72 |
| Ignacio Garrido | 71 | José Cóceres | 73 |

| Australia – 0 | | England – 3 | |
| Player | Score | Player | Score |
|---|---|---|---|
| Steve Elkington | 73 | Barry Lane | 72 |
| Greg Norman | 69 | Mark James | 68 |
| Craig Parry | 70 | Howard Clark | 69 |

=== Standings ===
Group 1
| Country | W | L | MW | ML |
|---|---|---|---|---|
| Ireland | 3 | 0 | 7 | 2 |
| Sweden | 1 | 2 | 5 | 4 |
| Canada | 1 | 2 | 3 | 6 |
| United States | 1 | 2 | 3 | 6 |

Group 2
| Country | W | L | MW | ML |
|---|---|---|---|---|
| Scotland | 3 | 0 | 8 | 1 |
| South Africa | 2 | 1 | 6 | 3 |
| Germany | 1 | 2 | 3 | 6 |
| Taiwan | 0 | 3 | 1 | 8 |

Group 3
| Country | W | L | MW | ML |
|---|---|---|---|---|
| Zimbabwe | 3 | 0 | 8 | 1 |
| Wales | 2 | 1 | 5 | 4 |
| New Zealand | 1 | 2 | 2 | 7 |
| Japan | 0 | 3 | 3 | 6 |

Group 4
| Country | W | L | MW | ML |
|---|---|---|---|---|
| Spain | 2 | 1 | 5 | 4 |
| Australia | 2 | 1 | 4 | 5 |
| England | 1 | 2 | 5 | 4 |
| Argentina | 1 | 2 | 4 | 5 |

== Playoffs ==
=== Bracket ===
Semi-finals
3 | Zimbabwe | 2
Spain | 1
4 | Scotland | 2
8 | Ireland | 1

Final
3 | Zimbabwe | 1
4 | Scotland | 2

=== Semi-finals ===
| Scotland – 2 | | Ireland – 1 | |
| Player | Score | Player | Score |
|---|---|---|---|
| Colin Montgomerie | 70 | Darren Clarke | 72 |
| Andrew Coltart | 75 | Philip Walton | 76 |
| Sam Torrance | 74 | Ronan Rafferty | 73 |

| Zimbabwe – 2 | | Spain – 1 | |
| Player | Score | Player | Score |
|---|---|---|---|
| Tony Johnstone | 71 | Miguel Ángel Jiménez | 70 |
| Nick Price | 69 | José Rivero | 70 |
| Mark McNulty | 73 | Ignacio Garrido | DQ |

=== Final ===
| Zimbabwe – 1 | | Scotland – 2 | |
| Player | Score | Player | Score |
|---|---|---|---|
| Tony Johnstone | 71 | Andrew Coltart | 67 |
| Mark McNulty | 70 | Sam Torrance | 68 |
| Nick Price | 68 | Colin Montgomerie | 74 |

== Team results ==
| Country | Place | W | L | MW | ML | Seed |
|---|---|---|---|---|---|---|
| Scotland | 1 | 5 | 0 | 12 | 3 | 4 |
| Zimbabwe | 2 | 4 | 1 | 11 | 4 | 3 |
| Ireland | T3 | 3 | 1 | 8 | 4 | 8 |
| Spain | T3 | 2 | 2 | 6 | 6 | |
| South Africa | T5 | 2 | 1 | 6 | 3 | 5 |
| Wales | T5 | 2 | 1 | 5 | 4 | |
| Australia | T5 | 2 | 1 | 4 | 5 | 2 |
| England | T8 | 1 | 2 | 5 | 4 | 7 |
| Sweden | T8 | 1 | 2 | 5 | 4 | |
| Argentina | T8 | 1 | 2 | 4 | 5 | |
| Canada | T8 | 1 | 2 | 3 | 6 | |
| Germany | T8 | 1 | 2 | 3 | 6 | |
| United States | T8 | 1 | 2 | 3 | 6 | 1 |
| New Zealand | T8 | 1 | 2 | 2 | 7 | 6 |
| Japan | T15 | 0 | 3 | 3 | 6 | |
| Taiwan | T15 | 0 | 3 | 1 | 8 | |

== Player results ==
| Country | Player | W | L |
|---|---|---|---|
| Scotland | Andrew Coltart | 4 | 1 |
| Scotland | Colin Montgomerie | 4 | 1 |
| Scotland | Sam Torrance | 4 | 1 |
| Zimbabwe | Nick Price | 5 | 0 |
| Zimbabwe | Mark McNulty | 4 | 1 |
| Zimbabwe | Tony Johnstone | 2 | 3 |
| Ireland | Ronan Rafferty | 3 | 1 |
| Ireland | Philip Walton | 3 | 1 |
| Ireland | Darren Clarke | 2 | 2 |
| Spain | Ignacio Garrido | 2 | 2 |
| Spain | Miguel Ángel Jiménez | 2 | 2 |
| Spain | José Rivero | 2 | 2 |
| South Africa | Ernie Els | 3 | 0 |
| South Africa | Retief Goosen | 2 | 1 |
| South Africa | David Frost | 1 | 2 |
| Wales | Paul Affleck | 2 | 1 |
| Wales | Ian Woosnam | 2 | 1 |
| Wales | Mark Mouland | 1 | 2 |
| Australia | Craig Parry | 2 | 1 |
| Australia | Steve Elkington | 1 | 2 |
| Australia | Greg Norman | 1 | 2 |
| England | Howard Clark | 2 | 1 |
| England | Barry Lane | 2 | 1 |
| England | Mark James | 1 | 2 |
| Sweden | Per-Ulrik Johansson | 2 | 1 |
| Sweden | Jarmo Sandelin | 2 | 1 |
| Sweden | Jesper Parnevik | 1 | 2 |
| Argentina | José Cóceres | 2 | 1 |
| Argentina | Vicente Fernández | 2 | 1 |
| Argentina | Eduardo Romero | 0 | 3 |
| Canada | Dave Barr | 1 | 2 |
| Canada | Rick Gibson | 1 | 2 |
| Canada | Ray Stewart | 1 | 2 |
| Germany | Sven Strüver | 2 | 1 |
| Germany | Heinz-Peter Thül | 1 | 2 |
| Germany | Alex Čejka | 0 | 3 |
| United States | Ben Crenshaw | 2 | 1 |
| United States | Peter Jacobsen | 1 | 2 |
| United States | Lee Janzen | 0 | 3 |
| New Zealand | Michael Campbell | 1 | 2 |
| New Zealand | Frank Nobilo | 1 | 2 |
| New Zealand | Greg Turner | 0 | 3 |
| Japan | Tsukasa Watanabe | 2 | 1 |
| Japan | Nobuo Serizawa | 1 | 2 |
| Japan | Hideki Kase | 0 | 3 |
| Taiwan | Chen Liang-hsi | 1 | 2 |
| Taiwan | Chung Chun-hsing | 0 | 3 |
| Taiwan | Lu Wen-teh | 0 | 3 |
