= Open Novotel Perrier =

Golf tournament held in France

The Open Novotel Perrier was a golf tournament held in France that was played between 1994 and 1998. It was an unofficial money event on the European Tour and was a pairs tournament played in a combination of fourball, foursome and greensome formats.

== Winners ==
Year	Venue	Winner	Country	Score
Open Novotel Perrier
1998	Golf du Médoc	Olle Karlsson & Jarmo Sandelin	Sweden	329
1997	Golf du Médoc	Anders Forsbrand & Michael Jonzon	Sweden	343
1996	Golf du Médoc	Steven Bottomley & Jonathan Lomas	England	332
Tournoi Perrier de Paris
1995	Golf de Saint-Cloud	Seve Ballesteros & José María Olazábal	Spain	256
1994	Golf de Saint-Cloud	Peter Baker & David J. Russell	England	260
