= Sven Strüver =

German professional golfer (born 1967)

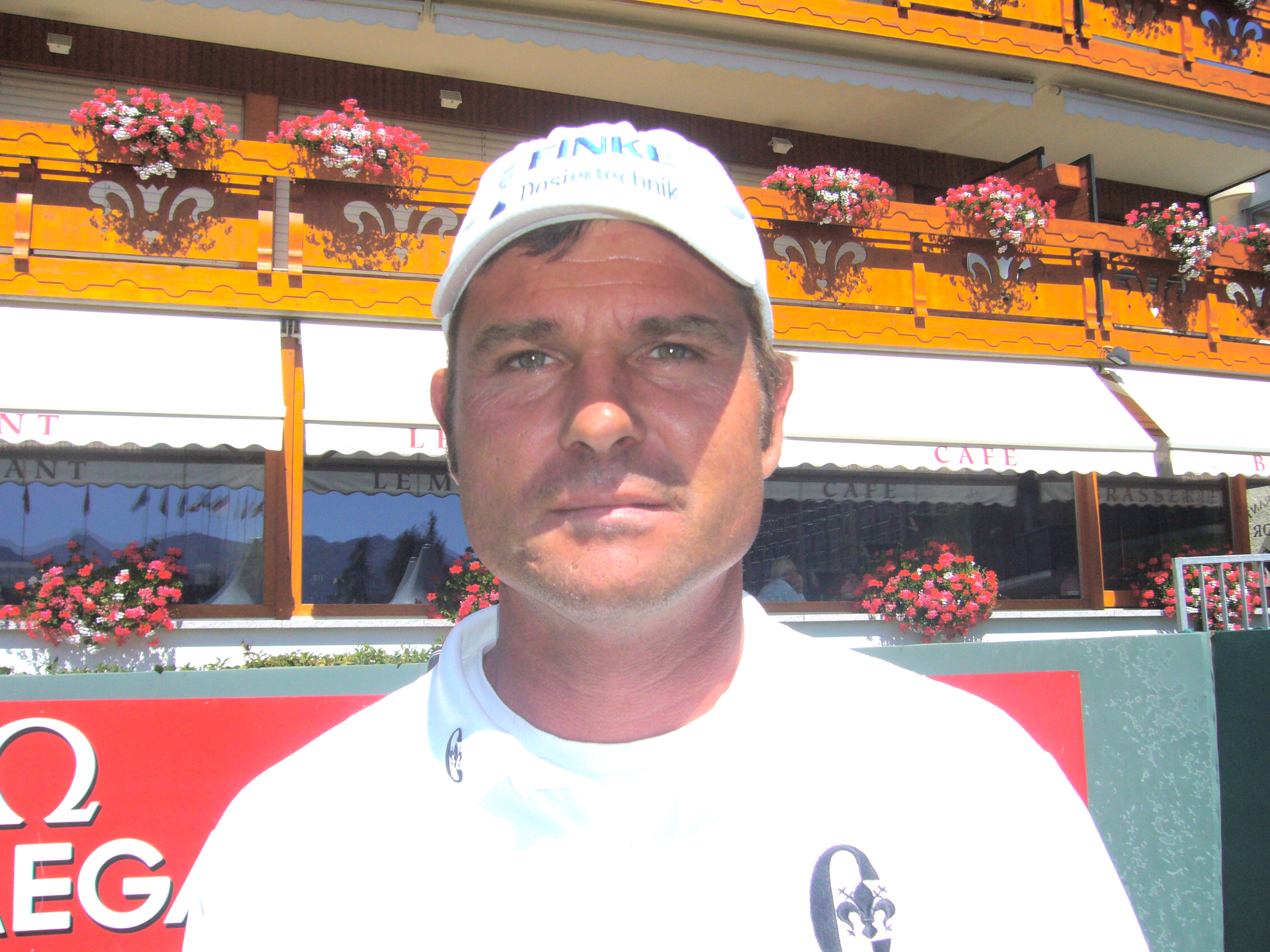
- Strüver at the 2009 Omega European Masters

Personal information
- Nationality: Germany
- Born: 9 August 1967 (age 59) Bremen, Germany
- Height: 1.83 m (6 ft 0 in)
- Spouse: Stephanie (m. 1996)
- Children: 2

Career
- Sport: Golf
- Turned professional: 1990
- Former tours: European Tour; Challenge Tour
- Professional wins: 5

Number of wins by tour
- European Tour: 3
- Other: 2

Best results in major championships
- Masters Tournament: DNP
- PGA Championship: CUT: 1999
- U.S. Open: T32: 1999
- The Open Championship: T35: 1998

Sven Strüver (born 9 August 1967) is a German professional golfer.

== Early life and amateur career ==
In 1967, Strüver was born in Bremen. In the 1989 German Open, he shot a 62 in the second round to set a new record for the lowest round by an amateur in a European Tour event. The record was equalled by Shane Lowry in the 2009 Irish Open.

After reaching the final in the 1990 Spanish International Amateur Championship, losing to Darren Clarke.

== Professional career ==
In 1990, Strüver turned professional in and won the German PGA Championship that year. He joined the European Tour in 1992, and reached his peak during the mid to late 1990s, when he won three tournaments and consistently finished inside the top 50 on the Order of Merit. His best season was 1998, when he captured the Canon European Masters and finished 13th on the Order of Merit having missed just two cuts all season.

Since 2003, Strüver has failed to win enough money to retain his European Tour card automatically and visited the end of season tour qualifying school every year through 2007, regaining his card on three occasions.

== Amateur wins ==
- 1986 German Amateur Closed Championship

== Professional wins (5) ==
=== European Tour wins (3) ===
No.	Date	Tournament	Winning score	Margin of victory	Runner(s)-up
1	18 Feb 1996	Alfred Dunhill South African PGA Championship^{1}	−14 (66-73-63=202) (Note: Shortened to 54 holes due to weather.)	3 strokes	(South Africa) Ernie Els, (Northern Ireland) David Feherty
2	27 Jul 1997	Sun Microsystems Dutch Open	−18 (67-64-69-66=266)	3 strokes	(England) Russell Claydon
3	6 Sep 1998	Canon European Masters	−21 (69-63-65-66=263)	Playoff	(Sweden) Patrik Sjöland

^{1}Co-sanctioned by the Southern Africa Tour

European Tour playoff record (1–0)

No.	Year	Tournament	Opponent	Result
1	1998	Canon European Masters	(Sweden) Patrik Sjöland	Won with birdie on first extra hole

=== Other wins (2) ===
No.	Date	Tournament	Winning score	Margin of victory	Runners-up
1	1990	German PGA Championship			
2	16 May 1993	American Express Trophy	−16 (71-73-69-65=268)	6 strokes	(Germany) Alex Čejka, (Germany) Uli Zilg

== Results in major championships ==
Tournament	1998	1999	2000	2001	2002	2003	2004
U.S. Open		T32					
The Open Championship	T35	66					CUT
PGA Championship		CUT					

Note: Strüver never played in the Masters Tournament.

Did not play

CUT = missed the half-way cut
"T" = tied

== Team appearances ==
Amateur

- European Boys' Team Championship (representing West Germany): 1985
- Eisenhower Trophy (representing West Germany): 1986, 1988
- European Amateur Team Championship (representing West Germany): 1987, 1989
- St Andrews Trophy (representing the Continent of Europe): 1988

Professional

- World Cup (representing Germany): 1993, 1994, 1995, 1997, 1998, 1999, 2002
- Alfred Dunhill Cup (representing Germany): 1994, 1995, 1996, 1997, 1998, 2000

== See also ==
- 2006 European Tour Qualifying School graduates
- 2007 European Tour Qualifying School graduates
