= Paul Eales =

English golfer (born 1963)

Personal information
- Full name: Paul Martyn Eales
- Nationality: England
- Born: 2 August 1963 (age 63) Epping, Essex, England
- Height: 1.73 m (5 ft 8 in)
- Weight: 67 kg (148 lb; 10.6 st)
- Spouse: Sharon
- Children: 1

Career
- Sport: Golf
- Turned professional: 1985
- Current tour: European Senior Tour
- Former tours: European Tour; Sunshine Tour; Challenge Tour
- Professional wins: 4

Number of wins by tour
- European Tour: 1
- Challenge Tour: 1
- European Senior Tour: 1
- Other: 1

Best results in major championships
- Masters Tournament: DNP
- PGA Championship: DNP
- U.S. Open: CUT: 1996
- The Open Championship: T47: 2002

Paul Martyn Eales (born 2 August 1963) is an English professional golfer.

== Career ==
Eales was born in Epping, Essex. He turned professional in 1985 and became a member of Europe's second tier Challenge Tour in 1990. The following season he won the Audi Open, and in 1992 finished third on the Challenge Tour Rankings to graduate to the main European Tour for the 1993 season.

After a solid rookie season in 1993, Eales won the 1994 Extremadura Open on his way to a career best 35th place on the European Tour Order of Merit. He performed consistently, but without winning again, mostly finishing within the top 100 on the Order of Merit until 2004, when he lost his tour card.

Eales was the assistant professional to Eddie Birchenough at Royal Lytham & St Annes Golf Club, where he first became an assistant in 1987.

Eales is now playing on the European Senior Tour. He won the Scottish Senior Open in August 2016 and the Jamaica Open in January 2017.

Eales is a Non-Executive Board member of the European Tour. He regularly works as a broadcaster and golf analyst for various media companies including BBC Radio 5 Live and Sky Sports.

== Professional wins (4) ==
=== European Tour wins (1) ===
No.	Date	Tournament	Winning score	Margin of victory	Runner-up
1	20 Feb 1994	Extremadura Open	−7 (72-69-69-71=281)	1 stroke	(Sweden) Peter Hedblom

=== Challenge Tour wins (1) ===
No.	Date	Tournament	Winning score	Margin of victory	Runner-up
1	4 Aug 1991	Audi Open	−13 (71-70-70-64=275)	2 strokes	(Denmark) Jacob Rasmussen

=== Other wins (1) ===
No.	Date	Tournament	Winning score	Margin of victory	Runner-up
1	14 Jan 2017	Jamaica Open	−1 (68-72-75=215)	1 stroke	(United States) Tom Gillis

=== European Senior Tour wins (1) ===
No.	Date	Tournament	Winning score	Margin of victory	Runners-up
1	21 Aug 2016	Prostate Cancer UK Scottish Senior Open	−11 (68-69-68=205)	1 stroke	(Australia) Peter Fowler, (Spain) Santiago Luna

== Results in major championships ==
Tournament	1989	1990	1991	1992	1993	1994	1995	1996	1997	1998	1999	2000	2001	2002
U.S. Open								CUT						
The Open Championship	CUT				CUT	CUT		CUT			CUT	CUT		T47

Note: Eales never played in the Masters Tournament or the PGA Championship.

Did not play

CUT = missed the half-way cut
"T" = tied
