= Brasil Open (disambiguation) =

The Brasil Open (2001–2019) was a men's tennis tournament held in São Paulo, Brazil.

Brasil Open or Brazil Open may also refer to:

== Tennis ==
- WTA Brasil Open (1977–2002), a series of women's tournaments held in Brazil
- SP Open (2025–), a women's tournament held in São Paulo, Brazil

== Golf ==
- Brazil Open (golf) (1945–), a tournament held in Rio de Janeiro, Brazil
- Brazil Rio de Janeiro 500 Years Open (2000), a tournament held to commemorate the discovery of Brazil
- Brazil São Paulo 500 Years Open (2000–2001), a tournament held to commemorate the discovery of Brazil
