= 2001 European Tour =

Golf tour season

2001 European Tour season
- Duration: 16 November 2000 – 11 November 2001
- Number of official events: 46 (Note: A further two tournaments were scheduled but were cancelled.)
- Most wins: (South Africa) Retief Goosen (3) (Note: Tiger Woods won four events, but was not a European Tour member.)
- Order of Merit: (South Africa) Retief Goosen
- Golfer of the Year: (South Africa) Retief Goosen
- Sir Henry Cotton Rookie of the Year: (England) Paul Casey

The 2001 European Tour, titled as the 2001 PGA European Tour, was the 30th season of the European Tour, the main professional golf tour in Europe since its inaugural season in 1972.

== Changes for 2001 ==
There were several changes from the previous season, with the Dunhill Links Championship replacing the Dunhill Cup, the Open de Madrid replacing the Turespaña Masters, the Standard Life Loch Lomond being rebranded as the revived Scottish Open, the addition the Caltex Singapore Masters, the Argentine Open and the São Paulo Brazil Open; the return of the Estoril Open; and the loss of the Brazil Rio de Janeiro 500 Years Open and the Belgian Open.

The terrorist attacks in the United States on 11 September led to changes on the tour schedule with the WGC-American Express Championship being cancelled and the Ryder Cup matches at The Belfry being postponed until 2002. The Estoril Open was also cancelled in the wake of the attacks and was replaced on the schedule with a revival of the Cannes Open.

== Schedule ==
The following table lists official events during the 2001 season.

Date	Tournament	Host country	Purse	Winner (Note: The number in brackets after each winner's name is the number of European Tour events they had won up to and including that tournament. This information is only shown for European Tour members and are inclusive of the three United States-based major championships which were included on the schedule for the first time in 1998, with earlier editions having retrospectively been recognised as official tour wins.)	OWGR points	Other tours (Note: AFR − Sunshine Tour; ANZ − PGA Tour of Australasia; ARG − PGA of Argentina Tour; ASA − Asian PGA Tour; CHA − Challenge Tour.)	Notes
19 Nov	Johnnie Walker Classic	Thailand	£800,000	(United States) Tiger Woods (n/a)	24	ANZ, ASA	
7 Jan	WGC-Accenture Match Play Championship	Australia	US$5,000,000	(United States) Steve Stricker (n/a)	58		World Golf Championship
21 Jan	Alfred Dunhill Championship	South Africa	£500,000	(Australia) Adam Scott (1)	18	AFR	
28 Jan	Mercedes-Benz South African Open	South Africa	US$1,000,000	(Zimbabwe) Mark McNulty (16)	32	AFR (Note: Sunshine Tour flagship event)	
4 Feb	Heineken Classic	Australia	A$1,750,000	(New Zealand) Michael Campbell (4)	20	ANZ	
11 Feb	Greg Norman Holden International	Australia	A$2,000,000	(Australia) Aaron Baddeley (n/a)	22	ANZ	
18 Feb	Carlsberg Malaysian Open	Malaysia	US$910,000	(Fiji) Vijay Singh (10)	18	ASA	
25 Feb	Caltex Singapore Masters	Singapore	US$850,000	(Fiji) Vijay Singh (11)	24	ASA	New tournament
4 Mar	Dubai Desert Classic	UAE	US$1,500,000	(Denmark) Thomas Bjørn (6)	44		
11 Mar	Qatar Masters	Qatar	US$750,000	(Zimbabwe) Tony Johnstone (6)	24		
18 Mar	Madeira Island Open	Portugal	€550,000	(Republic of Ireland) Des Smyth (8)	24		
25 Mar	São Paulo Brazil Open	Brazil	€750,000	(South Africa) Darren Fichardt (1)	24		
1 Apr	Open de Argentina	Argentina	US$700,000	(Argentina) Ángel Cabrera (1)	24	ARG	New to European Tour
8 Apr	Masters Tournament	United States	US$5,600,000	(United States) Tiger Woods (n/a)	100		Major championship
15 Apr	Moroccan Open	Morocco	€650,000	(England) Ian Poulter (2)	24		
22 Apr	Via Digital Open de España	Spain	€1,200,000	(Sweden) Robert Karlsson (4)	24		
29 Apr	Algarve Open de Portugal	Portugal	€1,000,000	(Wales) Phillip Price (2)	24		
6 May	Novotel Perrier Open de France	France	€1,300,000	(Spain) José María Olazábal (21)	24		
13 May	Benson & Hedges International Open	England	£1,000,000	(Sweden) Henrik Stenson (1)	48		
20 May	Deutsche Bank - SAP Open TPC of Europe	Germany	€2,700,000	(United States) Tiger Woods (n/a)	54		
28 May	Volvo PGA Championship	England	€3,200,000	(Scotland) Andrew Oldcorn (3)	64		Flagship event
3 Jun	Victor Chandler British Masters	England	£1,200,000	(France) Thomas Levet (2)	32		
10 Jun	Compass Group English Open	England	£800,000	(Australia) Peter O'Malley (3)	28		
17 Jun	U.S. Open	United States	US$5,000,000	(South Africa) Retief Goosen (5)	100		Major championship
24 Jun	Great North Open	England	£800,000	(Scotland) Andrew Coltart (2)	24		
1 Jul	Murphy's Irish Open	Ireland	€1,600,000	(Scotland) Colin Montgomerie (25)	30		
8 Jul	Smurfit European Open	Ireland	£2,000,000	(Northern Ireland) Darren Clarke (8)	46		
15 Jul	Scottish Open	Scotland	£2,200,000	(South Africa) Retief Goosen (6)	50		
22 Jul	The Open Championship	England	£3,300,000	(United States) David Duval (n/a)	100		Major championship
29 Jul	TNT Dutch Open	Netherlands	€1,800,000	(Germany) Bernhard Langer (40)	34		
5 Aug	Volvo Scandinavian Masters	Sweden	€1,800,000	(Scotland) Colin Montgomerie (26)	40		
12 Aug	Celtic Manor Resort Wales Open	Wales	£750,000	(Republic of Ireland) Paul McGinley (3)	24		
19 Aug	North West of Ireland Open	Ireland	€350,000	(Germany) Tobias Dier (1)	16	CHA	
19 Aug	PGA Championship	United States	US$5,200,000	(United States) David Toms (n/a)	100		Major championship
26 Aug	Gleneagles Scottish PGA Championship	Scotland	£1,000,000	(England) Paul Casey (1)	24		
26 Aug	WGC-NEC Invitational	United States	US$5,000,000	(United States) Tiger Woods (n/a)	68		World Golf Championship
2 Sep	BMW International Open	Germany	€1,800,000	(United States) John Daly (3)	42		
9 Sep	Omega European Masters	Switzerland	€1,500,000	(Argentina) Ricardo González (1)	24		
~~16 Sep~~	WGC-American Express Championship	United States	–	Cancelled	–		World Golf Championship
23 Sep	Trophée Lancôme	France	€1,400,000	(Spain) Sergio García (3)	28		
7 Oct	Linde German Masters	Germany	€2,700,000	(Germany) Bernhard Langer (41)	44		
~~14 Oct~~	Estoril Open	Portugal	–	Cancelled	–		
14 Oct	Cannes Open	France	€550,000	(Argentina) Jorge Berendt (1)	24		
21 Oct	Dunhill Links Championship	Scotland	US$5,000,000	(Scotland) Paul Lawrie (4)	48		New tournament Pro-Am
28 Oct	Telefónica Open de Madrid	Spain	€1,400,000	(South Africa) Retief Goosen (7)	30		
4 Nov	Atlanet Italian Open	Italy	€1,000,000	(France) Grégory Havret (1)	24		
11 Nov	Volvo Masters Andalucía	Spain	US$3,000,000	(Republic of Ireland) Pádraig Harrington (4)	46		Tour Championship

=== Unofficial events ===
The following events were sanctioned by the European Tour, but did not carry official money, nor were wins official.

Date	Tournament	Host country	Purse	Winner(s)	OWGR points	Notes
~~30 Sep~~	Ryder Cup	England	n/a	Postponed	n/a	Team event
14 Oct	Cisco World Match Play Championship	England	£1,000,000	(Wales) Ian Woosnam	n/a	Limited-field event
18 Nov	WGC-World Cup	Japan	US$3,000,000	(South Africa) Ernie Els and (South Africa) Retief Goosen	n/a	World Golf Championship; Team event

== Order of Merit ==
The Order of Merit was titled as the Volvo Order of Merit and was based on prize money won during the season, calculated in Euros.

Position	Player	Prize money (€)
1	(South Africa) Retief Goosen	2,862,806
2	(Republic of Ireland) Pádraig Harrington	2,090,166
3	(Northern Ireland) Darren Clarke	1,988,055
4	(South Africa) Ernie Els	1,716,287
5	(Scotland) Colin Montgomerie	1,578,676
6	(New Zealand) Michael Campbell	1,577,130
7	(Denmark) Thomas Bjørn	1,474,802
8	(Republic of Ireland) Paul McGinley	1,464,434
9	(Scotland) Paul Lawrie	1,428,831
10	(Sweden) Niclas Fasth	1,224,588

== Awards ==
Award	Winner	Ref.
Golfer of the Year	(South Africa) Retief Goosen	
Sir Henry Cotton Rookie of the Year	(England) Paul Casey	

== See also ==
- 2001 European Seniors Tour
