= 2000 European Tour =

Golf tour season

2000 European Tour season
- Duration: 11 November 1999 – 12 November 2000
- Number of official events: 44
- Most wins: (England) Lee Westwood (5)
- Order of Merit: (England) Lee Westwood
- Golfer of the Year: (England) Lee Westwood
- Sir Henry Cotton Rookie of the Year: (England) Ian Poulter

The 2000 European Tour, titled as the 2000 PGA European Tour, was the 29th season of the European Tour, the main professional golf tour in Europe since its inaugural season in 1972.

== Changes for 2000 ==
There were several changes from the previous season, with the Alfred Dunhill Championship replacing the South African PGA Championship due to sponsorship reasons, the addition of two tournaments celebrating the 500th anniversary of the discovery of Brazil by Pedro Álvares Cabral in 1500, the Greg Norman Holden International, the Celtic Manor Resort Wales Open and The Eurobet Seve Ballesteros Trophy, and the loss of the Estoril Open, the German Open and the Sarazen World Open. Money earned from the Masters Tournament counted towards the Order of Merit for the first time.

== Schedule ==
The following table lists official events during the 2000 season.

Date	Tournament	Host country	Purse	Winner (Note: The number in brackets after each winner's name is the number of European Tour events they had won up to and including that tournament. This information is only shown for European Tour members and are inclusive of the three United States-based major championships which were included on the schedule for the first time in 1998, with earlier editions having retrospectively been recognised as official tour wins.)	OWGR points	Other tours (Note: AFR − Southern Africa Tour; ANZ − PGA Tour of Australasia; ASA − Asian PGA Tour; CHA − Challenge Tour.)	Notes
14 Nov	Johnnie Walker Classic	Taiwan	£800,000	(New Zealand) Michael Campbell (1)	28	ANZ, ASA	
16 Jan	Alfred Dunhill Championship	South Africa	£500,000	(England) Anthony Wall (1)	12	AFR	New tournament
23 Jan	Mercedes-Benz South African Open	South Africa	US$1,000,000	(Sweden) Mathias Grönberg (3)	32	AFR (Note: Southern Africa Tour flagship event)	
30 Jan	Heineken Classic	Australia	A$1,600,000	(New Zealand) Michael Campbell (2)	36	ANZ	
6 Feb	Greg Norman Holden International	Australia	A$2,000,000	(Australia) Lucas Parsons (1)	34	ANZ	New to European Tour
13 Feb	Benson & Hedges Malaysian Open	Malaysia	US$825,000	(Taiwan) Yeh Wei-tze (1)	12	ASA	
20 Feb	Algarve Portuguese Open	Portugal	€1,000,000	(Scotland) Gary Orr (1)	24		
27 Feb	WGC-Andersen Consulting Match Play Championship	United States	US$5,000,000	(Northern Ireland) Darren Clarke (6)	76		World Golf Championship
5 Mar	Dubai Desert Classic	UAE	US$1,300,000	(Argentina) José Cóceres (2)	42		
12 Mar	Qatar Masters	Qatar	US$750,000	(Netherlands) Rolf Muntz (1)	24		
19 Mar	Madeira Island Open	Portugal	€550,000	(Sweden) Niclas Fasth (1)	24		
26 Mar	Brazil Rio de Janeiro 500 Years Open	Brazil	€675,000	(England) Roger Chapman (1)	24		New tournament
2 Apr	Brazil São Paulo 500 Years Open	Brazil	€750,000	(Republic of Ireland) Pádraig Harrington (2)	24		New tournament
9 Apr	Masters Tournament	United States	US$4,600,000	(Fiji) Vijay Singh (9)	100		Major championship
23 Apr	Moroccan Open Méditel	Morocco	€650,000	(England) Jamie Spence (2)	24		
1 May	Peugeot Open de España	Spain	€1,000,000	(England) Brian Davis (1)	30		
7 May	Novotel Perrier Open de France	France	€1,200,000	(Scotland) Colin Montgomerie (23)	24		
14 May	Benson & Hedges International Open	England	£1,000,000	(Spain) José María Olazábal (20)	44		
21 May	Deutsche Bank - SAP Open TPC of Europe	Germany	€2,700,000	(England) Lee Westwood (10)	52		
29 May	Volvo PGA Championship	England	€2,500,000	(Scotland) Colin Montgomerie (24)	64		Flagship event
4 Jun	Compass Group English Open	England	£800,000	(Northern Ireland) Darren Clarke (7)	30		
11 Jun	Celtic Manor Resort Wales Open	Wales	£750,000	(Denmark) Steen Tinning (1)	24		New tournament
18 Jun	U.S. Open	United States	US$4,500,000	(United States) Tiger Woods (n/a)	100		Major championship
25 Jun	Compaq European Grand Prix	England	€1,000,000	(England) Lee Westwood (11)	24		
2 Jul	Murphy's Irish Open	Ireland	€1,600,000	(Sweden) Patrik Sjöland (2)	34		
9 Jul	Smurfit European Open	Ireland	£1,500,000	(England) Lee Westwood (12)	44		
15 Jul	Standard Life Loch Lomond	Scotland	£1,100,000	(South Africa) Ernie Els (8)	52		
23 Jul	The Open Championship	Scotland	£2,800,000	(United States) Tiger Woods (n/a)	100		Major championship
30 Jul	TNT Dutch Open	Netherlands	€1,300,000	(Australia) Stephen Leaney (3)	26		
6 Aug	Volvo Scandinavian Masters	Sweden	€1,600,000	(England) Lee Westwood (13)	34		
13 Aug	Victor Chandler British Masters	England	£800,000	(Scotland) Gary Orr (2)	30		
20 Aug	Buzzgolf.com North West of Ireland Open	Ireland	€350,000	(Italy) Massimo Scarpa (1)	24	CHA	
20 Aug	PGA Championship	United States	US$5,000,000	(United States) Tiger Woods (n/a)	100		Major championship
27 Aug	Scottish PGA Championship	Scotland	£400,000	(Sweden) Pierre Fulke (2)	24		
27 Aug	WGC-NEC Invitational	United States	US$5,000,000	(United States) Tiger Woods (n/a)	64		World Golf Championship
3 Sep	BMW International Open	Germany	€1,500,000	(Denmark) Thomas Bjørn (5)	32		
10 Sep	Canon European Masters	Switzerland	€1,500,000	(Argentina) Eduardo Romero (7)	34		
17 Sep	Trophée Lancôme	France	€1,300,000	(South Africa) Retief Goosen (4)	46		
24 Sep	Belgacom Open	Belgium	€1,000,000	(England) Lee Westwood (14)	38		
1 Oct	Linde German Masters	Germany	€2,700,000	(New Zealand) Michael Campbell (3)	50		
22 Oct	BBVA Open Turespaña Masters Comunidad de Madrid	Spain	€1,000,000	(Republic of Ireland) Pádraig Harrington (3)	32		
29 Oct	Italian Open	Italy	€1,000,000	(England) Ian Poulter (1)	24		
5 Nov	Volvo Masters	Spain	US$3,000,000	(Sweden) Pierre Fulke (3)	48		Tour Championship
12 Nov	WGC-American Express Championship	Spain	US$5,000,000	(Canada) Mike Weir (n/a)	66		World Golf Championship

=== Unofficial events ===
The following events were sanctioned by the European Tour, but did not carry official money, nor were wins official.

Date	Tournament	Host country	Purse	Winner(s)	OWGR points	Notes
16 Apr	Eurobet Seve Ballesteros Trophy	Portugal	€2,400,000	Team Continental Europe	n/a	New tournament Team event
11 Jul	J. P. McManus Pro-Am	Ireland	n/a	(United States) Tiger Woods	n/a	Pro-Am
9 Oct	Cisco World Match Play Championship	England	£1,000,000	(England) Lee Westwood	n/a	Limited-field event
15 Oct	Alfred Dunhill Cup	Scotland	£1,000,000	Team Spain	n/a	Team event
10 Dec	WGC-World Cup	Argentina	US$3,000,000	(United States) David Duval and (United States) Tiger Woods	n/a	World Golf Championship; Team event

== Order of Merit ==
The Order of Merit was titled as the Volvo Order of Merit and was based on prize money won during the season, calculated in Euros.

Position	Player	Prize money (€)
1	(England) Lee Westwood	3,125,147
2	(Northern Ireland) Darren Clarke	2,717,965
3	(South Africa) Ernie Els	2,017,248
4	(New Zealand) Michael Campbell	1,993,550
5	(Denmark) Thomas Bjørn	1,929,657
6	(Scotland) Colin Montgomerie	1,740,917
7	(Republic of Ireland) Pádraig Harrington	1,350,921
8	(Wales) Phillip Price	1,331,591
9	(Spain) José María Olazábal	1,174,564
10	(Scotland) Gary Orr	1,009,473

== Awards ==
Award	Winner	Ref.
Golfer of the Year	(England) Lee Westwood	
Sir Henry Cotton Rookie of the Year	(England) Ian Poulter	

== See also ==
- 2000 European Seniors Tour
