= 2000 Seve Trophy =

Coordinates: 51.388°N 0.631°W

- Dates: 14–16 April
- Venue: The Old Course, Sunningdale Golf Club
- Location: Berkshire, England
- Captains: Colin Montgomerie (GB&I); Seve Ballesteros (Europe)
(United Kingdom) (Republic of Ireland)	12½	13½	(Europe)
- Continental Europe wins the Seve Trophy

The 2000 Seve Trophy took place 14–16 April on The Old Course at Sunningdale Golf Club in Berkshire, England. The team captain for Great Britain and Ireland was Colin Montgomerie, with the captain for Continental Europe being Seve Ballesteros. The inaugural competition was won by Continental Europe. The event was officially called "The Eurobet Seve Ballesteros Trophy".

== Format ==
The teams competed over three days with four fourball matches on both Friday and Saturday, four foursomes matches on Saturday afternoon, four greensomes matches on Sunday morning and ten singles on Sunday.

Each member of the winner team received €150,000, the losing team €90,000 each, giving a total prize fund of €2,400,000.

== Teams ==
Mark James, who qualified by finishing 18th on the 1999 European Tour Order of Merit, turned down the chance to play for Team Great Britain and Ireland and was replaced by David Howell.

Team GB&I
Name	Country	Qualification
Colin Montgomerie	Scotland	Playing captain
Lee Westwood	England	1999 European Tour Order of Merit: 2nd
Paul Lawrie	Scotland	1999 European Tour Order of Merit: 6th
Pádraig Harrington	Ireland	1999 European Tour Order of Merit: 7th
Darren Clarke	Northern Ireland	1999 European Tour Order of Merit: 8th
John Bickerton	England	1999 European Tour Order of Merit: 20th
Gary Orr	Scotland	1999 European Tour Order of Merit: 21st
David Howell	England	1999 European Tour Order of Merit: 22nd
Phillip Price	Wales	Leading player on the 2000 European Tour Order of Merit on 9 April
Ian Woosnam	Wales	Captain's pick

Team Continental Europe
Name	Country	Qualification
Seve Ballesteros	Spain	Playing captain
Sergio García	Spain	1999 European Tour Order of Merit: 3rd
Miguel Ángel Jiménez	Spain	1999 European Tour Order of Merit: 4th
Jarmo Sandelin	Sweden	1999 European Tour Order of Merit: 9th
Jean van de Velde	France	1999 European Tour Order of Merit: 13th
Thomas Bjørn	Denmark	1999 European Tour Order of Merit: 14th
Bernhard Langer	Germany	1999 European Tour Order of Merit: 15th
Alex Čejka	Germany	1999 European Tour Order of Merit: 17th
Robert Karlsson	Sweden	Leading player on the 2000 European Tour Order of Merit on 9 April
José María Olazábal	Spain	Captain's pick

== Day one ==
Friday, 14 April 2000

=== Morning foursomes ===
	Results
Montgomerie/Woosnam	(United Kingdom) (Republic of Ireland) 2 & 1	Olazábal/Jiménez
Clarke/Westwood	(United Kingdom) (Republic of Ireland) 4 & 3	Čejka/Langer
Harrington/Price	(United Kingdom) (Republic of Ireland) 1 up	Bjørn/Karlsson
Lawrie/Orr	(Europe) 3 & 2	García/van de Velde
3	Session	1
3	Overall	1

=== Afternoon fourball ===
	Results
Westwood/Howell	(United Kingdom) (Republic of Ireland) 2 & 1	Olazábal/Ballesteros
Clarke/Bickerton	(Europe) 1 up	Bjørn/Jiménez
Woosnam/Harrington	(Europe) 2 & 1	Čejka/Langer
Lawrie/Montgomerie	(Europe) 3 & 2	Sandelin/García
1	Session	3
4	Overall	4

== Day two ==
Saturday, 15 April 2000

=== Morning fourball ===
	Results
Woosnam/Montgomerie	(Europe) 6 & 5	Jiménez/Olazábal
Lawrie/Orr	(United Kingdom) (Republic of Ireland) 1 up	Sandelin/Karlsson
Bickerton/Price	(Europe) 1 up	Bjørn/García
Clarke/Westwood	(United Kingdom) (Republic of Ireland) 3 & 1	Čejka/van de Velde
2	Session	2
6	Overall	6

== Day three ==
Sunday, 16 April 2000

=== Morning greensomes ===
The greensomes were due to be played on Saturday afternoon but were delayed by rain and played on Sunday morning before the singles matches.

	Results
Lawrie/Orr	halved	Jiménez/Olazábal
Montgomerie/Howell	(United Kingdom) (Republic of Ireland) 2 & 1	García/van de Velde
Clarke/Westwood	(Europe) 4 & 3	Langer/Bjørn
Harrington/Price	halved	Čejka/Karlsson
2	Session	2
8	Overall	8

=== Singles ===
	Results
Colin Montgomerie	(Europe) 2 & 1	Seve Ballesteros
Darren Clarke	halved	Sergio García
John Bickerton	(Europe) 2 & 1	Jarmo Sandelin
Lee Westwood	(United Kingdom) (Republic of Ireland) 1 up	Thomas Bjørn
Phillip Price	(United Kingdom) (Republic of Ireland) 2 & 1	Alex Čejka
Ian Woosnam	(Europe) 4 & 3	Bernhard Langer
David Howell	(Europe) 2 & 1	Robert Karlsson
Gary Orr	(Europe) 2 & 1	José María Olazábal
Paul Lawrie	(United Kingdom) (Republic of Ireland) 5 & 4	Jean van de Velde
Pádraig Harrington	(United Kingdom) (Republic of Ireland) 1 up	Miguel Ángel Jiménez
4½	Session	5½
12½	Overall	13½
