= Estoril Open =

Estoril Open may refer to:

- Portugal Open, a tennis tournament held in Oeiras, Portugal, from 1990 to 2014
- Estoril Open (tennis), a new tennis tournament held in Cascais, Portugal, which replaced the Portugal Open in 2015
- Estoril Open (golf), a golf tournament held in 1999
