= North West of Ireland Open =

Golf competition in Ireland, 1999–2002

Tournament information
- Location: Ballyliffin, County Donegal, Ireland
- Established: 1999
- Course: Ballyliffin Golf Club
- Par: 72
- Length: 7,220 yd (6,600 m)
- Tours: European Tour; Challenge Tour
- Format: Stroke play
- Prize fund: €350,000
- Month played: August
- Final year: 2002

Tournament record score
- Aggregate: 271 Tobias Dier
- To par: −17 as above

Final champion
- (Sweden) Adam Mednick
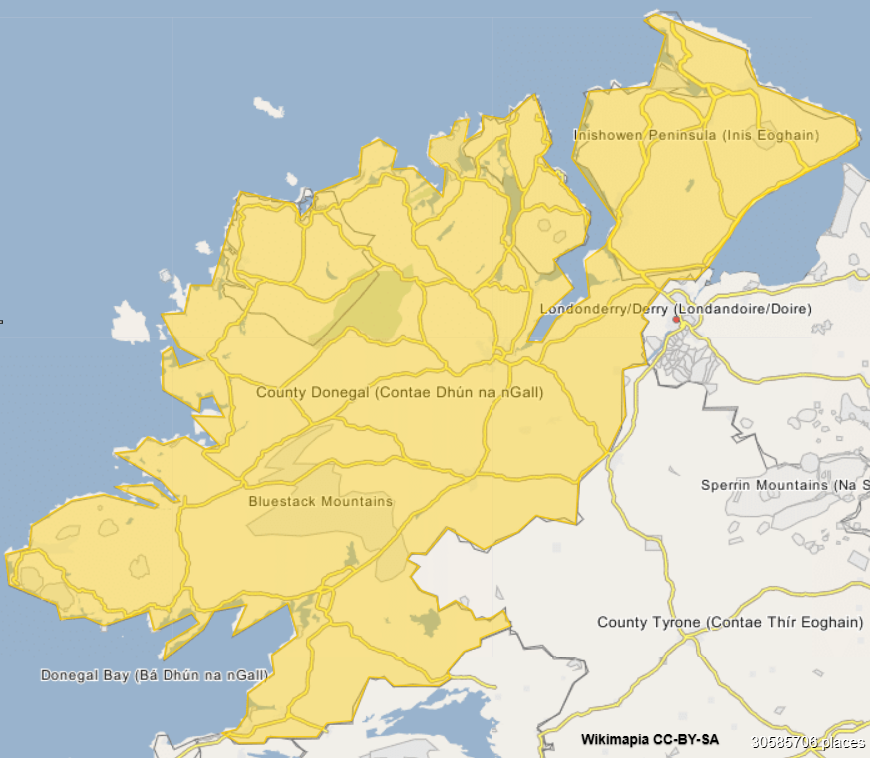
- Location in the Ireland Location in County Donegal

The North West of Ireland Open was a golf tournament which was played annually from 1999 to 2002. It was a "double-badge" tournament that featured on the schedules of both the European Tour and the Challenge Tour. In 2002 it was played at the Ballyliffin Golf Club in County Donegal, Ireland with a prize fund of €358,517.

== Tournament hosts ==
- 2002: Ballyliffin Golf Club
- 2000–01: Slieve Russell Hotel Golf & Country Club
- 1999: Galway Bay Golf & Country Club

== Winners ==
Year	Tours (Note: CHA − Challenge Tour; EUR − European Tour.)	Winner	Score	To par	Margin of victory	Runner(s)-up
North West of Ireland Open
2002	CHA, EUR	(Sweden) Adam Mednick	281	−7	5 strokes	(Scotland) Andrew Coltart (Italy) Costantino Rocca
2001	CHA, EUR	(Germany) Tobias Dier	271	−17	1 stroke	(Wales) Stephen Dodd
Buzzgolf.com North West of Ireland Open
2000	CHA, EUR	(Italy) Massimo Scarpa	275	−13	1 stroke	(Sweden) Mikael Lundberg
West of Ireland Golf Classic
1999	CHA, EUR	(Italy) Costantino Rocca	276	−12	2 strokes	(Republic of Ireland) Pádraig Harrington
