= Pádraig Harrington =

Irish professional golfer (born 1971)

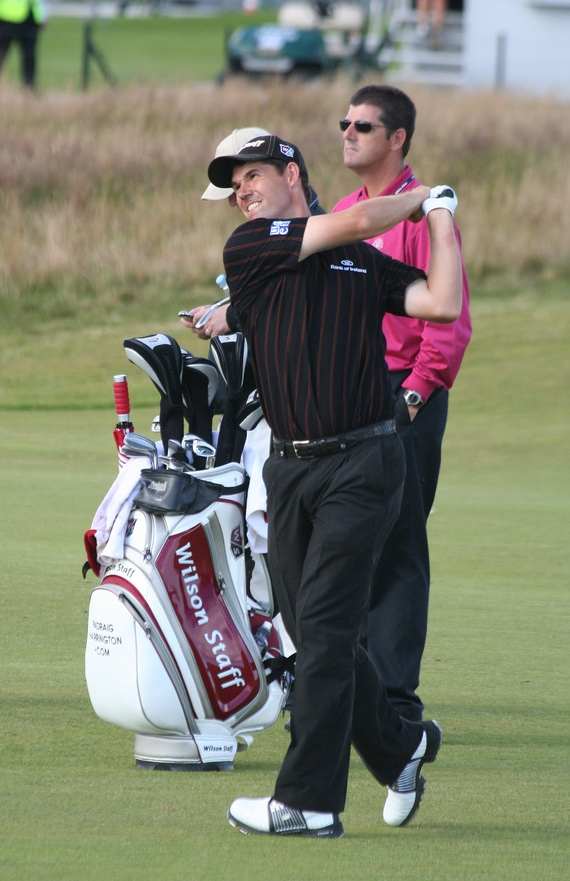
- Harrington at the 2007 Open Championship

Personal information
- Full name: Pádraig Peter Harrington
- Nationality: Ireland
- Born: 31 August 1971 (age 55) Dublin, County Dublin, Ireland
- Height: 1.86 m (6 ft 1 in)
- Weight: 83 kg (183 lb)
- Spouse: Caroline (m. 1997)
- Children: 2

Career
- Sport: Golf
- Turned professional: 1995
- Current tours: PGA Tour; European Tour; PGA Tour Champions
- Professional wins: 44
- Highest ranking: 3 (20 July 2008)

Number of wins by tour
- PGA Tour: 6
- European Tour: 15
- Japan Golf Tour: 1
- Asian Tour: 4
- PGA Tour Champions: 12
- European Senior Tour: 4
- Other: 11

Best results in major championships (wins: 3)
- Masters Tournament: T5: 2002, 2008
- PGA Championship: Won: 2008
- U.S. Open: T4: 2012
- The Open Championship: Won: 2007, 2008

Achievements and awards
- World Golf Hall of Fame: 2024 (member page)
- European Tour Order of Merit winner: 2006
- European Tour Golfer of the Year: 2007, 2008
- European Tour Players' Player of the Year: 2008
- PGA Tour Player of the Year: 2008
- PGA Player of the Year: 2008
- PGA Tour Champions Rookie of the Year: 2022
- (For a full list of awards, see here)

Pádraig Peter Harrington (born 31 August 1971) is an Irish professional golfer who plays on the European Tour, PGA Tour and the PGA Tour Champions. He has won three major championships: The Open Championship in 2007 and 2008 and the PGA Championship, also in 2008. He spent over 300 weeks in the top-10 of the world rankings, and reached a career-high ranking of the third spot in July 2008. Harrington was a member of six consecutive Ryder Cup teams between 1999 and 2010. In 2024, he was inducted into the World Golf Hall of Fame.

== Early life and amateur career ==
Harrington was born in Dublin, Ireland, the youngest of five sons of Patrick and Breda Harrington. His father, "Paddy" (1933–2005), a Garda who played Gaelic football for Cork in the 1950s, was also a boxer and hurler, and played to a five handicap in golf.

He grew up in Rathfarnham, an area on Dublin's southside and the birthplace of two other professional golfers, Paul McGinley and Peter Lawrie. Harrington attended the same local secondary school as McGinley (though not in the same year), giving their school, Coláiste Éanna, the unique distinction of having produced two Ryder Cup captains. Encouraged by his brothers and father, Harrington's interest and passion for golf grew as he developed his game at nearby Stackstown G.C.

He studied accountancy at university for a number of years while playing high-standard amateur golf. As an amateur, Harrington appeared in the Walker Cup three times. In his final appearance, in 1995, his team won the Walker Cup for the Great Britain & Ireland team. He was unsure whether to turn professional, however, initially doubting his skills.

== Professional career ==
=== European Tour ===
In September of 1995, Harrington turned professional. He turned professional at the relatively late age of 24. He played in his first European Tour event later that month finishing tied 88th in the European Open.

In 1996, he joined the European Tour. His first victory came quickly, at the 1996 Peugeot Spanish Open, his 10th start on the European Tour. But for the next few years, the most remarkable thing about his career was the number of times he finished runner-up in European Tour events, including four second-places in five events in late 1999. With these runners up finishes Harrington qualified to make his Ryder Cup debut in 1999. During this period, Harrington also won the 1998 Irish PGA Championship.

However, in 2000 Harrington discovered a winning touch with two European Tour wins at the Brazil São Paulo 500 Years Open in April, and the BBVA Open Turespaña Masters Comunidad de Madrid in October. With these wins Harrington finished 7th on the European Tour Order of Merit for the second time equaling his 1999 finish. In 2001, Harrington won his fourth tournament on the European Tour at the Volvo Masters Andalucia, this win and 6 runners up finishes in 2001 lifted Harrington to a then career-high year-end finish of second on the European Tour's Order of Merit.

2002 was another successful year on the European Tour with particular success towards the end of the season including winning at the Dunhill Links Championship in October, having birdied the final hole to get into a playoff with Eduardo Romero. This win and a further 9 top ten finishes earned Harrington a second-place finish on the European Tour's Order of Merit for the second consecutive season. This form earned Harrington a second Ryder Cup appearance at the 2002 Ryder Cup hosted at The Belfry, in the final day singles Harrington, playing in match 5, won an important point against Mark Calcavecchia helping Europe to victory and regain the cup by a score of 15.5 to 12.5.

Harrington continued this winning form into 2003 winning the first event of the 2003 season at the BMW Asian Open in November 2002. Following Harrington's success in 2001 and 2002 he was invited to, and won, the 2002 Target World Challenge, an unofficial event in the USA hosted by Tiger Woods, whilst this is not a PGA Tour event it marked Harrington's first win in the United States. His winning form continued into the new year winning the Deutsche Bank Players Championship of Europe in May 2003. With these two wins Harrington finished third on the 2003 European Tour Order of Merit.

Harrington won a further two events on the European tour in 2004 at the Omega Hong Kong Open in December 2003 and the Linde German Masters in September 2004. Harrington finished the season 3rd on the European Tour's Order of Merit, this was the 4th consecutive year in which he was within the year end top-5 and the 6th consecutive year in the top-10. Harrington once again qualified for the 2004 Ryder Cup, hosted at Oakland Hills Country Club where he was part of a European team that defeated the United States by the largest winning margin by a European team in the history of the event.

=== PGA Tour ===
In 2005 having joined the PGA Tour (see below), Harrington played fewer events on the European Tour and experienced his first winless year on the tour since 1999. In 2006 Harrington was once again a winner on the European Tour at the 2006 Alfred Dunhill Links Championship, this was his second links golf win having also won the event in 2002 and was a prelude for his future Open Championship success. Following this Harrington won the 2006 European Tour Order of Merit, coming after a titanic battle with Paul Casey and David Howell, which was won on the last hole of the last event. Sergio García bogeyed the 72nd hole in the season-ending Volvo Masters to give Harrington a share of second place which earned him enough money to leapfrog Paul Casey to 1st place on the Order of Merit.

In 2007 Harrington won the Irish Open for the first time, in doing so Harrington became the first home winner of the Irish Open for 25 years.

In both 2003 and 2004 he was the runner-up in The Players Championship, and in the latter year, he won enough money on the PGA Tour as a non-member to earn an invitation to the end of season Tour Championship.

He took membership of the PGA Tour in 2005 and in March he won his first PGA Tour official money event at the Honda Classic, where he beat Vijay Singh and Joe Ogilvie in a sudden-death playoff. In late June, Harrington snatched the Barclays Classic from Jim Furyk with a spectacular 65-foot (20 m) eagle putt on the final hole for his second PGA Tour win. Two weeks later his father died from oesophageal cancer on 11 July, the Monday night preceding the 2005 Open Championship, forcing Harrington's withdrawal.

Harrington spent over 300 weeks in the world top ten between 2001 and 2010. and achieved his best ranking of third following his second Open Championship victory. He has also played for Europe in six Ryder Cups; losing in 1999 and 2008, but winning in 2002, 2004, 2006 and 2010. He has also won the par-3 contest at Augusta National, held the day before The Masters, in 2003 (tie), 2004 and 2012 (tie).

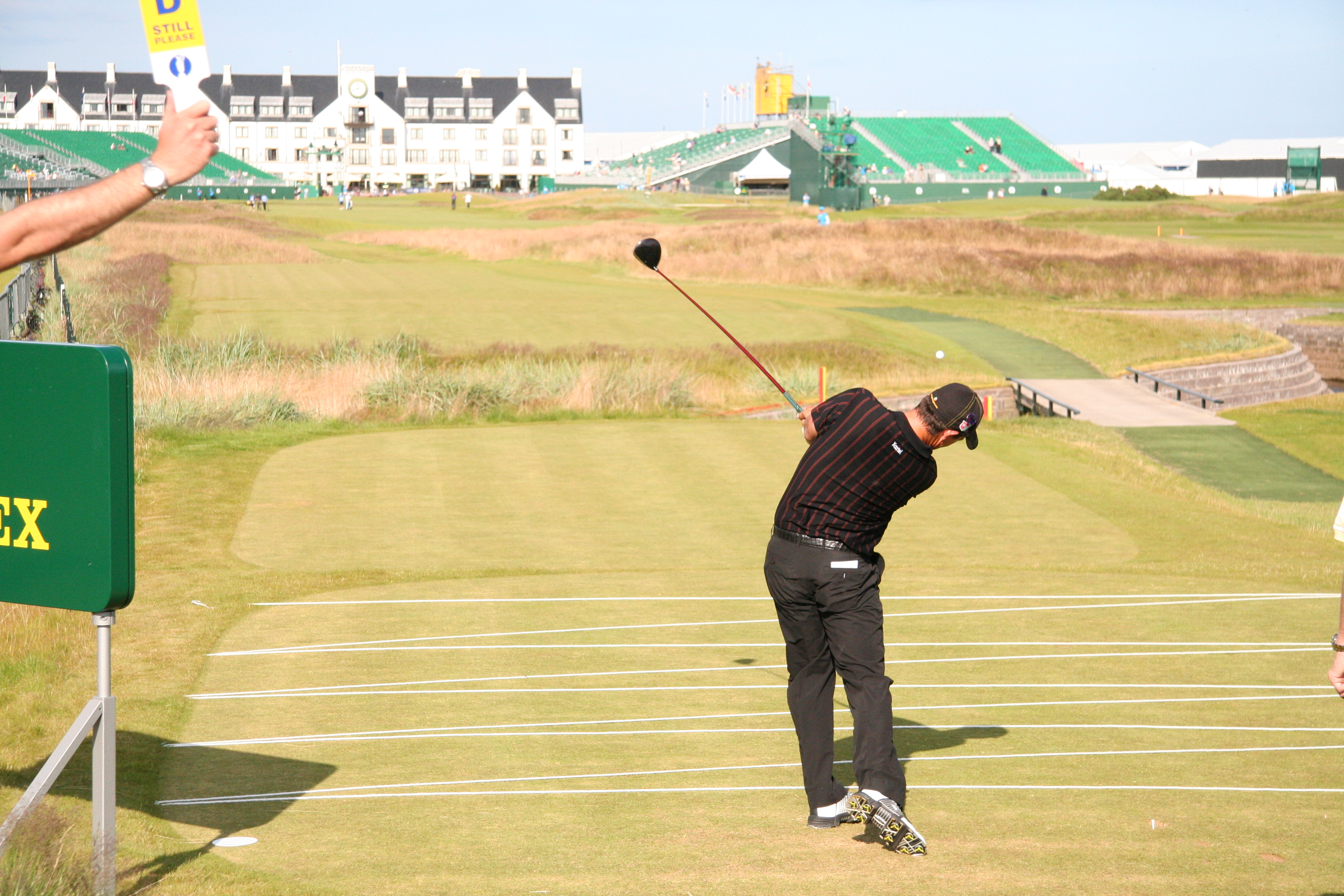
Harrington teeing off at the 2007 Open Championship.

At the 2007 Open Championship, Harrington defeated Sergio García in a four-hole playoff at Carnoustie Golf Links, becoming the first Irishman to win The Open Championship in 60 years, and the first ever from the Republic of Ireland. Both players went into the playoff having shot a 7-under 277 for the championship. Harrington subsequently won by one stroke in the playoff.

A year later at the 2008 Open Championship, it was unclear if he would get a chance to defend his Open title at Royal Birkdale as eight days prior to the event he injured his wrist. But Harrington successfully defended his title, overcoming a 2-shot deficit to Greg Norman with a final round 69. He shot a four-under-par 32 on the back nine, which enabled him to pull away from Norman and Ian Poulter. His eagle on the par-5 17th all but sealed the tournament. He is the first European golfer since James Braid in 1906 to retain the Claret Jug. The win moved him from fourteenth to third in the world rankings, behind only Tiger Woods and Phil Mickelson.

Just three weeks after winning the Open Championship, Harrington won the PGA Championship over the South Course of the Oakland Hills Country Club, for his third major. Although at five over par after two rounds, he shot eight under par for the weekend, carding successive scores of 66 in the third and fourth rounds. His three under par 277 was two shots ahead of Sergio García and Ben Curtis. Harrington became the first European to win the PGA Championship in 78 years (Tommy Armour in 1930), and was the first winner from Ireland. Harrington's victory in the PGA Championship secured his position as the number one player in Europe, earning him a spot in the 2008 European Ryder Cup team under captain Nick Faldo.

Harrington started his 2009 season with a tied-fifth finish in the Abu Dhabi Golf Championship on the European Tour. He then went through a tough period in his career, missing the cut at the AT&T Pebble Beach National Pro-Am, as well as the Northern Trust Open on the PGA Tour. He finished tied-11th at the Arnold Palmer Invitational in what would be one of his better results in the early part of 2009. He arrived at the 2009 Masters Tournament hoping to join Ben Hogan and Tiger Woods as the only players to win three consecutive professional majors. Harrington started with a 3-under-par first round, but eventually faded over the weekend, finishing tied for 35th place. His struggles continued in the succeeding months, as he missed the cut at five of his next six events, including The 3 Irish Open and the U.S. Open. It was during this period that he announced that he was working on swing changes with coach Bob Torrance.

Harrington arrived at The Open Championship at Turnberry hoping to complete a hat-trick of Open wins, a feat that has only been achieved since the 1880s by Peter Thomson. Harrington finished tied for 65th place. At the WGC-Bridgestone Invitational he was involved in a final day head-to-head between himself and World number one Tiger Woods. Harrington led by one shot playing the 16th hole, but he racked up a triple-bogey to Woods' birdie and he finished in joint 2nd place. The following week Harrington, the defending champion, played the first two rounds with Woods at the PGA Championship. He shot a first-round 68, ending one shot behind the leader Woods. Rounds of 73 and 69 left him two shots behind Woods. He was in contention in the final round, until he made an 8 at the par-3 8th hole. He ended in a tie for 10th. He finished in the top 10 in all four FedEx Cup playoff events, before further top-10s in Europe and the States before the end of the season. He ended the year winless on the European and PGA Tours for the first time since 1999.

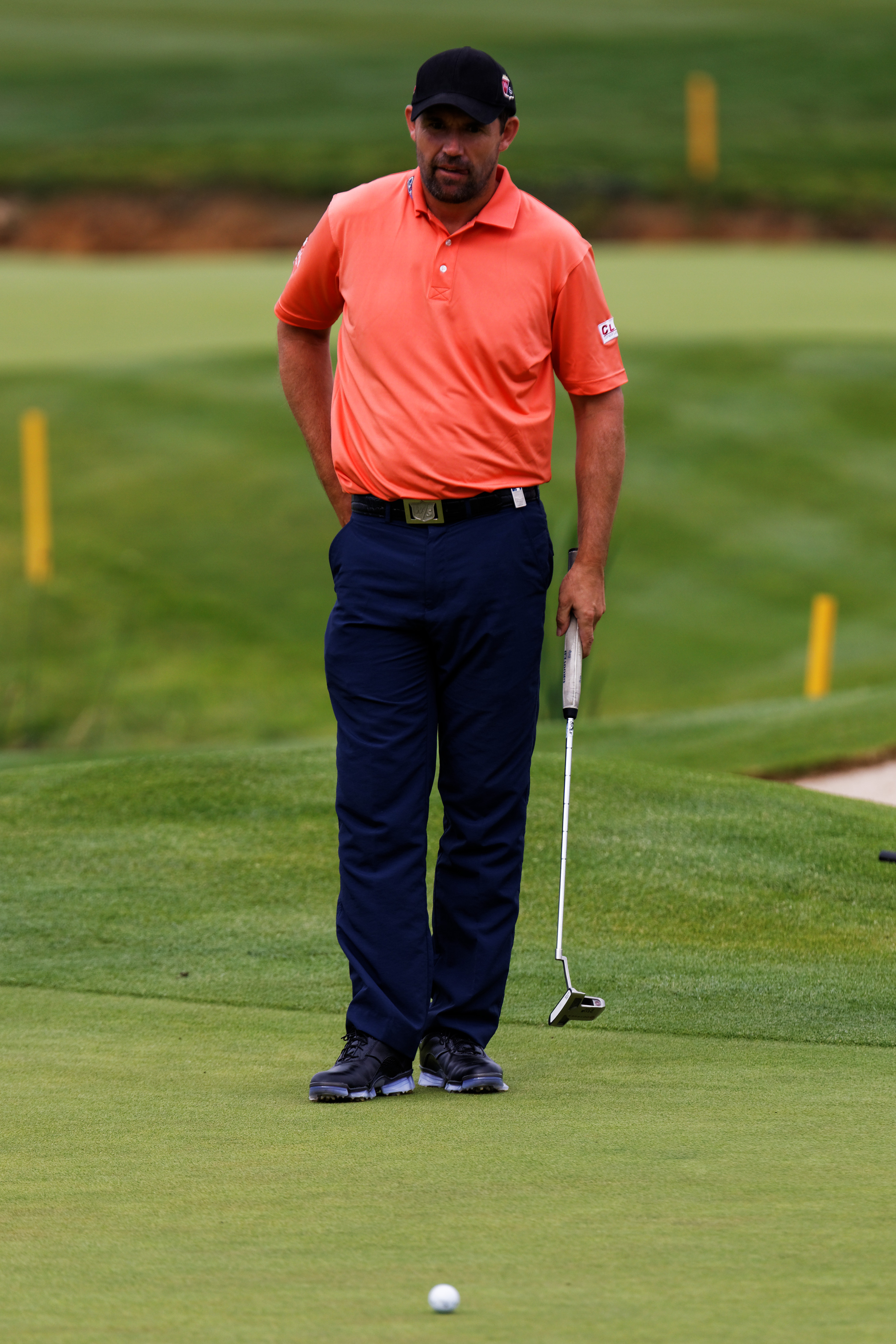
Harrington at the 2014 Open de France.

Harrington missed the cut in three out of the four majors in 2010. In an inconsistent season, he had five top-10s on the PGA Tour but also missed six cuts. He was a controversial wild-card pick by European captain Colin Montgomerie for the 2010 Ryder Cup. He won two matches and lost two matches as Europe regained the Ryder Cup. It was his sixth Ryder Cup and fourth time being on the winning team. He won his first tournament in two years at the Iskandar Johor Open in Malaysia on the Asian Tour. He finished the year ranked 25th in the world.

Harrington started his 2011 season with an opening round 65, for a first-round lead at the Abu Dhabi HSBC Golf Championship on the European Tour. He was later disqualified before his second round commenced, after a spectator telephoned in and pointed out an incident of his ball moving an exceptionally small distance closer to the hole on the green, while he was replacing his ball marker, during the first round; it had been shown on television. (The incident led to a rules review, and if it were to occur again, there would not be a penalty.) He missed the cut at the Masters Tournament and finished tied for 45th at the U.S. Open. In June 2011, he dropped outside the top 50 in the World Rankings for the first time since 1999.

Harrington made his first start of the 2012 PGA Tour season at the AT&T Pebble Beach National Pro-Am where he finished joint top of the Pro-Am leaderboard, alongside partner J.P. McManus, with Brian Harman and Greg Ontiveros. Harrington also enjoyed a good finish in the overall tournament with a tied for seventh finish. In March 2012, Harrington shot a 61 in the first round of the Transitions Championship to set a new course record at the Copperhead Course. This was also Harrington's lowest-ever round on the PGA Tour. He could not maintain his brilliant first day's play over the remaining three rounds though and finished in a tie for 20th place. In April 2012, at the first major of the year, The Masters, Harrington shot five under for the last six holes in his third round to close to within three shots of the lead. In the final round, he shot a level par round of 72 to finish tied for 8th. It was Harrington's first top-10 finish in a major since the 2009 PGA Championship.

At the 2012 U.S. Open, Harrington was in contention to win a fourth major championship, when rounds of 74-70-71 on the first three days got him into contention on Sunday. After bogeying two of the first six holes, Harrington played the stretch from hole 7–17 in 5-under-par to find himself two behind the leader. Needing a birdie at the last to finish ahead of the clubhouse leader Michael Thompson, Harrington took the pin on at the 18th and found a plugged lie in the greenside bunker, which resulted in a bogey finish at 3-over-par. Ultimately this did not cost him the championship as he finished two shots behind Webb Simpson on 1-over-par. Harrington later stated that he thought he had to birdie the last to get to 1-over-par as the reason for taking such an aggressive line on the 18th. He eventually finished in a tie for fourth place, which represented his best showing at a U.S. Open.

In October 2012 Harrington won the PGA Grand Slam of Golf despite having not won a major championship during the year, having been a late replacement for Open champion Ernie Els. Harrington endured difficult 2013 and 2014 seasons finishing outside of the top 60 on the European Tour Race to Dubai in both years and outside of the top 130 on the PGA Tour FedEx Cup in both years. During this period his Official World Golf Ranking fell to an 18-year low of 385 as of 1 December 2014. In December 2014 he won the Bank BRI Indonesia Open on the Asian Tour for his first official win for 4 years.

In March 2015, Harrington won his first title on the European or PGA Tours in seven years at the Honda Classic. He defeated rookie Daniel Berger on the second extra hole of a sudden-death playoff. Harrington had started the 2014–15 season without full playing privileges after finishing 188th in the FedEx Cup. Harrington was the second consecutive player ranked 297th in the world to win on the PGA Tour, after James Hahn won the Northern Trust Open the week before. The victory qualified Harrington for the Masters having missed out on the event in 2014 for the first time since he made his debut in 2000. This also moved him back into the world's top 100. In August 2016, Harrington represented Ireland at the 2016 Summer Olympics, finishing in a tie for the 21st place. On 23 October 2016, Harrington won the Portugal Masters by one stroke. It was his first win on the European Tour since 2008.

On 8 January 2019, Harrington was named as the captain for the 2020 Ryder Cup. The Ryder Cup was delayed one year due to the COVID-19 pandemic. The European team lost 19–9.

=== PGA Tour Champions ===
In 2022, Harrington started playing on PGA Tour Champions. He finished second to Steve Stricker in his first senior major, The Tradition. On 26 June 2022, he won his first senior major, the U.S. Senior Open, beating Stricker by one stroke.

== Awards and honors ==
- In 2006, Harrington won the European Tour's Order of Merit.
- In 2007 and 2008, he also won the European Tour Golfer of the Year award.
- In 2008, Harrington was honored with both the PGA Tour Player of the Year and the PGA Player of the Year awards.
- In 2008, he was bestowed with the European Tour Players' Player of the Year award.
- In 2022, Harrington was honored with the Champions Tour Rookie of the Year award.
- In March 2023, it was announced that he would be elected to the World Golf Hall of Fame as part of the Class of 2024.

== Personal life ==
Harrington has known his wife Caroline since childhood. They were married in 1997 and have two sons, born in 2003 and 2007.

He is a distant cousin of former NFL quarterback Joey Harrington and 1995 World Series of Poker champion and author Dan Harrington.

Harrington's given name "Pádraig" is the Irish Language version of the name Patrick, which is in common usage in Ireland.

Harrington's caddy since 2004 is Ronan Flood. Flood married Susie Gregan, the sister of Harrington's wife, in 2007.

After leaving school, Harrington mixed amateur golf with studying accounting. He passed his final exams in 1994 to gain admittance to ACCA (Association of Chartered Certified Accountants).

Harrington has undergone laser eye surgery in a bid to improve his game.

== Awards and honours ==
- International:
  - 2006:
    - European Tour Order of Merit
  - 2007:
    - European Tour Golfer of the Year
    - Association of Golf Writers Player of the Year
  - 2008:
    - PGA Player of the Year
    - PGA Tour Player of the Year
    - European Tour Golfer of the Year
    - Golf Writers Association of America (GWAA) Player of the Year
    - Association of Golf Writers Player of the Year
    - European Tour Shot of the Year – 5w on 71st Hole in Open Championship
  - 2022:
    - PGA Tour Champions Rookie of the Year
- National:
  - 1996 Texaco Ireland Sportstar Golf Award
  - 1999 Texaco Ireland Sportstar Golf Award
  - 2001 Texaco Ireland Sportstar Golf Award
  - 2002 Texaco Ireland Sportstar Golf Award, RTÉ Sports Person of the Year
  - 2004 Texaco Ireland Sportstar Golf Award (shared with Darren Clarke & Paul McGinley)
  - 2005 Texaco Ireland Sportstar Golf Award
  - 2006 Texaco Ireland Sportstar Golf Award
  - 2007 Texaco Ireland Sportstar Golf Award, RTÉ Sports Person of the Year
  - 2008 Texaco Ireland Sportstar Golf Award, Irish Golf Writers Professional of the Year Award, RTÉ Sports Person of the Year

== Amateur wins ==
- 1991 Sherry Cup
- 1994 West of Ireland Amateur Championship
- 1995 Irish Amateur Open Championship, Irish Amateur Close Championship
- Leinster Boys Championship

== Professional wins (44) ==
=== PGA Tour wins (6) ===
Legend
Major championships (3)
Other PGA Tour (3)

No.	Date	Tournament	Winning score	Margin of victory	Runner(s)-up
1	13 Mar 2005	The Honda Classic	−14 (73-69-69-63=274)	Playoff	(United States) Joe Ogilvie, (Fiji) Vijay Singh
2	26 Jun 2005	Barclays Classic	−10 (71-65-68-70=274)	1 stroke	(United States) Jim Furyk
3	22 Jul 2007	The Open Championship	−7 (69-73-68-67=277)	Playoff	(Spain) Sergio García
4	20 Jul 2008	The Open Championship (2)	+3 (74-68-72-69=283)	4 strokes	(England) Ian Poulter
5	10 Aug 2008	PGA Championship	−3 (71-74-66-66=277)	2 strokes	(Spain) Sergio García, (United States) Ben Curtis
6	2 Mar 2015	The Honda Classic (2)	−6 (67-66-71-70=274)	Playoff	(United States) Daniel Berger

PGA Tour playoff record (3–1)

No.	Year	Tournament	Opponent(s)	Result
1	2004	Buick Classic	(Spain) Sergio García, (South Africa) Rory Sabbatini	García won with birdie on third extra hole Harrington eliminated by par on second hole
2	2005	The Honda Classic	(United States) Joe Ogilvie, (Fiji) Vijay Singh	Won with par on second extra hole Ogilvie eliminated by par on first hole
3	2007	The Open Championship	(Spain) Sergio García	Won four-hole aggregate playoff; Harrington: E (3-3-4-5=15), García: +1 (5-3-4-4=16)
4	2015	The Honda Classic	(United States) Daniel Berger	Won with par on second extra hole

=== European Tour wins (15) ===
Legend
Major championships (3)
Tour Championships (1)
Other European Tour (11)

No.	Date	Tournament	Winning score	Margin of victory	Runner(s)-up
1	12 May 1996	Peugeot Spanish Open	−16 (70-64-67-71=272)	4 strokes	(Scotland) Gordon Brand Jnr
2	2 Apr 2000	Brazil São Paulo 500 Years Open	−14 (69-68-65-68=270)	2 strokes	(United States) Gerry Norquist
3	22 Oct 2000	BBVA Open Turespaña Masters Comunidad de Madrid	−21 (67-64-66-70=267)	2 strokes	(Scotland) Gary Orr
4	11 Nov 2001	Volvo Masters Andalucía	−12 (67-71-66=204) (Note: Shortened to 54 holes due to weather.)	1 stroke	(Republic of Ireland) Paul McGinley
5	6 Oct 2002	Dunhill Links Championship	−19 (66-66-68-69=269)	Playoff	(Argentina) Eduardo Romero
6	24 Nov 2002 (2003 season)	BMW Asian Open^{1}	−15 (66-70-68-69=273)	1 stroke	(India) Jyoti Randhawa
7	18 May 2003	Deutsche Bank - SAP Open TPC of Europe	−19 (65-66-70-68=269)	Playoff	(Denmark) Thomas Bjørn
8	7 Dec 2003 (2004 season)	Omega Hong Kong Open^{1}	−13 (66-75-64-70=275)	1 stroke	(South Africa) Hennie Otto
9	12 Sep 2004	Linde German Masters	−11 (67-69-67-66=269)	3 strokes	(Australia) Nick O'Hern
10	8 Oct 2006	Alfred Dunhill Links Championship (2)	−17 (66-69-68-68=271)	5 strokes	(Wales) Bradley Dredge, (United States) Edward Loar, (England) Anthony Wall
11	20 May 2007	Irish Open	−5 (73-68-71-71=283)	Playoff	(Wales) Bradley Dredge
12	22 Jul 2007	The Open Championship	−7 (69-73-68-67=277)	Playoff	(Spain) Sergio García
13	20 Jul 2008	The Open Championship (2)	+3 (74-68-72-69=283)	4 strokes	(England) Ian Poulter
14	10 Aug 2008	PGA Championship	−3 (71-74-66-66=277)	2 strokes	(Spain) Sergio García, (United States) Ben Curtis
15	23 Oct 2016	Portugal Masters	−23 (66-63-67-65=261)	1 stroke	(England) Andy Sullivan

^{1}Co-sanctioned by the Asian Tour

European Tour playoff record (4–4)

No.	Year	Tournament	Opponent(s)	Result
1	1999	Linde German Masters	(Spain) Sergio García, (Wales) Ian Woosnam	García won with birdie on second extra hole Woosnam eliminated by par on first hole
2	2000	Brazil Rio de Janeiro 500 Years Open	(England) Roger Chapman	Lost to par on second extra hole
3	2001	Carlsberg Malaysian Open	(Fiji) Vijay Singh	Lost to birdie on third extra hole
4	2002	Dunhill Links Championship	(Argentina) Eduardo Romero	Won with birdie on second extra hole
5	2003	Deutsche Bank - SAP Open TPC of Europe	(Denmark) Thomas Bjørn	Won with par on first extra hole
6	2006	BMW International Open	(South Africa) Retief Goosen, (Sweden) Henrik Stenson	Stenson won with eagle on first extra hole
7	2007	Irish Open	(Wales) Bradley Dredge	Won with par on first extra hole
8	2007	The Open Championship	(Spain) Sergio García	Won four-hole aggregate playoff; Harrington: E (3-3-4-5=15), García: +1 (5-3-4-4=16)

=== Japan Golf Tour wins (1) ===
No.	Date	Tournament	Winning score	Margin of victory	Runner-up
1	19 Nov 2006	Dunlop Phoenix Tournament	−9 (67-66-71-67=271)	Playoff	(United States) Tiger Woods

Japan Golf Tour playoff record (1–0)

No.	Year	Tournament	Opponent	Result
1	2006	Dunlop Phoenix Tournament	(United States) Tiger Woods	Won with birdie on second extra hole

=== Asian Tour wins (4) ===
No.	Date	Tournament	Winning score	Margin of victory	Runner-up
1	24 Nov 2002	BMW Asian Open^{1}	−15 (66-70-68-69=273)	1 stroke	(India) Jyoti Randhawa
2	7 Dec 2003	Omega Hong Kong Open^{1}	−13 (66-75-64-70=275)	1 stroke	(South Africa) Hennie Otto
3	17 Oct 2010	Iskandar Johor Open	−20 (64-67-68-69=268)	3 strokes	(South Korea) Noh Seung-yul
4	7 Dec 2014	Bank BRI Indonesia Open	−16 (64-66-67-71=268)	2 strokes	(Thailand) Thanyakon Khrongpha

^{1}Co-sanctioned by the European Tour

Asian Tour playoff record (0–1)

No.	Year	Tournament	Opponent	Result
1	2001	Carlsberg Malaysian Open	(Fiji) Vijay Singh	Lost to birdie on third extra hole

=== Other wins (11) ===
No.	Date	Tournament	Winning score	Margin of victory	Runner(s)-up
1	23 Nov 1997	World Cup of Golf (with (Republic of Ireland) Paul McGinley)	−31 (137-137-136-135=545)	5 strokes	Scotland – Colin Montgomerie and Raymond Russell
2	18 Oct 1998	Smurfit Irish PGA Championship	E (70-73-73=216)	Playoff	(Northern Ireland) Michael Bannon, (Republic of Ireland) Francis Howley, (Republic of Ireland) Des Smyth
3	8 Dec 2002	Target World Challenge	−20 (65-69-63-71=268)	2 strokes	(United States) Tiger Woods
4	18 Apr 2004	Irish PGA Championship (2)	−5 (70-70-76-71=287)	1 stroke	(Republic of Ireland) Philip Walton
5	5 Jul 2005	J. P. McManus Pro-Am	−14 (67-63=130)	6 strokes	(South Africa) Tim Clark
6	18 Sep 2005	Irish PGA Championship (3)	−3 (71-70-71-73=285)	Playoff	(Northern Ireland) Stephen Hamill, (Republic of Ireland) Damien McGrane
7	14 Jul 2007	Irish PGA Championship (4)	−5 (69-68-70-72=279)	Playoff	(Republic of Ireland) Brendan McGovern
8	28 Oct 2007	Hassan II Golf Trophy	−12 (67-67-72-74=280)	3 strokes	(Northern Ireland) Darren Clarke
9	12 Jul 2008	Ladbrokes.com Irish PGA Championship (5)	+1 (75-68-70-72=285)	4 strokes	(Republic of Ireland) Philip Walton
10	11 Jul 2009	Ladbrokes.com Irish PGA Championship (6)	−1 (68-70-73-72=283)	7 strokes	(Republic of Ireland) Brian McElhinney
11	24 Oct 2012	PGA Grand Slam of Golf	−9 (66-67=133)	1 stroke	(United States) Webb Simpson

Other playoff record (3–2)

No.	Year	Tournament	Opponent(s)	Result
1	1998	Smurfit Irish PGA Championship	(Northern Ireland) Michael Bannon, (Republic of Ireland) Francis Howley, (Republic of Ireland) Des Smyth	Won with birdie on first extra hole
2	2005	Irish PGA Championship	(Northern Ireland) Stephen Hamill, (Republic of Ireland) Damien McGrane	Won with par on first extra hole
3	2007	Irish PGA Championship	(Republic of Ireland) Brendan McGovern	Won with par on first extra hole
4	2007	PGA Grand Slam of Golf	(Argentina) Ángel Cabrera	Lost to birdie on third extra hole
5	2008	PGA Grand Slam of Golf	(United States) Jim Furyk	Lost to eagle on first extra hole

=== PGA Tour Champions wins (12) ===
Legend
Senior major championships (4)
Charles Schwab Cup playoff events (3)
Other PGA Tour Champions (5)

No.	Date	Tournament	Winning score	Margin of victory	Runner(s)-up
1	26 Jun 2022	U.S. Senior Open	−10 (71-65-66-72=274)	1 stroke	(United States) Steve Stricker
2	21 Aug 2022	Dick's Sporting Goods Open	−16 (66-67-67=200)	3 strokes	(Thailand) Thongchai Jaidee, (Canada) Mike Weir
3	11 Sep 2022	Ascension Charity Classic	−14 (65-66-68=199)	1 stroke	(South Korea) Yang Yong-eun
4	13 Nov 2022	Charles Schwab Cup Championship	−27 (66-64-62-65=257)	7 strokes	(Germany) Alex Čejka
5	25 Jun 2023	Dick's Sporting Goods Open (2)	−18 (69-66-63=198)	1 stroke	(United States) Joe Durant
6	5 Nov 2023	TimberTech Championship	−16 (67-66-64=197)	7 strokes	(Germany) Bernhard Langer, (South Korea) Charlie Wi
7	24 Mar 2024	Hoag Classic Newport Beach	−14 (63-67-69=199)	1 stroke	(Thailand) Thongchai Jaidee
8	23 Jun 2024	Dick's Open (3)	−15 (68-65-68=201)	1 stroke	(Canada) Mike Weir
9	27 Oct 2024	Simmons Bank Championship	−17 (67-65-67=199)	2 strokes	(South Korea) Yang Yong-eun
10	29 Jun 2025	U.S. Senior Open (2)	−11 (67-67-68-67=269)	1 stroke	(United States) Stewart Cink
11	27 Jul 2025	ISPS Handa Senior Open	−16 (67-65-65-67=264)	3 strokes	(Denmark) Thomas Bjørn, (United States) Justin Leonard
12	5 Jul 2026	U.S. Senior Open (3)	−12 (69-67-66-66=268)	4 strokes	(United States) Stewart Cink

PGA Tour Champions playoff record (0–4)

No.	Year	Tournament	Opponent	Result
1	2023	KitchenAid Senior PGA Championship	(United States) Steve Stricker	Lost to par on first extra hole
2	2023	The Senior Open Championship	(Germany) Alex Čejka	Lost to birdie on second extra hole
3	2026	Cologuard Classic	(New Zealand) Steven Alker	Lost to birdie on first extra hole
4	2026	Dick's Open	(United States) Dicky Pride	Lost to par on first extra hole

=== European Senior Tour wins (4) ===
Legend
Senior major championships (4)
Other European Senior Tour (0)

No.	Date	Tournament	Winning score	Margin of victory	Runner(s)-up
1	26 Jun 2022	U.S. Senior Open	−10 (71-65-66-72=274)	1 stroke	(United States) Steve Stricker
2	29 Jun 2025	U.S. Senior Open (2)	−11 (67-67-68-67=269)	1 stroke	(United States) Stewart Cink
3	27 Jul 2025	ISPS Handa Senior Open	−16 (67-65-65-67=264)	3 strokes	(Denmark) Thomas Bjørn, (United States) Justin Leonard
4	5 Jul 2026	U.S. Senior Open (3)	−12 (69-67-66-66=268)	4 strokes	(United States) Stewart Cink

European Senior Tour playoff record (0–2)

No.	Year	Tournament	Opponent	Result
1	2023	KitchenAid Senior PGA Championship	(United States) Steve Stricker	Lost to par on first extra hole
2	2023	The Senior Open Championship	(Germany) Alex Čejka	Lost to birdie on second extra hole

== Major championships ==
=== Wins (3) ===
Year	Championship	54 holes	Winning score	Margin	Runner(s)-up
2007	The Open Championship	6 shot deficit	−7 (69-73-68-67=277)	Playoff^{1}	(Spain) Sergio García
2008	The Open Championship (2)	2 shot deficit	+3 (74-68-72-69=283)	4 strokes	(England) Ian Poulter
2008	PGA Championship	3 shot deficit	−3 (71-74-66-66=277)	2 strokes	(Spain) Sergio García, (United States) Ben Curtis

^{1}Defeated García in a four-hole playoff by 1 stroke: Harrington (3-3-4-5=15), García (5-3-4-4=16)

=== Results timeline ===
Tournament	1996	1997	1998	1999
Masters Tournament				
U.S. Open		CUT	T32	
The Open Championship	T18	T5	CUT	29
PGA Championship		CUT		

Tournament	2000	2001	2002	2003	2004	2005	2006	2007	2008	2009
Masters Tournament	T19	T27	T5	CUT	T13	CUT	T27	T7	T5	T35
U.S. Open	T5	T30	T8	T10	T31	CUT	5	CUT	T36	CUT
The Open Championship	T20	T37	T5	T22	CUT		CUT	1	1	T65
PGA Championship	T58	CUT	T17	T29	T45	CUT	CUT	T42	1	T10

Tournament	2010	2011	2012	2013	2014	2015	2016	2017	2018
Masters Tournament	CUT	CUT	T8	CUT		CUT			
U.S. Open	T22	T45	T4	T21					
The Open Championship	CUT	CUT	T39	T54	CUT	T20	T36	CUT	CUT
PGA Championship	CUT	T64	T18	CUT	CUT	CUT	T13	CUT	CUT

Tournament	2019	2020	2021	2022	2023	2024	2025	2026
Masters Tournament				CUT				
PGA Championship	CUT		T4	CUT	T50	CUT	CUT	T18
U.S. Open					T27			CUT
The Open Championship	CUT	NT	72	CUT	T64	T22	CUT	CUT

Win
Top 10
Did not play

CUT = missed the half-way cut
"T" = tied for place
NT = no tournament due to COVID-19 pandemic

=== Summary ===
Tournament	Wins	2nd	3rd	Top-5	Top-10	Top-25	Events	Cuts made
Masters Tournament	0	0	0	2	4	6	16	9
PGA Championship	1	0	0	2	3	7	27	13
U.S. Open	0	0	0	3	5	7	18	13
The Open Championship	2	0	0	4	4	9	29	17
Totals	3	0	0	11	16	29	90	52

- Most consecutive cuts made – 8 (1999 Open Championship – 2001 Open Championship)
- Longest streak of top-10s – 3 (2002 Masters – 2002 Open Championship)

== Results in The Players Championship ==
Tournament	2001	2002	2003	2004	2005	2006	2007	2008	2009	2010	2011	2012	2013	2014	2015	2016
The Players Championship	T33	T22	T2	2	T63	CUT	T52	CUT	T49	CUT	CUT	CUT	T75		T42	CUT

Top 10
Did not play

CUT = missed the halfway cut
"T" indicates a tie for a place

== Results in World Golf Championships ==
Results not in chronological order before 2015.

Tournament	1999	2000	2001	2002	2003	2004	2005	2006	2007	2008	2009	2010	2011	2012	2013	2014	2015
Championship	T30	T5	NT^{1}	21	T6	T6	67	T17	T19		T20	T3	T10		T39		
Match Play		R64	R64	R64	R32	QF	R32	QF	R32	R32	R64	R64	R64		R64		
Invitational	T12	T27	T17	T47	T39	74	T24	T27	T14	T20	T2	T9	T59				T70
Champions											T25	T16					

^{1}Cancelled due to 9/11

Top 10
Did not play

QF, R16, R32, R64 = Round in which player lost in match play
"T" = tied
NT = No tournament
Note that the HSBC Champions did not become a WGC event until 2009.

== Senior major championships ==
=== Wins (4) ===
Year	Championship	54 holes	Winning score	Margin	Runner-up
2022	U.S. Senior Open	5 shot lead	−10 (71-65-66-72=274)	1 stroke	(United States) Steve Stricker
2025	U.S. Senior Open (2)	Tied for lead	–11 (67-67-68-67=269)	1 stroke	(United States) Stewart Cink
2025	ISPS Handa Senior Open	2 shot lead	−16 (67-65-65-67=264)	3 strokes	(Denmark) Thomas Bjørn, (United States) Justin Leonard
2026	U.S. Senior Open (3)	1 shot deficit	–12 (69-67-66-66=268)	4 strokes	(United States) Stewart Cink

=== Results timeline ===
Results not in chronological order

Tournament	2022	2023	2024	2025	2026
Senior PGA Championship	T20	2	T17	T2	T8
The Tradition	2	T5	T8		T11
U.S. Senior Open	1	T18	T16	1	1
Senior Players Championship				T30	
The Senior Open Championship	2	2	T5	1	T41

Win
Top 10
Did not play

"T" indicates a tie for a place

== Team appearances ==
Amateur

- Jacques Léglise Trophy (representing Great Britain & Ireland): 1988 (winners), 1989 (winners)
- European Amateur Team Championship (representing Ireland): 1991, 1993, 1995
- Walker Cup (representing Great Britain & Ireland): 1991, 1993, 1995 (winners)
- European Youths' Team Championship (representing Ireland): 1992,
- St Andrews Trophy (representing Great Britain and Ireland): 1992 (winners), 1994 (winners)

Professional

- Alfred Dunhill Cup (representing Ireland): 1996, 1997, 1998, 1999, 2000
- World Cup (representing Ireland): 1996, 1997 (winners), 1998, 1999, 2000, 2001, 2002, 2003, 2004, 2005, 2006
- Ryder Cup (representing Europe): 1999, 2002 (winners), 2004 (winners), 2006 (winners), 2008, 2010 (winners), 2021 (non-playing captain)
  - Record: 25 matches, 10.5 points
  - All formats (W–L–H): 9–13–3 = 10.5 pts
    - Singles: 3–3–0 = 3 pts
    - Foursomes: 3–4–3 = 4.5 pts
    - Fourballs: 3–6–0 = 3 pts
- Seve Trophy (representing Great Britain & Ireland): 2000, 2002 (winners), 2003 (winners), 2005 (winners)

== See also ==
- List of men's major championships winning golfers
- List of golfers with most European Tour wins
- List of golfers with most PGA Tour wins
- List of golfers with most PGA Tour Champions wins
- List of people on the postage stamps of Ireland
- Golf in Ireland
