= Tobias Dier =

German professional golfer

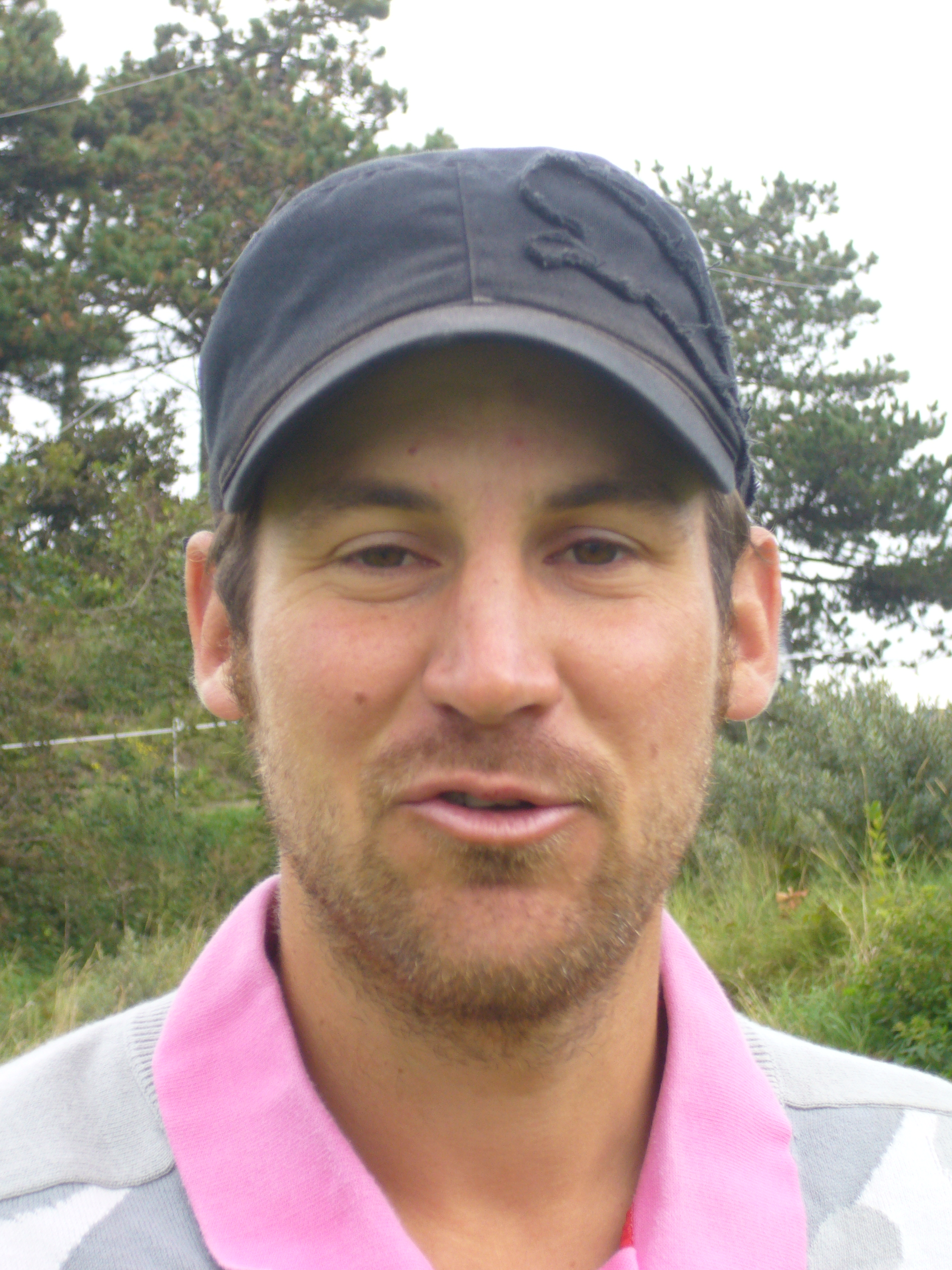

Personal information
- Full name: Tobias Dier
- Nationality: Germany
- Born: 29 September 1976 (age 50) Nürnberg, Germany
- Height: 1.87 m (6 ft 2 in)

Career
- Sport: Golf
- Turned professional: 1998
- Former tours: European Tour; Challenge Tour
- Professional wins: 3

Number of wins by tour
- European Tour: 2
- Challenge Tour: 1

Tobias Dier (born 29 September 1976) is a German professional golfer.

== Career ==
Dier was born in Nürnberg. He won the 1998 German Amateur Open Championship and turned professional later that year. He won a European Tour card by finishing sixth on the Challenge Tour Order of Merit in 1998. He has two European Tour wins, the 2001 North West of Ireland Open, and the 2002 TNT Dutch Open, including a round of 60 at the Hilversum Golf Club. Since then he struggled for form and dropped back down to the Challenge Tour from 2006.

== Amateur wins ==
- 1998 German Amateur Open Championship

== Professional wins (3) ==
=== European Tour wins (2) ===
No.	Date	Tournament	Winning score	Margin of victory	Runner-up
1	19 Aug 2001	North West of Ireland Open^{1}	−17 (66-68-66-71=271)	1 stroke	(Wales) Stephen Dodd
2	28 Jul 2002	TNT Dutch Open	−17 (60-67-67-69=263)	1 stroke	(England) Jamie Spence

^{1}Dual-ranking event with the Challenge Tour

=== Challenge Tour wins (1) ===
No.	Date	Tournament	Winning score	Margin of victory	Runner-up
1	19 Aug 2001	North West of Ireland Open^{1}	−17 (66-68-66-71=271)	1 stroke	(Wales) Stephen Dodd

^{1}Dual-ranking event with the European Tour

Challenge Tour playoff record (0–1)

No.	Year	Tournament	Opponent	Result
1	2007	OKI Mahou Challenge de España	(Chile) Felipe Aguilar	Lost to par on first extra hole

=== EPD Tour wins (1) ===
No.	Date	Tournament	Winning score	Margin of victory	Runners-up
1	5 Oct 2008	JOB AG EPD Championship	−9 (68-72-67=207)	1 stroke	(Germany) Kariem Baraka, (Germany) Nicolas Meitinger

== Results in World Golf Championships ==
Tournament	2002
Match Play	
Championship	
Invitational	T68

Did not play

"T" = Tied

== Team appearances ==
Amateur

- European Youths' Team Championship (representing Germany): 1996
- European Amateur Team Championship (representing Germany): 1997
- Eisenhower Trophy (representing Germany): 1996
- Bonallack Trophy (representing Europe): 1998 (winners)
