= Roger Chapman (golfer) =

English professional golfer

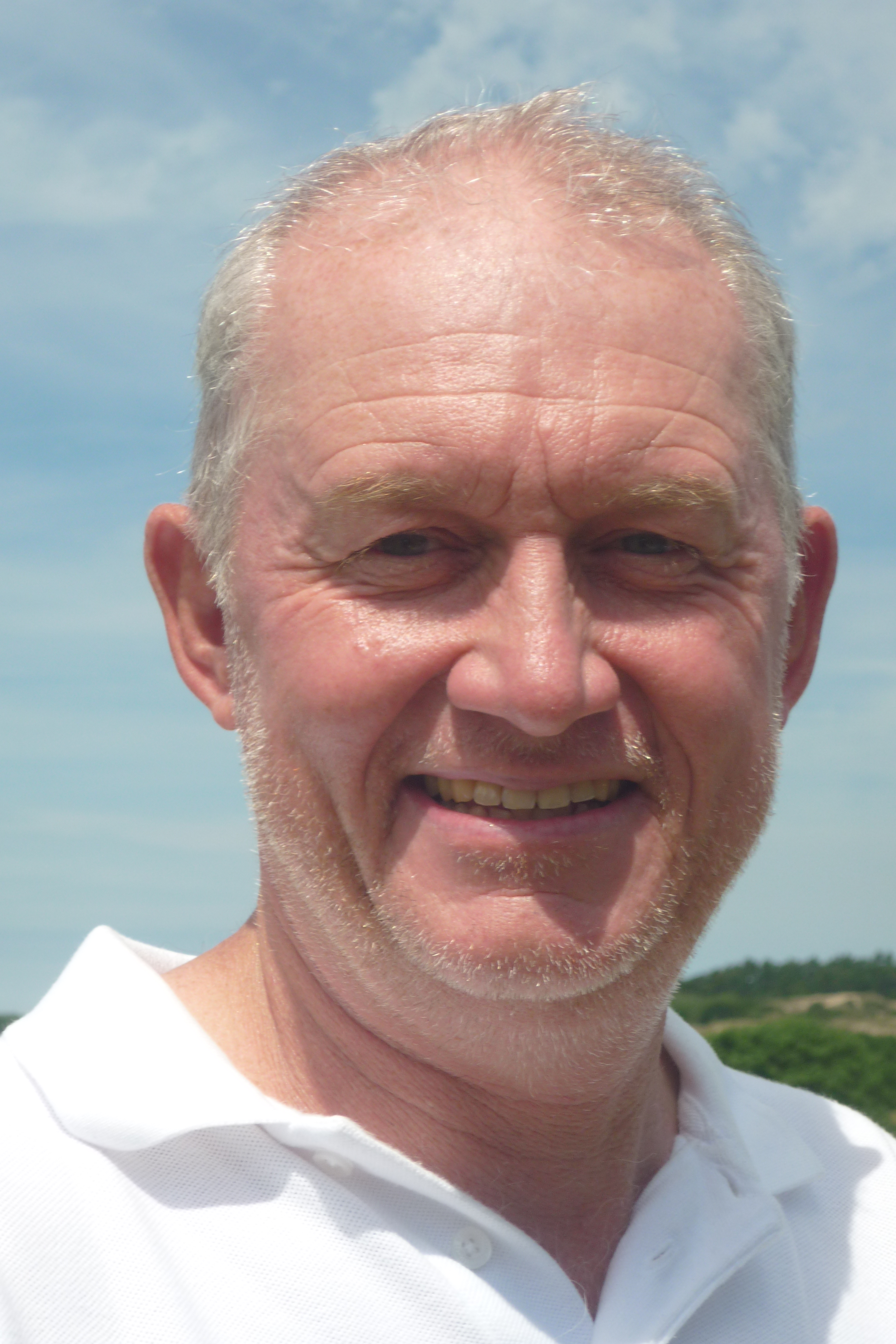

Personal information
- Full name: Roger Michael Chapman
- Nationality: England
- Born: 1 May 1959 (age 67) Nakuru, Kenya
- Height: 6 ft 0 in (1.83 m)
- Weight: 182 lb (83 kg; 13.0 st)
- Spouse: Cathy (m. 1985)
- Children: 2

Career
- Sport: Golf
- Turned professional: 1981
- Current tour: European Senior Tour
- Former tours: European Tour; PGA Tour Champions
- Professional wins: 7
- Highest ranking: 90 (20 August 1989)

Number of wins by tour
- European Tour: 1
- PGA Tour Champions: 2
- European Senior Tour: 3
- Other: 3

Best results in major championships
- Masters Tournament: DNP
- PGA Championship: CUT: 2012
- U.S. Open: DNP
- The Open Championship: T12: 1991

Achievements and awards
- European Senior Tour Order of Merit winner: 2012

Roger Michael Chapman (born 1 May 1959) is a retired English professional golfer who played on the European Tour and later on the PGA Tour Champions as well as the European Senior Tour. He won two senior majors in 2012, the Senior PGA Championship and the U.S. Senior Open.

== Amateur career ==
Chapman was born in Nakuru, Kenya, where his father worked for the Ministry of Agriculture. After a spell living in Trinidad, the family returned to England when Chapman was about five years old. His biggest individual successes as an amateur were winning the 1979 English Amateur and the 1981 Lytham Trophy. He represented Great Britain & Ireland in the 1981 Walker Cup where, although the United States won the match 15–9, Chapman won three of his four matches. He beat Bob Lewis in first day's singles and then beat Hal Sutton twice on the final day, in both the foursomes and the singles.

== Professional career ==
Chapman turned professional in late-1981 and won a European Tour card on his first visit to the Qualifying School. From 1982 to 2002 he finished in the top 100 on the European Order of Merit 19 out of the 21 years, with a best ranking of 17th in 1988. In his first season, 1982, he finished joint runner-up behind Sam Torrance in the Spanish Open. After six second-place finishes on the tour, he won the 2000 Brazil Rio de Janeiro 500 Years Open on his 472nd tour start. He also won the 1988 Zimbabwe Open on the Safari Circuit and the Hassan II Golf Trophy in Morocco in 2000. He represented England in the 2000 Alfred Dunhill Cup.

In May 2012, Chapman won the Senior PGA Championship, one of the five senior major championships for his maiden victory on the Champions Tour. After holding a five stroke lead entering the final round, he prevailed by two over American John Cook. He won his second senior major in July 2012 at the U.S. Senior Open. He won by two strokes over Fred Funk, Bernhard Langer, Tom Lehman, and Corey Pavin. In December 2018 he won the MCB Tour Championship – Seychelles on the European Senior Tour, beating Phillip Price with an eagle 3 at the first hole of a sudden-death playoff. Earlier Tom Lehman and Miguel Ángel Martín came to the final hole needing a par-5 to tie with Chapman and Price but took 6 and 8 respectively.

== Amateur wins ==
- 1979 Sunningdale Foursomes (with George Will), English Amateur
- 1981 Lake Macquarie Amateur, Lytham Trophy

== Professional wins (7) ==
=== European Tour wins (1) ===
No.	Date	Tournament	Winning score	Margin of victory	Runner-up
1	26 Mar 2000	Brazil Rio de Janeiro 500 Years Open	−18 (70-64-71-65=270)	Playoff	(Republic of Ireland) Pádraig Harrington

European Tour playoff record (1–2)

No.	Year	Tournament	Opponent(s)	Result
1	1988	BNP Jersey Open	(Republic of Ireland) Des Smyth	Lost to birdie on fifth extra hole
2	1989	KLM Dutch Open	(Spain) José María Olazábal, (Northern Ireland) Ronan Rafferty	Olazábal won with double-bogey on ninth extra hole Chapman eliminated by par on first hole
3	2000	Brazil Rio de Janeiro 500 Years Open	(Republic of Ireland) Pádraig Harrington	Won with par on second extra hole

=== Safari Circuit wins (1) ===
No.	Date	Tournament	Winning score	Margin of victory	Runner-up
1	21 Feb 1988	Zimbabwe Open	−6 (63-70-71-71=275)	1 stroke	(Fiji) Vijay Singh

=== Other wins (2) ===
- 1990 J. P. McManus Pro-Am (shared with Neil Hansen)
- 2000 Hassan II Golf Trophy

=== Champions Tour wins (2) ===
Legend
Senior major championships (2)
Other Champions Tour (0)

No.	Date	Tournament	Winning score	Margin of victory	Runner(s)-up
1	28 May 2012	Senior PGA Championship	−13 (68-67-64-72=271)	2 strokes	(United States) John Cook
2	15 Jul 2012	U.S. Senior Open	−10 (68-68-68-66=270)	2 strokes	(United States) Fred Funk, (Germany) Bernhard Langer, (United States) Tom Lehman, (United States) Corey Pavin

=== European Senior Tour wins (3) ===
Legend
Senior major championships (2)
Tour Championships (1)
Other European Senior Tour (0)

No.	Date	Tournament	Winning score	Margin of victory	Runner(s)-up
1	28 May 2012	Senior PGA Championship	−13 (68-67-64-72=271)	2 strokes	(United States) John Cook
2	15 Jul 2012	U.S. Senior Open	−10 (68-68-68-66=270)	2 strokes	(United States) Fred Funk, (Germany) Bernhard Langer, (United States) Tom Lehman, (United States) Corey Pavin
3	16 Dec 2018	MCB Tour Championship (Seychelles)	−6 (44-66-65=175)*	Playoff	(Wales) Phillip Price

*Note: The 2018 MCB Tour Championship (Seychelles) was shortened to 48 holes due to bad weather.

European Senior Tour playoff record (1–1)

No.	Year	Tournament	Opponent	Result
1	2010	Mauritius Commercial Bank Open	(South Africa) David Frost	Lost to par on second extra hole
2	2018	MCB Tour Championship (Seychelles)	(Wales) Phillip Price	Won with eagle on first extra hole

== Results in major championships ==
Tournament	1977	1978	1979
The Open Championship	CUT		
PGA Championship			

Tournament	1980	1981	1982	1983	1984	1985	1986	1987	1988	1989
The Open Championship		CUT	T47		T47	CUT	T35	T54	CUT	T13
PGA Championship										

Tournament	1990	1991	1992	1993	1994	1995	1996	1997	1998	1999
The Open Championship	T63	T12	T64	CUT			T72			
PGA Championship										

Tournament	2000	2001	2002	2003	2004	2005	2006	2007	2008	2009
The Open Championship	CUT	CUT	DQ							
PGA Championship										

Tournament	2010	2011	2012
The Open Championship			
PGA Championship			CUT

Note: Chapman never played in the Masters Tournament or the U.S. Open.

Did not play

CUT = missed the half-way cut (3rd round cut in 1981 Open Championship)
DQ = Disqualified
"T" = tied

== Senior major championships ==
=== Wins (2) ===
Year	Championship	54 holes	Winning score	Margin	Runner(s)-up
2012	Senior PGA Championship	5 shot lead	−13 (68-67-64-72=271)	2 strokes	(United States) John Cook
2012	U.S. Senior Open	4 shot deficit	−10 (68-68-68-66=270)	2 strokes	(United States) Fred Funk, (Germany) Bernhard Langer, (United States) Tom Lehman, (United States) Corey Pavin

=== Results timeline ===
Results not in chronological order before 2022.

Tournament	2009	2010	2011	2012	2013	2014	2015	2016	2017	2018	2019	2020	2021	2022	2023	2024
The Tradition				T55	T41	T23	74	T76	65			NT				
Senior PGA Championship	T59	T69	T27	1	T64	T55	T13	T60	T66			NT		T50	CUT	CUT
U.S. Senior Open				1	CUT	T20	CUT	CUT	53		T33	NT	CUT	CUT		
Senior Players Championship				T14	T18	T65	T39	T61	T60							
Senior British Open Championship	WD	CUT	T58	WD	CUT	T19	CUT	T30	T43	T48	T10	NT	T57	CUT	T61	CUT

Win
Top 10
Did not play

CUT = missed the halfway cut
WD = withdrew
"T" indicates a tie for a place
NT = no tournament due to COVID-19 pandemic

== Team appearances ==
Amateur

- St Andrews Trophy (representing Great Britain and Ireland): 1980 (winners)
- European Amateur Team Championship (representing England): 1981 (winners)
- Walker Cup (representing Great Britain & Ireland): 1981

Professional

- Alfred Dunhill Cup (representing England): 2000
