= Thomas Bjørn =

Danish professional golfer (born 1971)

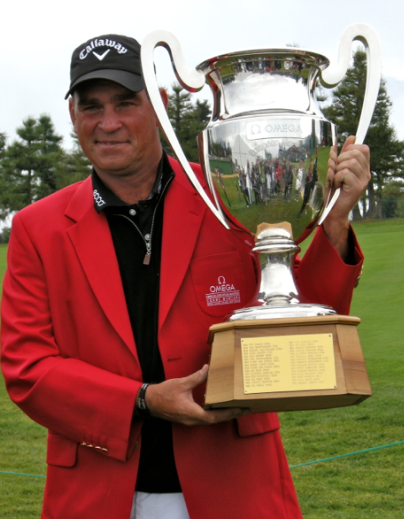
- Bjørn after winning the 2011 Omega European Masters

Personal information
- Full name: Thomas Bjørn
- Nickname: The Great Dane
- Nationality: Denmark
- Born: 18 February 1971 (age 55) Silkeborg, Denmark
- Height: 1.89 m (6 ft 2 in)
- Weight: 88 kg (194 lb; 13.9 st)
- Children: 4

Career
- Sport: Golf
- Turned professional: 1993
- Current tours: European Tour; PGA Tour Champions; European Senior Tour
- Professional wins: 25
- Highest ranking: 10 (15 July 2001)

Number of wins by tour
- European Tour: 15
- Japan Golf Tour: 2
- Asian Tour: 2
- Sunshine Tour: 1
- Challenge Tour: 3
- PGA Tour Champions: 2
- European Senior Tour: 2
- Other: 1

Best results in major championships
- Masters Tournament: T8: 2014
- PGA Championship: T2: 2005
- U.S. Open: T22: 2001
- The Open Championship: T2: 2000, 2003

Achievements and awards
- Challenge Tour Rankings winner: 1995
- Sir Henry Cotton Rookie of the Year: 1996

Thomas Bjørn (born 18 February 1971) is a Danish professional golfer who plays on the European Tour. He is the most successful Danish golfer to have played the game having won fifteen tournaments worldwide on the European Tour. In 1997 he also became the first Dane to qualify for a European Ryder Cup team. He captained the winning European side at the 2018 Ryder Cup.

== Professional career ==
Bjørn started his career playing on the Challenge Tour from 1993 to 1995. In 1995 he won four tournaments on the Challenge Tour to earn his card for his debut year on the European Tour in 1996. Bjørn made his breakthrough immediately winning his maiden tour title in his debut season at the Loch Lomond World Invitational. He became the first golfer from Denmark to win a tournament on the European Tour. He finished the 1996 season placed tenth on the Order of Merit.

The follow-up season in 1997 was steady with a number of top ten finishes without a win, however Bjørn did not have long to wait until his next win arrived. He won early in the 1998 season in Perth, Australia taking the Heineken Classic for his second European Tour title. Despite an over par final round of 74, Bjørn won by a single stroke from Ian Woosnam. In April 1998, after a five-week break from competitive golf, Bjørn won for the second time that year at the Peugeot Open de España after a final round 66 took him to 21 under and one stroke ahead of the chasing pack. He later said: "I didn’t really expect this after taking five weeks off, but when your confidence has gone like mine did after winning in Perth, it just shows it’s best to take a break and regroup." After his two wins he finished the year 6th on the Order of Merit.

After a winless period due to injuries and the birth of his first child, Bjørn returned to the winner's circle in October 1999 at the Sarazen World Open. This was his fourth career European Tour win and after an unspectacular year, he jumped up the standings to finish the season 14th on the Order of Merit.

He has finished in the top ten on the Order of Merit eight times with a best finish of fifth in 2000. He came close to winning a major championship at the 2003 Open Championship when he was in the lead with 4 holes to play before a slump handed victory to Ben Curtis. At the 2005 PGA Championship, he was tied for the lead before finishing as runner-up to Phil Mickelson in a second-place tie with Steve Elkington.

Bjørn picked up his first European Tour win in four years and 10th of his career in 2010 at the Estoril Open de Portugal, winning with a score of 23-under-par, five better than Richard Green. He followed this with three more wins at the Commercialbank Qatar Masters in February 2011, Johnnie Walker Championship at Gleneagles in August 2011, winning in a five-man playoff on the fifth extra hole, birdieing the final three holes and the Omega European Masters in September 2011. In December 2013, Bjørn won the Nedbank Golf Challenge in South Africa. It was Bjørn's 14th career European Tour win.

Bjørn was a member of the winning European Ryder Cup teams in 1997, 2002 and 2014. He also captained the 2018 European Ryder Cup team, winning over the United States with 17½ points to 10½ at Le Golf National, Paris, France.

He made the top 10 of the Official World Golf Ranking for one week in 2001 after a second-place finish at the Scottish Open at Loch Lomond.

In 2005 and 2006, Bjørn sponsored the Thomas Bjørn Open, an event on the Challenge Tour played in his home country. In 2007, Bjørn was elected chairman of the European Tour's tournament committee. In May 2022, Bjørn was named vice-captain by Team Europe's captain Henrik Stenson for the 2023 Ryder Cup in Rome.

Bjørn's last name is sometimes written Björn or Bjorn outside Denmark. The Danish (and Norwegian) letter 'ø' represents approximately the same sound as 'ö' in German and Swedish. Literally translated, his surname means bear in Danish.

== Personal life ==
Bjørn has three children, Filippa and twins Oliver and Julia with his former wife Pernilla. Bjørn currently resides in London. Perth-born air stewardess Dagmara Leniartek had a five-year affair with Bjørn. Bjørn initially cut relations with Leniartek and denied he was the father of her daughter. However, Danish media reported a DNA test had subsequently proved Bjørn was the father of the child – a girl named Isabella.

Bjørn is a football fan and a keen follower of Liverpool F.C. Alongside football he also states his other interest to be movies.

== Professional wins (25) ==
=== European Tour wins (15) ===
No.	Date	Tournament	Winning score	Margin of victory	Runner(s)-up
1	22 Sep 1996	Loch Lomond World Invitational	−11 (70-68-69-70=277)	1 stroke	(France) Jean van de Velde
2	1 Feb 1998	Heineken Classic	−8 (70-68-68-74=280)	1 stroke	(Wales) Ian Woosnam
3	26 Apr 1998	Peugeot Open de España	−21 (68-67-66-66=267)	1 stroke	(Australia) Greg Chalmers, (Spain) José María Olazábal
4	17 Oct 1999	Sarazen World Open	−15 (66-69-70-68=273)	2 strokes	(Switzerland) Paolo Quirici, (Japan) Katsuyoshi Tomori
5	3 Sep 2000	BMW International Open	−20 (69-63-69-67=268)	3 strokes	(Germany) Bernhard Langer
6	4 Mar 2001	Dubai Desert Classic	−22 (64-66-67-69=266)	2 strokes	(Republic of Ireland) Pádraig Harrington, (United States) Tiger Woods
7	1 Sep 2002	BMW International Open (2)	−24 (68-64-66-66=264)	4 strokes	(England) John Bickerton, (Germany) Bernhard Langer
8	15 May 2005	Daily Telegraph Dunlop Masters	−6 (73-68-73-68=282)	Playoff	(England) Brian Davis, (England) David Howell
9	21 May 2006	Nissan Irish Open	−5 (78-66-67-72=283)	1 stroke	(England) Paul Casey
10	13 Jun 2010	Estoril Open de Portugal	−23 (67-65-65-68=265)	5 strokes	(Australia) Richard Green
11	6 Feb 2011	Commercialbank Qatar Masters	−14 (74-65-66-69=274)	4 strokes	(Spain) Álvaro Quirós
12	28 Aug 2011	Johnnie Walker Championship at Gleneagles	−11 (68-69-71-69=277)	Playoff	(South Africa) George Coetzee, (England) Mark Foster, (Spain) Pablo Larrazábal, (Austria) Bernd Wiesberger
13	4 Sep 2011	Omega European Masters^{1}	−20 (68-68-66-62=264)	4 strokes	(Germany) Martin Kaymer
14	8 Sep 2013	Omega European Masters^{1} (2)	−20 (66-66-67-65=264)	Playoff	(Scotland) Craig Lee
15	8 Dec 2013 (2014 season)	Nedbank Golf Challenge^{2}	−20 (67-70-66-65=268)	2 strokes	(Wales) Jamie Donaldson, (Spain) Sergio García

^{1}Co-sanctioned by the Asian Tour
^{2}Co-sanctioned by the Sunshine Tour

European Tour playoff record (3–2)

No.	Year	Tournament	Opponent(s)	Result
1	2003	Deutsche Bank - SAP Open TPC of Europe	(Republic of Ireland) Pádraig Harrington	Lost to par on first extra hole
2	2003	Nissan Irish Open	(New Zealand) Michael Campbell, (Sweden) Peter Hedblom	Campbell won with birdie on first extra hole
3	2005	Daily Telegraph Dunlop Masters	(England) Brian Davis, (England) David Howell	Won with par on second extra hole Davis eliminated by par on first hole
4	2011	Johnnie Walker Championship at Gleneagles	(South Africa) George Coetzee, (England) Mark Foster, (Spain) Pablo Larrazábal, (Austria) Bernd Wiesberger	Won with birdie on fifth extra hole Foster eliminated by par on fourth hole Larrazábal eliminated by par on second hole Wiesberger eliminated by par on first hole
5	2013	Omega European Masters	(Scotland) Craig Lee	Won with birdie on first extra hole

=== Japan Golf Tour wins (2) ===
No.	Date	Tournament	Winning score	Margin of victory	Runner-up
1	21 Nov 1999	Dunlop Phoenix Tournament	−14 (69-66-68-67=270)	Playoff	(Spain) Sergio García
2	23 Nov 2003	Dunlop Phoenix Tournament (2)	−12 (67-65-69-71=272)	2 strokes	(Japan) Daisuke Maruyama

Japan Golf Tour playoff record (1–0)

No.	Year	Tournament	Opponent	Result
1	1999	Dunlop Phoenix Tournament	(Spain) Sergio García	Won with birdie on fourth extra hole

=== Challenge Tour wins (3) ===
No.	Date	Tournament	Winning score	Margin of victory	Runner(s)-up
1	11 Jun 1995	Himmerland Open	E (70-70-76=216)	Playoff	(Finland) Anssi Kankkonen, (Belgium) Nicolas Vanhootegem
2	23 Jul 1995	Interlaken Open	−16 (64-71-65=200)	3 strokes	(Switzerland) André Bossert
3	28 Aug 1995	Coca-Cola Open	−8 (70-70-69-71=280)	1 stroke	(Sweden) Freddie Jacobson

Challenge Tour playoff record (1–0)

No.	Year	Tournament	Opponents	Result
1	1995	Himmerland Open	(Finland) Anssi Kankkonen, (Belgium) Nicolas Vanhootegem	Won with birdie on first extra hole

=== Other wins (1) ===
No.	Date	Tournament	Winning score	Margin of victory	Runner-up
1	13 Aug 1995	Esbjerg Danish Closed	−4 (73-75-64=212)	Playoff	(Denmark) Ben Tinning

Other playoff record (1–1)

No.	Year	Tournament	Opponent(s)	Result
1	1995	Esbjerg Danish Closed	(Denmark) Ben Tinning	Won with birdie on first extra hole
2	2001	WGC-World Cup (with (Denmark) Søren Hansen)	New Zealand − Michael Campbell and David Smail, South Africa − Retief Goosen and Ernie Els, United States − David Duval and Tiger Woods	South Africa won with par on second extra hole New Zealand and United States eliminated by birdie on first hole

=== PGA Tour Champions wins (2) ===
No.	Date	Tournament	Winning score	Margin of victory	Runner(s)-up
1	8 Jun 2025	American Family Insurance Championship (with (Northern Ireland) Darren Clarke)	−32 (59-58-64=181)	4 strokes	(United States) Doug Barron and (United States) Dicky Pride, (Germany) Alex Čejka and (Denmark) Søren Kjeldsen, (United States) Steve Flesch and (United States) Paul Goydos, (United States) Steve Stricker and (United States) Mario Tiziani
2	7 Sep 2025	Stifel Charity Classic	−12 (65-69-67=201)	Playoff	(Australia) Cameron Percy

PGA Tour Champions playoff record (1–0)

No.	Year	Tournament	Opponent	Result
1	2025	Stifel Charity Classic	(Australia) Cameron Percy	Won with birdie on first extra hole

=== European Senior Tour wins (2) ===
Legend
Tour Championships (1)
Other European Senior Tour (1)

No.	Date	Tournament	Winning score	Margin of victory	Runner(s)-up
1	22 Aug 2021	Irish Legends	−15 (67-66-65=198)	Playoff	(Wales) Phillip Price
2	11 Dec 2022	MCB Tour Championship (Mauritius)	−20 (68-61-67=196)	7 strokes	(England) Simon P. Brown, (South Africa) James Kingston

European Senior Tour playoff record (1–0)

No.	Year	Tournament	Opponent	Result
1	2021	Irish Legends	(Wales) Phillip Price	Won with birdie on second extra hole

== Results in major championships ==
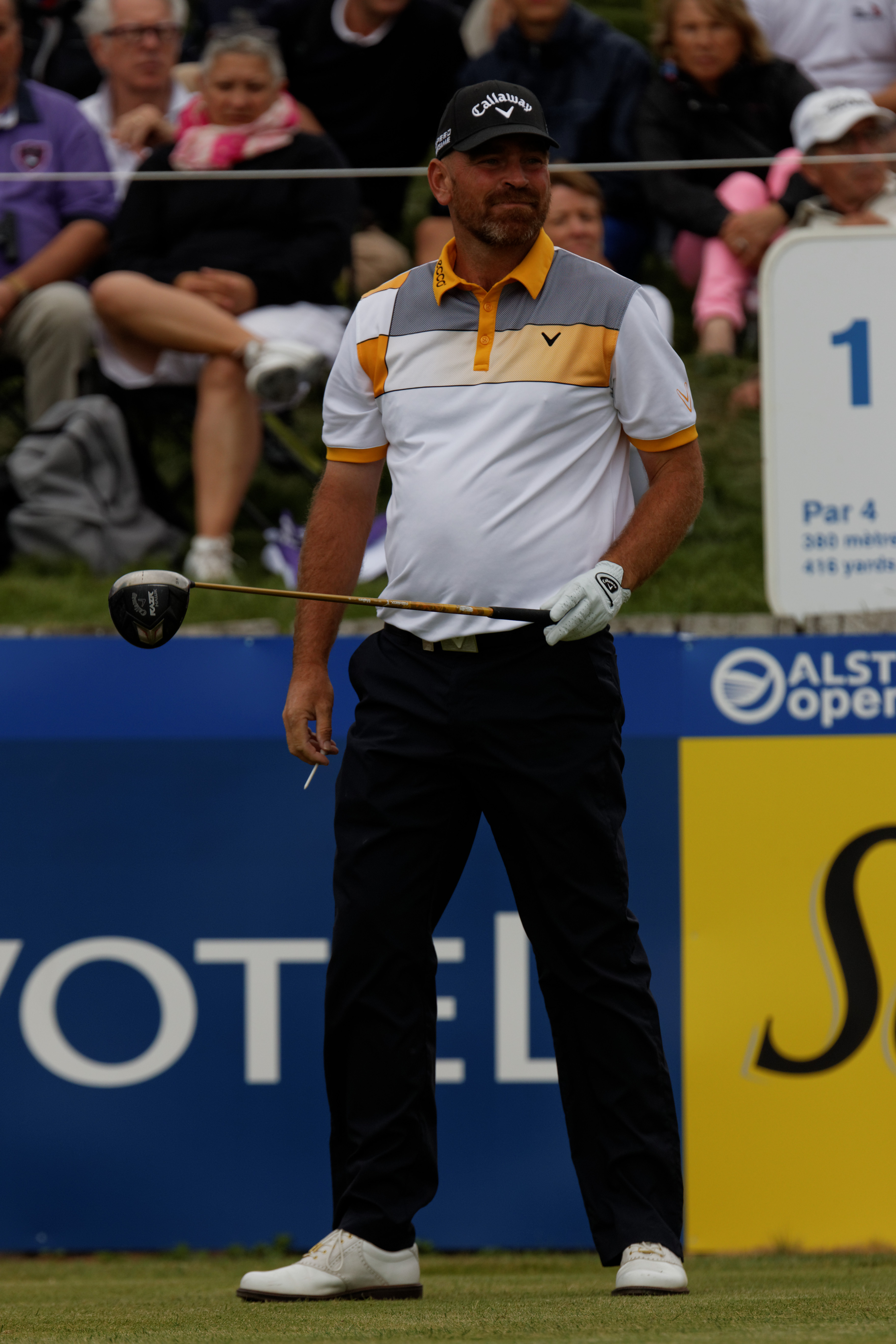
Thomas Bjørn

Tournament	1996	1997	1998	1999
Masters Tournament				CUT
U.S. Open		T68	T25	CUT
The Open Championship	CUT	CUT	T9	T30
PGA Championship		T45	CUT	T70

Tournament	2000	2001	2002	2003	2004	2005	2006	2007	2008	2009
Masters Tournament	T28	CUT	T18		CUT	T25	T32	CUT		
U.S. Open	T46	T22	T37	CUT	CUT	T52	T48	CUT		
The Open Championship	T2	CUT	T8	T2	CUT	CUT	T41	T53		
PGA Championship	3	T63	CUT	CUT		T2	CUT	T62		

Tournament	2010	2011	2012	2013	2014	2015	2016	2017
Masters Tournament			T37	T46	T8	CUT		
U.S. Open			CUT					
The Open Championship	CUT	4	T54	T73	T26	CUT		
PGA Championship		CUT	T48	CUT	CUT	T48		CUT

Top 10
Did not play

CUT = missed the half-way cut
"T" = tied

=== Summary ===
Tournament	Wins	2nd	3rd	Top-5	Top-10	Top-25	Events	Cuts made
Masters Tournament	0	0	0	0	1	3	12	7
U.S. Open	0	0	0	0	0	2	12	7
The Open Championship	0	2	0	3	5	5	18	11
PGA Championship	0	1	1	2	2	2	16	8
Totals	0	3	1	5	8	12	58	33

- Most consecutive cuts made – 6 (1999 Open Championship – 2000 PGA)
- Longest streak of top-10s – 2 (2000 Open Championship – 2000 PGA)

== Results in The Players Championship ==
Tournament	2000	2001	2002	2003	2004	2005	2006	2007	2008	2009	2010	2011	2012	2013	2014
The Players Championship	T22	CUT	T22		T22	WD	69								CUT

Did not play

CUT = missed the halfway cut
WD = withdrew
"T" indicates a tie for a place

== Results in World Golf Championships ==
Results not in chronological order prior to 2015.

Tournament	1999	2000	2001	2002	2003	2004	2005	2006	2007	2008	2009	2010	2011	2012	2013	2014	2015
Championship	T59	T40	NT^{1}	T27	T28	2	WD	T41	T11				T28	T24		T44	WD
Match Play	R32	R16			R64	R32	R64		R64				R32	R64	R64	R32	
Invitational		T10	T31	T15	T61		18	T18					T68	T40		T15	69
Champions													T42	T21	T39	T41	

^{1}Cancelled due to 9/11

Top 10
Did not play

WD = Withdrew
QF, R16, R32, R64 = Round in which player lost in match play
"T" = Tied
NT = No tournament
Note that the HSBC Champions did not become a WGC event until 2009.

== Team appearances ==
Amateur

- Jacques Léglise Trophy (representing the Continent of Europe): 1988
- European Youths' Team Championship (representing Denmark): 1990
- St Andrews Trophy (representing the Continent of Europe): 1990
- European Amateur Team Championship (representing Denmark): 1991
- Eisenhower Trophy (representing Denmark): 1992

Professional

- World Cup (representing Denmark): 1996, 1997, 2001, 2006, 2013
- Ryder Cup (representing Europe): 1997 (winners), 2002 (winners), 2014 (winners), 2018 (non-playing captain) (winners)

Ryder Cup points record
1997	1999	2002	2004	2006	2008	2010	2012	2014	Total
1.5	-	2	-	-	-	-	-	0.5	4

- Seve Trophy (representing Continental Europe): 2000 (winners), 2002, 2003, 2005, 2007, 2009 (non-playing captain), 2011, 2013 (winners)
- Royal Trophy (representing Europe): 2006 (winners)
- EurAsia Cup (representing Europe): 2014, 2018 (non-playing captain, winners)

== See also ==
- List of golfers with most European Tour wins
