= Deutsche Bank Players Championship of Europe =

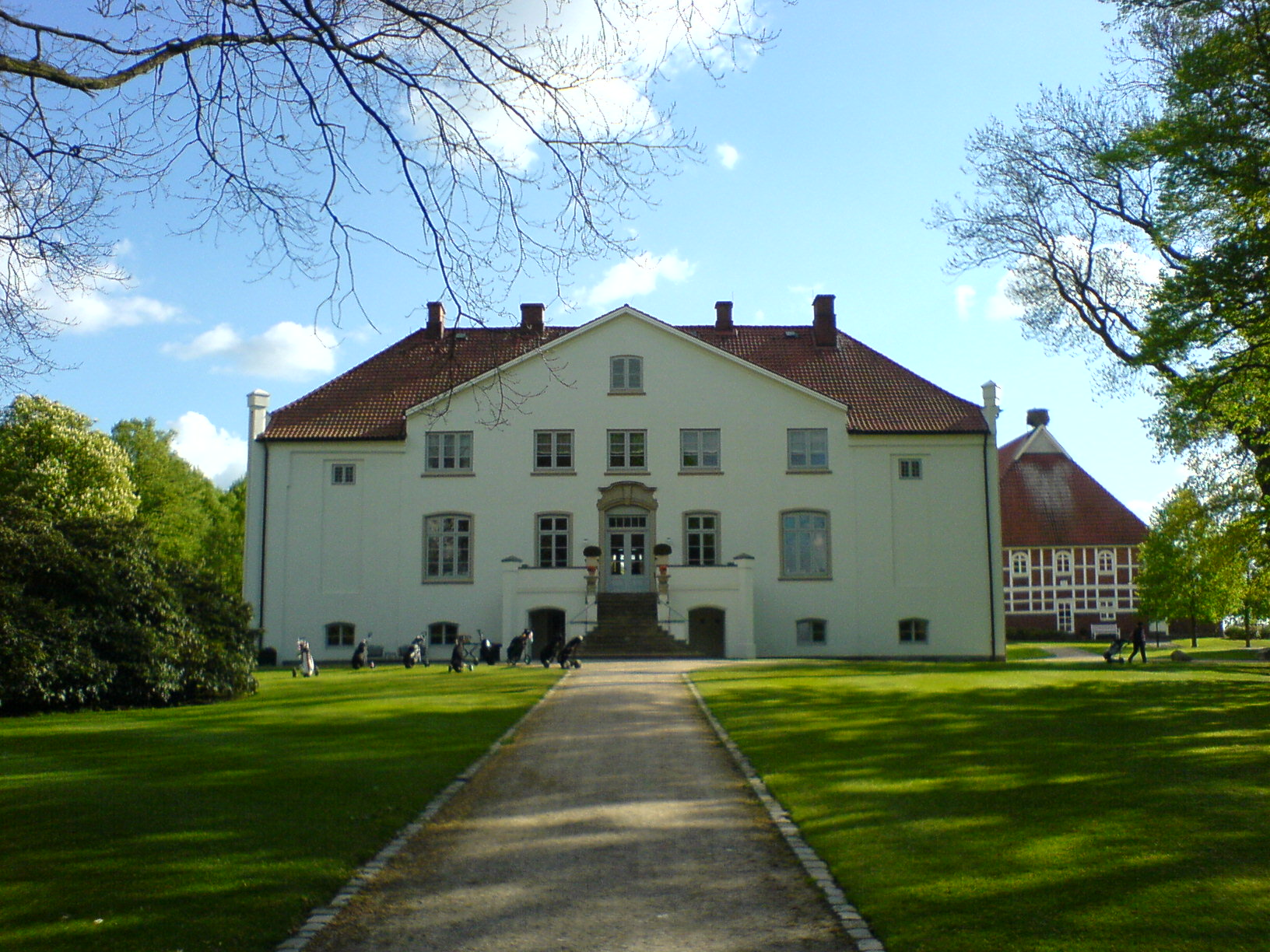
- Gut Kaden

Tournament information
- Location: Alveslohe, Germany
- Established: 1992
- Course: Gut Kaden Golf Club
- Par: 72
- Length: 7,290 yards (6,670 m)
- Tour: European Tour
- Format: Stroke play
- Prize fund: €3,600,000
- Month played: July
- Final year: 2007

Tournament record score
- Aggregate: 263 Robert Karlsson (2006)
- To par: −25 as above

Final champion
- (Argentina) Andrés Romero
- Location in Germany Location in Schleswig-Holstein

The Deutsche Bank Players Championship of Europe was an annual 72-hole stroke play professional golf tournament for men. It was last played in Germany and was part of the European Tour schedule. The tournament was founded in 1992 as the Honda Open and acquired the tag of The Players Championship of Europe or TPC of Europe in 1995. It was last played at Gut Kaden. The prize fund in 2007 was €3.6 million, which put it in the top group of European Tour events outside the major championships and World Golf Championships, but not at the head of the list.

The parallels between this tournament and the PGA Tour's Players Championship are not very strong. The European Players Championship was not the richest event on the European Tour and it was not played close to the Tour's headquarters. The Players Championship's closest parallel in Europe is perhaps the BMW PGA Championship, although that was originally the British PGA Championship, and thus equivalent to the PGA Championship, organised by the PGA of America, which is a major championship and is now a European Tour event.

Before it was attached to the event in Germany, the TPC/Players Championship tag was applied briefly to European Tour events in England and Portugal. It was more of a marketing tool than a genuine indication that the event is different from other leading European Tour events in any important way.

Tiger Woods has played in the tournament several times. He was said to have received large appearance fees, which give rise to some controversy as appearance fees are not normally paid by European Tour events which actually take place in Europe. They are more common in less prestigious tournaments.

The tournament was dropped from the 2008 European Tour schedule.

== Winners ==
Year	Winner	Score	To par	Margin of victory	Runner(s)-up	Winner's share (€)
Deutsche Bank Players Championship of Europe
2007	(Argentina) Andrés Romero	269	−19	3 strokes	(Denmark) Søren Hansen (England) Oliver Wilson	600,000
2006	(Sweden) Robert Karlsson	263	−25	4 strokes	(South Africa) Charl Schwartzel (England) Lee Westwood	600,000
2005	(Sweden) Niclas Fasth	274	−14	Playoff	(Argentina) Ángel Cabrera	550,000
Deutsche Bank - SAP Open TPC of Europe
2004	(South Africa) Trevor Immelman	271	−17	1 stroke	(Republic of Ireland) Pádraig Harrington	500,000
2003	(Republic of Ireland) Pádraig Harrington	269	−19	Playoff	(Denmark) Thomas Bjørn	450,000
2002	(United States) Tiger Woods (3)	268	−20	Playoff	(Scotland) Colin Montgomerie	450,000
2001	(United States) Tiger Woods (2)	270	−18	4 strokes	(New Zealand) Michael Campbell	450,000
2000	(England) Lee Westwood (2)	273	−15	3 strokes	(Italy) Emanuele Canonica	450,000
1999	(United States) Tiger Woods	273	−15	3 strokes	(South Africa) Retief Goosen	280,000
1998	(England) Lee Westwood	265	−23	1 stroke	(Northern Ireland) Darren Clarke	256,676
Deutsche Bank Open TPC of Europe
1997	(England) Ross McFarlane	282	−6	1 stroke	(Scotland) Gordon Brand Jnr (Sweden) Anders Forsbrand	175,000
1996	(New Zealand) Frank Nobilo	270	−18	1 stroke	(Scotland) Colin Montgomerie	169,162
1995	(Germany) Bernhard Langer (2)	270	−18	6 strokes	(England) Jamie Spence	151,662
Honda Open
1994	(Australia) Robert Allenby	276	−12	Playoff	(Spain) Miguel Ángel Jiménez	116,662
1993	(Scotland) Sam Torrance	278	−10	Playoff	(England) Paul Broadhurst (Sweden) Johan Ryström (Wales) Ian Woosnam	116,662
1992	(Germany) Bernhard Langer	273	−15	3 strokes	(Northern Ireland) Darren Clarke	105,000
