= Turespaña Masters =

European Tour golf tournament

BBVA Open Turespaña Masters Comunidad de Madrid
Tournament information
- Location: Madrid, Spain
- Established: 1992
- Course: Club de Campo Villa de Madrid
- Par: 71
- Length: 6,957 yards (6,361 m)
- Tour: European Tour
- Format: Stroke play
- Prize fund: €1,000,000
- Month played: October
- Final year: 2000

Tournament record score
- Aggregate: 264 Miguel Ángel Jiménez (1999)
- To par: −24 as above

Final champion
- (Republic of Ireland) Pádraig Harrington
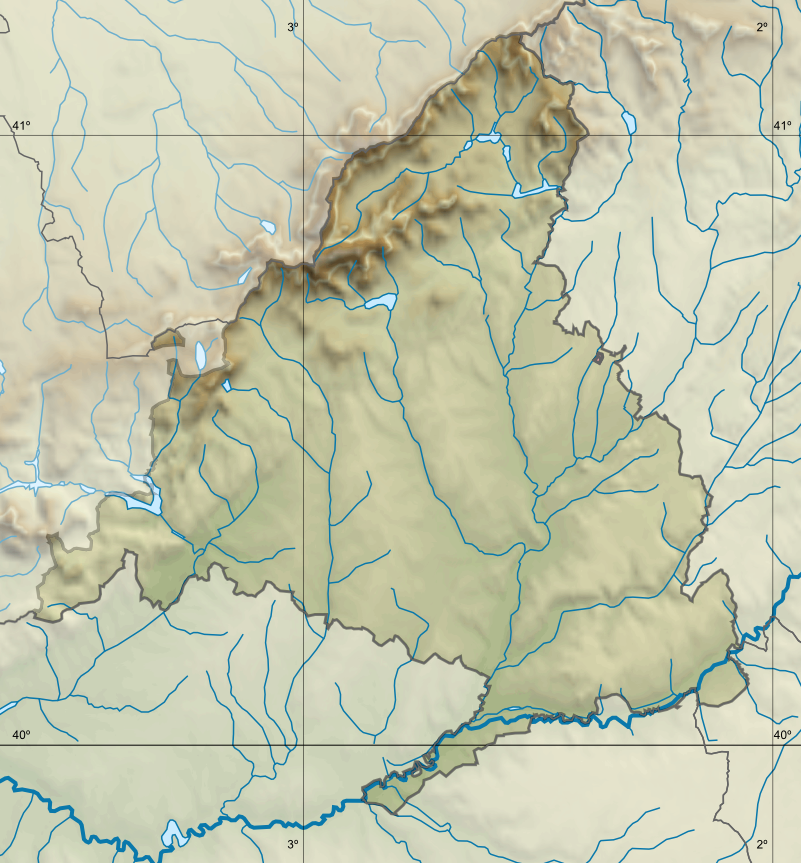
- Location in Spain Location in the Community of Madrid

The Turespaña Masters was a European Tour golf tournament which was played from 1992 to 2000 in several different regions of Spain. Turespaña is the Spanish national tourism authority, and it sponsored several golf tournaments in the 1980s and 1990s to promote Spain's role as a major warm weather golfing holiday destination in Europe. The winners of the Turespaña Masters included the major championship winners Vijay Singh and José María Olazábal. The prize fund fluctuated, but was generally below average for a European Tour event.

== Winners ==
Year	Winner	Score	To par	Margin of victory	Runner-up
BBVA Open Turespaña Masters Comunidad de Madrid
2000	(Republic of Ireland) Pádraig Harrington	267	−17	2 strokes	(Scotland) Gary Orr
Turespaña Masters - Open Andalucía
1999	(Spain) Miguel Ángel Jiménez (2)	264	−24	4 strokes	(England) Steve Webster
Turespaña Masters Open Baleares
1998	(Spain) Miguel Ángel Jiménez	281	−9	2 strokes	(Spain) Miguel Ángel Martín
Turespaña Masters Open de Canarias
1997	(Spain) José María Olazábal	272	−20	2 strokes	(England) Lee Westwood
Turespaña Masters
1996	(Spain) Diego Borrego	271	−17	Playoff	(Zimbabwe) Tony Johnstone
Turespaña Masters Open de Andalucía
1995	(Germany) Alex Čejka	278	−6	3 strokes	(Italy) Costantino Rocca
1994	(England) Carl Mason	278	−10	2 strokes	(Spain) José María Olazábal
1993	(Scotland) Andrew Oldcorn	285	−3	1 stroke	(Argentina) Eduardo Romero
1992	(Fiji) Vijay Singh	277	−11	2 strokes	(England) Gary Evans
