= Brazil São Paulo 500 Years Open =

Tournament information
- Location: São Paulo, Brazil
- Established: 2000
- Course: São Paulo Golf Club
- Par: 71
- Length: 6,646 yards (6,077 m)
- Tour: European Tour
- Format: Stroke play
- Prize fund: €750,000
- Month played: March
- Final year: 2001

Tournament record score
- Aggregate: 270 Pádraig Harrington (2000)
- To par: −14 as above

Final champion
- (South Africa) Darren Fichardt
- Location in Brazil

The Brazil São Paulo 500 Years Open was the second of two golf tournaments that were held in 2000 to commemorate the discovery of Brazil by Pedro Álvares Cabral in 1500. They were both included on the schedule of the European Tour, marking the tour's first visit to South America.

== History ==
The tournament was held at the São Paulo Golf Club. Unlike the Brazil Rio de Janeiro 500 Years Open, it was staged for a second time in 2001, when it was titled as the São Paulo Brazil Open.

The inaugural event was won by Ireland's Pádraig Harrington, who triumphed by two strokes over American Gerry Norquist. The following year, South African Darren Fichardt recorded a five stroke victory in an event reduced to 54 holes because of disruption caused by thunderstorms during each of the first three days.

== Winners ==
Year	Winner	Score	To par	Margin of victory	Runner(s)-up
São Paulo Brazil Open
2001	(South Africa) Darren Fichardt	195 (Note: Shortened to 54 holes due to rain.)	−18	5 strokes	(Argentina) José Cóceres (Sweden) Richard S. Johnson (Australia) Brett Rumford
Brazil São Paulo 500 Years Open
2000	(Republic of Ireland) Pádraig Harrington	270	−14	2 strokes	(United States) Gerry Norquist

== See also ==
- Brazil Open
