= Michael Bannon =

British golf coach

- Occupation: Golf coach

Michael Bannon is a golf coach from Northern Ireland. He is the current coach of the 2011 U.S. Open, 2012 and 2014 PGA Championship, 2014 Open Championship, and 2025 and 2026 Masters Tournament champion Rory McIlroy, and worked with him from a young age. Bannon was the golf professional at Bangor Golf Club, and previously at Holywood Golf Club, where he worked with McIlroy. As a golfer, Bannon competed in the 1997 Irish PGA Championship. Michael Bannon left his job at Bangor Golf Club to work full-time for world number one Rory McIlroy in October 2012.
