= 1999 European Tour =

Golf tour season

1999 European Tour season
- Duration: 14 January 1999 – 7 November 1999
- Number of official events: 41
- Most wins: (Scotland) Colin Montgomerie (5)
- Order of Merit: (Scotland) Colin Montgomerie
- Golfer of the Year: (Scotland) Colin Montgomerie
- Sir Henry Cotton Rookie of the Year: (Spain) Sergio García

The 1999 European Tour, titled as the 1999 PGA European Tour, was the 28th season of the European Tour, the main professional golf tour in Europe since its inaugural season in 1972.

== Changes for 1999 ==
There were many changes from the previous season, with the addition of three new World Golf Championships, the Asian PGA Tour co-sanctioned Benson & Hedges Malaysian Open, the Estoril Open, the West of Ireland Golf Classic (also a Challenge Tour event), and the Scottish PGA Championship; and the loss of the Johnnie Walker Classic due to rescheduling from January to November, as well as the Cannes Open. The Open Novotel Perrier was also lost from the schedule as sponsors switched to support the Open de France; the Sarazen World Open, which had been discontinued as a result of the creation of the WGCs, was revived as a full tour event and took the dates on the calendar opposite the Cisco World Match Play Championship.

== Schedule ==
The following table lists official events during the 1999 season.

Date	Tournament	Host country	Purse	Winner (Note: The number in brackets after each winner's name is the number of European Tour events they had won up to and including that tournament. This information is only shown for European Tour members and are inclusive of the three United States-based major championships which were included on the schedule for the first time in 1998, with earlier editions having retrospectively been recognised as official tour wins.)	OWGR points	Other tours (Note: AFR − Southern Africa Tour; ANZ − PGA Tour of Australasia; ASA − Asian PGA Tour; CHA − Challenge Tour.)	Notes
17 Jan	Alfred Dunhill South African PGA Championship	South Africa	£400,000	(South Africa) Ernie Els (7)	24	AFR	
24 Jan	Mercedes-Benz - Vodacom South African Open	South Africa	US$1,000,000	(South Africa) David Frost (2)	34	AFR (Note: Southern Africa Tour flagship event)	
31 Jan	Heineken Classic	Australia	A$800,000	(Australia) Jarrod Moseley (1)	30	ANZ	
7 Feb	Benson & Hedges Malaysian Open	Malaysia	US$750,000	(United States) Gerry Norquist (1)	24	ASA	New to European Tour
14 Feb	Dubai Desert Classic	UAE	US$1,300,000	(England) David Howell (1)	42		
20 Feb	Qatar Masters	Qatar	US$1,000,000	(Scotland) Paul Lawrie (2)	24		
28 Feb	WGC-Andersen Consulting Match Play Championship	United States	US$5,000,000	(United States) Jeff Maggert (n/a)	76		New tournament World Golf Championship
7 Mar	Algarve Portuguese Open	Portugal	€550,000	(England) Van Phillips (1)	24		
14 Mar	Turespaña Masters - Open Andalucía	Spain	€500,000	(Spain) Miguel Ángel Jiménez (5)	24		
28 Mar	Madeira Island Open	Portugal	€500,000	(Spain) Pedro Linhart (1)	24		
11 Apr	Masters Tournament	United States	US$4,000,000	(Spain) José María Olazábal (19)	100		Major championship (Note: Unofficial money event at the time, but retrospectively counted as an official win.)
18 Apr	Estoril Open	Portugal	€550,000	(France) Jean-François Remésy (1)	24		New tournament
25 Apr	Peugeot Open de España	Spain	€850,000	(Sweden) Jarmo Sandelin (3)	26		
2 May	Fiat and Fila Italian Open	Italy	€1,000,000	(Scotland) Dean Robertson (1)	28		
9 May	Novotel Perrier Open de France	France	€850,000	(South Africa) Retief Goosen (3)	24		
16 May	Benson & Hedges International Open	England	£750,000	(Scotland) Colin Montgomerie (18)	38		
24 May	Deutsche Bank - SAP Open TPC of Europe	Germany	€1,700,000	(United States) Tiger Woods (n/a)	50		
31 May	Volvo PGA Championship	England	€1,800,000	(Scotland) Colin Montgomerie (19)	64		Flagship event
6 Jun	Compass Group English Open	England	£600,000	(Northern Ireland) Darren Clarke (5)	30		
13 Jun	German Open	Germany	€1,000,000	(Sweden) Jarmo Sandelin (4)	24		
20 Jun	Moroccan Open	Morocco	€500,000	(Spain) Miguel Ángel Martín (3)	24		
20 Jun	U.S. Open	United States	US$3,500,000	(United States) Payne Stewart (n/a)	100		Major championship
27 Jun	Compaq European Grand Prix	England	€900,000	(Wales) David Park (1)	26		
4 Jul	Murphy's Irish Open	Ireland	€1,400,000	(Spain) Sergio García (1)	36		
11 Jul	Standard Life Loch Lomond	Scotland	£1,000,000	(Scotland) Colin Montgomerie (20)	46		
18 Jul	The Open Championship	Scotland	£2,000,000	(Scotland) Paul Lawrie (3)	100		Major championship
25 Jul	TNT Dutch Open	Netherlands	€1,100,000	(England) Lee Westwood (7)	32		
2 Aug	Smurfit European Open	Ireland	£1,200,000	(England) Lee Westwood (8)	42		
8 Aug	Volvo Scandinavian Masters	Sweden	€1,400,000	(Scotland) Colin Montgomerie (21)	28		
15 Aug	West of Ireland Golf Classic	Ireland	€350,000	(Italy) Costantino Rocca (5)	24	CHA	New tournament
15 Aug	PGA Championship	United States	US$3,500,000	(United States) Tiger Woods (n/a)	100		Major championship
22 Aug	BMW International Open	Germany	€1,200,000	(Scotland) Colin Montgomerie (22)	26		
29 Aug	WGC-NEC Invitational	United States	US$5,000,000	(United States) Tiger Woods (n/a)	68		New tournament World Golf Championship
30 Aug	Scottish PGA Championship	Scotland	€350,000	(England) Warren Bennett (1)	24		New tournament
5 Sep	Canon European Masters	Switzerland	€1,250,000	(England) Lee Westwood (9)	26		
12 Sep	Victor Chandler British Masters	England	£650,000	(United States) Bob May (1)	40		
19 Sep	Trophée Lancôme	France	€1,100,000	(Sweden) Pierre Fulke (1)	42		
3 Oct	Linde German Masters	Germany	€1,750,000	(Spain) Sergio García (2)	46		
17 Oct	Sarazen World Open	Spain	US$600,000	(Denmark) Thomas Bjørn (4)	24		New to European Tour
24 Oct	Belgacom Open	Belgium	€750,000	(Sweden) Robert Karlsson (3)	28		
31 Oct	Volvo Masters	Spain	€1,400,000	(Spain) Miguel Ángel Jiménez (6)	46		Tour Championship
7 Nov	WGC-American Express Championship	Spain	US$5,000,000	(United States) Tiger Woods (n/a)	70		New tournament World Golf Championship

=== Unofficial events ===
The following events were sanctioned by the European Tour, but did not carry official money, nor were wins official.

Date	Tournament	Host country	Purse	Winner(s)	OWGR points	Notes
27 Sep	Ryder Cup	United States	n/a	Team USA	n/a	Team event
10 Oct	Alfred Dunhill Cup	Scotland	£1,000,000	Team Spain	n/a	Team event
~~17 Oct~~	Open Novotel Perrier	France	–	Cancelled	–	Team event
17 Oct	Cisco World Match Play Championship	England	£500,000	(Scotland) Colin Montgomerie	34	Limited-field event
21 Nov	World Cup of Golf	Malaysia	US$1,300,000	(United States) Mark O'Meara and (United States) Tiger Woods	n/a	Team event
21 Nov	World Cup of Golf Individual Trophy	Malaysia	US$200,000	(United States) Tiger Woods	n/a	

== Order of Merit ==
The Order of Merit was titled as the Volvo Order of Merit and was based on prize money won during the season, calculated in Euros.

Position	Player	Prize money (€)
1	(Scotland) Colin Montgomerie	1,822,880
2	(England) Lee Westwood	1,320,804
3	(Spain) Sergio García	1,317,693
4	(Spain) Miguel Ángel Jiménez	1,148,289
5	(South Africa) Retief Goosen	1,059,984
6	(Scotland) Paul Lawrie	901,452
7	(Republic of Ireland) Pádraig Harrington	855,162
8	(Northern Ireland) Darren Clarke	731,290
9	(Sweden) Jarmo Sandelin	629,131
10	(Argentina) Ángel Cabrera	622,852

== Awards ==
Award	Winner	Ref.
Golfer of the Year	(Scotland) Colin Montgomerie	
Sir Henry Cotton Rookie of the Year	(Spain) Sergio García	

== See also ==
- 1999 European Seniors Tour
