= Estoril Open (golf) =

European Tour golf tournament in Portugal

Tournament information
- Location: Estoril, Cascais, Portugal
- Established: 1999
- Course: Penha Longa Resort
- Par: 72
- Length: 6,880 yards (6,290 m)
- Tour: European Tour
- Format: Stroke play
- Prize fund: €550,000
- Month played: April
- Final year: 1999

Tournament record score
- Aggregate: 286 Jean-François Remésy (1999)
- To par: −2 as above

Final champion
- (France) Jean-François Remésy
- Location in Portugal

The Estoril Open was a golf tournament on the European Tour in 1999. It was held at Penha Longa in Estoril, Portugal from 15 to 18 April. It was won by Jean-François Remésy who shot a 2-under-par total of 286, to finish as the only player under par.

The renewal of the Estoril Open in 2000 was cancelled due to sponsorship problems. The event was also included on the European Tour schedule in 2001, but was cancelled again.

== Winners ==
Year	Winner	Score	To par	Margin of victory	Runners-up
2001	Cancelled due to September 11 attacks				
2000	No tournament				
1999	(France) Jean-François Remésy	286	−2	2 strokes	(England) David Carter (Scotland) Andrew Coltart (Italy) Massimo Florioli
