= Sarazen World Open =

Tournament information
- Location: Girona, Spain
- Established: 1994
- Course: PGA Catalunya Resort
- Par: 72
- Length: 7,204 yards (6,587 m)
- Tour: European Tour
- Format: Stroke play
- Prize fund: US$600,000
- Month played: October
- Final year: 1999

Tournament record score
- Aggregate: 271 Mark Calcavecchia (1997)
- To par: −17 as above

Final champion
- (Denmark) Thomas Bjørn
- Location in Spain Location in Catalonia

The Sarazen World Open was a professional golf tournament, named in honor of seven-time major champion and hall of famer Gene Sarazen. It was held from 1994 to 1999. The field mostly consisted of national open winners from around the world from the previous two years. From 1996 to 1998, it was sponsored by Subaru and titled as the Subaru Sarazen World Open.

The Sarazen World Open was an unofficial event on the PGA Tour and for the first five years was also an approved special event on European Tour; in its final year it became an official Order of Merit event on the European Tour. It was played at Chateau Elan (Legends course) in Braselton, Georgia until 1999, when it was held at PGA Catalunya in Barcelona, Spain.

== Winners ==
Year	Tour (Note: EUR − European Tour.)	Winner	Score	To par	Margin of victory	Runner(s)-up	Purse (US$)	Winner's share ($)
Sarazen World Open
1999	EUR	(Denmark) Thomas Bjørn	273	−15	2 strokes	(Switzerland) Paolo Quirici (Japan) Katsuyoshi Tomori	600,000	100,000
Subaru Sarazen World Open
1998		(United States) Dudley Hart	272	−16	4 strokes	(United States) Bob Tway	2,000,000	360,000
1997		(United States) Mark Calcavecchia	271	−17	3 strokes	(England) Lee Westwood	2,000,000	360,000
1996		(New Zealand) Frank Nobilo (2)	272	−16	4 strokes	(United States) Scott Hoch	1,900,000	342,000
Sarazen World Open
1995		(New Zealand) Frank Nobilo	216 (Note: Shortened to 54 holes due to weather.)	−8	1 stroke	(Spain) Miguel Ángel Jiménez (Zimbabwe) Mark McNulty	1,900,000	350,000
1994		(South Africa) Ernie Els	273	−15	3 strokes	(United States) Fred Funk	1,900,000	350,000
