= J. P. McManus Pro-Am =

Golf tournament

Tournament information
- Location: Adare, County Limerick, Ireland
- Established: 1990
- Course: Adare Manor
- Par: 72
- Length: 7,452 yards (6,814 m)
- Organised by: J. P. McManus
- Tour: European Tour (unofficial event)
- Format: Stroke play
- Prize fund: £1,000,000
- Month played: July

Tournament record score
- Aggregate: 130 Pádraig Harrington (2005)
- To par: −14 as above

Current champion
- (United States) Xander Schauffele

Location map
- Location in Ireland

The J. P. McManus Pro-Am is a Pro-Am golf tournament created and hosted by J. P. McManus. It is currently played at Adare Manor in County Limerick, also host to the 2027 Ryder Cup. It has been staged six times spanning between 1990 and 2022. The tournament is designed to raise money for local charities.

== History ==
=== 1990 ===
The inaugural event was held on 5 and 6 July 1990 at Limerick Golf Club and included notable Ryder Cup players such as Gordon Brand Jnr, Eamonn Darcy and Des Smyth. Roger Chapman and Neil Hansen tied with scores of 141.

=== 1995 ===
The second staging of the event was held on 5 and 6 June 1995, again at Limerick GC. It was also the first time that the European Tour became involved with the management of the event, increasing the attraction of profiles in attendance. Richard Boxall and Paul Broadhurst shared the trophy with scores of 134, winning £7,500 each.

=== 2000 ===
The 2000 event was held for the third time at Limerick Golf Club on 10 and 11 July. It gained more attraction as then World Number One Tiger Woods committed to play in the event. He went on to win by six shots ahead of Malcolm MacKenzie. Many famous amateur golfers took part as well including Alex Ferguson, Eddie Jordan and Gary Lineker.

=== 2005 ===
In 2005 the event moved to its current home at Adare Manor, a resort located in County Limerick owned by McManus. The event included a high-quality field, being headlined again by defending champion Tiger Woods. Pádraig Harrington took home the title, scoring a tournament record of 14-under-par, winning by six shots ahead of Tim Clark.

=== 2010 ===
The 2010 event was again hosted at Adare Manor with another high-quality field; both professionals and amateurs. Darren Clarke won by one shot over Luke Donald.

=== 2022 ===
Originally scheduled to be played in July 2020, the event was postponed due to the COVID-19 pandemic. It was rescheduled for 2021 and then postponed again to July 2022. The 2022 event attracted the strongest field in its history. Xander Schauffele won the event by one shot ahead of Sam Burns.

== Winners ==
| Year | Winner | Score | To par | Margin of victory | Runner-up |
|---|---|---|---|---|---|
| 2022 | (United States) Xander Schauffele | 134 | −10 | 1 stroke | (United States) Sam Burns |
| 2010 | (Northern Ireland) Darren Clarke | 141 | −3 | 1 stroke | (England) Luke Donald |
| 2005 | (Republic of Ireland) Pádraig Harrington | 130 | −14 | 6 strokes | (South Africa) Tim Clark |
| 2000 | (United States) Tiger Woods | 132 | −12 | 6 strokes | (England) Malcolm MacKenzie |
| 1995 | (England) Richard Boxall (England) Paul Broadhurst | 134 | −10 | Title shared | |
| 1990 | (England) Roger Chapman (England) Neil Hansen | 141 | −3 | Title shared | |
