= Brazil Rio de Janeiro 500 Years Open =

Tournament information
- Location: Rio de Janeiro, Brazil
- Established: 2000
- Course: Itanhangá Golf Club
- Par: 72
- Length: 6,618 yards (6,051 m)
- Tour: European Tour
- Format: Stroke play
- Prize fund: €675,000
- Month played: March
- Final year: 2000

Tournament record score
- Aggregate: 270 Roger Chapman (2000); 270 Pádraig Harrington (2000)
- To par: −18 as above

Final champion
- (England) Roger Chapman
- Location in Brazil

The Brazil Rio de Janeiro 500 Years Open was the first of two golf tournaments that were held in 2000 to commemorate the discovery of Brazil by Pedro Álvares Cabral in 1500. They were both included on the schedule of the European Tour, marking the tour's first visit to South America.

The tournament was held at Itanhangá Golf Club in Rio de Janeiro and won by England's Roger Chapman who triumphed in a sudden-death playoff over Ireland's Pádraig Harrington, who won the second tournament in São Paulo the following week.

== Winners ==
Year	Winner	Score	To par	Margin of victory	Runner-up
2000	(England) Roger Chapman	270	−18	Playoff	(Republic of Ireland) Pádraig Harrington

== See also ==
- Brazil São Paulo 500 Years Open
- Brazil Open
