= Mike Cahill (golfer) =

Australian golfer

Personal information
- Full name: Michael F. Cahill
- Nationality: Australia
- Born: 10 December 1951 (age 74)

Career
- Sport: Golf
- Turned professional: 1973
- Former tours: PGA Tour of Australasia; European Tour
- Professional wins: 9

Number of wins by tour
- PGA Tour of Australasia: 3
- Other: 6

Best results in major championships
- Masters Tournament: DNP
- PGA Championship: DNP
- U.S. Open: DNP
- The Open Championship: T11: 1978

Michael F. Cahill (born 10 December 1951) is an Australian professional golfer. In 1971, Cahill had one of the best years in the history of Victorian amateur golf, becoming the first player to win the Victorian Junior Amateur and Victorian Senior Amateur in the same year. Shortly thereafter, Cahill turned pro and quickly had success, winning the 1977 Australian PGA Championship. In the ensuing years, however, citing personal problems and "poor practice habits," Cahill's game declined. In 1980, however, Cahill renewed his relationship with former mentor Kevin Hartley and his game improved, culminating with a three wins in Western Australia in May 1982. Later in the decade, Cahill started working as a club professional, a job he continues to perform.

== Early life ==
Cahill is from Altona, Victoria, a suburb of Melbourne, Australia. His father, Frank Cahill, was a "famous" Australian rules football player.

Cahill later stated that he wanted to be a professional golfer since the age of 14. He modeled his swing after Bruce Devlin. He left school the following year to turn pro. However, he couldn't find a job as an assistant professional so he returned to school. At the age of 15, the professional Geoff Parslow began to instruct him on his golf swing. Leading amateur Kevin Hartley also served as a mentor. During his youth, Cahill was also a member of Yarra Yarra Golf Club. Cahill won the club championship at Yarra Yarra "multiple times" as a teenager.

In the late 1960s, Cahill graduated from Altona High School and started attending Footscray Technical College as an accounting major.

== Amateur career ==
In 1969, Cahill first achieved significant media attention for his golf at the Victorian Amateur Championship. He reached the semifinals where he played his mentor Kevin Hartley. Cahill was "soundly beaten" by Hartley, 4 & 3. However, Hartley was in admiration of Cahill's skills, stating after the match he "learnt a few things" from his competitor. The following year, Cahill earned rights to play for Victoria's team at the Australian Junior Interstate Team Matches. Cahill helped his team win the event. He also won the Kooringal Golf Club's club championship in 1970.

In 1971, Cahill had one of the best years in the history of Victorian amateur golf. In February, he played the two-round Victoria Junior Open Golf Championship. In the final round, he shot a 69, tying for the round of the tournament, to win by four strokes. In September, he played the Victorian Amateur Championship again. It was held at his home course, Yarra Yarra Golf Club. Cahill reached the finals where he faced Ken Kilburn. Cahill defeated Kilburn 4 & 3. After the match Kilburn stated, "Cahill has the ability and the potential to do anything in golf. He has more potential than any other player I have seen in my career in amateur golf." In November, he played the two-round Champion of Champions at Commonwealth Golf Club. In the middle of the second round Cahill "virtually clinched" the title with three consecutive birdies. He won by four strokes. Peg McMahon of The Age stated, "Cahill's phenomenal run of success is a record for Victorian golf." It was the first time anyone in a singular year had won the Victorian Junior, Victorian Amateur, and Champion of Champions.

Cahill continued to have success at amateur golf through the early 1970s. In February 1972, Cahill played the Victorian Junior Golf Championship in defense of his championship. He finished in fourth place, two back. In June, he played the Victorian Senior Amateur again. It was held at Kingston Heath Golf Club. In the semifinals, he played Bill Britten. Cahill won on the 36th hole, 1 up. In the finals he was scheduled to play Ray Jenner. Cahill won easily, 8 & 7. "I never really had a chance," Jenner said after the match. "He's in another class." After the event, Peter Stone of The Age wrote, "Potentially, Cahill could become one of Australia's great golfers." In late June, he was selected to represent Australia at the 1972 Eisenhower Trophy. The team finished in second place to the United States.

In June 1973, Cahill returned to defend his Victorian Amateur Championship title. He reached the finals where he faced Ray Jenner again. Cahill defeated Jenner 3 & 2. After the event, Jack Lovett, president of the Victorian Golf Association said to Cahill, "You have joined the immortals of Victorian golf."

== Professional career ==
In late 1973, Cahill started working as an assistant professional. In December, he played one of his first tournaments as a pro at the Assistant Professional Championship. He finished in a tie for sixth. In May 1974, he played the Rothman's $1,000 at Shepparton. Cahill shot 74 to tie for the win with Rob McNaughton. However, because Cahill was still a "probationary professional" he was not allowed to earn money. A month later he played the Yarrawonga and Border Open for the first time. Cahill "was the only player able to handle the high wind" and won by seven strokes. In late July, Cahill tied for the win at the Hanimex-Kooringal purse. However, he was still not eligible to earn prize money. On August 1, he became eligible to earn prize money. In mid-August, he played the Mobil $1,000 pro-am tournament. Cahill scored an eagle at the par-5 final hole to punctuate a five-shot win. During this era, Cahill worked as an assistant pro at Yarra Yarra Golf Club for Geoff Parslow.

In 1975, the golfer Norman Von Nida began to serve as a mentor and supported Cahill's career. In March, based exclusively on a recommendation from von Nida, Cahill traveled to Europe to play on the European Tour. During his first three months in Europe, Cahill did not have much success; his only earnings were 120 pounds at the Madrid Open and he needed government assistance to get by. Despite these difficulties, in July, Cahill qualified for and made the cut at the 1975 Open Championship. However, in general it was a disappointing tour of Europe. Cahill made the cut in only three of eight events and finished 138th on the Order of Merit. As of September, he had returned to Australia. He had much more success in his home country. Late in the month, he played the Queensland Open. In the third round, Cahill "burst... into contention" with a two-under-par 68. He was in solo second, one back of Mike Ferguson. Cahill played poorly in the final round but still secured solo third. The following week he played the West Lakes Classic. On Sunday, Cahill made three birdies and an eagle on the back nine to record a 67 (−4) and take the clubhouse lead. He ultimately entered a sudden-death playoff with Bob Shearer. On the second playoff hole "Cahill almost won it" but Shearer managed to go up and down from off the green. On the third playoff hole Cahill hit his approach well over the green assuring bogey. Shearer's "safe par" won the event. Terry Smith, the golf journalist for The Sydney Morning Herald, referred to Cahill as the "new Bruce Devlin", while Peter Thomson said Cahill was "a new star."

The remainder of the mid-1970s were not as successful, however. In January 1976, Cahill played the Australian PGA Championship at Rosebud Country Club. He opened with a four-under-par 68 to break the course record, sharing the lead with Bill Dunk. However, he was "disqualified" in the second round. The Australian PGA stated that Cahill was "ineligible" because he had not played for three full years as a "trainee professional." Cahill was not happy with the decision and "left the course in disgust." As of April, he returned to play on the European Tour. In the middle of the European season, he attempted to qualify for the 1976 Open Championship. During the first qualifying round, he was playing directly behind crane operator Maurice Flitcroft, who had never played golf before. Flitcroft ended up shooting an extremely high score, delaying groups behind him. This personally frustrated Cahill. "I just snapped at the 12th and accosted him," he later said. "I yelled at him that this wasn't a circus and told him to get off the course." Cahill ultimately "missed qualifying for the Open by heaps." Overall, Cahill did not have much success in Europe, recording only one top-25 and finishing outside the top 100 of the Order of Merit once again. Cahill shortly returned to Australia. He recorded a few highlights, finishing joint third at the Queensland Open and solo second at the Tasmanian Open. He also won the Victorian Close Championship during the season, a minor event.

As of April 1977, he was playing on the European Tour again. His poor play returned. During the European year, Cahill made the cut in the majority of his events but did not produce many high finishes, only recording one top-25. He finished well back on the Order of Merit again, in 85th place. Around this era, he was thinking about quitting golf. He later said, "I thought of throwing the clubs away for a while and doing something else... driving a cab or anything at all to make money." However, his former supervisor at Yarra Yarra, Geoff Parslow, encouraged him to keep going. Parslow spent a week with Cahill on the practice range "ironing out the blemishes in his swing."

In November 1977, Cahill played the Telecom Australian PGA Championship played at Yarra Yarra Golf Club, his home course. Cahill opened with rounds of 69 and 70 to put him one back of the lead after each round. In the third round he "played confidently," shooting a 32 on the front nine to take the solo lead. In the final round, Cahill started poorly with a bogey on the first hole. However, his primary competitors, Mike Ferguson and Bob Byman, self-imploded during the middle of the front nine, with several over-par holes. Cahill, meanwhile, steadied, shooting a par-36 for the front nine to put himself in "a comfortable position." Though Jack Newton and Graham Marsh "made brief rallies" there "was no great pressure on" Cahill. With a final round 70, Cahill finished at 278 (−10) and defeated Ferguson, the solo runner-up, by four strokes. Cahill won A$22,000 for his win, roughly $20,000 greater than his previous highest cheque as a golfer. It was "his first major professional victory." The win put him near the lead on the PGA Tour of Australia's Order of Merit. In addition, it also helped him earn membership for Australia's 1977 World Cup team. Due to the success, Trevor Grant of The Age wrote that Cahill was "the young Australian most likely to make the biggest impact on the international scene."

In early 1978, Cahill had a number of high finishes across the world. In January, he recorded a top five at the Caltex Festival of Sydney Open. In February, he played the Tasmanian Open. Cahill was just a shot off the lead after three rounds. He played poorly in the final round though still finished in the top ten. In March, he played the Thailand Open. In the third round, he shot a 65 (−7) to break the course record move into joint second, one off the lead. Cahill again faltered in the final round though still easily finished in the top ten. Unlike previous years, Cahill did not play on the European Tour. However, in July he did go to Scotland in an attempt to qualify for the 1978 Open Championship. Cahill was successful at the two-round qualifier. Cahill opened with rounds of 71 and 72 to make the cut. In the final round, Cahill made "one of the strongest finishes" of the tournament with six birdies to record a four-under-par 68. He finished at 286 (−2) and in a tie for 11th place. Cahill later said, "That 68 was probably my finest round." He was the second highest Australian in the field.

As of September 1978, Cahill had returned to Australia. Late in the month, he began play at the Golden Gate Classic at Coolangatta & Tweed Heads Golf Club. In the second round he shot a 65 (−7), breaking the course record and tying his lowest round as a professional. It put him in contention, three back of leader Vaughan Somers. Cahill stayed in contention for the remainder of the tournament and on the 72nd hole "sank a long putt" to enter a playoff with Somers. The first four holes were halved. The playoff was suspended to the following day due to "darkness." The following day, Somers and Cahill had short putts to win on the first two playoff holes, respectively, but each missed. However, on the third playoff hole of the day − and seventh overall − Cahill "made no mistake" making a short birdie putt for the victory. The following week Cahill was again in contention to win at the Joe Jansen New South Wales PGA Championship. On the final hole, similar to the previous week, Cahill made a "splendid" 30-foot birdie putt to enter a sudden-death playoff. His competitors were Ted Ball and John Clifford. At the first hole of the playoff, both Cahill and Ball barely missed birdie putts while Clifford hit his putt "straight and true" for the win. In late October, Cahill was in contention again at the West Lakes Classic. In the third round, he shot a 68 (–3), the day's second lowest round, to move into solo third. He struggled in the final day though still finished in the top ten. He later referred to 1978 as his best season. He told The Age, referring to the year, "I was on top of the world and couldn't do a thing wrong."

Cahill spent the next two years "in the golfing wilderness," however. Cahill later stated that he did not "practice enough" leading to weak play. He later said, "For about three years I wasn't practising and was drinking too much. I just had no ambition to do anything in golf." During this era, Cahill did not earn a cheque greater than A$1,200. Early in the 1980–81 season, however, Cahill stated that he was "beginning to come back." He had recently taken advice from "old confidant" Kevin Hartley. His comeback began in November 1980 at the Victorian PGA Championship at Rosebud Country Club. An "[i]n-[f]orm" Cahill opened with a 67 to take the lead and break the course record. Cahill led for most of the remainder of the tournament and finished solo second, one back. In August 1981, Cahill won the two-round Barham Open by one over Ian Stanley and Terry Gilmore. It was his first win in three years. Later in the season, he recorded top fives at the Queensland Open and Air New Zealand Shell Open.

In 1982, according to The Sydney Morning Herald, Cahill had "his most consistent year" since he turned pro. Early in the year, in February, Cahill closed with a 67 (–5) at the Tasmanian Open to finish joint second, one back. In May, he went on a great winning streak in Western Australia. Early in the month, he played the 36-hole Royal Fremantle Open and won the event. The following week, Cahill played the Halls Head Western Open. He opened with three under-par rounds to get near the lead. In the final round, Cahill was two-under-par for the day entering the 18th hole and tied for the lead. On the final hole, Cahill "badly pulled" his drive but it fortuitously hit a car and bounced into the middle of the fairway. This facilitated par and he took the clubhouse lead. Meanwhile, the joint leader, Terry Gale, had a "shocking" 18th hole, hitting his drive into a grove of trees and his approach onto another hole. He made bogey assuring Cahill's win. It was Cahill's first 72-hole win in four years.

The following week, at the CIG−Channel 9 Nedlands Masters, Cahill was again in contention at the final hole, tied with John Clifford this time. Both made "solid pars" to move into a sudden-death playoff. On the first playoff hole, played on the 271-metre, par-4 1st hole, Cahill drove the green to assure birdie. Clifford played the hole "safely" and only made par. Cahill won the event. He earned A$7,200. It was his third win in four events. Cahill had now earned A$16,500 for his recent winning streak in Western Australia. He moved to 4th place on the PGA Tour of Australia money list. In July, he attempted to qualify for the 1982 Open Championship. At the two-round qualifier, Cahill recorded two rounds in the 60s to earn entry into the event. Cahill made the cut in the tournament and finished in solo 60th place. Overall, during his European season, he made the cut in four of his five tournaments. Shortly thereafter, he returned to Australia. Cahill recorded top tens at the Resch's Pilsner Tweed Classic and Victorian PGA Championship. Due to his good play over the course of the year, Cahill was invited to represent Australia at the World Cup again. At the 1982 World Cup he paired with Mike Clayton. The team finished in 13th place.

For the remainder of his career, however, Cahill was unable to match this high performance. Cahill later said of this late stage of his career that he was merely "hanging in there," vacillating from, in his words, "playing good at times and playing bad at times." In 1984, he played on the European Tour for the final time. Cahill did not play particularly well, making the cut in only four of eleven tournaments with no top-25s. He finished #205 on the Order of Merit. Late in the year, he told John Hourigan of The Canberra Times that there was simply "nothing to report" about his experience in Europe. He stated that poor putting was causing him problems during this era.

In 1985, Cahill's play got worse and he later referred to it as a "terrible year." Cahill often played well at pro-ams only to play poorly in the tournament proper. In February, he played the Australian Masters. At the pro-am, he shot a 72 to finish in a tie for fifth with Bernhard Langer and Greg Norman, three back. At the tournament proper, however, he opened with a 78 and was never in contention. In October, Cahill played the Queensland Open. At the tournament's warm-up he shot a 66 to finish joint second, one back of Langer. At the four-round event, however, he shot rounds of 72 and 77 to start way back. In November, he played the Australian Open at Royal Melbourne Golf Club. At the pro-am, Cahill shot a 71 at the "demanding composite course" to tie Tom Watson for medalist honors. However, he missed the cut in the tournament proper. The following week, at the U-Bix Classic, Cahill again played well at the pro-am, shooting a 66 to finish joint second, one back of Stewart Ginn. In the first round, Cahill opened well, shooting a 66 (–7) to tie the lead. However, he faded with rounds of 74 and 75. For the remainder of the decade, Cahill continued to struggle, only recording a couple top-tens in minor events.

For the remainder of his career, Cahill has worked as a club pro across Australia. In the late 1980s, he began working at Eagle Ridge Golf Club in Rosebud, Victoria. In the 2000s, he moved on to Tumut Golf Course in Tumut, New South Wales. More recently, he has worked at Whaleback Golf Course at Parkwood, Western Australia.

== Personal life ==
In the 1970s, Cahill married Julie. As of 1980, however, they were divorced.

In April 1982, Cahill's father went into the hospital. He died two months later.

== Amateur wins ==
- 1971 Leongatha Open Amateur Championship, Victoria Junior Open Golf Championship, Victorian Amateur Championship, Champion of Champions
- 1972 Victorian Amateur Championship
- 1973 Victorian Amateur Championship

== Professional wins (9) ==
=== PGA Tour of Australia wins (3) ===
- 1977 Telecom Australian PGA Championship
- 1978 Golden Gate Classic
- 1982 Halls Head Western Open

=== Other wins (6) ===
- 1974 Yarrawonga and Border Open
- 1976 Victorian Close Championship
- 1981 Barham Open
- 1982 Royal Fremantle Open, CIG−Channel 9 Nedlands Masters
- 1985 Murray River Classic

== Results in major championships ==
Tournament	1975	1976	1977	1978	1979	1980	1981	1982	1982	1983	1984	1985	1986
The Open Championship	T32			T11	CUT			60				T25	CUT

Note: Cahill only played in The Open Championship.

Did not play

CUT = missed the half-way cut (3rd round cut in 1979 Open Championship)
"T" indicates a tie for a place

== Team appearances ==
Amateur

- Australian Junior Interstate Team Matches (representing Victoria): 1970 (winners), 1971
- Eisenhower Trophy (representing Australia): 1972

Professional

- World Cup (representing Australia): 1977, 1982
