= George Serhan =

Australian professional golfer (born 1954)

Personal information
- Nationality: Australia
- Born: 30 June 1954 (age 72) Muswellbrook, New South Wales, Australia

Career
- Sport: Golf
- Turned professional: 1971
- Former tour: PGA Tour of Australia
- Professional wins: 5

Number of wins by tour
- PGA Tour of Australasia: 1
- Other: 4

George Serhan (born 30 June 1954) is an Australian professional golfer. Serhan was a full-time pro on the PGA Tour of Australasia from the mid-1970s through the mid-1990s. Although he won a number of minor tournaments in the Australasian region he is best remembered for winning his home state's open, the New South Wales Open, in 1980. It was his only official win on the PGA Tour of Australasia.

== Early life ==
Serhan is from Muswellbrook, New South Wales. He is of Lebanese descent. In 1971, in an effort to be a professional golfer, Serhan moved to Sydney. He trained at the nearby Roseville Golf Club.

== Professional career ==
Serhan played his first pro tournament at the 1973 Forbes tournament. He started playing the Australian circuit full-time during 1974–75 season.

Serhan first achieved notable press coverage with his first round play at the 1975 New South Wales Open. He had an excellent back nine starting with a birdie on the 10th and then a holed bunker shot on the 13th. This was followed by three consecutive birdies. It was considered an even more "astonishing effort" as he was coming off a triple bogey on the par-3 8th hole. Overall, Serhan had 10 birdies and shot a 65 (−7) to take a one shot lead over Tony Gresham. However, he fell back significantly with a second round 77. The following year, Serhan again took the first round lead at another tournament, the Ben Guzzardi – Total Golf Classic, but again faded in the second round, which was also the final round. At the February 1977 Tasmanian Open, he was the "early pacemaker" and only one back after the third round. However, he again "collapsed" with a chance to win, making a triple bogey on the par-3 8th hole and shooting a final round 77 (+6).

A month later, Serhan played excellently at the March 1977 Queanbeyan City Open. He birdied four holes during the first round's front nine for a 33 (−2) and then birdied the final four holes of the day for a 64 (−6), the course record. He fell back slightly with a second round 72, three back of Barry Burgess. However, he got back into contention with a third round 69 to tie Greg Norman for second place. In the final round he birdied the 5th and 6th holes to get very close to the lead. However, "bad pitching" on the back nine ended hopes of a comeback. He finished in solo third place, five shots back of Burgess. Later in the year, in August, he won the Fiji Open. It was his first professional win. Two years later, he won another event in the Oceania region, the Samoan Open. In addition, as of 1978 Serhan was playing events on the Asia Golf Circuit. He would be a fixture on the circuit for the remainder of his regular career.

In early September 1977, he won the Springwood Pro-Am and Henri Winterman's Rugby League pro-am in back-to-back days. He noted later in his career that he was the "winner of 100 Australian pro-ams."

In 1979 and 1980, he would arguably be at the peak of his game. In February 1979, despite a second round 79, he finished in a tie for fourth at the Philippine Masters. The following month he played well again in Asia, finishing in a tie for seventh at the Malaysian Open. In September 1979, he played well at the New South Wales PGA Championship, maintaining joint second place after the first two rounds. He eventually finished in a tie for third place. Two weeks later he had the round of the day during the third round of the Illawarra Open. He finished at 290 (+2), two back, in a tie for fourth. Overall, 1979 would be his hitherto "best tournament year" and he earned A$20,000. On 24 October 1980, he took the solo lead after the first round of the West Lakes Classic. He finished the event in 8th place.

The following week, he finally won on the PGA Tour of Australia at the New South Wales Open. He opened 70−68 to place himself one back of New Zealand's Bob Charles. On Saturday, with an eagle on the 17th hole, he took a two shot lead into the final day. Aided by Serhan's bogeys on the 11th and 13th holes, however, Scotland's Sam Torrance got within two shots of the lead. Serhan, though, was "never really worried at any time" and with a birdie at the 71st hole clinched the win. He shot an even-par round of 71 and won by four over Torrance.

This excellent play helped Serhan qualify for Australia's 1980 World Cup team. The 1980 World Cup was played in Bogotá, Colombia and Serhan's teammate was Bob Shaw. Unfortunately, Shaw became ill and had to withdraw from the tournament, resulting in that the Australia team was out of the competition. However, Serhan continued to play and completed the individual competition, finishing with 303 strokes, tied 32nd among 88 players.

In January 1981, Serhan won again. At the first round of the Illawarra Open, he shot a 69 (−3) to tie Bill Dunk and Ian Stanley for the lead. In the second and final round, it looked like Dunk would win but he finished double bogey – bogey to shoot 75 and finish at 144, two back. Serhan, meanwhile, shot a 73 as John Clifford and Gary Doolan came from behind to tie. On the first playoff hole, Serhan holed a five-metre putt to make par. Clifford had a chance to prolong the playoff but missed a two-metre putt. Serhan won the event. It was not an Order of Merit event on the PGA Tour of Australia.

From 1982 to 1985, Serhan produced a handful of highlights. He finished joint third at the 1982 Queensland Open. The following year he played in the Resch's Pilsner Tweed Classic. He opened 71−68 and was in joint second place at the midway point of the tournament. In the third round, he fired a 70 to place himself in joint 4th, three back of Terry Gale. He shot a final round 71 (−1) to remain in joint fourth. A year later, in December 1984, he shot a third round 70 (−2) at the Queensland PGA Championship to put himself in the top-10, within striking distance of the leaders. He finished in 4th place, four back of Ian Baker-Finch. The following year he finished in 6th place at the 1985 Australian Open, tied with Tom Watson and Mike Harwood.

The week after his high finish at the Australian Open he played the 1985 U-Bix Classic. Serhan shot a third round 67 (−6), tying the best of the day among the 66 competitors, putting himself in contention for the tournament. During the final round Serhan birdied four holes on the front nine and after leader Wayne Riley bogeyed the 9th the two were tied. The back nine was a back and forth affair between the two men. Riley regained the lead with a birdie on 10 but Serhan quickly responded with a birdie of his own on the next hole. After Serhan bogeyed the 12th, his competitor holed a 13-metre eagle putt on the 13th to suddenly create a three shot advantage. This differential closed, however, as Serhan came back with a birdie on the 14th and Riley bogeyed the 15th hole. However, Riley birdied the final three holes to assure the win. Meanwhile, on the 18th Serhan nearly made an eagle chip. While it would not have been enough to catch Riley, his birdie was enough to secure solo second over Mike Clayton by a shot.

In the mid-1980s, Serhan did not work much as a touring professional. In 1986, in need of a stable job to support his young family, he spent most of the year working at a driving range in Sydney. The following year, he spent 6 months working as a golf coach and again did not play much until the end of the year.

In late 1987, he began to play more. In October 1987, he shot a 68 (−5) in the first round of the Australian PGA Championship, placing him one behind Northern Ireland's Ronan Rafferty. He then shot consecutive rounds of 77−74 to fall out of contention. However, he finished with a three-under-round of 70 to finish in the top-10. A month later, he tied the course record with a 69 (−3) in the third round at the National Panasonic WA Open to put himself in contention. However, he shot over par on Sunday and did not seriously contend. In February 1988, he shot the round of the day at the third round of the ESP Open. Although this put him on the edge of the top-10, he was well behind Greg Norman and did not seriously contend on Sunday. Later in the year, in November, he again played well during the first round of the Australian PGA, recording seven birdies, shooting 68 (−4) to place himself only two back to Brett Ogle. He fired a two-under 70 on Friday to remain two back. He did not play well on the weekend, however, and finished well outside the top-10. Though not part of the PGA Tour of Australasia's calendar that year, he recorded a high finish at the 1988 Queensland Open, finishing in fourth place.

In early 1989 he would have a decent amount of success. In the beginning of the year, in January, he finished in a tie for 5th at the Daikyo Palm Meadows Cup with Japan's Isao Aoki and America's Jeff Maggert. In the star-studded event, he only finished behind champion Curtis Strange, runner-up Raymond Floyd, and fellow Australians Terry Price and Peter Fowler. He defeated big names like Jumbo Ozaki, Greg Norman, and Mark O'Meara. In February 1989 he opened with a 68 at the Australian Masters to put him two back of the lead. He faltered in the remaining rounds, however, and finish in a tie for 44th. In April, he played well at the Taiwan Open. He shot an opening round 64 (−8) to take a four shot lead over a number of players. He fired a second round 70 to maintain the four shot lead. However he was unable to maintain momentum and finished in a tie for fourth. The following week he again played well in the opening rounds, shooting 69−70 at the Korea Open and placing himself in 3rd place. However, he again faltered on the weekend and finished T-29.

For the remainder of 1989, he recorded only one more top-25 and no top-10s. In 1990, this poor play continued. He opened the PGA Tour of Australasia year with three straight missed cuts and did not record a top-25 until March. Around this time, he thought about quitting the game. However, he continued to play through the 1990 calendar year. In the early 1990s he played well at a number of pro-ams. Serhan played excellently at the six round Toshiba pro-am golf series in April 1991. With a second round 67 at Capital Golf Club, he found himself joint overall, "progressive" leader at 137. Serhan then fired a fourth round 68 (−5) to build an eight shot lead over American Wayne Case. Though he finished 74−77 he "was never really threatened" and won the overall purse by five shots. Three years later he again had success at the event. He tied Martin Peterson to share the win at Saturday's event at Cooma. After Sunday's round he held the lead in the Slaven Mazda, the series' overall prize. Serhan largely retired from work as a touring professional after the 1994-95 season.

Since retiring as a touring professional Serhan has worked as a golf coach. He is currently a golf coach at Quakers Hill, New South Wales. He has also worked as a teaching golf professional at Horsley Park, New South Wales.

== Personal life ==
As of 1981 he was married to Susan. His wife was also an excellent golfer and won the 1975 Australian Foursome Championship, an amateur tournament. In spring 1980 his daughter Natalie was born. In addition, Serhan has a brother named John. Like Serhan's wife, John is also an excellent golfer.

In 1981, a horse race was named after Serhan.

== Professional wins (5) ==
=== PGA Tour of Australasia wins (1) ===
No.	Date	Tournament	Winning score	Margin of victory	Runner-up
1	2 Nov 1980	New South Wales Open	−4 (70-68-71-71=280)	4 strokes	(Scotland) Sam Torrance

=== Other wins (3) ===
- 1977 Air New Zealand Fiji Open
- 1979 Western Samoan Open
- 1981 Illawarra Open

=== PGA Legends Tour wins (1) ===
- 2014 Col Crawford BMW Legends Pro-Am (with Richard Backwell)

== Team appearances ==
Professional

- World Cup (representing Australia): 1980
