= Lyndsay Stephen =

Australian professional golfer (1951–2021)

Personal information
- Full name: Lyndsay Stephen
- Nationality: Australia
- Born: March 22, 1956 Donnybrook, Western Australia
- Died: 25 February 2021 (aged 64) Perth, Western Australia
- Height: 6 ft 3 in (191 cm)
- Children: 3

Career
- Sport: Golf
- Turned professional: 1978
- Former tours: PGA Tour of Australasia; European Tour
- Professional wins: 8

Number of wins by tour
- PGA Tour of Australasia: 2
- Other: 6

Lyndsay Stephen (22 March 1956 – 25 February 2021) was an Australian professional golfer. Stephen had much success early in his career, winning the South Australian Open at the age of 24. There were high expectations for him though he did not always meet them, recording at least seven runner-up finishes during the remainder of the 1980s but rarely winning. In the early 1990s he briefly quit tournament golf, focusing to work as a coach. However, he shortly returned and recorded some late career highlights, including victories at the 1996 South Australian PGA Championship and 2010 Australian PGA Seniors Championship.

== Early life ==
Stephen was born in Donnybrook, Western Australia, to Ernest Stephen, a car dealership principal, and Dorothy Stephen, née McKenzie. He had one older sister. Stephen attended Wesley College in Perth, where he boarded as a teenager. His professional golf career began as a PGA Trainee at Lake Karrinyup Country Club under PGA Professional Jock Borthwick.

== Professional career ==
Stephen turned professional at the beginning of 1978. Later in the year he joined the PGA Tour of Australia. Stephen first received media attention that October at the West Lakes Classic. He shot a bogey-free opening round 67 (−4) to tie the lead with Bob Shearer. He did not play as well on Friday but managed to make a four-metre birdie putt on the final hole for a 72 (+1) to maintain possession of the lead. He ultimately finished in a tie for 13th.

In 1980, he had his first year of continuous success as a touring professional. In February, he took the outright lead at the midway point of the Victorian Open. He finished in a tie for sixth. The veteran golfer Alan Murray was at the event. He was impressed with Stephen's talent, stating that he was a "future world champion." "I have never seen anyone hitting a long ball with such ease," he stated shortly after the event. "His effortless-like swing is unbelievable from the tremendous distance he covers." In April, he finished in a tie for third place at the Legacy-CIG pro-am in Perth, Australia. In September, this good play culminated with a high result at the New South Wales PGA Championship. He was well back for most of the tournament but played well on Sunday while the leaders fell back. He was near the lead down the stretch but missed a one-metre putt on the 72nd hole. This would be crucial as he ultimately finished one behind champion Ted Ball. Despite the disappointing final hole his runner-up finish was his hitherto highest placing.

In February 1981, Stephen recorded his first victory at the South Australia Open. He played "stunning" golf during the second round culminating with a holed bunker shot for an eagle on the last hole. Stephen's 67 (−5) was the best round of the tournament so far and put him at 140 (−4), one ahead of a number of players. He "maintained his sparkling form" on Saturday with a 70 (−2) to continue to hold a one shot lead. On Sunday, he played poorly early but birdied the 9th hole and "tightened his game" after the turn. Stephen finished at 282 (−6) and defeated Rodger Davis by three. Later in the year he won the Spalding Park Open, held in Spalding, Western Australia, for the first time with a score of 218 (+2).

In the early 1980s, Stephen posted several runner-ups finishes. The first of these was at the 1981 New South Wales Open. Stephen started the final round well behind leader Bill Rogers and second place holder Peter Senior. However, the leaders played poorly and Stephen's 71 (−2) was good enough to move into solo second place. His A$6,860 paycheck was his highest ever. In August and early September 1982, despite "restricted tournament play," he recorded three runner-up finishes in his home state of Western Australia.

In late September 1982, Stephen played the New South Wales PGA Championship. In the first round, he played one-over-par golf through the first 12 holes. Stephen then "stormed home" with birdies on the 13th, 15th, and 17th holes and closed with a final hole eagle. He was one back of Bob Shaw's lead. In the second round, Stephen again played excellently on the back nine scoring a bogey-free 33 (−4). His 68 (−5) tied him for the lead with Wayne Grady. Stephen played much worse on Saturday, shooting four-over-par on the first 14 holes. However, he closed with a birdie and eagle to score a 74 (+1). Stephen entered the final round in second place, two behind leader Grady. On Sunday, he played well on the front nine to stay close to leaders Grady and Frank Nobilo. On the back nine, Stephen again caught fire, birdieing four of six holes starting on the 11th, to tie Nobilo for the lead. The par-5 18th hole – a hole that Stephen eagled twice previously – would be crucial. Stephen's approach on the hole stopped near a pathway. He did not get relief and his chip shot landed in the back rough. From there he took three, finishing with a bogey six. "I tried to put it on the board and let Frank make the mistakes but it backfired on me," he said later. "With the amount of golf I play a bloke should not make those mistakes." Stephen finished with a 69 (−4) for a 280 (−12) aggregate, one behind Nobilo.

In late 1982 and early 1983, by virtue of these good performances, Stephen was often considered the favorites among newspaper writers at tournaments, especially in Asia. However, he went several years without much media attention. One of the few tournament he received significant attention for during this era was the 1984 Rolex Masters. The event was held in Singapore early in the year. Stephen was in the lead after two rounds. However, the American golfer Bill Israelson outplayed him in the third round and Stephen fell two behind. Stephen then bogeyed the second hole to begin to fall out of the picture. Israelson ultimately defeated him by a large margin.

In the middle of 1985 he began to play better. In May he seriously contended for the Nedlands Masters. After three rounds he was at 205 (−11), one behind leader Terry Gale. However, amidst "inclement conditions" Stephen shot a 75 (+3) to finish five behind Gale. The rest of the challengers also played poorly, however, so Stephen still finished solo second. A month later he began playing on the European Tour. It was the first time he played on the tour. He recorded a top-10 at his first event, the Jersey Open. He showed mixed form the remainder of the season, however. At his next tournament, the Carroll's Irish Open, he opened with an 86 and missed the cut by a wide margin. On 15 July, he attempted to qualify for the 1985 Open Championship. He shot a 77 to put him in jeopardy of not qualifying. He did not qualify for the event. For the remainder of the season, Stephen made the cut in four of his final five events but did not record anything better than a tie for 24th.

Shortly thereafter, Stephen returned to Australia. Stephen began playing well again in late 1985. In October he played the New South Wales Open. He finished at 282 (−2), one out of an expected playoff between Ian Stanley and Terry Gale. At the end of the tournament, however, Gale was notified that he incurred a two-stroke penalty earlier on the front nine that he was not aware of at the time. As a result, Stephen then finished joint runner-up with Peter Senior. In May 1986, he again played well at the Nedlands Masters. In the third round he "produced some of the best golf of his career." He nearly made a hole-in-one on the 12th hole, beginning a stretch of five consecutive birdies. His 66 (−6) put him at 206 (−10), one behind leader Peter Jones. On Sunday he eagled the first hole to take the solo lead. He again nearly made a hole-in-one, this time on the par-3 7th, to assure birdie and expand his lead. Overall, Stephen shot a 32 on the front nine to outscore playing partner Jones by eight shots. He cruised home from there, nearly holing out another approach shot − this time a 6-iron on the 72nd hole − for a final birdie. His second consecutive 66 gave him a nine-stoke win over Ian Stanley.

Shortly after his win, he returned to Europe. Stephen opened the tour poorly, missing the cut in three of his first four events. He played much better at his fifth event, the Car Care Plan International. He led the tournament after the second round. He shot a third round 76 to fall out of contention though. He shot a final round 70, however, to finish in a tie for ninth. In addition to the good placing, Stephen had a chance to qualify for the 1986 Open Championship at the tournament. Five top finishers at the Car Care event could qualify automatically for the Open. By virtue of his high finish, Stephen entered a playoff with three other players to see who was allocated the final spot. Stephen did not move on, however, as fellow Australian Mike Clayton won the playoff. For the remainder of the year in Europe, he did not have much success. He was disqualified, withdrew, or missed the cut in six of his final eight events with no high finishes.

Like the previous season, Stephen returned to Australia. At the New South Wales Open, he shot rounds of 67 and 69 to get into contention, in solo third place. Against strong winds most his challengers, including leader Greg Norman, struggled but Stephen himself had a "frustrating" final round punctuated by an eagle-three at the 71st hole and a bogey at the 72nd hole. His 72 (+1), however, was good enough to move into solo second place, five behind champion Norman. It was his second straight runner-up at the event. It was also his eighth runner-up finish in recent years. The following week he seriously contended at the South Australian Open. He shot a third round 68 to tie David Graham for the lead. However, he was the "big loser" on Sunday with a 79 (+7) to finish well back. Roughly two weeks later, he played at the Victorian PGA Championship pro-am, tying Ossie Moore for the victory after a 63 (−9). Later in the month he shot a third round 69 (−3) at the Western Australian Open to move into the top ten. He shot another 69 in the final round to finish in a tie for fourth with Mark O'Meara. In January 1987, he opened with 137 (−9) at the U-Bix Classic to place himself in the top-10, one back of second place. He ultimately finished in a tie fifth place at 278 (−14).

In May 1987, he returned to Europe for his third season on the European Tour. He opened the season excellently with three straight top-10s. However, he played poorly thereafter, missing the cut in six of his last nine events. In September, he returned to Australia. The poor play continued though Stephen did receive some media attention for his play in mid-November. On November 11 he opened with a 71 (−1) at the South Australian Open to position himself in a tie for fourth. However, he played poorly thereafter and finished in a tie for 25th. The following week, he played the National Panasonic WA Open. During the first round, he broke the course record at the Joondalup Golf Course with a 69 (−3) to take the lead. In the second round, he shot several over-par to fall behind. In the third round, he got back in contention with a 33 (−3) on the front nine. However, his comeback ended when his approach on the par-4 14th sailed into a limestone quarry leading to triple bogey. Despite this, he still managed a top-10 finish. In February 1988, Stephen recorded a solo fourth place finish at the Victorian Open.

Later in 1988, Stephen returned to Europe. He had mixed results for the first two months, making the cut in four of seven events with one top-25 and no top-10s. Stephen played much better during his eighth event on the year, the Monte Carlo Open. After rounds of 72 and 68 Stephen barely made the cut. However, he played excellently on the weekend. He shot a third round 62 to move into contention and a final round 66 to finish solo fourth. For the remainder of the European season, however, Stephen did not play much better, missing the cut or withdrawing from six of his final seven events.

After the season ended, he returned to Australia. In October, he played the New South Wales Open. He opened with a 64 (−7) breaking the old course record at Concord Golf Club by two shots, tying Craig Parry for the lead. He then shot consecutive rounds of 73 (+2) to fall several shots back. He ultimately finished in a tie for fourth. In November he seriously contended at the Australian PGA Championship and was in the top ten after the first round. He remained in the top ten after three rounds. In November he shot a second round 68 (−2) to move into contention at the South Australian Open. He finished in a tie for eighth. In January 1989 he seriously contended at the Coca-Cola Classic, holding down joint fourth place after three rounds. He played poorly in the final round, however, and finished in a tie for 13th.

In May 1989, he returned to Europe. He made the cut in four of his first seven tournaments but did not record any top-25s. In July, he attempted to qualify for the 1989 Open Championship. At Kilmarnock, he shot an opening round 72 (+1) to put him near the number to get in. However, he missed qualifying by two shots. The following week he opened well at the Dutch Open, opening with a 67. He followed with a 70 to stay in the top ten. For the remainder of the year, Stephen showed mixed form, making the cut in five of his final nine European Tour events with two top-25s and no top-10s.

Stephen again returned to Australia for the 1989–90 season. He did not record many highlights. In 11 events he recorded a number of top-25s but no top tens until his final event of the season, the Nedlands Masters.

In 1990, Stephen did not return to Europe. For most of the early 1990s he did not play much as a touring professional. He primarily worked as a coach.

In 1992, he re-joined the PGA Tour of Australasia. In February, he contented at the Australian Masters. He opened with a 75 (+2), but moved himself into a tie for third with a second round 68 (−5). He finished in a tie for fourth. In 1993, he recorded several highlights. In January, at the Heineken Classic, he shot consecutive rounds of 68 (−4) to tie Peter Senior for the lead. He finished the tournament in tie for eighth. In November, he played well at the Australian Open finishing in a tie for ninth with, among others, Curtis Strange and Robert Allenby. At the 1994 Reebok Australian PGA Championship, he shot the round of the day on Saturday, a 67 (−5), to jump ahead of 36 players and move into a tie for fourth. He finished the event in a tie for ninth. The following week, he also recorded a top-10 at the Australian Open.

Stephen's final seasons during his regular career was during the mid-late 1990s. In November 1995, he played well during the beginning of the Victorian Open, opening one off the lead at the midway point. After a third round 72, he remained in contention, three back of the lead. He finished in a tie for fifth. The following February he recorded a top ten at the South Australian Ford Open.

In May 1996, he played the South Australian PGA Championship at McCracken Golf Club. Stephen started the final round at even-par 216, eight back of the lead. However, he shot a final round 62 (−10) to take the clubhouse lead. At the par-5 final hole joint leader Craig Spence missed a three-metre birdie putt to win the tournament outright. Stephen and Spence returned to the 18th for a sudden-death playoff. Stephen hit his three-wood approach to 10 centimeters to assure an eagle and the win.

The following season, at the beginning of 1997, he recorded a tie for eleventh at the Australian Masters, one behind Tiger Woods. Stephen did not record many more highlights after the 1996–97 season. He largely retired as a touring professional after the 1997–98 season.

=== Senior career ===
In the 2010s Stephen began to play on the senior tours. In 2010, Stephen started playing on the European Senior Tour. He played in two events but did not make a significant mark. Later he returned to Australia for the Legends Tour. He had much success early in the season with several top fives but struggled coming down the stretch, failing to win. In November he played the Fiducian Legends Australian PGA Championship. He opened with a 69 (−3) to position himself two off the lead, in a tie for third. He shot a second round 73 (+1) that, in difficult conditions, moved him to within one of the lead held by Delroy Cambridge. During the third and final round, Stephen fell three shots behind playing partner Cambridge. However, on the 16th hole Cambridge hit "an uncustomary wayward drive" that led to triple bogey. He and Stephen were now tied. On the next hole Stephen hit his birdie putt three-feet past but managed a "tense par." They remained tied. At the 18th Cambridge hit a perfect drive while Stephen's landed in the right rough. Cambridge hit his approach on the green. Stephen "appeared to be stymied by a group of tall trees" but managed to get his approach on the green. Cambridge left his birdie putt short. Stephen had an uphill 18-foot putt which he hit with "perfect pace" and "never looked like missing.” His birdie won the championship. Stephen won A$18,000.

In 2011, Stephen returned to Europe. He played more, playing in six events, including the Senior PGA Championship, a senior major. However he made the cut in only three events and did not record any high finishes.

== Professional wins (8) ==
=== PGA Tour of Australia wins (2) ===
No.	Date	Tournament	Winning score	Margin of victory	Runner-up
1	21 Feb 1981	South Australian Open	−6 (73-67-70-72=282)	3 strokes	(Australia) Rodger Davis
2	18 May 1986	Halls Head Estates-Nissan Nedlands Masters	−16 (70-70-66-66=272)	9 strokes	(Australia) Ian Stanley

=== Other wins (4) ===
- 1981 Spalding Park Open
- 1991 Spalding Park Open
- 1994 South West Open
- 1996 South Australian PGA Championship

=== PGA of Australia Legends Tour wins (2) ===
note: this list is probably incomplete

- 2010 Fiducian Legends Australian PGA Championship
- 2015 David Mercer Seniors Classic Pro-Am (with Simon Jagot)
