= Mike Ferguson (golfer) =

Australian professional golfer (born 1952)

Personal information
- Full name: Michael Ferguson
- Nationality: Australia
- Born: 26 January 1952 (age 74)

Career
- Sport: Golf
- Turned professional: 1973
- Former tour: PGA Tour of Australasia
- Professional wins: 17

Number of wins by tour
- PGA Tour of Australasia: 3
- Other: 14

Best results in major championships
- Masters Tournament: DNP
- PGA Championship: DNP
- U.S. Open: DNP
- The Open Championship: T53: 1981

Mike Ferguson (born 26 January 1952) is an Australian professional golfer. Ferguson was one of Australia's top golfers during the late 1970s and early 1980s. In 1977 he won the Western Australian Open for his breakthrough victory. Two years later he won back-to-back events, the Illawarra Open and Gold Coast Classic. In 1981, "his most successful year," he won two state PGA championships, the New South Wales PGA Championship and the Queensland PGA Championship. Shortly thereafter, citing poor discipline, his game declined; Ferguson failed to make the PGA Tour and he would not win another official regular event. As a senior, however, Ferguson would have some success, winning five significant events in the Australasian region, including the Australian Seniors PGA Championship twice.

== Early life ==
Ferguson is from Brisbane, Australia. As a youth, Ferguson focused mainly on swimming, boxing, and rugby. After an injury, however, he began to focus on golf. He turned pro in 1973.

== Professional career ==
One of the earliest highlights of his professional career was at the October 1973 North Coast Open pro-am. He finished joint runner-up, one behind American Jerry Stolhand. In November 1974, he was in joint third place after the first round of the City of Auckland Classic, only behind Stewart Ginn and Tom Kite, tied with, among others, Hubert Green.

In the mid-1970s Ferguson started playing on the international scene. He would play on foreign circuits for the remainder of his career. As of February 1975, he was playing events on the Asia Golf Circuit. In 1975 Ferguson also started playing some events on the European Tour. Ferguson also played in Japan during this stage of his career.

Ferguson would have much success in April 1977 in Western Australia. In early April he played in the Western Australia PGA Championship held at Sun City Country Club. During the final day, he "appeared to lay the foundation for a win" after the opening two holes; he was the only player among the leaders not to drop a shot. He then birdied the 5th to improve his chances. However, he double-bogeyed the 7th and then bogeyed the par-3 8th. He would not be in contention on the back nine. Ferguson finished in solo 5th, four behind champion Kel Nagle. Two weeks later he played the Western Australian Open. Ferguson started slowly, failing to break par the first two rounds. He got a new putter before the third round which changed his attitude. He shot a 67 (−5) on Saturday to put him in contention, two out of the lead jointly held by Chris Tickner, Vaughan Somers, and Barry Burgess. On Sunday, Ferguson birdied Mount Lawley's 2nd and 3rd holes to quickly tie the lead. The overnight leaders struggled and Ferguson held a two stroke lead at the turn. Ferguson, however, bogeyed the 10th to fall back to field. The remainder of the tournament would be "a tense affair." Ferguson parred the next three holes. He birdied the 14th but bogeyed the 15th. At the 16th, he drove the par-4 creating an easy birdie and clinching the win. He shot his second straight 67 (−5) to finish at 281 (−7). He defeated joint runner-ups Burgess and Somers by three and Tickner by four. It was Ferguson's first win. "I didn't think I was ever going to break through," he said immediately after the round.

Much later in the year Ferguson recorded two top-3 finishes. During the final round of the Queensland Open, Ferguson led "a charge" against leader Hal Underwood with eagles on the 9th and 11th. However, he "faltered on the back nine" and finished in a tie for third, two back of Underwood. A month and a half later, in November, he seriously competed at the Australian PGA Championship. During the second round, he played erratically, hitting three tee shots into the woods and bogeying the par-5 ninth hole. However, good recovery shots and an excellent short game helped him shoot a 67 (−5) to take the lead at 138 (−6). He did not play particularly well on the weekend but finished with an eagle and a birdie on the 70th and 72nd holes, respectively, to achieve solo second. Around this time he was regarded as "one of the talented young lions of Australian golf." He intended to try out for the PGA Tour later in the year at the PGA Tour Qualifying Tournament.

Ferguson had a number of top finishes in 1978. In April, he finished joint runner-up at the Western Australian Open, three behind champion David Galloway. Late in the year he won two minor tournaments in the Australasian region. In September he won the Papua New Guinea Open, defeating Englishman Guy Wolstenholme by six shots. Shortly thereafter he won the Mount Isa tournament in Mount Isa, Queensland.

The following year Ferguson attempted to qualify for the 1979 Open Championship. Among the 19 Australians who attempted to qualify at the Lancashire courses, he was one of eight to succeed. It was the first major championship he qualified for. He missed the cut.

Late in 1979, he returned to the Australasian region and won back-to-back events. At the Illawarra Open he briefly took the first round lead on the front nine but double-bogeyed the 11th and bogeyed the next two holes. He was several shots behind Tom Linksey at this point. Starting the fourth round, he remained behind Linksey. Against "blustery conditions" the leaders fell apart, however, and Ferguson's 73 (+1) was enough to win by one. Linksey and Chris Tickner finished in second place. The following week, on September 27, he began play at the Gold Coast Classic. Aided by Stewart Ginn's triple bogey on the 15th hole of the third round, Ferguson took a three stroke lead entering Sunday. The lead expanded to five strokes after nine holes. However, Ferguson "frittered away" this lead over the course of the back nine and was tied with Ginn at the end of regulation. Ferguson, however, birdied the third sudden-death playoff hole to win. These were his first two official wins on the PGA Tour of Australia.

Late in 1979 had a number of other opportunities to win. In mid-October, Ferguson played the Garden State Victorian PGA Championship. He shot a third round 72 to place himself at 215 (−1), one back of joint lead between Ginn and Ian Stanley. He shot a disappointing 77 (+5) on Sunday, however, to finish in solo sixth, six out of a playoff. Two weeks after that, he played at the West Lakes Classic. He opened well with a 70 (−2), two back of the lead. He fell six behind entering the third round, however. On Saturday, Ferguson "headed the challenge" against leader Glen McCully. Playing against "chilling south-easterly winds," his third round 71 (−1) was among the best of the day. It included a 12-foot birdie on the 18th hole. He was at 213 (−3), in solo second, one behind McCully. He ultimately finished in a tie for fourth at 288 (E), three behind champion David Graham. In December, he played the South Seas Classic. Ferguson shot three consecutive rounds of 71 (−1) to position himself in third place, two back of Wayne Grady and one back of Greg Norman. In the final round, he shot a 73 and finished at 286 (−2), one behind champion Rick Mallicoat, tied with Grady for second.

In 1980, he once again qualified for the Open Championship. He shot a first round 78 (+7) but followed with a 70 (−1) to make the cut by a shot. He shot a third round 73 (+2) and missed the third round cut by two strokes. During the European summer he also won the Rolex Open, an unofficial event in Geneva, Switzerland. By September he had returned to Australia. At the New South Wales Open in September, Ferguson shot 141 (−1) for the first two days to put him within four of Bob Charles' lead. During the third round, he shot a 72 to finish at 213 (E), remaining within four of the lead. In the final round, he shot over par but still finished in the top five. In October, he played the Gold Coast Classic, defending his championship. He shot an opening round 67 (−5) to put him one back of Ian Baker-Finch's lead. After a second round 70 he remained in second place, one back. After another 70 he remained in contention, one back of leader Chris Tickner. He shot a disappointing final round 74, however, to finish in a tie for sixth, two back.

In the middle of 1981 he would have his best performance at a major championship. At the 1981 Open Championship he shot a 72 (+2) to make the second round cut. He was at 147 (+7). He shot a third round 71 (+1) to make the third round cut. Ferguson shot a final round 79 (+9) and finished at 297 (+17), in a tie for 52nd place. This was the only time he made the cut at a major championship.

Late in the year he won two state PGA championships in Australia. In October 1981, he played the New South Wales PGA Championship. He opened with a 66 (−6) to take the lead. It was a course record at Penrith Golf Club. In the second round, "despite some problems," he shot an even-par 72 to maintain the lead. Early in the third round, he made bogeys at the fourth and sixth to briefly lose the lead. However, he began to turn this around with a birdie at the 7th. At the 8th he made a 20-metre-chip for birdie. He later stated this was the "turning point" in the round. He would continue to play well on the back nine, shooting a 34 (−2), for a two shot lead over Brian Jones and John Kelly. In the final round, he shot a 33 (−3) on the front nine to create a four shot lead. He came back to the field after a double-bogey on the 11th. His lead was only one near the end of the tournament. However, his lead challenger Brian Jones sliced his 72nd hole tee shot in the water and made bogey. Ferguson won by two at 278 (−10). It was a wire-to-wire win.

In November he played the Australian Open. He opened poorly with a 74 and 76 to put himself six-over-par. He played much better during the final two rounds, shooting 71-69. His aggregate total was at 290 (+2) and he finished solo seventh. Among the players that made the cut, including champion Bill Rogers and runner-up Greg Norman, none scored better than Ferguson on the weekend.

In December 1981, he played at the Queensland PGA Championship. After opening with a 73 (+1) he shot a second round 68 (−4) to take a one stroke lead over Bob Shaw. In the third round, Ferguson extended his lead after a birdie-bogey exchange with Shaw on the second hole. He chipped in on the fourth for another birdie. Ferguson ultimately shot a 71 (−1), the second best round of the day on a "soggy course," to take a five shot lead entering the final round. This differential immediately tightened on Sunday's front nine as Ferguson shot a 38 (+2) and Shaw had gotten within two. Ferguson settled down with a four-metre birdie putt at the 10th. He then birdied the 16th and "cruised home" thereafter. He finished with a 73 (+1) to win by three over Shaw. At 285 (−3) he was the only player to finish under par. Late in the year he also won the Mount Isa tournament again. 1981 was later described as his "most successful year."

Ferguson then spent "several years in the golfing wilderness" failing to advance on his 1981 successes. Later in life Ferguson cited a "lack of maturity" and poor practice habits as reasons why he did not advance. He did occasionally receive media attention in the mid-1980s. He recorded top tens at the 1982 Australian Masters, 1983 Singapore Open, 1983 Scandinavian Enterprise Open, 1983 Queensland PGA Championship, 1984 Australian Masters, and 1986 Pocari Sweat Open. He also won an unofficial team event in Japan in 1985, the Acom Doubles with partner Brian Jones.

In the late 1980s Ferguson had more continuous success as a touring professional. In February 1987 he played the Rich River Classic. During the final round he shot a "brilliant" 65 (−7) to finish in solo second place, two behind Peter Senior. Ferguson intended to try out for the PGA Tour at the PGA Tour Qualifying Tournament later in the year. It would be his third attempt. He "narrowly missed" the previous two times. In December 1987 he recorded a top ten finished at the New Zealand Open. The following month, in January 1988, he recorded consecutive top tens at Sanctuary Cove Classic and Daikyo Palm Meadows Cup. In February he recorded a T-5 at the ESP Open at Royal Canberra Golf Club, shooting a 67 (−5) in the final round. In November, his aggregate 287 (−1) at the Tasmanian Open was good enough for solo fourth place.

The early 1990s were the final years Ferguson had highlights on the regular tours. In January, he played excellently at the Sanctuary Cove Classic held in his home state of Queensland. He shot a second round 67 (−5) to get into contention. On Sunday, with the struggles of the leaders Frank Nobilo and Rodger Davis, Ferguson took the solo lead by the 14th hole. He double-bogeyed the par-5 17th, however, "to blow his chances." He finished in a tie for third, two behind Davis. A year and half later, in November 1992, he achieved consecutive top-10s at the Ford Australian PGA Championship and Heineken Australian Open. The following year, 1993, would be the last full-time season during his regular tour career. His best finish overall that year was a tie for 14th at the Heineken Australian Open.

For the remainder of the 1990s Ferguson usually only played in a handful of events a year, if at all. Ferguson largely focused on his work at business during this era. "I pretty much gave up golf for a while and got tied up in a few business ventures," he stated later in life. Ferguson received some media attention in 1999 when his brother-in-law Payne Stewart died in a plane crash. Hours after his death he was interviewed by the Australian radio program "The World Today." He spoke to mourners at the funeral.

=== Senior career ===
In January 2002 he turned 50. The previous year he had already earned with European Senior Tour's card at Qualifying School, finishing in 11th place. In 2002 he recorded two top-tens on the European Senior Tour. Later in the year he won the 2002 Australian PGA Seniors Championship. In 2003 he again toured in Europe but only played in four events. In 2003 he also won the Malaysian Seniors Open. In 2004 he returned to Europe and played much more, recording two top-tens in 20 events. Later in 2004 he again played excellently at the Australian Seniors PGA Championship. The event was played at Club Pelican, his home club. Ferguson was eight shots behind leader Brian Jones entering the final round. However, he finished solidly with a 68 (−4), tying Jones for the round of the tournament. Jones, meanwhile, collapsed down the stretch, bogeying the 16th and the 17th and then triple-bogeying the 18th. Both men finished at 291 (+3). They entered a sudden-death playoff. Jones hit his drive into a fairway bunker. Ferguson "drove straight" in the middle of the fairway. His approach landed two-metres from the hole to "set up a comfortable par." Jones, meanwhile, made bogey to lose. It was Ferguson's second win in the event.

Later in the year he intended to try to join the PGA Senior Tour in the United States. At Senior Q-School Ferguson finished in a tie for 13th at 417 (−15). He played in five events during the 2005 season but did not record any high finishes.

In 2006 he played the New Zealand Senior PGA Championship. He entered the final round five shots behind leader Richard Beer. Playing against 40-60kmh winds, Ferguson shot a "brilliant" 68 to win the tournament by 5 shots. Several observers stated it was the best round they had ever seen at the Wairaki Golf Course. Ferguson stated after the round, "It's probably as good a round as I have ever played." He was one of only three players to break 80. The following year he largely stopped playing on the European Senior Tour.

In 2008 he played at the Greater Building Society Australian Masters Invitational. The event was held at Emerald Lakes Golf Club in Queensland. In the final round Ferguson birdied four of the first six holes to stay competitive with first round leader Stuart Reese who scored similarly. On the back nine Ferguson pulled away as Reese made a number of bogeys. He finished with a 71 (−1) to defeat Resse and Ian Baker-Finch by two. With the victory, Ferguson won $A30,000 and a golf cart worth $A10,000. It was his first win in two year. “This is totally unexpected," he said afterwards.

As of 2017, he was still playing in some golf tournaments. That year he played in the Ladbrokes PGA Series Pro-Am.

== Personal life ==
Ferguson has lived in Queensland for most of his life. In 1952 he was born in Brisbane. During his career he was associated with Helensvale Golf Club in Helensvale, Queensland and Club Pelican in Pelican Waters, Queensland. Late in life he resided in Brisbane.

Ferguson has a sister named Tracey. She was married to Payne Stewart. Tracey met Stewart in Kuala Lumpur, Malaysia. She was there to see Ferguson play in a golf tournament.

Ferguson has two daughters, Sarah and Micaela.

== Professional wins (17) ==
=== PGA Tour of Australasia wins (3) ===
No.	Date	Tournament	Winning score	Margin of victory	Runner(s)-up
1	23 Sep 1979	Illawarra Open	E (70-69-76-73=288)	1 stroke	(Australia) Tom Linskey, (Australia) Chris Tickner
2	30 Sep 1979	Tooth's Gold Coast – Tweed Classic	−7 (71-67-71-72=281)	Playoff	(Australia) Stewart Ginn
3	11 Oct 1981	National Panasonic New South Wales PGA Championship	−10 (66-72-71-69=278)	2 strokes	(Australia) Brian Jones

PGA Tour of Australasia playoff record (1–0)

No.	Year	Tournament	Opponent	Result
1	1979	Tooth's Gold Coast – Tweed Classic	(Australia) Stewart Ginn	Won with birdie on third extra hole

=== Other regular wins (7) ===
- 1977 Western Australian Open
- 1978 Papua New Guinea Open, Mount Isa tournament
- 1980 Rolex Open (Switzerland)
- 1981 Queensland PGA Championship, Mount Isa tournament
- 1985 Acom Doubles (with Brian Jones)

=== PGA of Australia Legends Tour wins (5) ===
note: this list is probably incomplete

- 2002 Australian PGA Seniors Championship
- 2004 Australian Seniors PGA Championship
- 2008 Greater Building Society Australian Masters Invitational
- 2013 Tasmanian Senior Open, SA PGA Senior Foursomes Championship (with Terry Price)

=== Other senior wins (2) ===
- 2003 Malaysian Senior Open
- 2006 New Zealand Senior PGA Championship

== Results in major championships ==
Tournament	1979	1980	1981	1982	1983
The Open Championship	CUT	CUT	T53	CUT	CUT

CUT = missed the halfway cut (3rd round cut in 1980 and 1983 Open Championships)
"T" = Tied
Note: Ferguson only played in The Open Championship.
