= Halls Head Western Open =

Golf tournament

Tournament information
- Location: Halls Head, Western Australia
- Course: Mandurah Country Club
- Par: 72
- Tour: PGA Tour of Australasia
- Format: Stroke play
- Final year: 1983

Final champion
- Bob Shaw

Location map
- Location in Australia Location in Western Australia

The Halls Head Western Open, also known as the Mandurah Classic, was a golf tournament in Australia.

== History ==
The tournament was founded in 1979 as the Mandurah Classic. The event was held at Mandurah Country Club in Halls Head, Mandurah, Western Australia. The event was managed by Tuohy and Associates, a golf management group run by Bob Tuohy, a former professional golfer. In the inaugural event, local resident Terry Gale came from behind in the final round to match the course record with a 66 (−6) and win by five shots. The following year, Gale repeated as champion.

In 1981 and 1982, the event became part of the PGA Tour of Australia. The purse increased significantly to A$30,000. The first two rounds were a neck and neck struggle between Bob Shaw and Colin Bishop with Terry Gale close behind. In the third round, however, Bishop and Shaw "faded" with over-par rounds. Gale, meanwhile, scored four consecutive birdies on the back nine for a five-under-par 67. He suddenly led by seven shots. In the final round, Shaw recorded a number of birdies on the back nine to reduce Gale's lead to two. However, he bogeyed the 17th and Gale finished two strokes ahead. It was his third consecutive victory in the event. The following year, Gale was among the favorites, and held the lead after the first three rounds. However, in the final round he failed to make a birdie, and Mike Cahill took advantage, shooting a 70 to win by a stroke. In 1983, Bob Shaw, who had been runner-up in both 1981 and 1982, won by a stoke from Peter Fowler after having a two-stroke penalty applied for replacing a tee marker on the final hole.

== Winners ==
Year	Winner	Score	To par	Margin of victory	Runner(s)-up	Purse (A$)	Ref.
Mandurah Classic
1979	Terry Gale	283	−5	6 strokes	Stewart Ginn	9,000	
1980	Terry Gale					10,000	
Halls Head Western Open
1981	Terry Gale	281	−7	2 strokes	Bob Shaw	30,000	
1982	Mike Cahill	279	−9	1 stroke	Terry Gale; Wayne Grady; Bob Shaw	35,000	
1983	Bob Shaw	285	−3	1 stroke	Peter Fowler	35,000	
