= Australian PGA Seniors Championship =

Golf tournament in Australia

The Australian PGA Seniors Championship is a golf tournament in Australia.

== History ==
The inaugural event was held in 1986. Legendary golfer Peter Thomson referred to the tournament as "a breakthrough" for Australian senior golf. The 1986 and 1987 events were played concurrently with the Rich River Classic, a regular event on the PGA Tour of Australia. Both were won by the American Orville Moody. The regular PGA Tour of Australia event, The Rich River Classic, was discontinued in 1988 because of a clash of dates. However, the Rich River Golf Course continued to host the seniors championship until 1995. The 1988 championship was won by Jerry Stolhand. Stolhand, an American who had lived in Australia since 1969, was killed in a car accident in February 1989 and was unable to defend the title.

In 1996, star American golfer Lee Trevino played the event. It was the first event he played in Australia in a decade. He played it as a gift to his friend Bruce Devlin who designed Gold Creek Country Club, the course the event was played on. He went on to win.

In recent years the event has been held at Richmond Golf Club. In late 2020 it was announced that the course got a two-year extension to host the tournament through 2022.

== Winners ==
Year	Winner	Score	To par	Margin of victory	Runner(s)-up	Venue	Ref.
Sharp EIT Solutions Australian PGA Senior Championship
2025	(Australia) Jason Norris						
Nova Employment Australian PGA Senior Championship
2024	(Australia) Andre Stolz	190	−17	5 strokes	(Australia) Matthew Goggin, (Australia) Jason Norris	Richmond Golf Club	
2023	(Australia) Jason Norris	196	−14	5 strokes	(Australia) Stephen Allan (Australia) Peter Lonard	Richmond Golf Club	
2022	(Australia) Richard Green	199	−11	1 stroke	(Australia) Andre Stolz	Richmond Golf Club	
R.M. Williams Australian PGA Seniors Championship
2021	(Australia) Guy Wall	66 (Note: Shortened to 18 holes due to rain.)	−4	Playoff (Note: Wall won with a birdie on the fifth playoff hole.)	(Australia) Peter Lonard	Richmond Golf Club	
Australian PGA Seniors Championship
2020	(Australia) Andre Stolz	201	−9	4 strokes	(Australia) Peter Lonard	Richmond Golf Club	
2019	(Australia) Peter Senior	201	−9	1 stroke	(Australia) Peter Fowler (Australia) Peter O'Malley	Richmond Golf Club	
2018	(New Zealand) Michael Long	198	−12	1 stroke	(Australia) Peter Senior	Richmond Golf Club	
2017	(Australia) David McKenzie (Note: The championship was incorporated into the Sunshine Coast Masters.)	202	−14	6 strokes	(Australia) Peter Senior	Twin Waters Golf Club & Pelican Waters Golf Club	
2016	(New Zealand) Martin Pettigrew	214	−2	3 strokes	(Australia) David Merriman	Mollymook Golf Club (Hilltop)	
Coca-Cola Australian PGA Seniors Championship
2015	(Australia) Rodger Davis	203	−7	Playoff (Note: Davis won with a birdie on the third playoff hole. Senior was eliminated at the first extra hole.)	(Australia) Mike Harwood (Australia) Peter Senior	Richmond Golf Club	
Australian PGA Seniors Championship
2014	(New Zealand) Simon Owen	208	−2	Playoff (Note: Owen won with a birdie on the first playoff hole.)	(Australia) Mike Harwood	Richmond Golf Club	
2013	(Australia) Darryl Purchase	210	E	2 strokes	(Australia) Kym Olsen	Richmond Golf Club	
2012	(Australia) Mike Harwood	124 (Note: Contested over 36 holes.)	−6	2 strokes	(Australia) Mike Zilko	Gordon Golf Club	
2011	(Australia) Peter Fowler	207	−9	9 strokes	(Australia) Mike Clayton (Australia) David Hill	Killara Golf Club	
2010	(Australia) Lyndsay Stephen	214	−2	2 strokes	(Jamaica) Delroy Cambridge	Killara Golf Club	
2009	(Australia) Peter Senior	207	−9	8 strokes	(Australia) Larry Canning (Australia) Mike Harwood	Byron Bay Golf Club	
2008	(Australia) Noel Ratcliffe	212	−4	6 strokes	(Australia) John Clifford (Australia) Terry Gale (Australia) David Merriman (New Zealand) Stuart Reese	Byron Bay Golf Club	
2007	(Australia) David Merriman	215	−1	2 strokes	(Australia) Garry Merrick (New Zealand) Craig Owen	Byron Bay Golf Club	
2006	(Australia) Terry Gale	216	E	7 strokes	(New Zealand) Stuart Reese	Newcastle Golf Club	
2005	(United States) Tom Purtzer	206 (Note: Shortened to 54 holes due to rain.)	−10	5 strokes	(Scotland) John Chillas	Club Pelican	
2004	(Australia) Mike Ferguson	291	+3	Playoff	(Australia) Brian Jones	Club Pelican	
2003	(Australia) John Clifford	218	+2	2 strokes	(Australia) Geoff Parslow	Penrith Golf Club	
2002	(Australia) Mike Ferguson	207	−9	6 strokes	(Australia) Bryan Smith	Penrith Golf Club	
2001	(Australia) Noel Ratcliffe	206		Playoff (Note: Radcliife won on the first extra hole.)	(Australia) David Good	Penrith Golf Club	
2000	(New Zealand) Barry Vivian	208	−8	4 strokes	(Australia) Ian Brander (Australia) Frank Conallin	Penrith Golf Club	
1999	(Australia) Trevor Downing					Twin Waters Golf Club	
1998	(Australia) Ian Stanley	215	−1	1 stroke	(Japan) Akio Toyoda	Twin Waters Golf Club	
1997	(Australia) Terry Gale	216		Playoff (Note: Gale won with a par at the first extra hole.)	(Australia) Bob Shaw	Twin Waters Golf Club	
1996	(United States) Lee Trevino	282	−6	5 strokes	(Australia) Terry Gale	Gold Creek Country Club	
1995	(Australia) Bill Dunk	281		2 strokes	(Australia) Peter Headland	Rich River Golf Club	
1994	(Australia) Rick L'Estrange	281	−7	2 strokes	(Australia) Errol Hartvigsen	Rich River Golf Club	
1993	(Japan) Akio Toyoda	284		7 strokes	(Australia) Bill Dunk	Rich River Golf Club	
1992	(Japan) Akio Toyoda	288		9 strokes	(Australia) Bill Dunk (Australia) John Klatt	Rich River Golf Club	
1991	(Australia) John Davis	293	+5	1 stroke	(Australia) Darrell Welch	Rich River Golf Club	
1990	(Australia) Mike Kelly	291	+3	6 strokes	(Australia) Col Johnston	Rich River Golf Club	
1989	(Australia) Bill Dunk	282		12 strokes	(Australia) Peter Thomson	Rich River Golf Club	
1988	(United States) Jerry Stolhand	286		7 strokes	(Australia) Ian Alexander	Rich River Golf Club	
1987	(United States) Orville Moody	281	−7	10 strokes	(Australia) Harry Berwick	Rich River Golf Club	
1986	(United States) Orville Moody	276	−12	1 stroke	(Australia) Peter Thomson	Rich River Golf Club	
