= Kurt Cox =

American professional golfer (1947–2018)

Personal information
- Nationality: United States
- Born: June 24, 1947 San Antonio, Texas
- Died: February 1, 2018 (aged 70) San Antonio, Texas

Career
- Sport: Golf
- Turned professional: 1972
- Former tours: Asian Golf Circuit; Senior PGA Tour; European Seniors Tour
- Professional wins: 6

Best results in major championships
- Masters Tournament: DNP
- PGA Championship: DNP
- U.S. Open: CUT: 1973, 1974, 1975
- The Open Championship: CUT: 1980

Kurt Cox (June 24, 1947 – February 1, 2018) was an American professional golfer. Though he only briefly played on the PGA Tour, he had much success on the Asia Golf Circuit in the 1980s. He won three tournaments on the circuit in the early 1980s and finished runner-up in the final circuit standings in 1980.

== Amateur career ==
Cox was born in San Antonio, Texas. He attended Alamo Heights High School where he was a standout golfer. Cox graduated from Alamo Heights in 1966 and attended Odessa Junior College and then Trinity University. Cox was one of the top amateurs in the nation during this period. During his youth, Cox was also known for the demanding presence of his father. Even Cox's competitors would often suggest that he be easier on his son.

Cox had much success at a number of notable amateur and professional events during his amateur career. At the second round of the 1970 U.S. Amateur he shot a 65 at Portland's Waverly Country Club to tie for the lowest 18-hole score in the history of the event. Shortly thereafter, Cox won the Greater San Antonio Men's Championship in 1971 and 1972 while still an amateur. Shortly before turning professional, Cox played in the Porter Cup. Among the 81 competitors Cox finished in a tie for 21st, defeating several future PGA Tour pros.

== Professional career ==
Cox turned professional in 1972. The first PGA Tour tournament he played in was his hometown event, the Texas Open, played in San Antonio. Cox opened with 71-69 to make the cut. He followed with rounds of 74−79, however, to finish in 69th place. The following year he qualified for his first major championship, the 1973 U.S. Open at Oakmont Country Club. Cox shot 82-79 to miss the cut by a wide margin. The following year he again qualified for the U.S. Open but again missed the cut by a wide margin. In 1975 he qualified for the U.S. Open for the final time. He shot a 74 in the first round at Medinah Country Club to put himself inside the cut line. However, he shot a second round 78 he miss the cut. Cox would continue to play in some regular PGA Tour events for the remainder of the decade but never joined tour during the period. He attempted to qualify for the PGA Tour once in the 1970s but was not successful.

Rather, Cox played events in the Asia-Pacific region for most of his regular career as a touring professional. Cox originally found some success on the PGA Tour of Australia. In December 1977, he placed high in the New Zealand Open. In the final round, he shot a 70 (−1), the second best round of the day, to finish in fifth place at 293 (+9), three back of fellow American Bob Byman. The following year, he played well at West Lakes Classic held at The Grange Club in Adelaide, Australia. Cox was in a tie for 21st entering the final round. He shot a final round 68 to move up to a tie for fifth. In March 1979 he had success at the Malaysian Dunlop Masters. Cox shot a final round 71 (−1) to finish in a tie for third, three back of champion Walter Godfrey.

Cox had a very successful 1980 season on the Asia Golf Circuit. In March 1980, Cox won the Indian Open, held at Royal Calcutta Golf Club, where he finished four strokes clear of Taiwan's Liao Kuo-chih and Burma's Mya Aye. Two weeks later he played well at the Singapore Open. Cox shot a third round 67 (−4), the round of the day, to place himself one back of Hsu Sheng-san and tie Aye for second. During the final round he birdied the final hole to defeat Hsu and Aye by a shot. The victory put him atop the Asia Golf Circuit's Order of Merit standings. At the end of the season, he played well during the first round at the Dunlop International Open, opening with a 67 and putting him two back of the lead. He finished in a tie for 4th place. He finished the 1980 season as runner-up in the final standings, behind Taiwan's Lu Hsi-chuen. His good play in Asia qualified him for the 1980 Open Championship. Cox opened with rounds of 77-71 to make the halfway cut. However, in the third round he shot 77 to miss the third round cut. Later in the year he played in two regular PGA Tour events, making the cut in both.

In March 1982 Cox played well at the Hong Kong Open. In the third round he shot a 70 (E) to match the aggregate totals of Tom Sieckmann and Terry Gale to tie for the lead. Sunday was a back and forth day as the three players traded the lead throughout the final round. On the final green, Cox had a chance to win but missed a two-yard birdie putt, forcing a sudden-death playoff. Gale bogeyed the first hole of the playoff and dropped out. Sieckmann then bogeyed the next playoff hole, played on the 16th hole, allowing Cox to make par and claim the win. The following year, as defending champion, he finished in a tie for third place, behind only champion Greg Norman and Englishman Mark James.

In December 1983 Cox played the PGA Tour Qualifying Tournament at TPC Sawgrass. Cox shot 445 over the course of the six round tournament, finishing in a tie for 51st, earning his PGA Tour card by a shot. Cox played in only two PGA Tour tournaments in 1984, however. The first tournament he played was the Buick Open in August. He finished at 286 (−2), in a tie for 62nd. Two months later he played in his second and final event of the year, the Texas Open. He opened with a 65 (−5) to put himself near the lead. However, he played far worse the next three days, never breaking 74 (+4), and finished in a tie for 70th at 290 (+10). This was the last time he played in his home state's open.

Cox played in his final PGA Tour event two years later. In the late 1980s Cox largely stopped playing in Asia. During this era Cox opened two golf-related businesses in San Antonio, the Golf Center and the Golf Discount Barn.

In his career Cox recorded an ace at the par-4 17th hole at Brackenridge Park Golf Course in his hometown of San Antonio.

=== Senior career ===
In 1997 Cox turned 50. He quickly played in two events on the Senior PGA Tour. Later in the year he attempted to qualify for the 1998 season. He was successful, finishing in a tie for fifth at Senior PGA Tour Qualifying School. Cox won nearly $200,000 in 1998 but did not record any high finishes. He lost his card. He attempted to regain his card at Q-School but was unsuccessful. The following year, he again attempted to earn membership but was again unsuccessful.

Cox turned to Europe after these experiences. He performed successfully at European Seniors Tour Qualifying School before the 2000 season. In 16 events, he recorded three top-10s and finished in the top 30 of the Order of Merit. His best finish was at the Belfry PGA Seniors Championship, finishing in a tie for third with Geoff Parslow, one out of a playoff. In 2001, Cox returned to America. He recorded his best ever finish on tour, a solo fifth at the Instinet Classic, but without any other top finishes he did not maintain playing privileges. He once again attempted to regain status at qualifying school but was not successful. Cox would not play full-time on the Senior PGA Tour again.

Cox did not play full-time on the senior circuits for multiple years. During this intermittent phase, he won the Taiwan Seniors Open over Isao Aoki. In 2005, he was shot a final round 67 (−4) at qualifying school to earn his European Seniors Tour card for the final time. He played in 10 events and did not record anything better than a 56th place finish and lost his card. Cox did not play full-time as a touring professional after the 2006 season.

== Personal life ==
Cox met his future wife a club pro shop in Kuala Lumpur, Malaysia during his experiences on the Asian circuit. They married in 1988. They had a daughter named Aaleen. Cox also had a brother named Rick.

Cox died of Hodgkin's lymphoma on February 1, 2018. His obituary was featured in several Texas newspapers and golf publications.

== Professional wins (6) ==
=== Asia Golf Circuit wins (3) ===
No.	Date	Tournament	Winning score	Margin of victory	Runners-up
1	Mar 16, 1980	Indian Open	−6 (72-68-71-75=286)	4 strokes	(Myanmar) Mya Aye, (Taiwan) Liao Kuo-chih
2	Mar 30, 1980	Singapore Open	−8 (69-70-67-70=276)	1 stroke	(Myanmar) Mya Aye, (Taiwan) Hsu Sheng-san
2	Feb 28, 1982	Cathay Pacific Hong Kong Open	−4 (68-68-70-70=276)	Playoff	(Australia) Terry Gale, (United States) Tom Sieckmann

Asia Golf Circuit playoff record (1–0)

No.	Year	Tournament	Opponents	Result
1	1982	Cathay Pacific Hong Kong Open	(Australia) Terry Gale, (United States) Tom Sieckmann	Won with par on fourth extra hole Gale eliminated by par on first hole

=== Other wins (3) ===
- 1971 Greater San Antonio Men's Championship
- 1972 Greater San Antonio Men's Championship
- Taiwan Seniors Open

== Results in major championships ==
Tournament	1973	1974	1975	1976	1977	1978	1979	1980
U.S. Open	CUT	CUT	CUT					
The Open Championship								CUT

Did not play

CUT = missed the half-way cut (3rd round cut in 1980 Open Championship)
Note: Cox never played in the Masters Tournament or the PGA Championship.

== See also ==
- 1983 PGA Tour Qualifying School graduates
