= Bob Shearer =

Australian golfer and golf course architect (1948–2022)

Bob Shearer OAM
Personal information
- Full name: Robert Alan Shearer
- Nationality: Australia
- Born: 25 May 1948 Melbourne, Victoria, Australia
- Died: 9 January 2022 (aged 73)
- Height: 1.83 m (6 ft 0 in)
- Weight: 84 kg (185 lb; 13.2 st)
- Spouse: Kathie Shearer
- Children: 2

Career
- Sport: Golf
- Turned professional: 1971
- Former tours: PGA Tour of Australasia; European Tour; PGA Tour; European Senior Tour
- Professional wins: 27

Number of wins by tour
- PGA Tour: 1
- European Tour: 2
- PGA Tour of Australasia: 16
- European Senior Tour: 4
- Other: 4

Best results in major championships
- Masters Tournament: T35: 1977
- PGA Championship: T26: 1978
- U.S. Open: T16: 1978
- The Open Championship: T7: 1978

Achievements and awards
- PGA Tour of Australia Order of Merit winner: 1974, 1977, 1981, 1982

Robert Alan Shearer OAM (25 May 1948 – 9 January 2022) was an Australian professional golfer and golf course architect.

== Early life and amateur career ==
Shearer was born in Melbourne, Victoria. He won the 1969 Australian Amateur, having been a joint medalist the previous year.

== Professional career ==
Shearer turned professional in early 1971. He won the PGA Tour of Australia Order of Merit four times: 1974, 1977, 1981, 1982. He spent five years on the European Tour and then nine on the PGA Tour. His career year was 1982 when he won the Australian Open and his sole PGA Tour event, the Tallahassee Open. He had 18 top-10 finishes in PGA Tour events. His best finish in a major championship was a T-7 at the 1978 Open Championship.

Later he split his time between his golf course design work and the European Senior Tour.

== Death ==
Shearer died from a heart attack on 9 January 2022, at the age of 73.

== Amateur wins ==
- 1969 Australian Amateur

== Professional wins (27) ==
=== PGA Tour wins (1) ===
No.	Date	Tournament	Winning score	Margin of victory	Runners-up
1	18 Apr 1982	Tallahassee Open	−16 (69-69-68-66=272)	1 stroke	(United States) Hal Sutton, (Zimbabwe) Denis Watson

PGA Tour playoff record (0–1)

No.	Year	Tournament	Opponent	Result
1	1982	Michelob-Houston Open	(United States) Ed Sneed	Lost to birdie on first extra hole

=== European Tour wins (2) ===
No.	Date	Tournament	Winning score	Margin of victory	Runner(s)-up
1	26 Apr 1975	Madrid Open	−9 (68-67=135)	3 strokes	(South Africa) Dale Hayes, (Scotland) Norman Wood
2	10 May 1975	Piccadilly Medal	−3 (70)	19 holes	(South Africa) Andries Oosthuizen

European Tour playoff record (0–1)

No.	Year	Tournament	Opponent	Result
1	1974	Benson & Hedges Festival of Golf	(Belgium) Philippe Toussaint	Lost to par on first extra hole

=== PGA Tour of Australia wins (16) ===
No.	Date	Tournament	Winning score	Margin of victory	Runner(s)-up
1	20 Jan 1974	Coca-Cola Lakes Open	+5 (74-75-72-76=297)	Playoff	(Australia) Ted Ball, (Australia) Paul Murray
2	3 Feb 1974	Tasmanian Open	−7 (67-70-73-71=281)	Playoff	(Australia) Ted Ball
3	10 Nov 1974	Chrysler Classic	−1 (65-74-70-74=283)	9 strokes	(Australia) Bruce Devlin
4	10 Nov 1975	West Lakes Classic	−2 (73-70-69-70=282)	Playoff	(Australia) Mike Cahill
5	7 Nov 1976	Chrysler Classic (2)	−3 (72-69-72-68=281)	Playoff	(Australia) Stewart Ginn
6	30 Oct 1977	CBA West Lakes Classic (2)	−13 (67-69-68-67=271)	6 strokes	(Australia) David Good
7	27 Nov 1977	Colgate Champion of Champions	−7 (66-71-72-72=281)	1 stroke	(England) Maurice Bembridge, (United States) John Benda, (United States) Curtis Strange, (Australia) Jack Newton
8	19 Oct 1980	Tooth Gold Coast Classic	−9 (70-70-70-69=279)	1 stroke	(United States) Don January, (United States) Art Russell, (Australia) Bob Shaw, (Australia) Chris Tickner
9	6 Dec 1981	Air New Zealand Shell Open	−15 (63-66-67-69=265)	8 strokes	(Australia) Graham Marsh
10	13 Dec 1981	New Zealand BP Open	−3 (74-67-72-72=285)	3 strokes	(Australia) Terry Gale
11	24 Oct 1982	New South Wales Open	−12 (71-66-66-69=272)	1 stroke	(Australia) Graham Marsh
12	21 Nov 1982	Australian Open	−1 (75-70-72-70=287)	4 strokes	(United States) Jack Nicklaus, (United States) Payne Stewart
13	13 Feb 1983	Victorian Open	−6 (73-71-68-70=282)	1 stroke	(Australia) Greg Norman
14	6 Nov 1983	Yakka Australian PGA Championship	E (72-76-69-71=288)	2 strokes	(Australia) Ossie Moore
15	7 Oct 1984	Ford Dealers South Australian Open	−2 (73-70-75-68=286)	1 stroke	(Australia) Terry Gale
16	2 Mar 1986	Rich River Classic	−17 (64-68-66-69=267)	8 strokes	(Australia) Ian Stanley

PGA Tour of Australia playoff record (4–0)

No.	Year	Tournament	Opponent(s)	Result
1	1974	Coca-Cola Lakes Open	(Australia) Ted Ball, (Australia) Paul Murray	Won with birdie on first extra hole
2	1974	Tasmanian Open	(Australia) Ted Ball	
3	1975	West Lakes Classic	(Australia) Mike Cahill	Won with par on third extra hole
4	1976	Chrysler Classic	(Australia) Stewart Ginn	Won with birdie on first extra hole

=== New Zealand Golf Circuit wins (2) ===
No.	Date	Tournament	Winning score	Margin of victory	Runner(s)-up
1	21 Nov 1976	New Zealand Airlines Classic	−21 (72-64-68-67=271)	9 strokes	(United States) Bill Brask, (New Zealand) John Lister
2	10 Dec 1978	New Zealand Open	−3 (71-67-72-67=277)	1 stroke	(Scotland) Brian Barnes

=== Other Australasian wins (2) ===
- 1983 ABE Holdings–Jack Newton Classic (incorporating the New South Wales PGA Championship)
- 1985 South West Open

=== European Seniors Tour wins (4) ===
No.	Date	Tournament	Winning score	Margin of victory	Runner(s)-up
1	7 Jun 1998	Jersey Seniors Open	−5 (71-73-67=211)	2 strokes	(England) Tony Jacklin
2	31 May 1999	Philips PFA Golf Classic	−12 (70-67-67=204)	1 stroke	(United States) Jim Delich, (Australia) Terry Gale
3	8 Aug 1999	Bad Ragaz PGA Seniors Open	−12 (67-63-68=198)	3 strokes	(United States) David Oakley
4	9 Sep 2001	STC Bovis Lend Lease European Invitational	−8 (70-71-67=208)	1 stroke	(Australia) Noel Ratcliffe

European Senior Tour playoff record (0–1)

No.	Year	Tournament	Opponent	Result
1	2000	Beko Classic	(Wales) Brian Huggett	Lost to par on first extra hole

== Results in major championships ==
Tournament	1972	1973	1974	1975	1976	1977	1978	1979
Masters Tournament					T39	T35		WD
U.S. Open							T16	CUT
The Open Championship	T31		T59	T32	T21	T15	T7	CUT
PGA Championship							T26	

Tournament	1980	1981	1982	1983	1984	1985
Masters Tournament				48		
U.S. Open			T49	T50		
The Open Championship	T51		T42	CUT		T35
PGA Championship			WD	T36		

Top 10
Did not play

CUT = missed the half-way cut
WD = withdrew
"T" indicates a tie for a place

== Team appearances ==
Amateur

- Australian Men's Interstate Teams Matches (representing Victoria): 1970

Professional

- World Cup (representing Australia): 1975, 1976

== See also ==
- Spring 1976 PGA Tour Qualifying School graduates
