= Illawarra Open =

Golf tournament

The Illawarra Open was a professional golf tournament played in the Illawarra area of New South Wales, Australia. It was played between 1978 and 1981. 1978 and 1979 events had prize money of A$20,000. The 1981 event was played over 36 holes with reduced prize money of A$10,000 and was not a PGA Tour of Australia Order of Merit event. The 1982 event had prize money of A$25,000.

The 1978 tournament was planned as a 72-hole event. 18 holes were played on the Thursday and Friday but heavy rain at the weekend caused the tournament to be reduced to 36 holes.

== Winners ==
Year	Winner	Country	Venue	Score	To par	Margin of victory	Runner(s)-up	Ref
Tooth's Illawarra Open
1982	Bob Shaw	Australia	Port Kembla	277	−11	1 stroke	(Australia) Colin Bishop	
1981	George Serhan	Australia	Port Kembla	142	−2	Playoff	(Australia) John Clifford (Australia) Garry Doolan	
Illawarra Open
1979	Mike Ferguson	Australia	The Grange	288	E	1 stroke	(Australia) Tom Linskey (Australia) Chris Tickner	
1978	Bill Dunk	Australia	Wollongong	135	−5	1 stroke	(Australia) Colin McGregor	
