= Tom Sieckmann =

American golfer

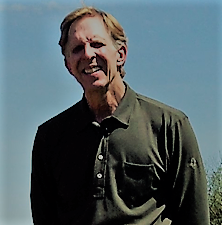

Personal information
- Full name: Thomas Edward Sieckmann
- Nationality: United States
- Born: January 14, 1955 (age 71) York, Nebraska, U.S.
- Height: 6 ft 5 in (1.96 m)
- Weight: 205 lb (93 kg; 14.6 st)
- Children: Lauren, Alex

Career
- Sport: Golf
- College: Oklahoma State University
- Turned professional: 1977
- Former tour: PGA Tour
- Professional wins: 8

Number of wins by tour
- PGA Tour: 1
- Other: 7

Best results in major championships
- Masters Tournament: CUT: 1989, 1991
- PGA Championship: T52: 1991
- U.S. Open: T8: 1990
- The Open Championship: DNP

Thomas Edward Sieckmann (born January 14, 1955) is an American professional golfer who has played on the PGA Tour.

== Early life and amateur career ==
Sieckmann was born in York, Nebraska. He won several amateur tournaments in his home state while growing up, and received the 1974 Nebraska Golf Association's Amateur of the Year award. Sieckmann attended Oklahoma State University, and was a member of the golf team. He turned professional in 1977.

== Professional career ==
Sieckmann had a 17-year career on the PGA Tour highlighted by a win at the 1988 Anheuser-Busch Golf Classic. He had a top 10 finish at the 1990 U.S. Open. He spent a significant amount of time playing overseas during his regular career years and won several tournaments. In his late forties, Sieckmann played some on the Nationwide Tour. His career earnings total in excess of $1.3 million.

In 1994, Sieckmann along with two other partners, developed Shadow Ridge Country Club. One year later he retired from the tour devoting all of his time to be the President of the General Partner. In 1999, Sieckmann sold his interest in Shadow Ridge and went to work for Dave Pelz Golf. He was Director of Instruction for Dave Pelz Golf for 10 years and has since worked primarily as a teaching professional. In 1988 Sieckmann founded Creative Golf, Inc. a company that primarily developed and organized the Mutual of Omaha Pro-Am. In 2005, he opened Sieckmann Golf Labs, a golf performance and teaching center in southwest Omaha, but sold his teaching business to Omaha Country Club.

== Awards and honors ==
In 1974, Sieckmann was awarded Nebraska Golf Association's Amateur of the Year

== Amateur wins ==
- 1970 Nebraska Junior Amateur Championship
- 1974 Nebraska Amateur Championship, Nebraska Match-Play Championship
- 1976 Nebraska Amateur Championship

== Professional wins (8) ==
=== PGA Tour wins (1) ===
No.	Date	Tournament	Winning score	Margin of victory	Runner-up
1	Jul 10, 1988	Anheuser-Busch Golf Classic	−14 (69-66-66-69=270)	Playoff	(United States) Mark Wiebe

PGA Tour playoff record (1–0)

No.	Year	Tournament	Opponent	Result
1	1988	Anheuser-Busch Golf Classic	(United States) Mark Wiebe	Won with par on second extra hole

=== Asia Golf Circuit wins (3) ===
No.	Date	Tournament	Winning score	Margin of victory	Runner(s)-up
1	Feb 22, 1981	Philippine Open	−1 (70-72-75-70=287)	4 strokes	(Taiwan) Lu Hsi-chuen
2	Mar 8, 1981	Thailand Open	−7 (69-70-70-72=281)	3 strokes	(United States) Gaylord Burrows, (Japan) Yutaka Hagawa, (United States) Payne Stewart
3	Mar 25, 1984	Singapore Open	−10 (66-71-67-70=274)	2 strokes	(Australia) Terry Gale, (Myanmar) Kyi Hla Han, (United States) Bill Israelson

Asia Golf Circuit playoff record (0–1)

No.	Year	Tournament	Opponents	Result
1	1982	Cathay Pacific Hong Kong Open	(United States) Kurt Cox, (Australia) Terry Gale	Cox won with par on fourth extra hole Gale eliminated by par on first hole

=== Other wins (4) ===
- 1980 Waterloo Open Golf Classic
- 1981 Brazil Open
- 1982 Rolex Open (Switzerland)
- 1992 Mexican Open

== Results in major championships ==
Tournament	1979	1980	1981	1982	1983	1984	1985	1986	1987	1988	1989	1990	1991	1992
Masters Tournament											CUT		CUT	
U.S. Open	CUT			T56		CUT	T23	CUT			T51	T8	T19	CUT
PGA Championship										CUT			T52	

Note: Sieckmann never played in The Open Championship.

Top 10
Did not play

CUT = missed the half-way cut
"T" = tied

== See also ==
- 1984 PGA Tour Qualifying School graduates
- 1985 PGA Tour Qualifying School graduates
- 1987 PGA Tour Qualifying School graduates
