= Rich River Classic =

Tournament information
- Location: Moama, Australia
- Established: 1986
- Course: Rich River Golf Club
- Par: 72
- Tour: PGA Tour of Australia
- Format: Stroke play
- Prize fund: A$75,000
- Month played: February
- Final year: 1987

Tournament record score
- Aggregate: 267 Bob Shearer (1986)
- To par: −17 as above

Final champion
- (Australia) Peter Senior
- Location in Australia Location in New South Wales

The Rich River Classic was a golf tournament held in Australia in 1986 and 1987 at Rich River Golf Club, Moama, NSW. The event was played concurrently with the Australian PGA Seniors' Championship. The event was discontinued after the ESP Open was allocated the dates on the professional tournament calendar in 1988, and a new tournament for trainees was created to play alongside the seniors championship.

== Winners ==
Year	Winner	Score	To par	Margin of victory	Runner-up	Winner's share (A$)	Ref.
1987	(Australia) Peter Senior	273	−15	2 strokes	(Australia) Mike Ferguson	13,500	
1986	(Australia) Bob Shearer	267	−17	8 strokes	(Australia) Ian Stanley	12,000	
