= Gold Coast Classic =

Golf tournament

The Gold Coast Classic was a professional golf tournament played at Coolangatta & Tweed Heads Golf Club in northern New South Wales, Australia. It was held from 1978 to 1983. From 1979 to 1983 it was sponsored by Tooth and Co., a beer brewery, initially under their name but from 1982 under the name Resch's Pilsner.

There was a playoff in the inaugural event. Four holes of a sudden-death playoff were played on the Sunday evening before darkness forced a suspension. Played resumed at 9 am the following day. Mike Cahill won at the seventh extra hole, making a birdie 4.

== Winners ==
Year	Winner	Country	Score	To par	Margin of victory	Runner(s)-up	Ref
Resch's Pilsner Tweed Classic
1983	Graham Marsh	Australia	276	−12	1 stroke	(Australia) Terry Gale	
1982	Payne Stewart	United States	279	−9	2 strokes	(Myanmar) Kyi Hla Han	
Tooth Gold Coast Classic
1981	Gary Player	South Africa	275	−13	4 strokes	(Australia) Bob Shearer	
1980	Bob Shearer	Australia	279	−9	1 stroke	(United States) Don January (United States) Art Russell (Australia) Bob Shaw (Australia) Chris Tickner	
Tooth's Gold Coast – Tweed Classic
1979	Mike Ferguson	Australia	281	−7	Playoff	(Australia) Stewart Ginn	
Golden Gate Classic
1978	Mike Cahill	Australia	283	−5	Playoff	(Australia) Vaughan Somers	
