= 1986 PGA Tour of Australia =

Golf tour season

1986 PGA Tour of Australia season
- Duration: 28 November 1985 – 23 November 1986
- Number of official events: 17
- Most wins: (Australia) Greg Norman (4)
- Order of Merit: (Australia) Greg Norman

The 1986 PGA Tour of Australia was the 15th season on the PGA Tour of Australia, the main professional golf tour in Australia since it was formed in 1973.

== Schedule ==
The following table lists official events during the 1986 season.

Date	Tournament	Location	Purse (A$)	Winner (Note: The number in brackets after each winner's name is the number of PGA Tour of Australia events they had won up to and including that tournament. This information is only shown for PGA Tour of Australia members.)	OWGR points	Notes
1 Dec	Air New Zealand Shell Open	New Zealand	NZ$140,000	(United States) D. A. Weibring (n/a)	n/a	
8 Dec	New Zealand Open	New Zealand	NZ$100,000	(United States) Corey Pavin (n/a)	n/a	
31 Dec	Nissan-Mobil New Zealand PGA Championship	New Zealand	NZ$75,000	(New Zealand) Frank Nobilo (2)	n/a	
2 Feb	Foster's Tasmanian Open	Tasmania	50,000	(Australia) Stewart Ginn (8)	10	
9 Feb	Robert Boyd Transport Victorian Open	Victoria	100,000	(Australia) Ossie Moore (9)	20	
16 Feb	Robert Boyd Transport Australian Match Play Championship	Victoria	60,000	(Australia) Peter Fowler (3)	10	New tournament
23 Feb	Australian Masters	Victoria	275,000	(United States) Mark O'Meara (n/a)	26	
2 Mar	Rich River Classic	New South Wales	70,000	(Australia) Bob Shearer (16)	10	New tournament
18 May	Halls Head Estates-Nissan Nedlands Masters	Western Australia	50,000	(Australia) Lyndsay Stephen (2)	10	
5 Oct	Fourex Queensland PGA Championship	Queensland	100,000	(Australia) Ossie Moore (2)	10	
12 Oct	Stefan Queensland Open	Queensland	100,000	(Australia) Greg Norman (17)	12	
19 Oct	National Panasonic New South Wales Open	New South Wales	125,000	(Australia) Greg Norman (18)	20	
25 Oct	West End Jubilee South Australian Open	South Australia	100,000	(Australia) Greg Norman (19)	12	
2 Nov	Toshiba Australian PGA Championship	New South Wales	180,000	(Australia) Mike Harwood (1)	20	
9 Nov	Black Magic Victorian PGA Championship	Victoria	100,000	(Australia) Wayne Smith (1)	10	
16 Nov	National Panasonic Australian Open	Victoria	275,000	(Australia) Rodger Davis (5)	40	
23 Nov	National Panasonic Western Australian Open	Western Australia	100,000	(Australia) Greg Norman (20)	16	

== Order of Merit ==
The Order of Merit was based on prize money won during the season, calculated in Australian dollars.

Position	Player	Prize money (A$)
1	(Australia) Greg Norman	111,211
2	(Australia) Rodger Davis	84,036
3	(Australia) Ossie Moore	61,059
4	(Australia) Bob Shearer	58,935
5	(Australia) Ian Baker-Finch	58,346
