= Acom Doubles =

Tournament information
- Location: Nagara, Chiba, Japan
- Established: 1983
- Course: Chiba Springs Country Club
- Par: 72
- Tour: Japan Golf Tour
- Format: Better ball (pairs) stroke play
- Final year: 1989

Tournament record score
- Aggregate: 255 Kinya Aoyagi and Toshiaki Sudo (1989)
- To par: −33 as above

Final champion
- (Japan) Kinya Aoyagi and (Japan) Toshiaki Sudo
- Location in Japan Location in the Chiba Prefecture

The Acom Doubles, also known as the Acom Team Championship, was a professional golf tournament that was held in Japan from 1983 to 1989. A pairs event, it was held on the Tashiro Course at Shigaraki Country Club near Kōka in Shiga Prefecture for five years before moving to Chiba Springs Country Club near Nagara in Chiba Prefecture. It was an event on the Japan Golf Tour in its first year.

From 1990, Acom sponsored an individual tournament, the Acom International.

== Tournament hosts ==
Year(s)	Host course	Location
1988–1989	Chiba Springs Country Club	Nagara, Chiba
1983–1987	Shigaraki Country Club (Tashiro Course)	Kōka, Shiga

== Winners ==
Year	Winner	Score	To par	Margin of victory	Runner(s)-up	Ref.
Acom Team Championship
1989	(Japan) Kinya Aoyagi and (Japan) Toshiaki Sudo	255	−33	Playoff (Note: Sudo and Aoyagi won with a par on the second hole of a sudden-death playoff.)	(Australia) Roger Mackay and (Australia) Wayne Smith	
1988	(United States) Bob Gilder and (United States) Doug Tewell	256	−32	1 stroke	(Japan) Takanori Hiraishi and (Japan) Masanobu Kimura	
1987	(Japan) Tomohiro Maruyama and (Japan) Nobuo Serizawa					
1986	(Japan) Satoshi Higashi and (Japan) Hajime Meshiai	257	−31	1 stroke	(Australia) Mike Ferguson and (Australia) Brian Jones (Japan) Futoshi Irino and (Japan) Kazushige Kono (Japan) Saburo Fujiki and (Japan) Yoshimi Niizeki (Japan) Kunio Hihama and (Japan) Kenjiro Iwama	
1985	(Australia) Mike Ferguson and (Australia) Brian Jones	263	−25	1 stroke		
1984	(Japan) Isao Isozaki and (Japan) Kosaku Shimada	256	−32	2 strokes	(United States) David Ishii and (Japan) Nobumitsu Yuhara	
Acom Doubles
1983	(Taiwan) Lu Hsi-chuen and (Taiwan) Lu Liang-Huan	261	−27	Playoff (Note: Lu and Lu won with a birdie on the third hole of a sudden-death playoff.)	(Japan) Hajime Meshiai and (Japan) Masashi Ozaki	
