= Brisbane Water Tournament =

Golf tournament

The Brisbane Water Tournament was a golf tournament played in Brisbane Water area on the Central Coast of New South Wales, Australia in the 1968 and 1969. The event was organised by the Brisbane Water District Golf Association and was unusual, in that a different course was used on each day. Prize money was A$4,000 in both years.

The first event was played from 11 to 14 January 1968. It was planned to play at Everglades Country Club, Tuggerah Lakes Golf Club, Gosford Golf Club and Wyong Golf Club on successive days. 60 golfers competed. Col Johnston and Graeme Bell led after the first day with two-under-par rounds of 65. Bob Shaw led after two rounds with rounds of 67 and 72, three over par. The third round at Gosford was abandoned because of heavy rain and the final round was switched to Tuggerah Lakes with 27 holes planned for the final day. In the end only 18 holes were played on the final day, reducing the event to 54 holes. Shaw had a par round of 69 to win by a stroke from Alan Murray who finished with a 68.

The second event was played from 16 to 19 January 1969 with the same courses used. Maurice Bembridge and Peter Jackson led after the first day at Everglades with rounds of 63, four under par. Jackson led by four shots after the second day at Tuggerah Lakes after a second round 67. Jackson took a one-over-par 71 on the third day at Gosford and was joined in the lead by Bembridge who scored 67, both on 201. Jackson took a 78 on the final day at Wyong to drop out of contention. Bembridge took 73 but was passed by Bill Dunk who scored a four-under-par 69 to win by a stroke. Bembridge finished joint second with Alan Murray and Frank Phillips.

An event was planned for 19 to 22 February 1970. However, there was a dispute between the Australian Golf Union, who had agreed to the dates, and the Australian PGA who supported the Forbes Open which had been played on this week in previous years. Attempts were made to resolve the situation but the Brisbane Water District Golf Association decided to cancel the event.

== Winners ==
Year	Winner	Country	Score	To par	Margin of victory	Runner(s)-up	Ref
1968	Bob Shaw	Australia	208	+3	1 stroke	(Australia) Alan Murray	
1969	Bill Dunk	Australia	273	−6	1 stroke	(England) Maurice Bembridge (Australia) Alan Murray (Australia) Frank Phillips	
