= Frank Cahill =

Australian rules footballer

Personal information
- Born: 7 May 1922
- Died: 10 June 1982 (aged 60)
- Original team: Spotswood
- Height: 188 cm (6 ft 2 in)
- Weight: 82 kg (181 lb)

Playing career^{1}
Years	Club	Games (Goals)
1942–44	Footscray	21 (18)
1948–49	Carlton	23 (2)
Total		44 (20)
- ^{1} Playing statistics correct to the end of 1949.

Frank Cahill (born 7 May 1922 - 10 June 1982) is a former Australian rules footballer who played with Carlton and Footscray in the Victorian Football League (VFL).

== Personal life ==
Cahill was the father of Mike Cahill, a professional golfer.

In April 1982, Cahill went into the hospital. He died two months later.
