= Chrysler Classic =

Australian golf tournament

Tournament information
- Established: 1973
- Tour(s): PGA Tour of Australasia
- Format: Stroke play
- Final year: 1976

Final champion
- (Australia) Bob Shearer

The Chrysler Classic was a golf tournament held in Australia from 1973 to 1976. Prize money was A$50,000. Bob Shearer won the event twice in the four years it was held.

== Winners ==
Year	Winner	Country	Venue	Score	To par	Margin of victory	Runner-up	Winner's share (A$)	Ref
1976	Bob Shearer (2)	Australia	Royal Melbourne	281	−3	Playoff	(Australia) Stewart Ginn	10,000	
1975	Bill Dunk	Australia	Royal Melbourne	281	−3	1 stroke	(Australia) David Graham	10,000	
1974	Bob Shearer	Australia	Royal Melbourne	283	−1	9 strokes	(Australia) Bruce Devlin	10,000	
1973	Lee Trevino	United States	The Lakes	277	−15	4 strokes	(Australia) Stewart Ginn	10,000	

In 1976 Shearer won at the first extra hole.
