= Terry Gale =

Australian professional golfer (born 1946)

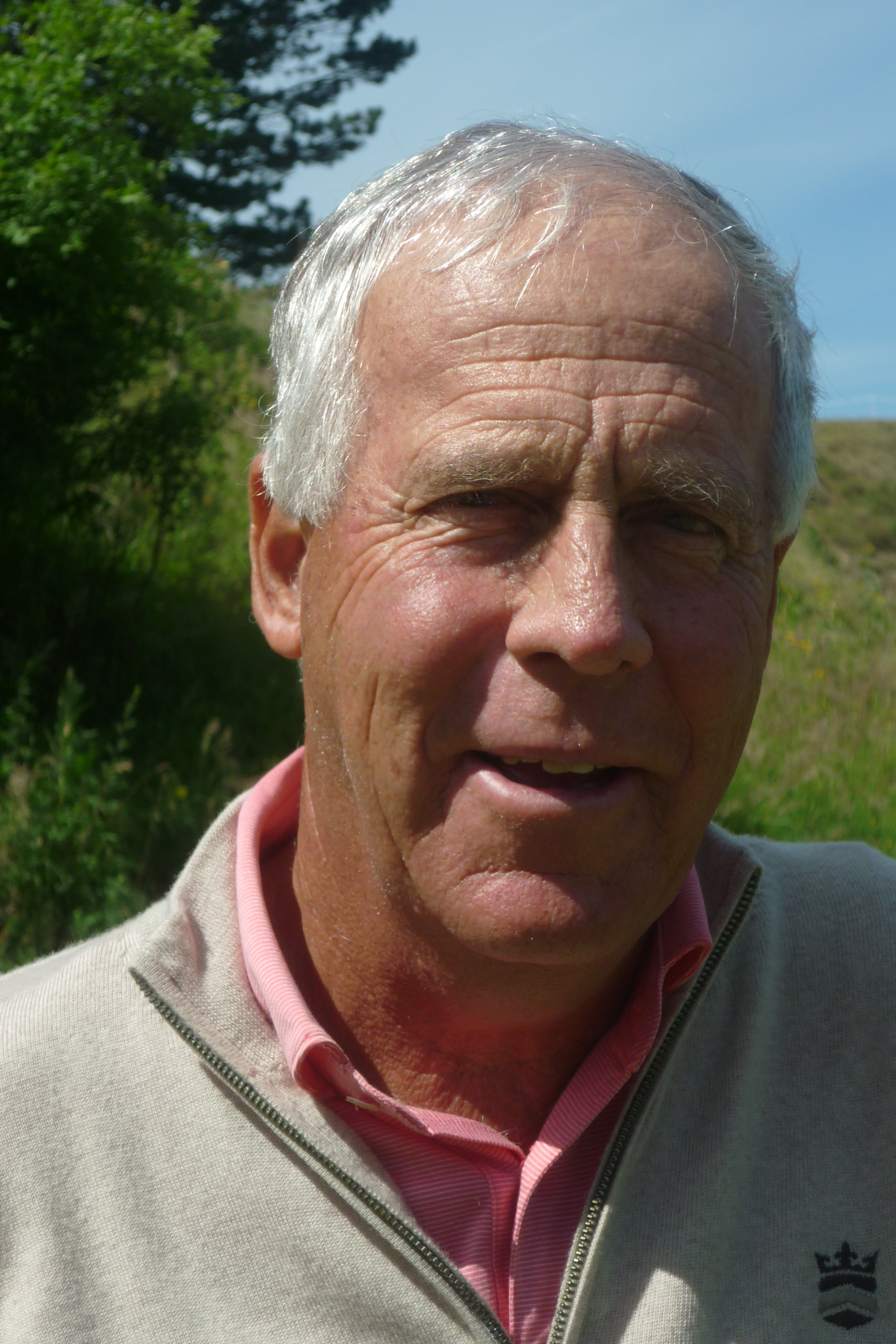

Personal information
- Full name: Terry R. Gale
- Nationality: Australia
- Born: 7 June 1946 (age 80) Yelbeni, Western Australia
- Height: 1.76 m (5 ft 9 in)
- Weight: 80 kg (176 lb; 12 st 8 lb)

Career
- Sport: Golf
- Turned professional: 1976
- Former tours: PGA of Japan Tour; Asia Golf Circuit; PGA Tour of Australasia; European Seniors Tour
- Professional wins: 43

Number of wins by tour
- Japan Golf Tour: 2
- PGA Tour of Australasia: 16
- European Senior Tour: 7
- Other: 18

Best results in major championships
- Masters Tournament: DNP
- PGA Championship: DNP
- U.S. Open: DNP
- The Open Championship: T13: 1979

Terry R. Gale (born 7 June 1946) is an Australian professional golfer.

== Early life and amateur career ==
In 1946, Gale was born in Yelbeni, Western Australia. Gale was also a talented cricketer in his youth, representing his state on occasion, although never at First Class level. Gale originally worked as a sheep farmer before transitioning to pro golf.

While working as a farmer, Gale had much success playing amateur golf. He won the Western Australian Amateur four times in his young adulthood. He also won the 1974 Australian Amateur. He also had success at professional events. He won his home state's open, the Western Australian Open, twice while an amateur. He also won the Nedlands Masters, another prominent professional event in Western Australia, three times during his amateur days.

== Professional career ==
In 1976, at a relatively advanced age of 30, Gale turned professional. In March 1977, Gale won his first event on the PGA Tour of Australia, the Forbes Open. He ultimately won 16 times on the Australian Tour. He also played extensively on the Japan Golf Tour and the Asia Golf Circuit during his career, winning on both circuits.

Once he turned 50, he joined the European Seniors Tour, where he won seven tournaments. His best season on that tour was 2003, when he finished third on the Order of Merit. He also played on the Japanese Seniors Tour.

Gale also worked as the second Chairman of the PGA Tour of Australasia.

== Personal life ==
Gale's son, Mark Gale was a professional Australian rules footballer.

== Amateur wins ==
- 1969 Western Australian Amateur
- 1972 Western Australian Amateur
- 1974 Australian Amateur, Western Australian Amateur
- 1975 Western Australian Amateur

== Professional wins (44) ==
=== PGA of Japan Tour wins (2) ===
No.	Date	Tournament	Winning score	Margin of victory	Runners-up
1	20 Jun 1982	Yomiuri Open	−16 (70-70-68-68=276)	3 strokes	(Japan) Masahiro Kuramoto, (Japan) Tsuneyuki Nakajima, (Japan) Namio Takasu, (Japan) Nobumitsu Yuhara
2	23 Apr 1989	Dunlop Open^{1}	−4 (73-74-68-69=284)	1 stroke	(Taiwan) Chen Tze-ming, (Australia) Peter Senior

^{1}Co-sanctioned by the Asia Golf Circuit

PGA of Japan Tour playoff record (0–1)

No.	Year	Tournament	Opponent	Result
1	1983	Japan Open Golf Championship	(Japan) Isao Aoki	Lost to par on second extra hole

=== Asia Golf Circuit wins (6) ===
No.	Date	Tournament	Winning score	Margin of victory	Runner(s)-up
1	26 Mar 1978	Singapore Open	−6 (68-70-72-68=278)	1 stroke	(Myanmar) Mya Aye
2	6 Mar 1983	Benson & Hedges Malaysian Open	−9 (67-71-71-70=279)	2 strokes	(United States) Jay Cudd
3	1 Apr 1984	Indonesia Open	−8 (70-70-71-69=280)	2 strokes	(Taiwan) Lu Chien-soon
4	10 Mar 1985	Benson & Hedges Malaysian Open (2)	−14 (68-64-69-69=270)	7 strokes	(Taiwan) Chen Tze-chung
5	8 Mar 1987	Benson & Hedges Malaysian Open (3)	−8 (66-75-70-69=280)	Playoff	(United States) Greg Twiggs
6	23 Apr 1989	Dunlop Open^{1}	−4 (73-74-68-69=284)	1 stroke	(Taiwan) Chen Tze-ming, (Australia) Peter Senior

^{1}Co-sanctioned by the PGA of Japan Tour

Asia Golf Circuit playoff record (1–1)

No.	Year	Tournament	Opponent(s)	Result
1	1982	Cathay Pacific Hong Kong Open	(United States) Kurt Cox, (United States) Tom Sieckmann	Cox won with par on fourth extra hole Gale eliminated by par on first hole
2	1987	Benson & Hedges Malaysian Open	(United States) Greg Twiggs	Won with birdie on first extra hole

=== PGA Tour of Australasia wins (16) ===
No.	Date	Tournament	Winning score	Margin of victory	Runner(s)-up
1	6 Mar 1977	Forbes Classic	−3 (285)	Playoff	(Australia) Bill Dunk
2	25 Mar 1979	Royal Fremantle Open	−8 (69-73-67-71=280)	1 stroke	(Australia) Ray Hore
3	5 Aug 1979	Nedlands Masters	−9 (69-68-71-71=279)	5 strokes	(Australia) Stewart Ginn
4	31 Aug 1980	Western Australian Open	−2 (71-74-69-72=286)	3 strokes	(Australia) Peter Randall
5	10 May 1981	Halls Head Western Open	−7 (69-69-67-76=281)	2 strokes	(Australia) Bob Shaw
6	17 May 1981	CIG Channel 9 Nedlands Masters (2)	−4 (70-69-70-71=280)	1 stroke	(Australia) Vaughan Somers
7	29 Nov 1981	New Zealand PGA Championship	−11 (66-67-68-68=269)	Playoff	(New Zealand) Bob Charles
8	23 May 1982	Town and Country Western Australian Open (2)	−13 (71-68-65-71=275)	Playoff	(Australia) Vaughan Somers
9	28 Nov 1982	New Zealand BP Open	−4 (75-66-74-69=284)	2 strokes	(New Zealand) Bob Charles
10	5 Dec 1982	Air New Zealand Shell Open	−7 (66-68-65-74=273)	Playoff	(Australia) Wayne Grady
11	23 Jan 1983	Ford Dealers South Australian Open	−7 (69-72-72-68=281)	1 stroke	(Australia) Wayne Grady
12	22 May 1983	Town and Country Western Australian Open (3)	−8 (70-68-68-74=280)	Playoff	(Australia) Jack Newton
13	29 May 1983	National Panasonic Nedlands Masters (3)	−20 (62-67-67-72=268)	3 strokes	(Australia) Wayne Grady
14	26 May 1985	Halls Head Estates Nedlands Masters (4)	−13 (72-66-66-71=275)	5 strokes	(Australia) Lyndsay Stephen
15	11 Dec 1988	Air New Zealand Shell Open (2)	−9 (69-69-68-65=271)	4 strokes	(United States) Hale Irwin, (Australia) Ossie Moore, (Australia) Jeff Woodland
16	1 Nov 1992	Pioneer Singapore PGA Championship	−8 (71-69-68=208)	Playoff	(Australia) Ken Trimble

PGA Tour of Australasia playoff record (6–0)

No.	Year	Tournament	Opponent	Result
1	1977	Forbes Classic	(Australia) Bill Dunk	Won with birdie on second extra hole
2	1981	New Zealand PGA Championship	(New Zealand) Bob Charles	Won with birdie on first extra hole
3	1982	Town and Country Western Australian Open	(Australia) Vaughan Somers	Won with par on first extra hole
4	1982	Air New Zealand Shell Open	(Australia) Wayne Grady	Won with birdie on second extra hole
5	1983	Town and Country Western Australian Open	(Australia) Jack Newton	Won with birdie on first extra hole
6	1992	Pioneer Singapore PGA Championship	(Australia) Ken Trimble	Won with par on first extra hole

=== Other wins (11) ===
- 1969 Nedlands Masters (as an amateur)
- 1970 Nedlands Masters (as an amateur)
- 1971 Nedlands Masters (as an amateur)
- 1972 Western Australian Open (as an amateur)
- 1975 Western Australian Open (as an amateur)
- 1976 Nedlands Masters
- 1979 Mandurah Classic
- 1980 Mandurah Classic
- 1981 Western Australia PGA Championship
- 1990 Western Australian Open
- 1992 Nedlands Masters

=== European Seniors Tour wins (7) ===
No.	Date	Tournament	Winning score	Margin of victory	Runner(s)-up
1	25 Aug 1996	The Belfry PGA Seniors Championship	−4 (72-70-72-70=284)	1 stroke	(England) Tommy Horton
2	7 Sep 2002	GIN Monte Carlo Invitational	−10 (62-67-68=197)	1 stroke	(England) Keith MacDonald
3	29 Mar 2003	Royal Westmoreland Barbados Open	−10 (70-64-72=206)	6 strokes	(United States) Jerry Bruner, (Australia) Brian Jones
4	5 Apr 2003	Tobago Plantations Seniors Classic	−13 (68-70-65=203)	3 strokes	(Scotland) John Chillas
5	31 Aug 2003	Charles Church Scottish Seniors Open	−11 (69-66-70=205)	2 strokes	(England) Nick Job, (New Zealand) Barry Vivian
6	16 May 2004	Bosch Italian Seniors Open	−5 (69-74-68=211)	1 stroke	(England) David J. Russell
7	14 Aug 2005	Bad Ragaz PGA Seniors Open	−11 (67-66-66=199)	2 strokes	(Argentina) Luis Carbonetti, (France) Géry Watine

European Seniors Tour playoff record (0–2)

No.	Year	Tournament	Opponent(s)	Result
1	1998	AIB Irish Seniors Open	(Republic of Ireland) Joe McDermott, (Australia) Noel Ratcliffe	McDermott won with birdie on fifth extra hole Ratcliffe eliminated by par on first hole
2	2004	Digicel Jamaica Classic	(Argentina) Luis Carbonetti	Lost to birdie on first extra hole

=== Other senior wins (2) ===
- 1997 Australian PGA Seniors Championship
- 2006 Australian PGA Seniors Championship

== Results in major championships ==
Tournament	1979	1980	1981	1982	1983	1984	1985	1986
The Open Championship	T13	CUT	T44	T42	T29	T28	CUT	CUT

Note: Gale only played in The Open Championship.
CUT = missed the half-way cut (3rd round cut in 1980 and 1985 Open Championships)
"T" = tied

== Team appearances ==
Amateur

- Eisenhower Trophy (representing Australia): 1970, 1972, 1974
- Commonwealth Tournament (representing Australia): 1971
- Sloan Morpeth Trophy (representing Australia): 1969 (winners)

Professional

- World Cup (representing Australia): 1983
- Alfred Dunhill Challenge (representing Australasia): 1995 (non-playing captain)

== See also ==
- List of golfers with most European Senior Tour wins
