= Coolangatta & Tweed Heads Golf Club =

Golf club in New South Wales, Australia

Club information
- Location: Tweed Heads, New South Wales
- Established: 1926
- Type: private

Coolangatta & Tweed Heads Golf Club is a club on Australia's east coast near the New South Wales/Queensland border. It is located in NSW at Tweed Heads South, New South Wales. It was formed in 1926. It has hosted several notable tournaments including the Queensland Open and Gold Coast Classic.

== History ==
On June 12, 1926, a group of golf enthusiasts met at Coolangatta Town Hall in Coolangatta, Queensland to advocate construction of a golf course. The following year a decision was made to create the course and in 1928 construction began. However, there were early environmental setbacks and a new site needed to be found. This was achieved in 1930 on a large parcel of land near the Tweed River at South Tweed Heads. Within two years the first nine holes were completed and the club opened on December 4, 1932. In 1951 the second nine holes were completed. In 1974 and 1981, two additional nine-hole sets were added to create two 18-hole championship courses known as the River course and West course. The entire club and courses' coverage is 101 hectares which takes in a large wildlife reserve.

The club has hosted a number of notable tournaments. On May 24, 1978, the club hosted its first Gold Coast Professional Gold Classic. It was an event on the PGA Tour of Australia and was held annually up to 1983. Notable champions included South African legend Gary Player, American Payne Stewart, and West Australian Graham Marsh. In 1986 the club hosted the Queensland Open which was won by the hot favourite, Queensland's multiple-major champion Greg Norman. It currently hosts the time-honoured Twin Towns Open, which has been the breeding ground for upcoming leading professionals.

== Club professionals ==
In 1954, the club appointed reigning Queensland Open champion Reginald Want as club professional. One of his trainees was Charlie Earp who went on to become club professional at Royal Queensland in Brisbane and who later became the coach of World No.1 Greg "The Shark" Norman. In January 1980 Victorian Geoff Parslow became the club professional.

== Tournaments hosted ==
- 2022 Women's NSW Open
- 2021 The Athena
- 1986 Queensland Open
- 1983 Gold Coast Classic
- 1982 Gold Coast Classic
- 1981 Gold Coast Classic
- 1980 Gold Coast Classic
- 1979 Gold Coast Classic
- 1978 Gold Coast Classic
