= Nedlands Masters =

The Nedlands Masters was a professional golf tournament in Australia, held at the Nedlands Golf Club in Nedlands, Perth, Western Australia. It was first played in 1947, again in 1950, and then annually from 1962. Like the Masters Tournament, the winner of the tournament was presented with a green jacket.

Though not always an official PGA Tour of Australasia event it was on the Order of Merit in the mid-1980s.

== Winners ==
Note: this list is incomplete

Year	Winner (Note: (a) – amateur)	Score	Ref
Nedlands Masters
2015	(Australia) Dale Clarke (a)	70 (Note: Tournament reduced to 18 holes due to bad weather.)	
2014	(Australia) Brody Ninyette	100 (Note: Tournament reduced to 27 holes due to bad weather.)	
2013	Tournament cancelled		
Handa Nedlands Masters
2012	(Australia) Scott Strange	202	
2011	(Australia) Daniel Fox	135	
Nedlands Masters
2010	(Australia) Stephen Leaney	135	
2009			
2008	(Australia) Stephen Dartnall		
2007	(Australia) Michael Long		
WA Open–Nedlands Masters (Note: From 2002 to 2006 the Nedlands Masters was incorporated into the Western Australian Open.)
2006	(Australia) Kim Felton		
2005	(Australia) Brett Rumford		
2004	(Australia) Stephen Leaney		
2003	(Australia) Kim Felton		
2002	(Australia) Stephen Leaney		
Nedlands Masters
2001	(Australia) Stephen Leaney		
2000	(Australia) Brendon Allanby		
1999	(Australia) Nick O'Hern		
1998	(Australia) Wayne Smith		
1997	(Australia) Ross Metherell		
1996			
1995	(Australia) Greg Chalmers		
1994	(Australia) Stuart Appleby		
1993	(Australia) Steven Conran		
1992	(Australia) Terry Gale	277	
1991	(Australia) Jeff Wagner		
Monro Interiors Nedlands Masters
1990	(United States) John Morse	275	
1989	(United States) Louis Brown	274	
Nedlands Masters
1988	(Australia) Brad King		
1987	(Australia) Jon Evans (a)		
Halls Head Estates-Nissan Nedlands Masters
1986	(Australia) Lyndsay Stephen	272	
Halls Head Estates Nedlands Masters
1985	(Australia) Terry Gale	275	
National Panasonic Nedlands Masters
1984	(Australia) Ossie Moore	275 (Note: Title decided following a playoff.)	
1983	(Australia) Terry Gale	268	
Channel 9 Nedlands Masters
1982	(Australia) Mike Cahill	279	
1981	(Australia) Terry Gale	280	
1980	(Australia) Chris Tickner	280	
Nedlands Masters
1979	(Australia) Terry Gale	279	
1978	(Australia) Rodger Davis		
1977	(Australia) Rodger Davis	277	
1976	(Australia) Terry Gale		
1975	Len Thomas		
1974	(Australia) Ross Metherell		
1973	Warren Baker (a)		
1972	Barry Fry		
1971	(Australia) Terry Gale (a)		
1970	(Australia) Terry Gale (a)		
1969	(Australia) Terry Gale (a)		
1968	(Australia) Dennis Parker		
1967	(Australia) Graham Marsh (a)		
1966	(Australia) Graham Marsh (a)		
1965	T Osborne		
1964	Dennis Bell (a)		
1963	Les Nicholls		
1962	Dennis Bell (a)		
1950	Neville Johnston		
1947	Les Nicholls		
