= Ossie Moore =

Australian golfer

Ossie Moore (born 6 July 1958) is an Australian professional golfer.

== Early life ==
Moore was born in Murwillumbah.

== Professional career ==
Moore played on the European Tour from 1984 to 1991. His best finish was second at the 1987 PLM Open. Moore also played on the PGA Tour of Australasia, winning the Order of Merit in 1985. He won the Queensland PGA Championship twice.

== Amateur wins ==
- 1981 Australian Amateur

== Professional wins (5) ==
=== PGA Tour of Australia wins (3) ===
No.	Date	Tournament	Winning score	Margin of victory	Runner(s)-up
1	9 Feb 1986	Robert Boyd Transport Victorian Open	−8 (71-67-70-72=280)	1 stroke	(Australia) Vaughan Somers, (New Zealand) Greg Turner
2	5 Oct 1986	Fourex Queensland PGA Championship	−11 (69-70-66-72=277)	10 strokes	(Australia) Brett Ogle, (Australia) Peter Senior
3	12 Feb 1989	Mercedes-Benz Australian Match Play Championship	1 up		(Australia) Peter Fowler

=== Other wins (2) ===
- 1984 Nedlands Masters
- 1992 Queensland PGA Championship (non-tour event)

== Team appearances ==
Amateur

- Sloan Morpeth Trophy (representing Australia): 1982 (tied)
- Australian Men's Interstate Teams Matches (representing Queensland): 1977, 1978, 1979 (winners), 1981, 1982

Professional

- World Cup (representing Australia): 1987
