= Vaughan Somers =

Australian professional golfer (born 1951)

Personal information
- Full name: Vaughan Somers
- Nationality: Australia
- Born: 27 May 1951 (age 75) Queensland, Australia

Career
- Sport: Golf
- Status: Professional
- Former tours: PGA Tour of Australasia; European Tour
- Professional wins: 5

Number of wins by tour
- PGA Tour of Australasia: 4
- Other: 1

Best results in major championships
- Masters Tournament: DNP
- PGA Championship: DNP
- U.S. Open: DNP
- The Open Championship: T21: 1986

Vaughan Somers (born 27 May 1951) is an Australian professional golfer.

== Early life ==
Somers was born in Queensland, Australia.

== Professional career ==
Somers had modest success as a professional golfer, winning the 1975 North Coast Open and the 1985 Ford Dealers South Australian Open. He also had some other top three finishes including runner-up in both the 1983 KLM Dutch Open and the 1986 Victorian Open, and third place in the 1987 Australian Masters.

Somers played in multiple Open Championships, making the cut four times with his best finish a tie for 21st place in the 1986 Open Championship.

== Personal life ==
Somers is now a father to two sons and has worked as the General Manager of the Melbourne Golf Academy (MGA), located on the Melbourne Sandbelt.

== Professional wins (5) ==
=== PGA Tour of Australia wins (4) ===
No.	Date	Tournament	Winning score	Margin of victory	Runner-up
1	12 Oct 1975	North Coast Open	−9 (70-69-71-69=279)	2 strokes	(Australia) Noel Ratcliffe
2	16 Oct 1977	Albury-Wodonga Classic	−11 (70-67-66-70=273)	1 stroke	(Australia) Chris Witcher
3	13 Nov 1983	Victorian PGA Championship (2)	−8 (71-67-71-71=280)	1 stroke	(New Zealand) John Lister
4	27 Oct 1985	Ford Dealers South Australian Open	−4 (76-69-69-70=284)	2 strokes	(Australia) Gerry Taylor

PGA Tour of Australasia playoff record (0–2)

No.	Year	Tournament	Opponent	Result
1	1978	Golden Gate Classic	(Australia) Mike Cahill	Lost to birdie on seventh extra hole
2	1982	Town and Country Western Australian Open	(Australia) Terry Gale	Lost to par on first extra hole

=== Other wins (1) ===
- 1975 South Australian PGA Championship

== Results in major championships ==
Tournament	1978	1979	1980	1981	1982	1983	1984	1985	1986	1987
The Open Championship	T52				CUT	T45	CUT	60	T21	CUT

Note: Somers only played in The Open Championship.

Did not play

CUT = Missed the cut (3rd round cut in 1982 Open Championship)
"T" = Tied

== Team appearances ==
- Hennessy Cognac Cup (representing the Rest of the World): 1982
