= Lu Hsi-chuen =

Taiwanese golfer

Personal information
- Nickname: Master Lu
- Nationality: Taiwan
- Born: 10 December 1953 (age 72) Tansui, Taiwan

Career
- Sport: Golf
- Turned professional: 1978
- Former tours: PGA of Japan Tour; Asia Golf Circuit
- Professional wins: 13

Number of wins by tour
- Japan Golf Tour: 2
- Asian Tour: 11 (Asia Golf Circuit)

Best results in major championships
- Masters Tournament: DNP
- PGA Championship: CUT: 1981
- U.S. Open: CUT: 1980, 1981
- The Open Championship: T46: 1986

Achievements and awards
- Asia Golf Circuit Order of Merit winner: 1979, 1980, 1981, 1986

Lu Hsi-chuen (Chinese: 呂西鈞, born 10 December 1953) is a Taiwanese professional golfer.

== Career ==
Lu had considerable success on the Asia Golf Circuit from 1979 through to the late 1980s, winning ten tournaments, including nine national opens, and capturing the circuit title four times, in 1979, 1980, 1981 and 1986. Lu also played on the Japan Golf Tour, winning twice.

After ending his playing career, Lu became a golf instructor at Sunrise Golf Academy in Yangmei, Taoyuan City, Taiwan.

== Personal life ==
Lu is the nephew of Lu Liang-Huan.

== Professional wins (13) ==
=== PGA of Japan Tour wins (2) ===
No.	Date	Tournament	Winning score	Margin of victory	Runners-up
1	31 May 1981	Mitsubishi Galant Tournament	+1 (69-71-76-73=289)	Playoff	(Japan) Tōru Nakamura, (Japan) Teruo Sugihara
2	21 Aug 1983	Acom Doubles (with (Taiwan) Lu Liang-Huan)	−27 (64-66-66-65=261)	Playoff	(Japan) Hajime Meshiai and (Japan) Masashi Ozaki

PGA of Japan Tour playoff record (2–1)

No.	Year	Tournament	Opponent(s)	Result
1	1981	Mitsubishi Galant Tournament	(Japan) Tōru Nakamura, (Japan) Teruo Sugihara	Won with birdie on first extra hole
2	1981	Hiroshima Open	(Japan) Seiichi Kanai	Lost to birdie on first extra hole
3	1983	Acom Doubles (with (Taiwan) Lu Liang-Huan)	(Japan) Hajime Meshiai and (Japan) Masashi Ozaki	Won with birdie on third extra hole

=== Asia Golf Circuit wins (11) ===
No.	Date	Tournament	Winning score	Margin of victory	Runner(s)-up
1	4 Mar 1979	Singapore Open	−4 (71-70-70-69=280)	Playoff	(Taiwan) Hsu Sheng-san
2	11 Mar 1979	Malaysian Open	−11 (69-71-67-70=277)	7 strokes	(Taiwan) Chen Chien-chin, (Japan) Tsutomu Irie, (United States) Ron Milanovich
3	1 Apr 1979	Indonesia Open	−8 (67-67-70-68=272)	1 stroke	(Myanmar) Mya Aye
4	24 Feb 1980	Philippine Open	−1 (76-70-70-71=287)	1 stroke	(Philippines) Rudy Labares, (Scotland) Sam Torrance
5	9 Mar 1980	Thailand Open	−14 (64-71-71-68=274)	3 strokes	(Southern Rhodesia) Mark McNulty
6	6 Apr 1980	Indonesia Open (2)	−15 (64-68-64-69=265)	8 strokes	(Myanmar) Mya Aye
7	22 Mar 1981	Malaysian Open (2)	−9 (67-68-70-71=276)	1 stroke	(Taiwan) Ho Ming-chung
8	20 Feb 1983	Philippine Open (2)	−11 (71-69-67-70=277)	3 strokes	(Japan) Ikuo Shirahama
9	6 Apr 1986	Charminar Challenge Indian Open	−13 (69-68-70-72=279)	2 strokes	(Taiwan) Lu Chien-soon
10	13 Apr 1986	Taiwan Open	−4 (67-76-69=212) (Note: Shortened to 54 holes due to weather.)	1 stroke	(United States) Curt Byrum, (United States) John Jacobs
11	16 Apr 1989	Maekyung Open	−11 (67-69-70-71=277)	1 stroke	(Taiwan) Chen Liang-hsi

Asia Golf Circuit playoff record (1–0)

No.	Year	Tournament	Opponent	Result
1	1979	Singapore Open	(Taiwan) Hsu Sheng-san	Won after concession on second extra hole

== Team appearances ==
Amateur

- Eisenhower Trophy (representing Taiwan): 1976

Professional

- World Cup (representing Taiwan): 1979, 1980
- Dunhill Cup (representing Taiwan): 1997
