= Geoff Parslow =

Australian professional golfer (born 1947)

Personal information
- Nationality: Australia
- Born: 3 March 1947 (age 79)

Career
- Sport: Golf
- Turned professional: 1964
- Former tours: Asian Golf Circuit; PGA Tour of Australia; European Seniors Tour
- Professional wins: 5

Number of wins by tour
- PGA Tour of Australasia: 1
- Other: 4

Best results in major championships
- Masters Tournament: DNP
- PGA Championship: DNP
- U.S. Open: DNP
- The Open Championship: T54: 1979

Geoff Parslow (born 3 March 1947) is an Australian professional golfer. Although Parslow spent most of his career as a club professional and golf course designer he had success as a touring professional, notably winning the 1977 Victorian Open over Greg Norman and Johnny Miller. By the late 1970s he was considered "undoubtedly the best Australian club professional."

== Professional career ==
Parslow turned professional in 1964. He had success as a young professional, winning the 1964 and 1965 Australian Trainee Championships. Overall he won 19 young professional events during this era. In 1966, he began to play in bigger events. In March and April he played on the Asia Golf Circuit. In October he had some success at the West End Tournament in New Zealand, finishing only two behind Walter Godfrey after the second round.

In 1969, Parslow began to have serious success as a touring professional. He won the Victorian PGA Championship that year. In February 1970, he opened 69-66 (−11) to find himself only one shot back of Englishman Guy Wolstenholme at the Victorian Open (though he would end up finishing well behind David Graham).

For most of career, however, Parslow worked primarily as a club professional and golf course architect. As of August 1972, Parslow was the club pro at Yarra Yarra Golf Club in Bentleigh East, Victoria, a suburb of Melbourne. In 1973, he started the golf architecture company Edward & Geoff Parslow and Associates (EGP) with his brother Ted.

Parslow, however, would intermittently play in professional tournaments as a touring professional throughout the 1970s. He finished runner-up at New Zealand's 1975 Southland Charity Golf Classic, four shots behind Bill Brask. Parslow also received much media attention for his performance at the 1977 Victorian Open. The event was played at his home club, Yarra Yarra, where he would open the club shop in the morning at 9 am. Parslow opened with a two-under-par round. During the second round, three hours after opening the club shop, he went out to play at noon and shot a 63 (−9) to take a 5-shot lead over amateur Kevin Hartley. He tied Tony Jacklin's course record. This was followed by a third round even-par 72 to maintain the five shot lead, this time over Greg Norman. Professionals Johnny Miller, Kel Nagle, and Barry Burgess were a further shot back. In the final round, he recorded a 70 to defeat Norman by four. Alan Cooper finished a shot back in solo third and Nagle and Miller another shot back in a tie for fourth. His performance received much media attention, including from the New York Times. As a club pro, he defeated some of the world's best, in particular reigning Open champion Miller.

On 4 July 1977, he qualified for the 1977 Open Championship. However he played poorly at Turnberry, opening with a 79 and missing the cut. Three weeks later, he played in the Callers of Newcastle tournament, a European Tour event. He played well, finishing in a tie for 13th, three out of a playoff. By 1979 he was considered by a golf journalist for the Canberra Times as "undoubtedly the best Australian club professional not playing the circuit full time."

Two years after his victory, Parslow again played excellently at the Victorian Open, this time held at Kingston Heath Golf Club. He opened with a one-under-par 71 and then a 72 to tie for the lead. He then shot 75 and 73 over the final two rounds to finish at 291 (+3). Though an "unusually high score" for a good result it was enough to get into a playoff. Parslow played against Rodger Davis and defending Masters champion Gary Player. Player had a five-foot putt to win on the first hole but missed. Davis made a five-metre birdie putt on the next hole to win. Parslow won A$5,900 in the defeat.

Later in the year, Parslow qualified for the 1979 Open Championship. He finished T-54 in the event. The following week, he played in the Dutch Open. He shot a course record 66 (−6) in the third round to place himself in a tie for third, just three back. However, amidst the "wet, windy conditions" he fell well back in the final round, losing to compatriot Graham Marsh. In July the following year Parslow won the Australian Four-ball, a team event, with partner Paul Foley.

During the ensuing decades Parslow focused mainly on his work as a club pro and golf course designer. In January 1980, Parslow transitioned as a club professional from Yarra Yarra Golf Club to Tweed Heads Golf Club. In 1988, he and his brother designed Murray Downs Golf and Country Club. In the early 1990s, his company expanded into Asia. In 1992, he formed Edward & Geoff Parslow (M) Sdn Bhd to serve clients in Malaysia and ultimately moved offices to Kuala Lumpur. Later that year, they completed their design of the Golf Club Datai Bay in Malaysia. The company has also designed Kuala Lumpur Golf and Country Club, a course that has hosted the PGA Tour. In 1994, they formed the subsidiary Edward & Geoff Parslow (Fareast) Ltd. to serve clients in China.

=== Senior career ===
In middle of 1997, when he turned 50, Parslow decided to play on the international senior circuit. In 1998, his first full season on the European Seniors Tour, he recorded one top-10 in 18 events and finished 45th on the Order of Merit. Two years later, in 2000, he recorded his second top−10, a third place tie at the Belfry PGA Seniors Championship with Kurt Cox, one out of a playoff. He was never able to break through and win, however, or finish within the top-30 of the Order of Merit. His top-10 at the Belfry was his second and final top-10 on the tour. After 2002, he did not play again on tour. He has also played some Asian and Australian senior events.

== Personal life ==
Parslow has a brother, Ted. Like Parslow, Ted was a very talented amateur golfer. In addition, Ted holds degrees in Civil Engineering from the University of Melbourne. He dovetailed these skills to be a golf course designer. He has teamed up with Parslow, working together on a golf course design company.

As of 1979 Parslow was married. In his spare time he enjoys gardening and surfing.

== Professional wins (5) ==
=== PGA Tour of Australasia wins (1) ===
No.	Date	Tournament	Winning score	Margin of victory	Runner-up
1	27 Feb 1977	Victorian Open	−13 (70-63-72-70=275)	4 strokes	(Australia) Greg Norman

PGA Tour of Australasia playoff record (0–1)

No.	Year	Tournament	Opponents	Result
1	1979	Victorian Open	(Australia) Rodger Davis, (South Africa) Gary Player	Davis won with birdie on second extra hole

=== Other wins (4) ===
- 1964 Australia Trainee Championship
- 1965 Australia Trainee Championship
- 1969 Victorian PGA Championship
- 1980 Australian Four-Ball (with Paul Foley)

== Results in major championships ==
Tournament	1977	1978	1979
The Open Championship	CUT		T54

Did not play

CUT = missed the half-way cut
"T" = tied
