= West Lakes Classic =

Tournament information
- Established: 1975
- Tour: PGA Tour of Australasia
- Format: Stroke play
- Final year: 1982

Final champion
- (Australia) Ian Stanley

The West Lakes Classic was a golf tournament held in the Adelaide area of South Australia from 1975 to 1982.

== History ==
The event was historically sponsored by the Commercial Bank of Australia. In 1982 it was merged into a new bank called Westpac and the event was called the Westpac Classic in its final year. Prize money was A$20,000 in 1975, A$35,000 in 1976, A$50,000 in 1977, A$60,000 in 1978, A$65,000 in 1979, A$75,000 in 1980, A$80,000 in 1981 and A$100,000 in 1982.

The event is perhaps best known as the site of Greg Norman's first professional victory. Norman still regards this as his most important win.

== Winners ==
Year	Winner	Country	Venue	Score	To par	Margin of victory	Runner(s)-up	Winner's share (A$)	Ref
Westpac Classic
1982	Ian Stanley	Australia	Royal Adelaide	285	−7	3 strokes	(Australia) Stewart Ginn	18,000	
CBA West Lakes Classic
1981	Eamonn Darcy	Ireland	Royal Adelaide	285	−7	Playoff^{1}	(Scotland) Sam Torrance	14,400	
1980	Bob Shaw	Australia	The Grange	285	−3	2 strokes	(Australia) Ted Ball	15,000	
1979	David Graham	Australia	The Grange	285	−3	2 strokes	(Australia) Bob Shearer (United States) Gary Vanier	13,000	
1978	Wayne Grady	Australia	The Grange	280	−4	2 strokes	(Australia) Bob Shearer	12,000	
1977	Bob Shearer (2)	Australia	The Grange	271	−13	6 strokes	(Australia) David Good	10,000	
West Lakes Classic
1976	Greg Norman	Australia	The Grange	271	−13	5 strokes	(Australia) David Graham (Australia) Graham Marsh	7,000	
1975	Bob Shearer	Australia	The Grange	282	−2	Playoff^{2}	(Australia) Mike Cahill	4,000	

^{1} In 1981, Darcy won at the first extra hole.
^{2} In 1975, Shearer won at the third extra hole.
