= Colin Bishop =

English rugby union player

- Full name: Colin Charles Bishop
- Born: 5 October 1903 Hampstead, England
- Died: 4 March 1980 (aged 76) Winchester, England
- University: University of Cambridge

Rugby union career
- Position: Stand-off
International career
Years	Team	Apps	(Points)
1927	England	1	(0)

Colin Charles Bishop (5 October 1903 – 4 March 1980) was an English international rugby union player.

Born in Hampstead, Bishop was primarily a stand-off, but also played centre.

Bishop gained a Cambridge University rugby blue in 1925 and also played for Blackheath. He won his solitary England cap against France in a 1927 Five Nations match in Paris, forming a halfback partnership with his Blackheath and varsity teammate Arthur Young, but they could not make an impact in a 0–3 loss.

== See also ==
- List of England national rugby union players
