= ESP Open =

Tournament information
- Location: Canberra, Australia
- Established: 1988
- Course: Royal Canberra Golf Club
- Par: 72
- Tour: PGA Tour of Australia
- Format: Stroke play
- Month played: February
- Final year: 1988

Tournament record score
- Aggregate: 269 Greg Norman (1988)
- To par: −19 as above

Final champion
- (Australia) Greg Norman
- Location in Australia Location in Australian Capital Territory

The ESP Open was a golf tournament held in Australia in February 1988 at the Royal Canberra Golf Club, Canberra. The tournament was originally intended to run for an initial three years, but this was changed to a year-by-year arrangement after title sponsors ESP Pty Ltd agreed to also sponsor the Australian PGA Championship in 1987. This arrangement also resulted in a reduction in prize money for the ESP Open, which was halved from A$500,000 to A$250,000.

The ESP Open was scheduled to be played for the second time in January 1989 but was cancelled because of a clash of dates with the inaugural Coca-Cola Classic. Ultimately, the tournament was not held again.

== Winners ==
Year	Winner	Score	To par	Margin of victory	Runner-up	Winner's share (A$)	Ref.
1988	(Australia) Greg Norman	269	−19	7 strokes	(West Germany) Bernhard Langer	45,000	
