= Stewart Ginn =

Australian professional golfer (born 1949)

Personal information
- Nationality: Australia
- Born: 2 June 1949 (age 77) Melbourne, Australia
- Height: 1.80 m (5 ft 11 in)
- Weight: 86 kg (190 lb; 13.5 st)

Career
- Sport: Golf
- Turned professional: 1971
- Former tours: European Tour; Japan Golf Tour; Asia Golf Circuit; PGA Tour of Australasia; Champions Tour; European Seniors Tour
- Professional wins: 19

Number of wins by tour
- European Tour: 1
- Japan Golf Tour: 1
- PGA Tour of Australasia: 9
- PGA Tour Champions: 1
- European Senior Tour: 1
- Other: 5 (Regular); 1 (Senior)

Best results in major championships
- Masters Tournament: DNP
- PGA Championship: DNP
- U.S. Open: DNP
- The Open Championship: T21: 1976

Achievements and awards
- PGA Tour of Australia Order of Merit winner: 1973

Stewart Ginn (born 2 June 1949) is an Australian professional golfer.

== Early life ==
In 1949, Ginn was born in Melbourne, Australia. He grew up behind the twelfth green of the Royal Melbourne Golf Club. Early in his life "he used to caddy at Royal Melbourne." He then moved on to be a golf manager at the club.

== Professional career ==
In the 1970s and 1980s he won several professional tournaments on the PGA Tour of Australasia and one on the European Tour, the 1974 Martini International. He also played regularly on the Asia Golf Circuit, winning three tournaments, and on the Japan Golf Tour, where he has one win. He won the inaugural PGA Tour of Australia Order of Merit in 1973. In 1979 he won the Australian PGA Championship at Royal Melbourne at 284 (E). He defeated Bob Shearer and Bob Charles by three shots.

As a senior, he played full-time on the U.S.-based Champions Tour from 2000 to 2004. His one official money win at that level came at one of the senior majors, the 2002 Senior Players Championship.

Ginn had an unusual outfit for a professional golfer, wearing old-fashioned knickerbockers. This influenced Payne Stewart who adopted the style.

== Personal life ==
Ginn lives in Kuala Lumpur, Malaysia. He is married and has a son, Stewart Ginn Jr., who is also an amateur golfer.

== Awards and honors ==
In 1973, Gina won the Order of Merit on the PGA Tour of Australasia.

== Professional wins (19) ==
=== European Tour wins (1) ===
No.	Date	Tournament	Winning score	Margin of victory	Runner-up
1	8 Jun 1974	Martini International	−2 (71-71-71-73=286)	1 stroke	(Wales) Brian Huggett

=== PGA of Japan Tour wins (1) ===
No.	Date	Tournament	Winning score	Margin of victory	Runner-up
1	15 Oct 1995	Golf Digest Tournament	−17 (70-69-64-64=267)	2 strokes	(Canada) Rick Gibson

=== Asia Golf Circuit wins (3) ===
No.	Date	Tournament	Winning score	Margin of victory	Runner-up
1	13 Mar 1977	Malaysian Open	−12 (76-67-63-70=276)	1 stroke	(Japan) Katsunari Takahashi
2	9 Mar 1986	Benson & Hedges Malaysian Open (2)	−8 (70-69-67-70=276)	1 stroke	(Australia) Brian Jones
3	29 Mar 1992	Wills Indian Open	−4 (68-73-70-73=284)	2 strokes	(United States) Aaron Meeks

=== PGA Tour of Australasia wins (9) ===
No.	Date	Tournament	Winning score	Margin of victory	Runner(s)-up
1	18 Feb 1973	Tasmanian Open	−4 (72-67-66-75=280)	2 strokes	(Australia) David Good, (Australia) Ian Paul, (Australia) Randall Vines
2	7 Oct 1973	North Coast Open	−9 (67-74-68-69=279)	5 strokes	(Australia) Tom Linskey
3	2 Feb 1975	Tasmanian Open (2)	−8 (70-69-66-67=272)	Playoff	(Australia) Ross Metherell
4	9 Feb 1975	Victorian Open	−5 (72-76-66-69=283)	3 strokes	(Australia) Ian Stanley
5	9 Sep 1979	Joe Jansen New South Wales PGA Championship	−13 (68-71-69-67=275)	8 strokes	(New Zealand) Richard Coombes
6	11 Nov 1979	Mayne Nickless Australian PGA Championship	E (71-72-69-72=284)	3 strokes	(New Zealand) Bob Charles, (Australia) Bob Shearer
7	10 Feb 1980	Tattersall's Tasmanian Open (3)	−8 (68-67-72-73=280)	3 strokes	(Australia) Brian Jones
8	2 Feb 1986	Foster's Tasmanian Open (4)	−7 (70-71-69-71=281)	Playoff	(Sweden) Magnus Persson
9	6 Oct 1991	Rothmans Malaysian Masters	−10 (70-70-70-68=278)	3 strokes	(Sri Lanka) Nandasena Perera

PGA Tour of Australasia playoff record (2–4)

No.	Year	Tournament	Opponent(s)	Result
1	1975	Tasmanian Open	(Australia) Ross Metherell	Won with par on first extra hole
2	1976	Tasmanian Open	(Australia) David Good, (Australia) Brian Jones, (Australia) Ian Stanley	Good won with birdie on fifth extra hole Ginn and Stanley eliminated by par on first hole
3	1976	Chrysler Classic	(Australia) Bob Shearer	Lost to birdie on first extra hole
4	1979	Tooth's Gold Coast – Tweed Classic	(Australia) Mike Ferguson	Lost to birdie on third extra hole
5	1979	Garden State Victorian PGA Championship	(Australia) Ian Stanley	Lost to par on second extra hole
6	1986	Foster's Tasmanian Open	(Sweden) Magnus Persson	Won with birdie on second extra hole

=== New Zealand Golf Circuit wins (1) ===
No.	Date	Tournament	Winning score	Margin of victory	Runner-up
1	9 Dec 1979	New Zealand Open	−6 (70-68-71-69=278)	3 strokes	(New Zealand) Simon Owen

=== Other Australasian wins (1) ===
- 1974 Victorian PGA Championship

=== Senior PGA Tour wins (1) ===
Legend
Senior PGA Tour major championships (1)
Other Senior PGA Tour (0)

No.	Date	Tournament	Winning score	Margin of victory	Runners-up
1	8 Jun 2002	Ford Senior Players Championship	−14 (66-72-70-66=274)	1 stroke	(United States) Hubert Green, (United States) Mike McCullough, (United States) Jim Thorpe

=== European Seniors Tour wins (1) ===
No.	Date	Tournament	Winning score	Margin of victory	Runner-up
1	30 Mar 2008	Azores Senior Open	−5 (72-71-68=211)	2 strokes	(England) Nick Job

European Seniors Tour playoff record (0–1)

No.	Year	Tournament	Opponents	Result
1	2006	AIB Irish Seniors Open	(United States) Jerry Bruner, (Chile) Guillermo Encina, (Scotland) Sam Torrance	Torrance won with eagle on second extra hole Encina and Ginn eliminated by birdie on first hole

=== Other senior wins (1) ===
- 2004 Liberty Mutual Legends of Golf - Raphael Division (with Bob Charles)

== Results in major championships ==
Tournament	1974	1975	1976	1977	1978	1979
The Open Championship	CUT		T21	T46	CUT	

Tournament	1980	1981	1982	1983	1984	1985	1986	1987	1988	1989	1990
The Open Championship	T38	CUT									CUT

Note: Ginn only played in The Open Championship.

Did not play

CUT = missed the half-way cut (3rd round cut in 1981 Open Championship)
"T" = tied

== Senior PGA Tour major championships ==
=== Wins (1) ===
Year	Championship	Winning score	Margin	Runners-up
2002	Ford Senior Players Championship	−14 (66-72-70-66=274)	1 stroke	(United States) Hubert Green, (United States) Mike McCullough, (United States) Jim Thorpe

== Team appearances ==
- UBS Warburg Cup (representing the Rest of the World): 2001, 2002
