= Bob Shaw (golfer) =

Australian professional golfer

Personal information
- Full name: Robert J. Shaw
- Nationality: Australia
- Born: 24 December 1944 (age 81) Sydney, Australia
- Height: 6 ft 0 in (1.83 m)
- Weight: 200 lb (91 kg; 14 st)

Career
- Sport: Golf
- Turned professional: 1965
- Former tours: PGA Tour; PGA Tour of Australia
- Professional wins: 9

Number of wins by tour
- PGA Tour: 1
- PGA Tour of Australasia: 4
- Other: 4

Best results in major championships
- Masters Tournament: CUT: 1973
- PGA Championship: T20: 1972
- U.S. Open: CUT: 1969, 1970
- The Open Championship: T27: 1968

Robert J. Shaw (born 24 December 1944) is an Australian professional golfer. He played on the PGA Tour in the 1970s.

== Career ==
Shaw was born in Sydney, Australia.

In 1965, Shaw turned professional. He played in Europe in 1968, winning the Spanish Open. Later in the year he qualified for the PGA Tour at 1968 APG Tour Qualifying School. His best finishes in PGA Tour events were a T-2 at both the 1969 Tallahassee Open and the 1971 Greater Milwaukee Open plus a win at the 1972 Tallahassee Open with a 15-under-par 273 by two strokes over Leonard Thompson. His best finish in a major was T20 at the 1972 PGA Championship.

== Professional wins (9) ==
=== PGA Tour wins (1) ===
No.	Date	Tournament	Winning score	Margin of victory	Runner-up
1	23 Apr 1972	Tallahassee Open	−15 (70-67-68-68=273)	2 strokes	(United States) Leonard Thompson

=== PGA Tour of Australia wins (4) ===
No.	Date	Tournament	Winning score	Margin of victory	Runner-up
1	26 Oct 1980	CBA West Lakes Classic	−3 (72-67-71-75=285)	2 strokes	(Australia) Ted Ball
2	17 Jan 1982	Tooth's Illawarra Open	−11 (71-64-67-75=277)	1 stroke	(Australia) Colin Bishop
3	6 Feb 1983	Tasmanian Open	−9 (68-71-66-66=271)	1 stroke	(Australia) Ian Stanley
4	15 May 1983	Halls Head Western Open	−3 (71-71-73-70=285)	1 stroke	(Australia) Peter Fowler

=== Other wins (4) ===
- 1968 New Zealand PGA Championship, Brisbane Water Tournament, Spanish Open
- 1975 Jamaica Open

== Results in major championships ==
Tournament	1968	1969	1970	1971	1972	1973
Masters Tournament						CUT
U.S. Open		CUT	CUT			
The Open Championship	T27					
PGA Championship					T20	

Did not play

CUT = missed the half-way cut
"T" indicates a tie for a place

== Team appearances ==
- World Cup (representing Australia): 1980

== See also ==
- 1968 APG Tour Qualifying School graduates
