= El Bosque Seniors Open =

Tournament information
- Location: Chiva, Valencia, Spain
- Established: 1998
- Courses: El Bosque Golf & Country Club
- Par: 72
- Tour: European Seniors Tour
- Format: Stroke play
- Prize fund: £100,000
- Month played: May
- Final year: 1998

Tournament record score
- Aggregate: 201 Tommy Horton (1998)
- To par: −15 as above

Final champion
- (England) Tommy Horton
- Location in Spain Location in the Valencian Community

Location in Spain

The El Bosque Seniors Open was a men's senior (over 50) professional golf tournament on the European Seniors Tour, held at the El Bosque Golf & Country Club in Chiva, Valencia, Spain, west of the City of Valencia. It was held just once, in May 1998, and was won by Tommy Horton who finished nine shots ahead of Noel Ratcliffe. Horton's nine stroke win equalled the record he had set in the 1997 Scottish Seniors Open. Total prize money was £100,000 with the winner receiving £16,660.

== Winners ==
Year	Winner	Score	To par	Margin of victory	Runner-up
1998	(England) Tommy Horton	201	−15	9 strokes	(Australia) Noel Ratcliffe
