= Brian Waites =

English professional golfer (1940–2025)

Personal information
- Full name: Brian J. Waites
- Nationality: England
- Born: 1 March 1940 Bolton, Lancashire, England
- Died: 8 March 2025 (aged 85)
- Height: 6 ft 1 in (1.85 m)

Career
- Sport: Golf
- Turned professional: 1957
- Former tours: European Tour; European Seniors Tour
- Professional wins: 41

Number of wins by tour
- European Tour: 2
- European Senior Tour: 4
- Other: 33 (regular); 2 (senior)

Best results in major championships
- Masters Tournament: DNP
- PGA Championship: DNP
- U.S. Open: DNP
- The Open Championship: T19: 1983

Brian J. Waites (1 March 1940 – 8 March 2025) was an English professional golfer. Although he turned professional in 1957, he played little top-level golf for the next 20 years, but then had considerable success, winning twice on the European Tour, five times on the Safari Circuit and playing in the 1983 Ryder Cup. After reaching 50 he had further success as a senior, winning the PGA Seniors Championship twice, and winning four times on the European Senior Tour. Waites died of complications from Parkinson's disease on 8 March 2025, at the age of 85.

== Professional career ==
Waites turned professional in 1957. He was an assistant professional at Hesketh Golf Club in Southport, becoming the professional at Saltburn Golf Club in Saltburn-by-the-Sea from 1961, before moving to Brough Golf Club in East Yorkshire in 1965. In early 1969 Waites became the professional at Hollinwell (Notts Golf Club), replacing David Talbot. He stayed at Hollinwell until 1998. Before moving to Hollinwell, Waites played relatively few national events and had limited success. While at Saltburn, he qualified for the 1964 Open Championship at St Andrews but missed the cut. After moving to Brough, he won the Yorkshire Open Championship in 1966 and was tied for third place in the 1968 Bowmaker Tournament, a 36-hole event at Sunningdale Golf Club.

In 1969 Waites qualified for the Open Championship at Royal Lytham and played all four rounds, finishing tied for 34th place. In the News of the World Matchplay in September, just his third national event of the year, he qualified in second place and reached the quarter-finals before losing to the eventual winner, Maurice Bembridge. Waites continue to play few national events in the early 1970s but had success locally. He won the Midland Open Championship in 1971 and the Midland Professional Championship in 1972. He played in the inaugural PGA Club Professionals' Championship in 1973 at Calcot Park Golf Club. The event was won by Doug Sewell but Waites was in the leading nine finishers that formed the team for the first Diamondhead Cup, played later in 1973. Waites continued to play in the PGA Club Professionals' Championship, finishing tied for fourth place in the 1975 and runner-up in 1976, to get a place each year in the PGA Cup, which replaced the Diamondhead Cup. In late 1976 he reached the quarter-finals of the Sun Alliance Match Play Championship, losing to Brian Barnes.

In the late 1970s Waites gradually extended his schedule. He played on the Safari Tour in 1977 and was a runner-up in the Zambia Open, behind Tommy Horton. In 1977 he had his first top-10 finishes in stroke-play events on the European Tour, finishing 6th in the Benson and Hedges International Open and 5th in the Callers of Newcastle tournament, a stroke from being in a playoff. He was also 5th in the PGA Club Professionals' Championship.

Between 1978 and 1984 Waites was ranked in top 25 of the European Tour Order of Merit in each of those seven years. He won two European Tour events. He had his first win on the European Tour in 1978 at the Tournament Players Championship, finishing a stroke ahead of Neil Coles and taking the first prize of £8,000. Two weeks later he was a runner-up in the Dunlop Masters. a shot behind Tommy Horton. His best performance in 1979 was again late in year, a solo runner-up finish in the TPC behind Michael King. In 1980 Waites lost to Des Smyth at the sixth hole of a sudden-death playoff in the Cold Shield Greater Manchester Open, and was a runner-up in the Bob Hope British Classic. In 1981 he again came close to winning the TPC, but lost at the fourth hole of a playoff to Brian Barnes, who had earlier scored a final round 62 to tie with Waites. Waites second European Tour win came at the 1982 Car Care Plan International, winning by a stroke despite a final round 73 and taking the first prize of £10,000.

Despite his successes, Waites continued to play in the PGA Club Professionals' Championship. He was runner-up in 1978, tied for third place in 1979 and solo third in 1980, to get a place each year in the PGA Cup, although he turned down the place in 1980 because of a clash with the Tournament Players Championship. Later in 1980 the PGA changed the eligibility rules, excluding Waites from the event for a number of years.

Waites was a member of the European 1983 Ryder Cup team. The European team of 12 was chosen entirely from the 1983 European Tour money list as at the conclusion of the St. Mellion Timeshare TPC on September 18. Waites was guaranteed his place before the final event and didn't play in it, finishing 7th in the money list with £40,482 and making his only appearance at the age of 43. He had played in 19 qualifying events and although he had not won, he had made the cut in all 19, with 7 top-10 finishes including runner-up finishes in the Car Care Plan International and the Lawrence Batley International. Europe lost the Ryder Cup by a single point. Waites played in four matches, winning in a four-ball match with Ken Brown on the opening day. Waites and Brown lost both their matches on the second day and Waites lost his singles match on the final day to Calvin Peete by one hole. Waites also represented England three times at the World Cup, in 1980, 1982 and 1983.

Waites had some success on the Safari Circuit, winning five times between 1980 and 1985. His first win was in the Kenya Open in March 1980. His other four wins were in Zambia. He won the Mufulira Open in 1980, a week after his Kenyan win, and he won there again in 1982. He won the Zambia Open the following week and won the Cock o' the North in 1985 at the age of 45.

Waites was runner-up in the 1984 Tunisian Open, the opening event of the European Tour season but had little success on the tour after that. In 1990 he became eligible for seniors events and won the Trusthouse Forte PGA Seniors Championship in 1990 and 1991, with Neil Coles runner-up both times. In 1990 he was a joint runner-up in the Seniors' British Open, a stroke behind Gary Player. In August 1991 Waites was seriously injured in a car accident, spending three months in hospital. He made a full recovery and joined the European Senior Tour in its 1992 debut season, although he missed the opening event of the season. He had a successful career at that level, winning four tournaments and making the top ten on the Order of Merit four times. In 1999 he became the first player to make 100 appearances on the European Senior Tour.

Waites won the Nottinghamshire Open Championship seven times, the Notts Professional Strokeplay Championship seven times and the Notts Professional Matchplay Championship five times.

== Professional wins (41) ==
=== European Tour wins (2) ===
No.	Date	Tournament	Winning score	Margin of victory	Runner(s)-up
1	17 Sep 1978	Tournament Players Championship	−6 (75-69-73-69=286)	1 stroke	(England) Neil Coles
2	23 May 1982	Car Care Plan International	−8 (68-69-66-73=276)	1 stroke	(Scotland) Brian Barnes, (England) Paul Hoad

European Tour playoff record (0–2)

No.	Year	Tournament	Opponent	Result
1	1980	Cold Shield Greater Manchester Open	(Republic of Ireland) Des Smyth	Lost to birdie on sixth extra hole
2	1981	Haig Whisky TPC	(Scotland) Brian Barnes	Lost to par on fourth extra hole

=== Safari Circuit wins (5) ===
- 1980 Benson & Hedges Kenya Open, Mufulira Open
- 1982 Mufulira Open, Zambia Open
- 1985 Cock of the North

=== Other wins (28) ===
- 1966 Yorkshire Open Championship
- 1969 Nottinghamshire Open, Notts Professional Strokeplay Championship, Notts Professional Matchplay Championship
- 1971 Midland Open Championship, Nottinghamshire Open, Notts Professional Matchplay Championship
- 1972 Midland Professional Championship, Notts Professional Strokeplay Championship
- 1973 Nottinghamshire Open
- 1974 Nottinghamshire Open
- 1975 Notts Professional Strokeplay Championship, Notts Professional Matchplay Championship
- 1976 Midland Open Championship
- 1977 Midland Professional Championship, Notts Professional Matchplay Championship
- 1978 Midland Professional Championship, Nottinghamshire Open
- 1979 Midland Professional Championship
- 1980 Notts Professional Strokeplay Championship
- 1981 Midland Open Championship, Notts Professional Strokeplay Championship
- 1982 Nottinghamshire Open
- 1986 Nottinghamshire Open, Notts Professional Strokeplay Championship
- 1988 Midland Masters
- 1989 Notts Professional Strokeplay Championship, Notts Professional Matchplay Championship

=== European Seniors Tour wins (4) ===
No.	Date	Tournament	Winning score	Margin of victory	Runner(s)-up
1	10 Jun 1994	D Day Seniors Open	−10 (69-66-71=206)	6 strokes	(Spain) Antonio Garrido
2	20 Aug 1995	Northern Electric Seniors	−1 (72-70-73=215)	2 strokes	(Spain) Francisco Abreu, (England) Peter Butler, (England) Neil Coles, (Australia) Noel Ratcliffe, (South Africa) Bobby Verwey
3	10 Aug 1997	Credit Suisse Private Banking Seniors Open	−7 (63-69-71=203)	Playoff	(England) Malcolm Gregson
4	26 Sep 1998	Elf Seniors Open (2)	−12 (66-66-63=195)	4 strokes	(Republic of Ireland) Denis O'Sullivan

European Seniors Tour playoff record (1–0)

No.	Year	Tournament	Opponent	Result
1	1997	Credit Suisse Private Banking Seniors Open	(England) Malcolm Gregson	Won with birdie on second extra hole

=== Other senior wins (2) ===
Date	Tournament	Winning score	Margin of victory	Runner-up
17 Jun 1990	Trusthouse Forte PGA Seniors Championship	−3 (69-66-68-66=269)	4 strokes	(England) Neil Coles
16 Jun 1991	Trusthouse Forte PGA Seniors Championship	−7 (69-69-69-70=277)	3 strokes	(England) Neil Coles

== Results in major championships ==
Tournament	1964	1965	1966	1967	1968	1969
The Open Championship	CUT					T34

Tournament	1970	1971	1972	1973	1974	1975	1976	1977	1978	1979
The Open Championship		T58			T51	T40	CUT	T52		CUT

Tournament	1980	1981	1982	1983	1984
The Open Championship	T32	T50	T47	T19	CUT

Note: Waites only played in The Open Championship.

Did not play

CUT = missed the half-way cut (3rd round cut in 1976 and 1984 Open Championships)
"T" indicates a tie for a place

== Team appearances ==
- Ryder Cup (representing Europe): 1983
- World Cup (representing England): 1980, 1982, 1983
- Hennessy Cognac Cup (representing Great Britain and Ireland): 1980 (winners), 1982 (winners), (representing England) 1984 (winners)
- PGA Cup/Diamondhead Cup (representing Great Britain and Ireland/Europe): 1973, 1975, 1976, 1977, 1978 (winners), 1979 (winners), 1990
- Chrysler Cup (representing the International team): 1991
- Praia d'El Rey European Cup: 1997 (winners), 1998 (tie)
