= Lawrence Batley Seniors =

Tournament information
- Location: Huddersfield, England
- Established: 1992
- Course: Huddersfield Golf Club
- Par: 71
- Length: 6,454 yards (5,902 m)
- Tour: European Seniors Tour
- Format: Stroke play
- Prize fund: £125,000
- Month played: June
- Final year: 2002

Tournament record score
- Aggregate: 202 John Morgan (1994)
- To par: −9 Eddie Polland (1999) −9 Nick Job (1999)

Final champion
- (England) Neil Coles
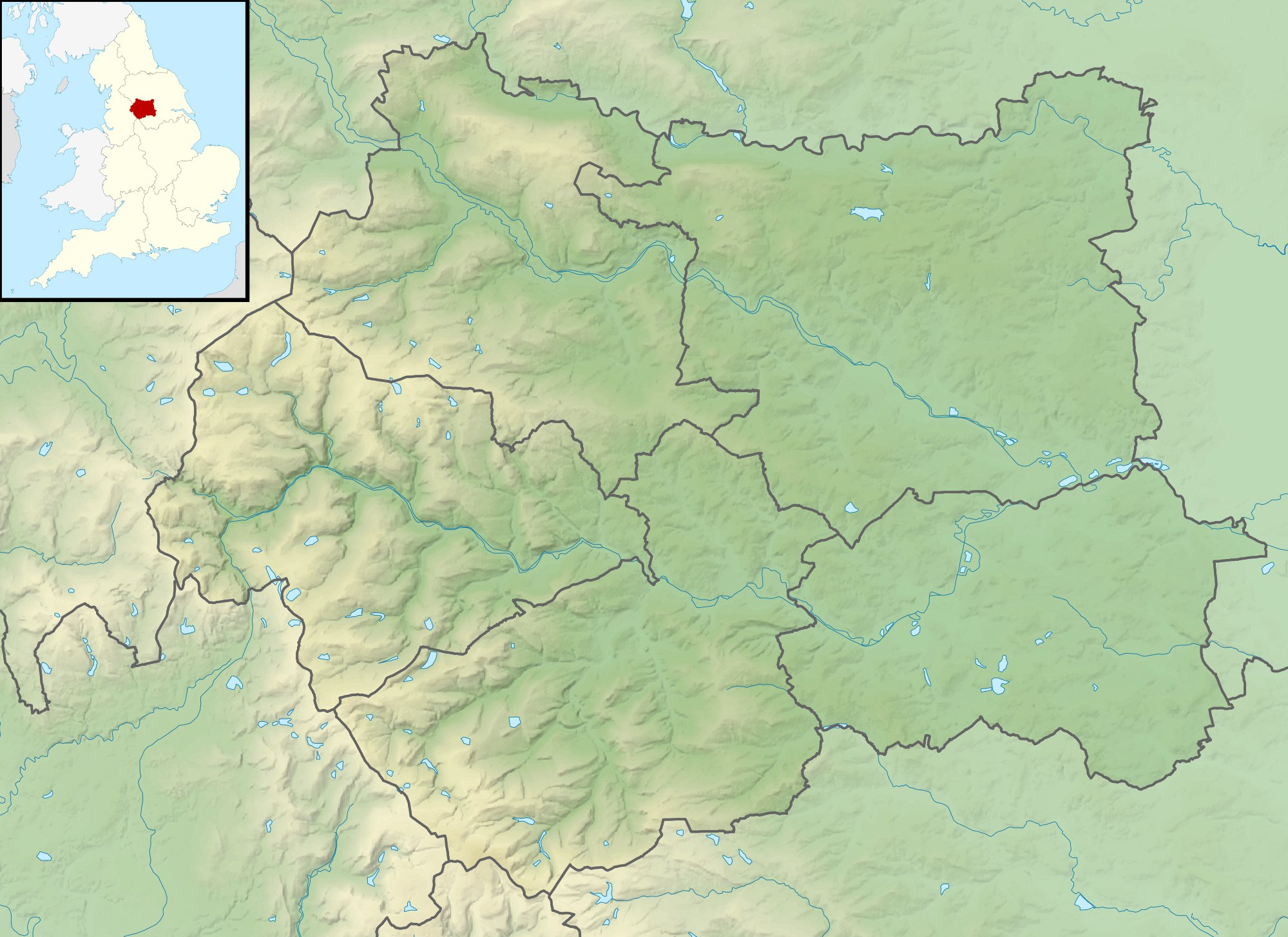
- Location in England Location in West Yorkshire

The Lawrence Batley Seniors was a senior (over 50s) men's professional golf tournament on the European Senior Tour. It was played from 1992 to 2002 in the Huddersfield area of West Yorkshire, England. From 1995 the tournament was held at Huddersfield Golf Club, north of Huddersfield, while in 1994 it was held at Woodsome Hall Golf Club, south-west of Huddersfield, and in 1992 and 1993 at both venues. The tournament was sponsored by Lawrence Batley who had earlier supported a European Tour event, the Lawrence Batley International, from 1981 to 1987. Batley died in August 2002, soon after the final tournament.

Neil Coles won the final tournament in 2002 and set a record as the oldest winner of a European Senior Tour event, aged 67 years and 276 days.

== Winners ==
Year	Winner	Score	To par	Margin of victory	Runner(s)-up	Ref.
2002	(England) Neil Coles	209	−4	Playoff	(England) David Creamer (United States) Steve Stull	
2001	(England) Nick Job	204	−9	5 strokes	(England) Denis Durnian	
2000	(Scotland) David Huish	212	−1	Playoff	(England) Neil Coles (South Africa) John Fourie	
1999	(Northern Ireland) Eddie Polland	204	−9	2 strokes	(Spain) Antonio Garrido	
1998	(South Africa) Bobby Verwey (2)	210	−3	Playoff	(Spain) Antonio Garrido	
1997	(Spain) Antonio Garrido	206	−7	1 stroke	(Italy) Renato Campagnoli	
1996	(England) Malcolm Gregson	209	−4	2 strokes	(England) Neil Coles (Italy) Alberto Croce	
1995	(Italy) Alberto Croce	209	−4	1 stroke	(England) Tommy Horton	
1994	(England) John Morgan	202	−8	4 strokes	(Spain) José Maria Roca	
1993	(England) Peter Butler	207	−5	1 stroke	(Republic of Ireland) Michael Murphy	
1992	(South Africa) Bobby Verwey	204	−8	6 strokes	(England) David Butler (England) Peter Butler (England) Tommy Horton	
