= Wentworth Senior Masters =

Tournament information
- Location: Virginia Water, Surrey, England
- Established: 1997
- Course: Wentworth Club
- Par: 72
- Length: 6,869 yards (6,281 m)
- Tour: European Seniors Tour
- Format: Stroke play
- Prize fund: £250,000
- Month played: June
- Final year: 2007

Tournament record score
- Aggregate: 203 Sam Torrance (2004)
- To par: −13 as above

Final champion
- (Republic of Ireland) Des Smyth
- Location in England Location in Surrey

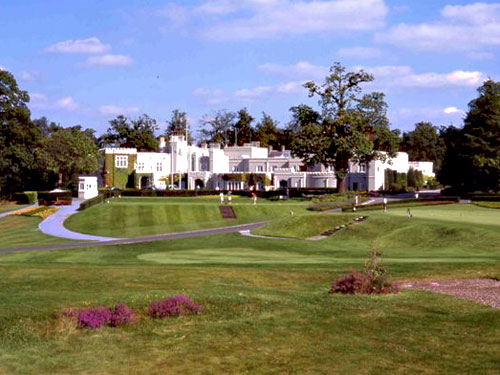
Wentworth clubhouse

The Wentworth Senior Masters was a men's professional golf tournament on the European Seniors Tour from 1997 to 2007.

The first tournament was won by multi-major winner Gary Player. It was staged at the Wentworth Club beyond the western fringe of London, which has the headquarters of the PGA European Tour European Seniors Tour Championship, as the Seniors Tour's fixed location tournament.

It was played on the Edinburgh Course. The two European Tour tournaments at the club (the corporate-sponsored PGA Championship and the World Match Play Championship) were played over the West Course. In 2007 the prize fund was £250,000.

== Winners ==
Year	Winner	Score	To par	Margin of victory	Runner(s)-up
Wentworth Senior Masters
2007	(Republic of Ireland) Des Smyth	210	−6	2 strokes	(New Zealand) Bob Charles
2006	(Argentina) Eduardo Romero (2)	207	−9	2 strokes	(Argentina) Horacio Carbonetti (Scotland) Sam Torrance
Travis Perkins Senior Masters
2005	(Argentina) Eduardo Romero	205	−11	8 strokes	(Argentina) Luis Carbonetti (England) Nick Job
2004	(Scotland) Sam Torrance	203	−13	2 strokes	(Japan) Seiji Ebihara
2003	(Scotland) John Chillas	209	−7	1 stroke	(Republic of Ireland) Eamonn Darcy
2002	(United States) Ray Carrasco	206	−10	1 stroke	(Japan) Seiji Ebihara
Energis Senior Masters
2001	(United States) David Oakley	208	−8	3 strokes	(England) Malcolm Gregson
2000	(England) David Creamer	208	−8	1 stroke	(Australia) Ian Stanley
1999	(England) Neil Coles	205	−11	1 stroke	(Scotland) David Huish
Schroder Senior Masters
1998	(Wales) Brian Huggett	209	−7	Playoff	(England) Neil Coles (Northern Ireland) Eddie Polland
Shell Wentworth Senior Masters
1997	(South Africa) Gary Player	207	−9	1 stroke	(Spain) José María Cañizares (England) David Creamer
