= Palmerston Trophy Berlin =

Tournament information
- Location: Berlin, Germany
- Established: 2001
- Course: Sporting Club Berlin
- Par: 72
- Length: 6,637 yards (6,069 m)
- Tour: European Seniors Tour
- Format: Stroke play
- Prize fund: €200,000
- Month played: June
- Final year: 2001

Tournament record score
- Aggregate: 212 Denis O'Sullivan (2001)
- To par: −4 as above

Final champion
- (Republic of Ireland) Denis O'Sullivan
- Location in Germany Location in Brandenburg

The Palmerston Trophy Berlin was a men's senior (over 50) professional golf tournament on the European Seniors Tour, held on the Faldo course at the Sporting Club Berlin in Bad Saarow, 50 km south-west of Berlin, Germany. It was held just once, in June 2001, and was won by Denis O'Sullivan who finished four shots ahead of Seiji Ebihara and Eddie Polland. The total prize fund was €200,000 with the winner receiving €30,500.

== Winners ==
Year	Winner	Score	To par	Margin of victory	Runners-up
2001	(Republic of Ireland) Denis O'Sullivan	212	−4	4 strokes	(Japan) Seiji Ebihara (Northern Ireland) Eddie Polland
