= West of Ireland Seniors Championship =

Tournament information
- Location: Limerick, Ireland
- Established: 1998
- Course: East Clare Golf Club
- Par: 71
- Tour: European Seniors Tour
- Format: Stroke play
- Prize fund: £85,000
- Month played: August
- Final year: 1998

Tournament record score
- Aggregate: 205 John Morgan (1998)
- To par: −8 as above

Final champion
- (England) John Morgan
- Location in Ireland

The West of Ireland Seniors Championship was a men's senior (over 50) professional golf tournament on the European Seniors Tour, held at the East Clare Golf Club in Bodyke, County Clare, Ireland. It was held just once, in August 1998, and was won by John Morgan who finished a shot ahead of Denis O'Sullivan.

== Winners ==
Year	Winner	Score	To par	Margin of victory	Runner-up
1998	(England) John Morgan	205	−8	1 strokes	(Republic of Ireland) Denis O'Sullivan
