= Dan Technology Senior Tournament of Champions =

Tournament information
- Location: Knutsford, England
- Established: 1996
- Courses: Mere Golf and Country Club
- Par: 71
- Length: 6,579 yards (6,016 m)
- Tour: European Seniors Tour
- Format: Stroke play
- Prize fund: £150,000
- Month played: June
- Final year: 2001

Tournament record score
- Aggregate: 204 Tommy Horton (1997)
- To par: −12 as above

Final champion
- (Jamaica) Delroy Cambridge
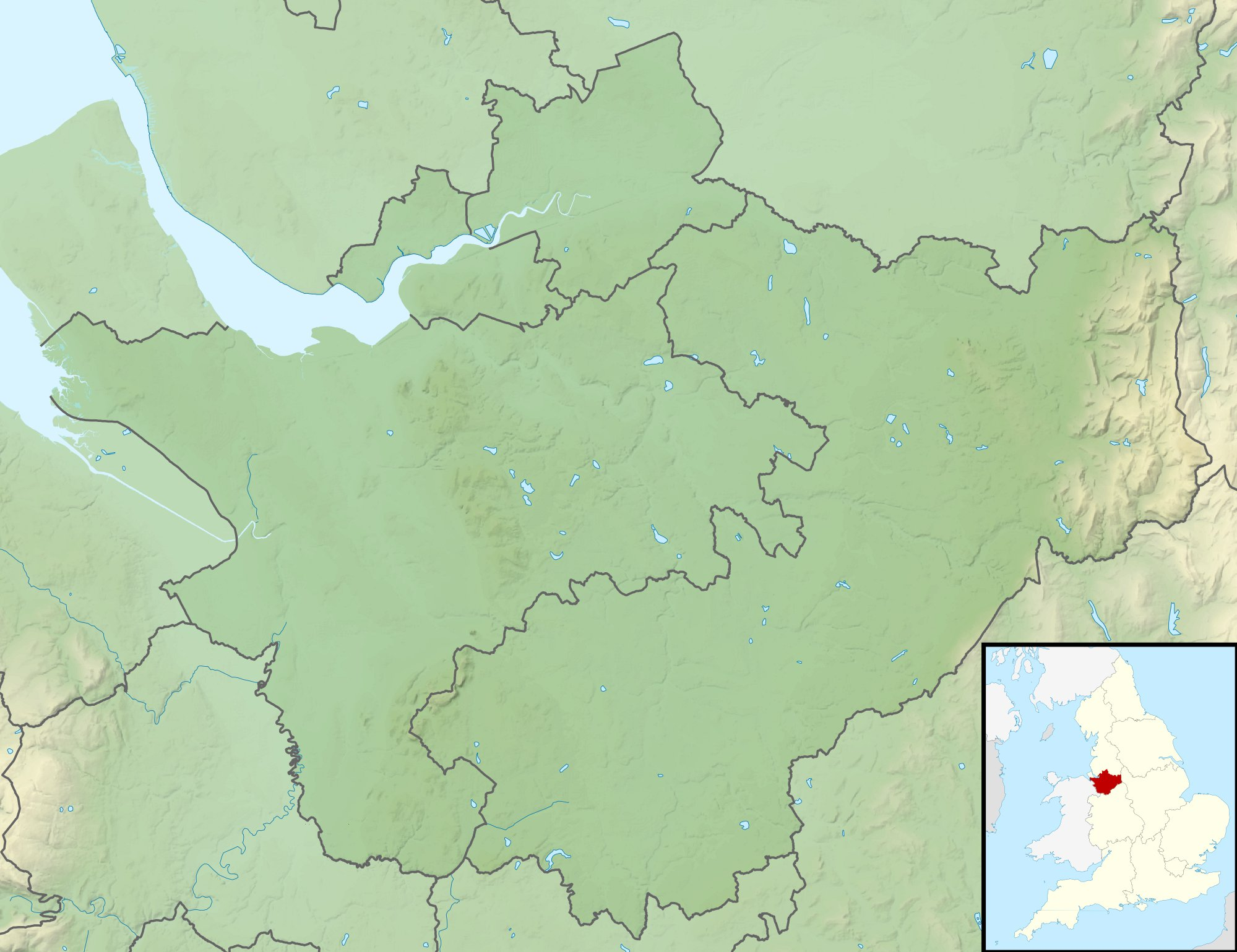
- Location in England Location in Cheshire

The Dan Technology Senior Tournament of Champions was a senior (over 50s) men's professional golf tournament on the European Senior Tour. It was played from 1996 to 2001. From 1996 to 2000 it was held at Buckinghamshire Golf Club, Denham, Buckinghamshire while in 2001 it was played at Mere Golf and Country Club, Mere, Cheshire, England. The 2001 event had total prize of £150,000 with the winner receiving £25,000.

== Winners ==
Year	Winner	Score	To par	Margin of victory	Runner(s)-up	Venue	Ref.
Dan Technology Senior Tournament of Champions
2001	(Jamaica) Delroy Cambridge	205	−8	1 stroke	(United States) Jerry Bruner	Mere	
2000	(Republic of Ireland) Denis O'Sullivan	205	−11	1 stroke	(England) Maurice Bembridge (England) Nick Job (Australia) Ross Metherell	Buckinghamshire	
Senior Tournament of Champions
1999	(Northern Ireland) Eddie Polland	212	−4	2 strokes	(Republic of Ireland) Liam Higgins (England) Tommy Horton	Buckinghamshire	
1998	(England) John Garner	139 (Note: Shortened to 36 holes due to weather.)	−5	1 stroke	(Republic of Ireland) Liam Higgins (Northern Ireland) Eddie Polland	Buckinghamshire	
1997	(England) Tommy Horton (2)	204	−12	3 strokes	(Spain) José María Cañizares	Buckinghamshire	
The Players Championship
1996	(England) Tommy Horton	206	−10	2 strokes	(England) Malcolm Gregson (South Africa) Gary Player	Buckinghamshire	
