= 1993 European Seniors Tour =

Golf tour season

1993 European Seniors Tour season
- Duration: 21 May 1993 – 9 October 1993
- Number of official events: 11
- Most wins: (England) Tommy Horton (3)
- Order of Merit: (England) Tommy Horton

The 1993 European Seniors Tour was the second season of the European Seniors Tour, the main professional golf tour in Europe for men aged 50 and over.

== Schedule ==
The following table lists official events during the 1993 season.

Date	Tournament	Host country	Purse (£)	Winner (Note: The number in brackets after each winner's name is the number of European Seniors Tour events they had won up to and including that tournament. This information is only shown for European Seniors Tour members.)	Notes
23 May	Gary Player Seniors Classic	Wales	50,000	(England) Neil Coles (2)	
13 Jun	Northern Electric Seniors	England	55,000	(Wales) Brian Huggett (3)	
20 Jun	La Bresse Seniors	France	40,000	(England) Bryan Carter (n/a) (Note: Shortened to 18 holes due to weather. Due to the event's length, this win is not officially recognized as a European Seniors Tour victory.)	
23 Jun	Léman International Senior Trophy	Switzerland	100,000	(United States) Phil Ferranti (1)	
4 Jul	Shell Scottish Seniors Open	Scotland	100,000	(England) Tommy Horton (2)	New tournament
25 Jul	Senior British Open	England	220,000	(New Zealand) Bob Charles (1)	Senior major championship
30 Jul	Lawrence Batley Seniors	England	60,000	(England) Peter Butler (1)	
7 Aug	Forte PGA Seniors Championship	England	55,000	(Wales) Brian Huggett (4)	
15 Aug	Belfast Telegraph Irish Senior Masters	Northern Ireland	55,000	(South Africa) Gary Player (1)	
5 Sep	Collingtree Seniors	England	50,000	(England) Tommy Horton (3)	
9 Oct	Senior Zurich Lexus Trophy	Switzerland	50,000	(England) Tommy Horton (4)	New tournament

== Order of Merit ==
The Order of Merit was based on prize money won during the season, calculated in Pound sterling.

Position	Player	Prize money (£)
1	(England) Tommy Horton	56,935
2	(Wales) Brian Huggett	43,865
3	(South Africa) Bobby Verwey	25,885
4	(England) Brian Waites	21,855
5	(South Africa) John Fourie	20,415
