= Ryder Seniors Classic =

Tournament information
- Location: Stratford-upon-Avon, England
- Established: 1992
- Course: Welcombe Hotel
- Par: 70
- Tour: European Seniors Tour
- Format: Stroke play
- Prize fund: £100,000
- Month played: June
- Final year: 1998

Tournament record score
- Aggregate: 202 Bill Hardwick (1998)
- To par: −8 Neil Coles (1997) −8 Bill Hardwick (1998)

Final champion
- (Canada) Bill Hardwick
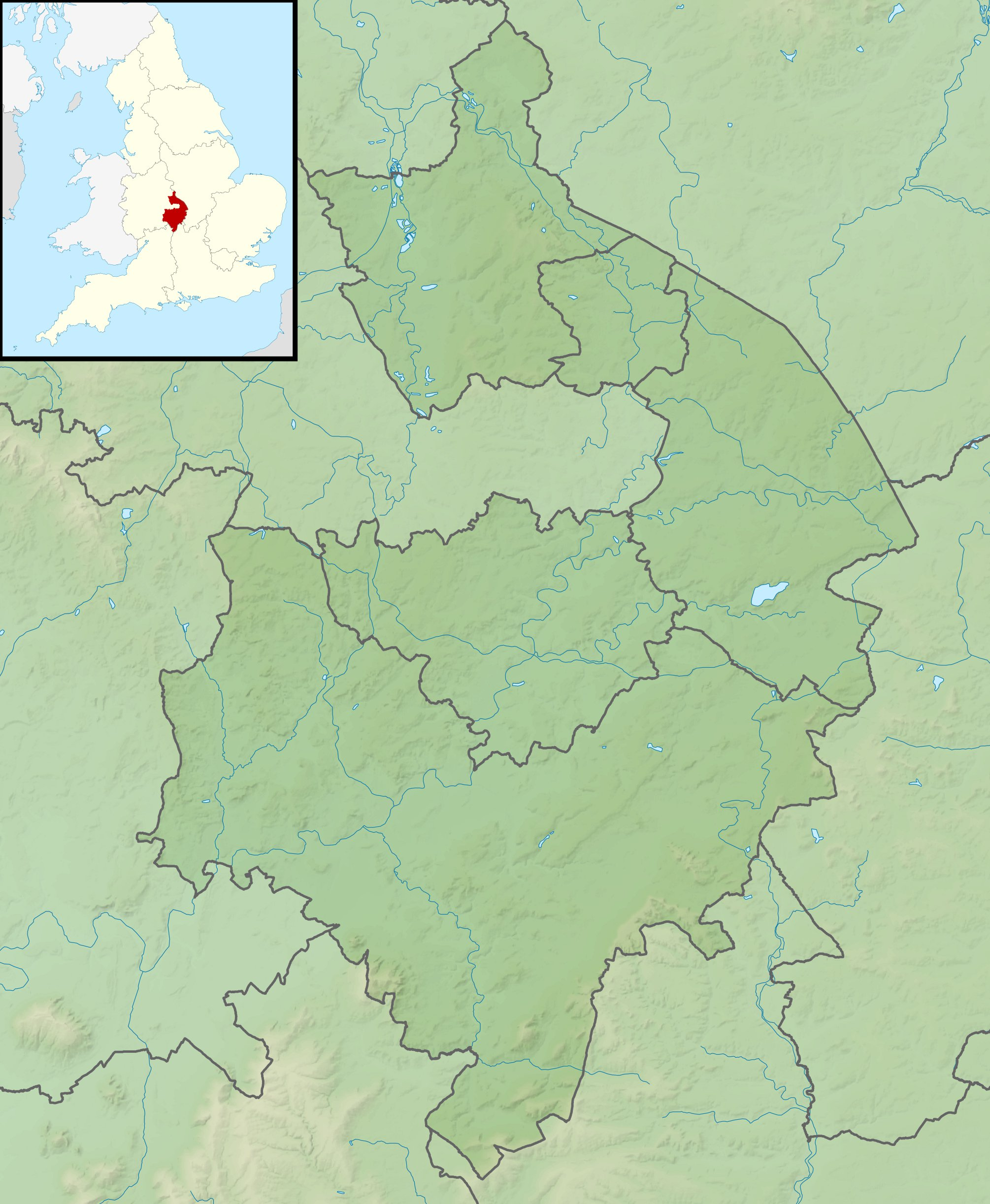
- Location in England Location in Warwickshire

The Ryder Seniors Classic was a men's professional golf tournament on the European Seniors Tour from 1992 to 1998. The tournament was held at Collingtree Park Golf Club near Northampton from 1992 to 1997 and at The Welcombe Hotel, Stratford-upon-Avon, Warwickshire in 1998. Neil Coles won the tournament three times while it was played at Collingtree Park.

== Winners ==
Year	Winner	Score	To par	Margin of victory	Runner(s)-up	Venue	Ref
Ryder Seniors Classic
1998	(Canada) Bill Hardwick	202	−8	2 strokes	(Italy) Renato Campagnoli (England) David Creamer	Welcombe Hotel	
Ryder Collingtree Seniors Classic
1997	(England) Neil Coles (3)	208	−8	7 strokes	(Spain) Antonio Garrido (England) Brian Waites	Collingtree Park	
1996	(Scotland) David Huish	219	+3	Playoff	(England) Malcolm Gregson (Australia) Noel Ratcliffe	Collingtree Park	
Collingtree Seniors
1995	(England) Neil Coles (2)	211	−5	4 strokes	(Scotland) Brian Barnes	Collingtree Park	
Joe Powell Memorial Seniors Classic
1994	(Republic of Ireland) Liam Higgins	210	−6	4 strokes	(England) Malcolm Gregson	Collingtree Park	
Collingtree Seniors
1993	(England) Tommy Horton	212	−4	3 strokes	(England) Roger Fidler (Wales) Brian Huggett	Collingtree Park	
Collingtree Homes Seniors Classic
1992	(England) Neil Coles	218	+2	3 strokes	(South Africa) John Fourie (Northern Ireland) Hugh Jackson	Collingtree Park	
