= Is Molas Senior Open =

Tournament information
- Location: Sardinia, Italy
- Established: 1998
- Course: Is Molas Golf Club
- Par: 72
- Tour: European Seniors Tour
- Format: Stroke play
- Prize fund: £90,000
- Month played: October
- Final year: 1998

Tournament record score
- Aggregate: 209 Malcolm Gregson (1998)
- To par: −7 as above

Final champion
- (England) Malcolm Gregson
- Location in Italy Location in Sardinia

The Is Molas Senior Open was a men's senior (over 50) professional golf tournament on the European Seniors Tour, held at the Is Molas Golf Club in Pula, Sardinia, Italy. It was held just once, in October 1998, and was won by Malcolm Gregson who finished two shots ahead of Tommy Horton. Total prize money was £90,000 with the winner receiving £14,500.

== Winners ==
Year	Winner	Score	To par	Margin of victory	Runner-up
1998	(England) Malcolm Gregson	209	−7	2 strokes	(England) Tommy Horton
