= 1999 European Seniors Tour =

Golf tour season

1999 European Seniors Tour season
- Duration: 7 May 1999 – 24 October 1999
- Number of official events: 17
- Most wins: (England) Neil Coles (2) (England) Tommy Horton (2) (Australia) Ross Metherell (2) (Northern Ireland) Eddie Polland (2) (Australia) Bob Shearer (2)
- Order of Merit: (England) Tommy Horton
- Rookie of the Year: (United States) Jerry Bruner

The 1999 European Seniors Tour was the eighth season of the European Seniors Tour, the main professional golf tour in Europe for men aged 50 and over.

== Schedule ==
The following table lists official events during the 1999 season.

Date	Tournament	Host country	Purse (€)	Winner (Note: The number in brackets after each winner's name is the number of European Seniors Tour events they had won up to and including that tournament. This information is only shown for European Seniors Tour members.)	Notes
9 May	Beko Classic	Turkey	250,000	(England) Tommy Horton (21)	
16 May	AIB Irish Seniors Open	Ireland	250,000	(England) John Morgan (8)	
23 May	MDIS & Partners Festival of Golf	England	110,000	(United States) David Oakley (1)	New tournament
31 May	Philips PFA Golf Classic	England	150,000	(Australia) Bob Shearer (2)	
13 Jun	Jersey Seniors Open	Jersey	140,000	(Northern Ireland) David Jones (1)	
26 Jun	Lawrence Batley Seniors	England	140,000	(Northern Ireland) Eddie Polland (1)	
10 Jul	Elf Seniors Open	France	150,000	(United States) Alan Tapie (1)	
25 Jul	Senior British Open	Northern Ireland	560,000	(Republic of Ireland) Christy O'Connor Jnr (1)	Senior major championship
1 Aug	Energis Senior Masters	England	210,000	(England) Neil Coles (6)	
8 Aug	Bad Ragaz PGA Seniors Open	Switzerland	140,000	(Australia) Bob Shearer (3)	
15 Aug	De Vere Hotels Seniors Classic	England	140,000	(Australia) Ross Metherell (1)	
22 Aug	Dalmahoy Scottish Seniors Open	Scotland	140,000	(England) Neil Coles (7)	
30 Aug	The Belfry PGA Seniors Championship	England	250,000	(Australia) Ross Metherell (2)	
11 Sep	Monte Carlo Invitational	France	175,000	(England) Tommy Horton (22)	New tournament
19 Sep	Ordina Legends in Golf	Netherlands	110,000	(England) Michael Slater (1)	
10 Oct	Greek Seniors Open	Greece	175,000	(Italy) Alberto Croce (2)	New tournament
24 Oct	Senior Tournament of Champions	England	165,000	(Northern Ireland) Eddie Polland (2)	

=== Unofficial events ===
The following events were sanctioned by the European Seniors Tour, but did not carry official money, nor were wins official.

Date	Tournament	Host country	Purse (€)	Winners	Notes
21 Nov	Praia d'El Rey Rover European Cup	Portugal	210,000	Ladies European Tour	Team event

== Order of Merit ==
The Order of Merit was based on prize money won during the season, calculated in Euros.

Position	Player	Prize money (€)
1	(England) Tommy Horton	138,943
2	(Northern Ireland) Eddie Polland	106,977
3	(United States) Jerry Bruner	105,243
4	(England) Neil Coles	98,345
5	(United States) Alan Tapie	91,648

== Awards ==
Award	Winner	Ref.
Rookie of the Year	(United States) Jerry Bruner	
