= Irish Senior Open =

OFX Irish Legends
Tournament information
- Location: Maynooth, Ireland
- Established: 1997
- Courses: Carton House (Montgomerie Course)
- Par: 72
- Length: 6,473 yards (5,919 m)
- Tour: European Senior Tour
- Format: Stroke play
- Prize fund: €400,000
- Month played: July

Tournament record score
- Aggregate: 198 Thomas Bjørn (2021); 198 Phillip Price (2021); 198 Peter Baker (2023)
- To par: −18 Peter Baker (2023)

Current champion
- (Sweden) Johan Edfors

Location map
- Location in Ireland

The Irish Senior Open is the Irish stop on men's golf's European Senior Tour. It was played from 1997 to 2010 and was contested at several different courses around Ireland. From 1997 to 2007 it was sponsored by Allied Irish Banks. In 2021, the tournament was revived as the Irish Legends and was presented by Paul McGinley's foundation.

== Winners ==
Year	Winner	Score	To par	Margin of victory	Runner(s)-up	Venue
OFX Irish Legends
2026	(Sweden) Johan Edfors	199	−17	3 strokes	(England) Robert Coles	Carton House (Montgomerie)
2025	(South Africa) James Kingston	204	−12	1 stroke	(England) Peter Baker (South Africa) Darren Fichardt (South Africa) Keith Horne	Mount Juliet
2024	(Brazil) Adilson da Silva	209	−7	Playoff	(Sweden) Patrik Sjöland	Seapoint
Irish Legends
2023	(England) Peter Baker	198	−18	7 strokes	(Argentina) Ricardo González	Seapoint
2022	(Wales) Phillip Price	213	E	1 stroke	(England) Peter Baker (Italy) Emanuele Canonica (England) Paul Eales (Sweden) Jarmo Sandelin (Denmark) Steen Tinning	Rosapenna (Old Tom Morris)
2021	(Denmark) Thomas Bjørn	198	−15	Playoff	(Wales) Phillip Price	Rosapenna (Old Tom Morris)
2011−2020: No tournament
Handa Irish Senior Open
2010	(France) Marc Farry	206	−10	2 strokes	(Scotland) Ross Drummond	Carton House (Montgomerie)
Irish Seniors Open
2009	(Wales) Ian Woosnam	211	−2	Playoff	(United States) Bob Boyd	Ballybunion (Old)
2008	(Spain) Juan Quirós	212	−1	1 stroke	(Republic of Ireland) Des Smyth	Ballyliffin (Old)
AIB Irish Seniors Open
2007	(Italy) Costantino Rocca	211	−5	2 strokes	(Spain) Juan Quirós (England) Kevin Spurgeon	Slieve Russell
2006	(Scotland) Sam Torrance	207	−6	Playoff	(United States) Jerry Bruner (Chile) Guillermo Encina (Australia) Stewart Ginn	Fota Island
2005	(Australia) Noel Ratcliffe (2)	210	−6	2 strokes	(Argentina) Luis Carbonetti	The Heritage
AIB Irish Seniors Open
2004	(England) Carl Mason	206	−10	1 stroke	(England) Nick Job	Adare Manor
2003	(Australia) Noel Ratcliffe	211	−5	1 stroke	(Jamaica) Delroy Cambridge (Scotland) Martin Gray (United States) Bob Lendzion	Adare Manor
2002	(Japan) Seiji Ebihara (2)	208	−8	2 strokes	(England) Denis Durnian	Adare Manor
2001	(Japan) Seiji Ebihara	207	−9	1 stroke	(New Zealand) Simon Owen	Powerscourt (East)
2000	(United States) Bruce Fleisher	209	−7	3 strokes	(United States) George Burns (Australia) Bob Shearer	Tulfarris
1999	(England) John Morgan	209	−7	1 stroke	(Scotland) Brian Barnes (Australia) Noel Ratcliffe	Mount Juliet
1998	(Republic of Ireland) Joe McDermott	208	−8	Playoff	(Australia) Terry Gale (Australia) Noel Ratcliffe	Woodbrook
1997	(England) Tommy Horton	208	−8	2 strokes	(Australia) Noel Ratcliffe	St Margaret's
