= John Morgan (golfer) =

English golfer (1943–2006)

Personal information
- Full name: John Morgan
- Nationality: England
- Born: 3 September 1943 Oxford, England
- Died: 23 June 2006 (aged 62)
- Height: 5 ft 9 in (1.75 m)

Career
- Sport: Golf
- Turned professional: 1968
- Former tours: European Tour; Champions Tour; European Seniors Tour
- Professional wins: 15

Number of wins by tour
- European Tour: 1
- European Senior Tour: 8 (Tied-8th all-time)
- Other: 5 (regular); 1 (senior)

Best results in major championships
- Masters Tournament: DNP
- PGA Championship: DNP
- U.S. Open: DNP
- The Open Championship: T13: 1974

Achievements and awards
- Tooting Bec Cup: 1974
- Safari Circuit Order of Merit winner: 1979
- European Seniors Tour Order of Merit winner: 1994

John Morgan (3 September 1943 – 23 June 2006) was an English professional golfer who competed on the European Tour in the 1970s and 1980s.

== Career ==
Morgan was born in Oxford. For much of his career, he was also the club professional at Royal Liverpool, one of only a few touring professionals still to maintain a club role at that time. He seriously competed at the 1974 Open Championship. He was tied for the lead with the eventual champion Gary Player after the first round and remained in the top ten after rounds 2 and 3. He ultimately finished T-13. He won one tournament on the European Tour, the 1986 Jersey Open, when he overcame Peter Fowler in a play-off. During the 1970s and 1980s he also competed in Africa on the Safari Circuit, where he won four times, including the Nigerian Open and the Ivory Coast Open. Morgan earned the Safari Circuit Order of Merit winner in 1979.

=== Senior career ===
After turning 50, Morgan played on the European Seniors Tour and the Champions Tour. In 1994, he won the John Jacobs Trophy given to the champion of the European Senior Tour Order of Merit. In 1995 and 1996, he was also runner-up in 1995 and 1996. Morgan won eight European Seniors Tour tournaments including the PGA Seniors Championship twice. He had 59 top-10 finishes, of which 21 were top-3 and 100 top-20 finishes on the European Senior Tour.

== Personal life ==
Morgan died of a brain tumour at the age of 62. He left behind a wife and four children.

== Awards and honors ==
- In 1974, Morgan earned a share of the Tooting Bec Cup trophy, awarded to the British or Irish golfer who had the lowest single round score in that year's Open Championship.
- In 1979, he won the Order of Merit on the Safari Circuit.
- In 1994, Morgan won the John Jacobs Trophy, given to the Order of Merit leader on the European Senior Tour.

== Professional wins (15) ==
=== European Tour wins (1) ===
No.	Date	Tournament	Winning score	Margin of victory	Runner-up
1	15 Jun 1986	Jersey Open	−13 (65-68-71-71=275)	Playoff	(Australia) Peter Fowler

European Tour playoff record (1–0)

No.	Year	Tournament	Opponent	Result
1	1986	Jersey Open	(Australia) Peter Fowler	Won with par on first extra hole

=== Safari Circuit wins (3) ===
- 1979 Nigerian Open, Lusaka Open
- 1982 Ivory Coast Open

=== Other wins (2) ===
- 1986 Sierra Leone Open
- 1992 Cyprus Open

=== European Seniors Tour wins (8) ===
No.	Date	Tournament	Winning score	Margin of victory	Runner(s)-up
1	26 Jun 1994	Northern Electric Seniors	+3 (74-71-74=219)	Playoff	(England) Bernard Hunt
2	29 Jul 1994	Lawrence Batley Seniors	−8 (67-65-70=202)	4 strokes	(Spain) José Maria Roca
3	7 Aug 1994	Forte PGA Seniors Championship	−7 (68-68-67=203)	2 strokes	(England) David Creamer
4	13 Aug 1995	Forte PGA Seniors Championship (2)	−6 (67-70-67=204)	Playoff	(Spain) Antonio Garrido
5	8 Sep 1996	Scottish Seniors Open	−7 (71-68-70=209)	4 strokes	(England) Tommy Horton
6	6 Oct 1996	Motor City Seniors Classic	−3 (72-69-72=213)	2 strokes	(Canada) Bill Hardwick, (England) Tommy Horton, (Australia) Randall Vines
7	16 Aug 1998	West of Ireland Seniors Championship	−8 (67-66-72=205)	1 stroke	(Republic of Ireland) Denis O'Sullivan
8	16 May 1999	AIB Irish Seniors Open	−7 (70-67-72=209)	1 stroke	(Scotland) Brian Barnes, (Australia) Noel Ratcliffe

European Seniors Tour playoff record (2–0)

No.	Year	Tournament	Opponent	Result
1	1994	Northern Electric Seniors	(England) Bernard Hunt	Won with birdie on sixth extra hole
2	1995	Forte PGA Seniors Championship	(Spain) Antonio Garrido	Won with par on first extra hole

=== Other senior wins (1) ===
- 2004 New Zealand Seniors PGA Championship

== Results in major championships ==
Tournament	1968	1969	1970	1971	1972	1973	1974	1975	1976	1977	1978	1979
The Open Championship	CUT					CUT	T13	CUT	T36	T29	CUT	CUT

Tournament	1980	1981	1982	1983	1984	1985	1986	1987	1988	1989	1990
The Open Championship		T31							CUT		CUT

Note: Morgan only played in The Open Championship.

Did not play

CUT = missed the half-way cut (3rd round cut in 1975 Open Championship)
"T" = tied

== Team appearances ==
- PGA Cup/Diamondhead Cup: 1973, 1979 (winners), 1981 (tie)
- Praia d'El Rey European Cup: 1997 (winners), 1999

== See also ==
- List of golfers with most European Senior Tour wins
