= 1998 European Seniors Tour =

Golf tour season

1998 European Seniors Tour season
- Duration: 30 April 1998 – 25 October 1998
- Number of official events: 19
- Most wins: (England) Tommy Horton (3)
- Order of Merit: (England) Tommy Horton
- Rookie of the Year: (Republic of Ireland) Denis O'Sullivan

The 1998 European Seniors Tour was the seventh season of the European Seniors Tour, the main professional golf tour in Europe for men aged 50 and over.

== Schedule ==
The following table lists official events during the 1998 season.

Date	Tournament	Host country	Purse (£)	Winner (Note: The number in brackets after each winner's name is the number of European Seniors Tour events they had won up to and including that tournament. This information is only shown for European Seniors Tour members.)	Notes
3 May	El Bosque Seniors Open	Spain	100,000	(England) Tommy Horton (18)	New tournament
10 May	Beko Classic	Turkey	150,000	(United States) Bob Lendzion (1)	
17 May	AIB Irish Seniors Open	Ireland	87,000	(Republic of Ireland) Joe McDermott (1)	
31 May	Philips PFA Golf Classic	England	100,000	(England) Neil Coles (5)	
7 Jun	Jersey Seniors Open	Jersey	70,000	(Australia) Bob Shearer (1)	
14 Jun	De Vere Hotels Seniors Classic	England	90,000	(England) Tommy Horton (19)	
21 Jun	Ryder Seniors Classic	England	100,000	(Canada) Bill Hardwick (1)	
27 Jun	Swedish Seniors	Sweden	80,000	(England) Maurice Bembridge (2)	
4 Jul	Lawrence Batley Seniors	England	90,000	(South Africa) Bobby Verwey (3)	
26 Jul	Credit Suisse Private Banking Seniors Open	Switzerland	100,000	(South Africa) Bobby Verwey (4)	
2 Aug	Schroder Senior Masters	England	150,000	(Wales) Brian Huggett (8)	
9 Aug	Senior British Open	Northern Ireland	375,000	(Wales) Brian Huggett (9)	Senior major championship
16 Aug	West of Ireland Seniors Championship	Ireland	85,000	(England) John Morgan (7)	New tournament
31 Aug	The Belfry PGA Seniors Championship	England	175,000	(England) Tommy Horton (20)	
6 Sep	Golden Charter PGA Scottish Seniors Open	Scotland	150,000	(Scotland) David Huish (2)	
20 Sep	Efteling European Trophy	Netherlands	100,000	(Northern Ireland) Paul Leonard (1)	New tournament
26 Sep	Elf Seniors Open	France	95,000	(England) Brian Waites (4)	
17 Oct	Is Molas Senior Open	Italy	90,000	(England) Malcolm Gregson (3)	New tournament
25 Oct	Senior Tournament of Champions	England	120,000	(England) John Garner (1)	

=== Unofficial events ===
The following events were sanctioned by the European Seniors Tour, but did not carry official money, nor were wins official.

Date	Tournament	Host country	Purse (£)	Winners	Notes
15 Nov	Praia d'El Rey European Cup	Portugal	n/a	Tied	Team event

== Order of Merit ==
The Order of Merit was based on prize money won during the season, calculated in Pound sterling.

Position	Player	Prize money (£)
1	(England) Tommy Horton	127,656
2	(Wales) Brian Huggett	102,382
3	(Northern Ireland) Eddie Polland	92,145
4	(Northern Ireland) David Jones	74,133
5	(Australia) Noel Ratcliffe	69,528

== Awards ==
Award	Winner	Ref.
Rookie of the Year	(Republic of Ireland) Denis O'Sullivan	
