= Malcolm Gregson =

English golfer (1943–2024)

Personal information
- Full name: Malcolm Edward Gregson
- Nationality: England
- Born: 15 August 1943 Leicester, England
- Died: 24 January 2024 (aged 80) Southport, England
- Height: 5 ft 11 in (1.80 m)

Career
- Sport: Golf
- Turned professional: 1961
- Former tours: European Tour; Safari Circuit; European Seniors Tour
- Professional wins: 12

Number of wins by tour
- European Senior Tour: 5
- Other: 7

Best results in major championships
- Masters Tournament: T35: 1968
- PGA Championship: DNP
- U.S. Open: DNP
- The Open Championship: T19: 1964

Achievements and awards
- Harry Vardon Trophy: 1967

Malcolm Edward Gregson (15 August 1943 – 24 January 2024) was an English professional golfer. After a promising start to his career as an amateur and assistant professional, he had one exceptional year, 1967, when he won the Harry Vardon Trophy and played in the Ryder Cup, but had only limited success afterwards. After reaching 50 he played on the European Senior Tour, winning five times.

== Early life and amateur career ==
In 1943, Gregson was born in Leicester, England. He was educated at Millfield School in Somerset, England from 1957 to 1960. In 1957, he reached the last-16 of the Boys Amateur Championship, a week after his 14th birthday. In 1959, he represented England boys in their annual match against Scotland, played just before the Boys Championship.

In 1960, he again played for England boys against Scotland and was also selected for a combined England and Scotland team to play a Continental Europe team.

== Professional career ==
In 1961, Gregson turned professional. He became an assistant professional to Pat Keene at Moor Park Golf Club. In 1963, he reached quarter-finals of the News of the World Match Play and was runner-up, with Tony Jacklin, in the Coombe Hill Assistants' Tournament. In 1964, he won the Gor-Ray Cup, the assistants' championship. The event was reduced to 54 holes after the second round was abandoned because of bad weather, Gregson winning by three strokes from Richard Davies and Hedley Muscroft. Later in the year he had a top-20 finish in the Open Championship and was runner-up in the Gleneagles Hotel Foursomes Tournament.

In early 1967, Gregson played in Asia and Africa. In April, he had a run of success. At the start of the month he finished tied for fourth place in the Taiwan Open, a tournament on the Far East Circuit. Two week later he lost to Kenji Hosoishi in a playoff for the Indian Open and he then finished third in the Kenya Open the following week. Returning to England he won the Schweppes PGA Championship at the end of the month, with rounds of 67 and 65 on the final day to beat Irishman Hugh Boyle by three strokes. In June, he won the Daks Tournament at Wentworth, beating Neil Coles by two strokes, after final day rounds of 67 and 66, and was a joint winner of the Martini International with Brian Huggett. Qualification for the British team for the 1967 Ryder Cup was based on a points system using performances in 1966 and 1967, finishing after the 1967 Open Championship. Despite having few points in 1966, Gregson's three wins lifted to eighth in the list to gain a place in the team. He did not get an automatic entry into the Open championship, having finished outside the top-30 in the Order of Merit in 1966. After rounds of 76 and 73 he was qualified after getting through an 8-man playoff for two places. In the Ryder Cup, Gregson lost all four matches he played in, the Americans winning the cup by 15 points. He collected the Harry Vardon Trophy as leader of the Order of Merit, which was based on a points system, and also made his only appearance for England in the World Cup which was played in Mexico City a few weeks after the Ryder Cup. Playing with Peter Alliss they finished tied for 13th place in the team event but Gregson finished tied for 6th in the individual standings.

In 1968, Gregson won the Daks Tournament for the second successive year. He had a final round 69 to finish a stroke ahead of Neil Coles. In October he qualified for the PGA Tour through their Qualifying school. Gregson played on the 1969 PGA Tour from February to May but had limited success. He was a runner-up in the 1969 Gallaher Ulster Open behind Christy O'Connor Snr.

Gregson made the top one hundred on the Order of Merit in each of the European Tour's first nine official seasons from 1972 to 1980. He was twice a runner-up in the Dutch Open, in 1972 to Jack Newton and in 1979 to another Australian Graham Marsh. In late 1978 he finished fourth in both Tournament Players Championship and the European Open Championship. In 1972, playing with Brian Huggett, he won the Sumrie Better-Ball at Blairgowrie, a non-tour event. The pair were runners-up in the same event the following year.

Gregson was a regular competitor on the Safari Circuit, winning the 1974 Cock o' the North in Zambia, beating Jack Newton in a playoff. He was runner-up a number of times, including the Kenya Open in 1970 and 1974, the 1972 Zambia Open, the Nigerian Open in 1973 and 1977 and the 1985 Cock o' the North.

Gregson played once on the European Senior Tour in 1993, soon after his 50th birthday and then competed regularly on the tour from 1994, making over 200 appearances before making his final appearance in 2008. He finished in the top 10 of the Order of Merit from 1994 to 1997 and won five events on the tour between 1994 and 2004.

== Personal life ==
Gregson died on 24 January 2024, at the age of 80.

== Awards and honors ==
In 1967, Gregson won the Harry Vardon Trophy, bestowed to the player who has the lowest scoring average on the British PGA over the course of the season.

== Professional wins (12) ==
=== Great Britain and Ireland wins (5) ===
Date	Tournament	Winning score	Margin of victory	Runner(s)-up	Ref.
19 Jun 1964	Gor-Ray Cup	72-71-73=216	3 strokes	(Wales) Richard Davies, (England) Hedley Muscroft	
29 Apr 1967	Schweppes PGA Championship	74-69-67-65=275	3 strokes	(Republic of Ireland) Hugh Boyle	
3 Jun 1967	Daks Tournament	73-73-67-66=279	2 strokes	(England) Neil Coles	
17 Jun 1967	Martini International	71-71-70-67=279	Tied	(Wales) Brian Huggett	
8 Jun 1968	Daks Tournament	72-72-71-69=284	1 stroke	(England) Neil Coles	

=== Safari Circuit wins (1) ===
Date	Tournament	Winning score	Margin of victory	Runner-up	Ref.
17 Mar 1974	Cock o' the North	71-71-72-70=284	Playoff	(Australia) Jack Newton	

=== Other wins (1) ===
- 1972 Sumrie Better-Ball (with Brian Huggett)

=== European Seniors Tour wins (5) ===
No.	Date	Tournament	Winning score	Margin of victory	Runner(s)-up
1	2 Jul 1994	Tandem Stockley Park Seniors Opens	−8 (69-67-69=205)	1 stroke	(England) John Morgan, (Republic of Ireland) Liam Higgins
2	3 Aug 1996	Lawrence Batley Seniors	−4 (69-75-65=209)	2 strokes	(England) Neil Coles, (Italy) Alberto Croce
3	17 Oct 1998	Is Molas Senior Open	−7 (67-73-69=209)	2 strokes	(England) Tommy Horton
4	15 Jun 2003	Irvine Whitlock Jersey Seniors Classic	−13 (69-68-73=203)	3 strokes	(England) Bob Cameron
5	27 Jun 2004	De Vere Northumberland Seniors Classic	−6 (69-68-73=210)	2 strokes	(Japan) Seiji Ebihara

European Seniors Tour playoff record (0–3)

No.	Year	Tournament	Opponent(s)	Result
1	1994	La Manga Spanish Seniors Open	(Wales) Brian Huggett, (England) David Snell	Huggett won with eagle on first extra hole
2	1996	Ryder Collingtree Seniors Classic	(Scotland) David Huish, (Australia) Noel Ratcliffe	Huish won with par on first extra hole
3	1997	Credit Suisse Private Banking Seniors Open	(England) Brian Waites	Lost to birdie on second extra hole

== Results in major championships ==
Tournament	1964	1965	1966	1967	1968	1969
Masters Tournament					T35	
The Open Championship	T19	CUT	T47	T51	T27	CUT

Tournament	1970	1971	1972	1973	1974	1975	1976	1977	1978	1979
Masters Tournament										
The Open Championship		T25	CUT	CUT	T51	CUT	T42	CUT	CUT	CUT

Tournament	1980	1981	1982	1983
Masters Tournament				
The Open Championship	CUT			CUT

Note: Gregson never played in the U.S. Open or PGA Championship.

Did not play

CUT = missed the half-way cut (3rd round cut in 1969 and 1975 Open Championships)
"T" = tied

== Team appearances ==
Amateur

- Boys' match v Continent of Europe (representing combined England & Scotland): 1960 (winners)
- England–Scotland boys match (representing England): 1959, 1960 (winners)

Professional

- Ryder Cup (representing Great Britain): 1967
- World Cup (representing England): 1967
- R.T.V. International Trophy (representing England): 1967 (winners)
- Double Diamond International (representing England): 1975
- Praia d'El Rey European Cup: 1997 (winners)

== See also ==
- Fall 1968 PGA Tour Qualifying School graduates
- List of golfers with most European Senior Tour wins
