= Scottish Senior Open =

Tournament information
- Location: Aberdeen, Scotland
- Established: 1993
- Course: Royal Aberdeen Golf Club
- Par: 71
- Length: 6,857 yards (6,270 m)
- Tour: European Senior Tour
- Format: Stroke play
- Prize fund: €270,000
- Month played: September

Tournament record score
- Aggregate: 199 Anders Forsbrand (2012)
- To par: −17 as above

Current champion
- (France) Thomas Levet

Final champion
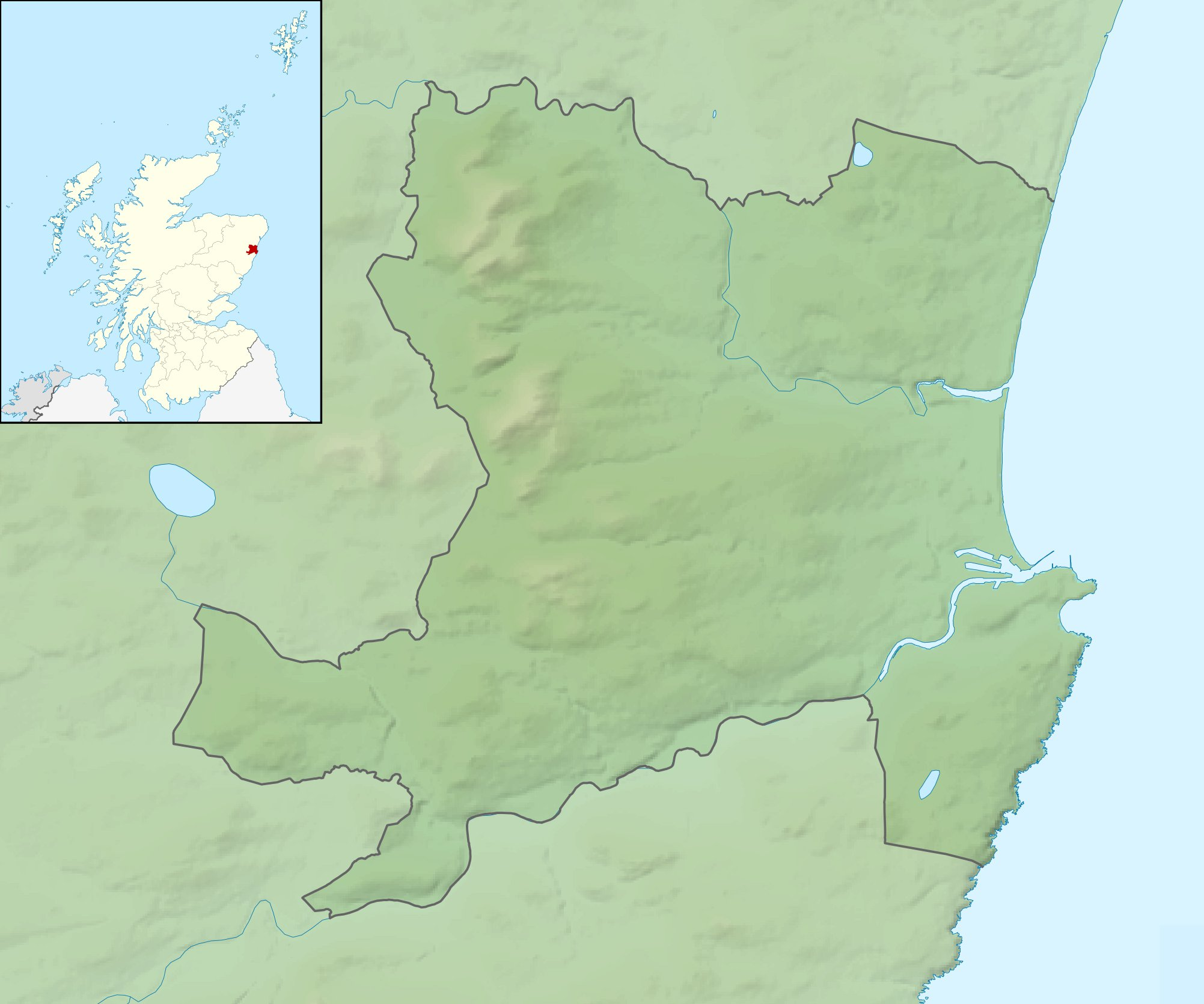
- Location in Scotland Location in Aberdeen

The Scottish Senior Open is a men's professional golf tournament for players aged 50 and above which is part of the European Senior Tour. It was founded in 1993. The 2018 event was held at Craigielaw Golf Club, Longniddry, Scotland.

== Winners ==
Year	Winner	Score	To par	Margin of victory	Runner(s)-up	Venue
Scottish Senior Open
2023	(Scotland) Derek Paton	213	−3	1 stroke	(Scotland) Paul Moultrie (Scotland) Alan Hogg (England) Richard Jones	Stirling
2021	(France) Thomas Levet	204	−9	Playoff	(Austria) Markus Brier	Royal Aberdeen
2020: No tournament
2019	(Scotland) Paul Lawrie	211	−2	2 strokes	(England) Peter Baker (Australia) Peter Fowler	Craigielaw
2018	(Scotland) Gary Orr	209	−4	1 stroke	(England) Paul Streeter	Craigielaw
2017	(England) Paul Broadhurst (2)	200	−13	3 strokes	(Australia) Mike Harwood	Renaissance Club
Prostate Cancer UK Scottish Senior Open
2016	(England) Paul Eales	205	−11	1 stroke	(Australia) Peter Fowler (Spain) Santiago Luna	Archerfield Links (Fidra Course)
2015	(England) Paul Broadhurst	209	−7	Playoff	(Austria) Gordon Manson	Archerfield Links (Fidra Course)
SSE Scottish Senior Open
2014	(England) Mark Davis	211	−5	5 strokes	(England) Philip Golding (Spain) Pedro Linhart (Argentina) César Monasterio (England) David J. Russell	Fairmont St Andrews (Torrance Course)
2013	(Spain) Santiago Luna	211	−5	1 stroke	(Republic of Ireland) Denis O'Sullivan (Scotland) Sam Torrance	Fairmont St Andrews (Torrance Course)
2012	(Sweden) Anders Forsbrand	199	−17	1 stroke	(England) Philip Golding	Fairmont St Andrews (Torrance Course)
Cleveland Golf/Srixon Scottish Senior Open
2011	(England) Barry Lane (2)	202	−14	2 strokes	(United States) Gary Koch	Fairmont St Andrews (Torrance Course)
2010	(England) Barry Lane	212	−4	4 strokes	(England) Glenn Ralph (England) Jim Rhodes	Fairmont St Andrews (Torrance Course)
2009	(England) Glenn Ralph	208	−8	1 stroke	(England) Bob Cameron (Argentina) Luis Carbonetti	Fairmont St Andrews (Torrance Course)
Scottish Seniors Open
2008	(England) Peter Mitchell	207	−9	2 strokes	(Scotland) Sam Torrance	Marriott Dalmahoy
Charles Church Scottish Seniors Open
2007	(Spain) José Rivero	206	−10	1 stroke	(Scotland) Ross Drummond	Marriott Dalmahoy
2006	(Scotland) Sam Torrance	213	−3	1 stroke	(Scotland) Bill Longmuir	Marriott Dalmahoy
2005	(England) Nick Job	206	−10	1 stroke	(France) Jean Pierre Sallat	The Roxburghe
2004	(Scotland) Bill Longmuir	210	−6	1 stroke	(Scotland) John Chillas (England) Carl Mason	The Roxburghe
2003	(Australia) Terry Gale	205	−11	2 strokes	(England) Nick Job (New Zealand) Barry Vivian	The Roxburghe
2002	(England) Denis Durnian	206	−10	6 strokes	(England) Neil Coles (Scotland) Martin Gray (England) Tommy Horton (United States) Alan Tapie	The Roxburghe
Scottish Seniors Open
2001	(United States) David Oakley	210	−6	Playoff	(England) Keith MacDonald	The Roxburghe
The Scotsman Scottish Seniors Open
2000	(Australia) Noel Ratcliffe	205	−11	1 stroke	(Australia) Trevor Downing	Marriott Dalmahoy
Dalmahoy Scottish Seniors Open
1999	(England) Neil Coles	206	−10	1 stroke	(United States) Jerry Bruner (United States) Jay Dolan	Marriott Dalmahoy
Golden Charter PGA Scottish Seniors Open
1998	(Scotland) David Huish	273	−15	Playoff	(Northern Ireland) David Jones	Marriott Dalmahoy
Scottish Seniors Open
1997	(England) Tommy Horton (2)	132 (Note: Shortened to 36 holes due to the Funeral of Diana, Princess of Wales.)	−12	9 strokes	(United States) Jim Delich	Newmachar
1996	(England) John Morgan	209	−7	4 strokes	(England) Tommy Horton	Newmachar
Shell Scottish Seniors Open
1995	(Wales) Brian Huggett	200	−10	2 strokes	(England) Neil Coles	Royal Aberdeen (Balgownie Course)
1994	(Spain) Antonio Garrido	201	−9	5 strokes	(Italy) Renato Campagnoli (England) Neil Coles	Royal Aberdeen (Balgownie Course)
1993	(England) Tommy Horton	208	−2	5 strokes	(England) Neil Coles (Wales) Brian Huggett	Royal Aberdeen (Balgownie Course)
