= Ross Metherell =

Australian professional golfer (born 1948)

Personal information
- Nationality: Australia
- Born: 30 September 1948 (age 78) Perth, Western Australia

Career
- Sport: Golf
- Turned professional: 1968
- Former tour: European Senior Tour
- Professional wins: 13

Number of wins by tour
- European Senior Tour: 2
- Other: 11

Ross Metherell (born 30 September 1948) is an Australian professional golfer and golf coach. As a touring professional Metherell largely played in his home state of Western Australia, winning dozens of events including the Western Australian Open twice. Starting in the early 1980s Metherell began working as a golf coach which he would do for most of the remainder of his career. Late in his career, however, he had a brief rebirth as a touring professional, winning two events on the European Senior Tour in August 1999.

== Career ==
Metherell is from Perth, Australia. He won the Western Australian trainee title in 1965 and 1966. He turned professional in 1968.

Early in his career, Metherell had much success in local events in Western Australia. In 1971, he won Western Australia PGA Championship. In 1972, he played the Fremantle Open against 80 competitors. The event was played over the course of one day, Sunday 7 May. In the morning round, he tied the course record with a 66. Despite a "lapse" in the afternoon round he went on to defeat Terry Gale by two shots. It was the third time he won the event. The following year, he won the Western Australia PGA and in 1974 he won the Western Australian Open for the first time. Shortly thereafter, Metherell won the Spalding Park Open, held in Spalding, Western Australia, in 1975 and successfully repeated as champion in 1976.

In the mid-1970s, Metherell started producing high finishes in more notable events across Australia. In 1975, he played the Tasmanian Open at Devonport Golf Club. Metherell held a two shot lead over playing partner Stewart Ginn at the 71st hole. He hit his approach into a bunker, however, and bogeyed while Ginn birdied to cancel out the lead. They went into a sudden-death playoff. On the par-4 1st hole Ginn "hit a great drive." Metherell's drive, on the other hand, hit a tree only 200 metres from the tee box. It took him four shots to make the green and he bogeyed. Ginn made a conventional par for the win. In 1976, he played at the South Coast Open. Metherell fired a two-under-par 69 to finish at 278 (−6). It looked like he might enter a playoff as leader Barry Burgess was in trouble on the 72nd hole. However, Burgess was able to save par and win. Metherell tied David Good for second place, one back. In 1978, he seriously challenged for the Western Australian Open once more. Metherell "appeared a certain winner" by the 12th hole of the final round. He had a three stroke lead over Peter Croker while Mike Ferguson and David Galloway were further behind. However, Galloway played a scorching back nine at Mount Lawley course, scoring six birdies for a 30. He finished at 279. Metherell still had the solo lead entering the 16th hole. However, he would drop shots over the course of the 16th and 17th holes to find himself one behind entering the final hole. Needing a birdie to tie Galloway, he instead double-bogeyed. He finished in joint second with Croker and Ferguson, three shots behind.

In 1979 Metherell was rewarded for his good play with admission to Australia's World Cup team. Metherell teamed up with Colin Bishop. The event was held at Glyfada Golf Club in Athens, Greece. In the second round Metherell shot an 80 (+8) while playing partner Colin Bishop shot an 86 (+14). They were at 326 (+38), 44 shots behind the leading American team. After the second round Metherell stated, "That's my worst round in 15 years of competitive golf. I still can't believe it actually happened. I kept getting tangled up with the trees and once dropped five strokes in two holes. I had a couple of triple-bogey sevens. I don't want to make excuses, but this course might be ok for the top players, but it's much too tough for the rest." In the fourth and final round Metherell again shot an 80 (+8) and Australia's team finished at 634 (+58). Their team finished in a tie for 25th among 45 teams.

In the 1980s, Metherell largely focused on playing local Western Australian events. In 1982, he won the Spalding Park Open for the third time. Like he did in the 1970s, he nearly repeated as a back-to-back champion in 1983. However Roger Mackay, then an amateur, defeated him by three shots. Metherell finished solo second. Later in the year he won the Western Australia PGA Championship for the third time. It is estimated that Metherell won 50 tournaments in his regular career.

For the remainder of the 1980s and most of the 1990s, Metherell worked mainly as a golf coach. In 1984, Metherell started working as the official State Men's Coach for Western Australia. He maintained this position for most of the remainder of his career. In the late 1990s, he started to coach touring professionals Stephen Leaney and Greg Chalmers. During this era, he also coached Craig Parry, Roger Mackay, and Kim Felton. Late in his regular career, he did have some success in local Western Australian events. In 1989, he won the Western Australian Open for the second and final time. In 1997, at the age of 48, he won the Nedlands Masters for the first time in 23 years.

=== Senior career ===
In 1998, Metherell turned 50 and was eligible for the senior tours. He subsequently tried out for the European Senior Tour. He was successful and earned full-time status for the 1999 season. In his first seven events, Metherell was not particularly successful, missing the cut twice and failing to record any top-25s. In August, however, he had much success. At the De Vere Hotels Seniors Classic, he shot an opening 66 (−5) to put him one behind David Huish and fellow West Australian Terry Gale. He fired a second round 65 to take a two-stroke lead over the first round leaders and American Bill Brask. In the third and final round he held a one shot lead entering the final hole. He hit his approach into a bunker but managed to get up and down for the win. Brask finished second. Two weeks later he again played excellently. At the Belfry PGA Seniors Championship, he shot a second round 68 (−4) to get into contention. In the third round, he shot a "flawless" 66 to take a one stroke lead over Terry Gale and Michael Slater. In the fourth round, he shot a 71 to again defeat Brask by one shot. In the final tournament of the year, the Senior Tournament of Champions, he recorded his third top-10 of the year. Overall, Metherell finished 8th on the Order of Merit and won nearly 100,000 pounds.

After the season ended, Metherell played in the Praia d'El Rey European Cup, a team event matching men on the European Senior Tour with women on the Ladies European Tour. The event was held at Praia d'El Rey on the Atlantic coast of Portugal. One of Metherell's highlights was a 30-foot holed putt on the 18th hole during the first day "salvage a draw" against Sophie Gustafson and Sofia Grönberg-Whitmore." During Sunday's play, Metherell played against England's Trish Johnson. Johnson took a 4 up lead at the turn but a "dogged" Metherell came back, taking the match to the 18th hole. However, at the last, Johnson made a 12 foot birdie putt to win the match.

After the season ended, Metherell returned to Australia to coach. In March 2000, he came back to Europe. His best performance was late in the season at the Dan Technology Senior Tournament of Champions at Buckinghamshire Golf Club in England. Metherell fired a final round 66 (−6) to take the clubhouse lead with Maurice Bembridge. It looked like he might enter a playoff. However Ireland's Denis O'Sullivan birdied the final three holes to defeat him by a shot. Overall, he recorded four top-10s and finished 24th on the Order of Merit. His 2001 season was far weaker and he would not record any top-10s. He finished outside the top 50 of the Order of Merit for the first time. During this era, Metherell was "plagued by back problems" which hurt his performance. In 2002, he played better, recording thee top-10s and a 33rd placing on the Order of Merit. The following season, 2003, was his final full-time season on tour. In 14 events Metherell did not record any top-25s and finished 81st on the Order of Merit.

Afterwards, Metherell has worked largely as a golf coach. In the mid-2000s, he returned to work as the State Men's Coach for Western Australian. As of 2005, he was the coach of European Tour pro Brett Rumford. In 2011, Metherell coached Western Australia's boys' team for the Australian Junior Amateur Championships and the Junior Interstate Series. During this era, he also coached professionals Jarrod Moseley and Stephen Leaney. In 2011, he retired from working as the State Men's Coach for Western Australia, a position he held for the most part of 28 years. Since this period, Metherell has coached at Whaleback Golf Club and Collier Park Golf Club.

In recent years, he has also played some senior events in the Australasian region. He has played senior events in southeast Asia and Australia.

== Personal life ==
As of 1975, Metherell was married to Pam.

Metherell's interests include music and following Australian rules football.

== Professional wins (13) ==
=== Regular career wins (11) ===
- 1971 Western Australia PGA Championship
- 1972 Fremantle Open
- 1973 Western Australia PGA Championship
- 1974 Western Australian Open, Nedlands Masters
- 1975 Spalding Park Open
- 1976 Spalding Park Open
- 1982 Spalding Park Open
- 1983 Western Australia PGA Championship
- 1989 Western Australian Open
- 1997 Nedlands Masters

=== European Seniors Tour wins (2) ===
No.	Date	Tournament	Winning score	Margin of victory	Runner-up
1	15 Aug 1999	De Vere Hotels Seniors Classic	−13 (66-65-69=200)	1 stroke	(United States) Bill Brask
2	30 Aug 1999	The Belfry PGA Seniors Championship	−12 (71-68-66-71=276)	1 stroke	(United States) Bill Brask

== Playoff record ==
PGA Tour of Australasia playoff record (0–1)

No.	Year	Tournament	Opponent	Result
1	1975	Tasmanian Open	(Australia) Stewart Ginn	Lost to par on first extra hole

== Team appearances ==
- World Cup (representing Australia): 1979
- Praia d'El Rey European Cup: 1999
