= Swedish Seniors =

Tournament information
- Location: Lohja, Sweden
- Established: 1997
- Courses: Fågelbro Golf and Country Club
- Par: 71
- Tour: European Seniors Tour
- Format: Stroke play
- Prize fund: £80,000
- Month played: June
- Final year: 1998

Tournament record score
- Aggregate: 204 Noel Ratcliffe (1997)
- To par: −9 as above

Final champion
- (Australia) Noel Ratcliffe
- Location in Sweden

The Swedish Seniors was a men's professional golf tournament on the European Seniors Tour in 1997 and 1998. The tournament was held at Fågelbro Golf and Country Club on the Island of Värmdö, east of Stockholm, Sweden.

== Winners ==
Year	Winner	Score	To par	Margin of victory	Runner-up	Ref.
Swedish Seniors
1998	(England) Maurice Bembridge	209	−4	Playoff	(England) Jim Rhodes	
Manadens Affarer Seniors Open
1997	(Australia) Noel Ratcliffe	204	−9	7 strokes	(England) Steve Wild	
