= Senior German Open =

Tournament information
- Location: Überlingen, Germany
- Established: 1995
- Course: Golfplatz Owingen-Überlingen
- Par: 72
- Tour: European Seniors Tour
- Format: Stroke play
- Prize fund: £100,000
- Month played: July
- Final year: 1997

Tournament record score
- Aggregate: 201 Tommy Horton (1996)
- To par: −15 as above

Final champion
- (Australia) Noel Ratcliffe

Location map
- Location in Germany Location in Baden-Württemberg

The Senior German Open was a men's senior (over 50) professional golf tournament on the European Seniors Tour. It was held for the first time in July 1995 as the International German PGA Seniors Championship at Golfpark Idstein near Frankfurt am Main, Germany and was the first European Seniors Tour event to be held in Germany.

== Winners ==
Year	Winner	Score	To par	Margin of victory	Runner(s)-up	Venue	Ref.
Senior German Open
1997	(Australia) Noel Ratcliffe	204	−12	2 strokes	(England) David Creamer	Golfplatz Owingen-Überlingen	
Stella Senior Open
1996	(England) Tommy Horton	201	−15	2 strokes	(Australia) Noel Ratcliffe	Golfpark Idstein	
International German PGA Seniors Championship
1995	(Italy) Renato Campagnoli	208	−8	2 strokes	(Italy) Alberto Croce (Wales) Brian Huggett	Golfpark Idstein	
