= Bobby Verwey =

South African professional golfer (born 1941)

Personal information
- Full name: Frank Robert Verwey
- Nationality: South Africa
- Born: 21 January 1941 (age 85) Johannesburg, South Africa
- Height: 1.83 m (6 ft 0 in)

Career
- Sport: Golf
- Turned professional: 1959
- Former tours: European Tour; Southern Africa Tour; European Seniors Tour
- Professional wins: 13

Number of wins by tour
- PGA Tour: 1
- PGA Tour Champions: 1
- European Senior Tour: 4
- Other: 8

Best results in major championships
- Masters Tournament: CUT: 1967
- PGA Championship: T70: 1966
- U.S. Open: T17: 1965
- The Open Championship: T30: 1979

Frank Robert Verwey (born 21 January 1941) is a South African professional golfer.

== Early life ==
Verwey was born in Johannesburg. He is the son of former South African PGA champion Jock Verwey.

== Professional career ==
Verwey won the 1962 German Open and the 1965 Almaden Open Invitational on the PGA Tour. He was a member of the European Tour from 1978 to 1980. He won several professional tournaments in his home country and represented South Africa in the World Cup in 1978 and 1980.

Verwey was 50 years, 5 months and 23 days old when he won the Senior British Open Championship becoming the youngest player to ever win that event. He was a regular on the European Seniors Tour for the first few years after its establishment in 1992, and finished in the top ten on the Order of Merit four times.

== Personal life ==
Verwey is the brother-in-law of South African golf legend Gary Player, who was married to his sister, Vivienne (1937–2021).

== Professional wins ==
=== PGA Tour wins (1) ===
No.	Date	Tournament	Winning score	Margin of victory	Runner-up
1	31 Oct 1965	Almaden Open Invitational	−15 (69-66-67-71=273)	2 strokes	(United States) Billy Martindale

=== South African circuit wins (5) ===
- 1963 Western Province Open
- 1965 Transvaal Open
- 1968 Pepsi Open (South Africa)
- 1969 Transvaal Open
- 1975 Transkei Open (South Africa)

=== Other regular career wins (1) ===
- 1962 German Open

=== Senior PGA Tour wins (1) ===
Legend
Senior major championships (1)
Other Senior PGA Tour (0)

No.	Date	Tournament	Winning score	Margin of victory	Runners-up
1	14 Jul 1991	Seniors' British Open	+1 (70-74-71-70=285)	1 stroke	(New Zealand) Bob Charles, (England) Tommy Horton

=== European Seniors Tour wins (4) ===
No.	Date	Tournament	Winning score	Margin of victory	Runner(s)-up
1	31 Jul 1992	Lawrence Batley Seniors	−8 (65-68-71=204)	6 strokes	(England) David Butler, (England) Peter Butler, (England) Tommy Horton
2	12 May 1996	Beko/Oger Tours Turkish Open	+2 (74-74-70=218)	3 strokes	(England) Tommy Horton
3	4 Jul 1998	Lawrence Batley Seniors (2)	−3 (66-75-69=210)	Playoff	(Spain) Antonio Garrido
4	26 Jul 1998	Credit Suisse Private Banking Seniors Open	−10 (66-66-68=200)	2 strokes	(England) Maurice Bembridge, (England) Tommy Horton

European Seniors Tour playoff record (1–1)

No.	Year	Tournament	Opponent	Result
1	1998	Beko Classic	(United States) Bob Lendzion, (Spain) Antonio Garrido	Lendzion won with birdie on first extra hole
2	1998	Lawrence Batley Seniors	(Spain) Antonio Garrido	Won with par on first extra hole

=== Other senior wins (1) ===
- 2000 Nippon Jurin Senior Open (Japan)

== Results in major championships ==
Tournament	1960	1961	1962	1963	1964	1965	1966	1967	1968	1969
Masters Tournament								CUT		
U.S. Open	53					T17	T22	T18	CUT	CUT
The Open Championship	T43	CUT	CUT	WD	CUT					
PGA Championship							T70			

Tournament	1970	1971	1972	1973	1974	1975	1976	1977	1978	1979	1980
Masters Tournament											
U.S. Open											
The Open Championship										T30	CUT
PGA Championship											

Did not play

CUT = missed the half-way cut
WD = withdrew
"T" indicates a tie for a place

== Senior major championships ==
=== Wins (1) ===
Year	Championship	Winning score	Margin	Runners-up
1991	Seniors' British Open	+1 (70-74-71-70=285)	1 stroke	(New Zealand) Bob Charles, (England) Tommy Horton

== Team appearances ==
- World Cup (representing South Africa): 1978, 1980
- Praia d'El Rey European Cup: 1998 (tie)
