= 1997 European Seniors Tour =

Golf tour season

1997 European Seniors Tour season
- Duration: 8 May 1997 – 19 October 1997
- Number of official events: 17
- Most wins: (England) Tommy Horton (6)
- Order of Merit: (England) Tommy Horton

The 1997 European Seniors Tour was the sixth season of the European Seniors Tour, the main professional golf tour in Europe for men aged 50 and over.

== Schedule ==
The following table lists official events during the 1997 season.

Date	Tournament	Host country	Purse (£)	Winner (Note: The number in brackets after each winner's name is the number of European Seniors Tour events they had won up to and including that tournament. This information is only shown for European Seniors Tour members.)	Notes
10 May	Beko Turkish Seniors Open	Turkey	150,000	(England) Tommy Horton (12)	
18 May	AIB Irish Seniors Open	Ireland	75,000	(England) Tommy Horton (13)	New tournament
1 Jun	Philips PFA Golf Classic	Wales	80,000	(United States) Deray Simon (1)	New tournament
8 Jun	Jersey Seniors Open	Jersey	100,000	(England) Tommy Horton (14)	
15 Jun	De Vere Hotels Seniors Classic	England	80,000	(United States) T. R. Jones (1)	
22 Jun	Ryder Collingtree Seniors Classic	England	90,000	(England) Neil Coles (4)	
28 Jun	Manadens Affarer Seniors Open	Sweden	75,000	(Australia) Noel Ratcliffe (1)	New tournament
5 Jul	Lawrence Batley Seniors	England	80,000	(Spain) Antonio Garrido (2)	
13 Jul	Senior German Open	Germany	100,000	(Australia) Noel Ratcliffe (2)	
27 Jul	Senior British Open	Northern Ireland	350,000	(South Africa) Gary Player (2)	Senior major championship
3 Aug	Shell Wentworth Senior Masters	England	125,000	(South Africa) Gary Player (3)	New tournament
10 Aug	Credit Suisse Private Banking Seniors Open	Switzerland	100,000	(England) Brian Waites (3)	New tournament
25 Aug	The Belfry PGA Seniors Championship	England	150,000	(United States) Walter Hall (1)	
31 Aug	Motor Seniors Classic	England	75,000	(England) Ian Richardson (1)	
7 Sep	Scottish Seniors Open	Scotland	100,000	(England) Tommy Horton (15)	
14 Sep	Clubhaus Seniors Classic	England	75,000	(England) Tommy Horton (16)	New tournament
19 Oct	Senior Tournament of Champions	England	125,000	(England) Tommy Horton (17)	New tournament

=== Unofficial events ===
The following events were sanctioned by the European Seniors Tour, but did not carry official money, nor were wins official.

Date	Tournament	Host country	Purse (£)	Winners	Notes
16 Nov	Praia d'El Rey European Cup	Portugal	n/a	European Seniors Tour	New team event

== Order of Merit ==
The Order of Merit was based on prize money won during the season, calculated in Pound sterling.

Position	Player	Prize money (£)
1	(England) Tommy Horton	158,427
2	(Australia) Noel Ratcliffe	86,060
3	(Spain) Antonio Garrido	62,671
4	(England) Brian Waites	61,978
5	(England) Jim Rhodes	55,839
