= Lawrence Batley =

British entrepreneur (1911–2002)

Lawrence Batley OBE (15 February 1911 – 26 August 2002) was an entrepreneur and philanthropist who was born in the town of Huddersfield, in the English county of Yorkshire. He pioneered the wholesale cash and carry business in UK, and supported local endeavours in arts, education and sports.

Leaving school at the age of 14, Batley worked in a solicitor's office, the insurance business, the Royal Air Force, and the pharmaceuticals business. His biggest contribution to business was when he founded "Batley's Cash and Carry"; he claims to be the first to use the phrase and the concept of "cash and carry", and his idea became popular, bringing a whole new way of working to retailers across the UK. He put his success down to daily two-hour siestas between 12pm-2pm.

In later life, Batley sponsored the Lawrence Batley Seniors (a veterans golf competition), the Lawrence Batley Stand at the Galpharm Stadium for its first 10 years, the Lawrence Batley Theatre and the National Arts Education Archive at Bretton Hall College (now part of the University of Leeds).

The business has now been taken over by his only child, Rita Firth. Helped by her husband, Bruce Firth, they have sold Batley's Cash and Carry and also sold L.Batley Pet Products, one of the leading pet food distributors in the UK, which the family started after Cash and Carry was sold.

He died in August 2002.
