= 1996 European Seniors Tour =

Golf tour season

1996 European Seniors Tour season
- Duration: 10 May 1996 – 20 October 1996
- Number of official events: 13
- Most wins: (England) Tommy Horton (4)
- Order of Merit: (England) Tommy Horton

The 1996 European Seniors Tour was the fifth season of the European Seniors Tour, the main professional golf tour in Europe for men aged 50 and over.

== Schedule ==
The following table lists official events during the 1996 season.

Date	Tournament	Host country	Purse (£)	Winner (Note: The number in brackets after each winner's name is the number of European Seniors Tour events they had won up to and including that tournament. This information is only shown for European Seniors Tour members.)	Notes
12 May	Beko/Oger Tours Turkish Open	Turkey	150,000	(South Africa) Bobby Verwey (2)	New tournament
2 Jun	De Vere Hotels Seniors Classic	England	75,000	(Italy) Renato Campagnoli (2)	
9 Jun	Hippo Jersey Seniors	Jersey	100,000	(England) Maurice Bembridge (1)	New tournament
16 Jun	Castle Royle European Seniors Classic	England	75,000	(England) Tommy Horton (8)	New tournament
30 Jun	Ryder Collingtree Seniors Classic	England	60,000	(Scotland) David Huish (1)	
14 Jul	Stella Senior Open	Germany	100,000	(England) Tommy Horton (9)	
28 Jul	Senior British Open	Northern Ireland	350,000	(Scotland) Brian Barnes (2)	Senior major championship
3 Aug	Lawrence Batley Seniors	England	75,000	(England) Malcolm Gregson (2)	
18 Aug	Northern Electric Seniors	England	60,000	(England) Tommy Horton (10)	
25 Aug	The Belfry PGA Seniors Championship	England	150,000	(Australia) Terry Gale (1)	
8 Sep	Scottish Seniors Open	Scotland	100,000	(England) John Morgan (5)	
6 Oct	Motor City Seniors Classic	England	80,000	(England) John Morgan (6)	New tournament
20 Oct	The Players Championship	England	120,000	(England) Tommy Horton (11)	New tournament

== Order of Merit ==
The Order of Merit was based on prize money won during the season, calculated in Pound sterling.

Position	Player	Prize money (£)
1	(England) Tommy Horton	133,195
2	(England) John Morgan	69,346
3	(England) Malcolm Gregson	60,090
4	(Australia) Noel Ratcliffe	49,062
5	(United States) David Oakley	47,430
