= Eddie Polland =

Northern Irish professional golfer (born 1947)

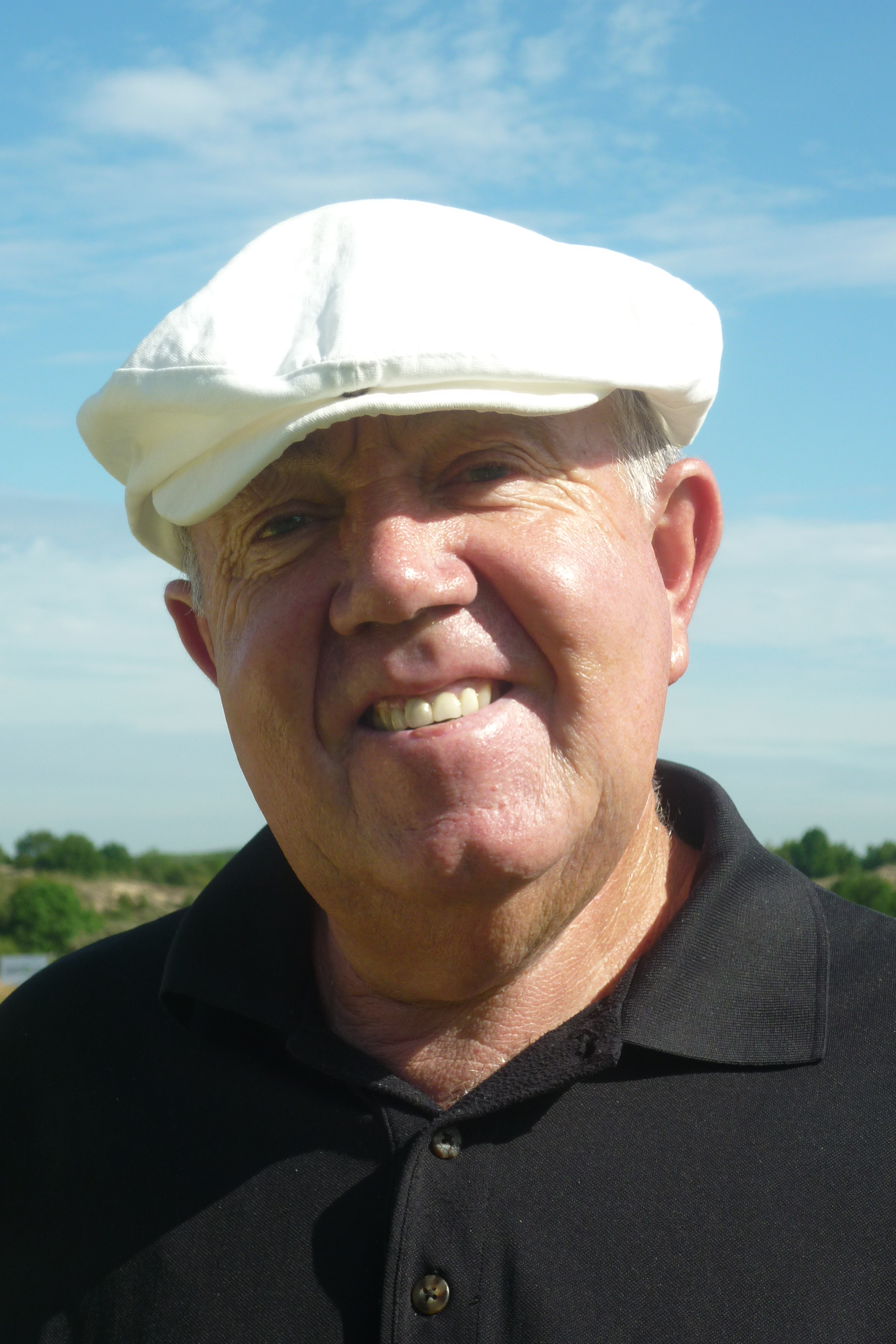

Personal information
- Full name: Edward Polland
- Nationality: Northern Ireland
- Born: 10 June 1947 (age 79) Newcastle, County Down, Northern Ireland
- Height: 5 ft 11 in (1.80 m)

Career
- Sport: Golf
- Turned professional: 1968
- Current tour: European Seniors Tour
- Former tour: European Tour
- Professional wins: 11

Number of wins by tour
- European Tour: 4
- European Senior Tour: 2
- Other: 5

Best results in major championships
- Masters Tournament: DNP
- PGA Championship: DNP
- U.S. Open: DNP
- The Open Championship: T18: 1973

Edward Polland (born 10 June 1947) is a Northern Irish professional golfer.

== Career ==
Polland was born in Newcastle, County Down.

In 1968, Polland turned professional. He won four times on the European Tour between 1973 and 1980. He played in the Ryder Cup in 1973.

After turning 50 he played on the European Seniors Tour, winning twice. He was third in the European Seniors Tour Order of Merit in 1998 and second in 1999.

== Professional wins (11) ==
=== European Tour wins (4) ===
No.	Date	Tournament	Winning score	Margin of victory	Runner(s)-up
1	12 May 1973	Penfold-Bournemouth Tournament	−3 (66-69-72-74=281)	2 strokes	(England) Doug Sewell
2	6 Sep 1975	Sun Alliance Match Play Championship	23 holes		(England) Peter Butler
3	24 Apr 1976	Spanish Open	−6 (72-68-72-70=282)	2 strokes	(Australia) Bob Shearer
4	4 May 1980	Benson & Hedges Spanish Open (2)	−12 (70-69-68-69=276)	5 strokes	(Spain) Seve Ballesteros, (England) Mark James

European Tour playoff record (0–1)

No.	Year	Tournament	Opponents	Result
1	1979	Welsh Golf Classic	(England) Mark James, (Scotland) Mike Miller	James won with par on third extra hole Polland eliminated by birdie on second hole

=== Other wins (5) ===
- 1970 Carroll's Irish Match Play Championship
- 1971 Parmeco Classic
- 1973 Irish Dunlop Tournament
- 1974 Irish PGA Championship
- 1975 Irish Dunlop Tournament

=== European Seniors Tour wins (2) ===
No.	Date	Tournament	Winning score	Margin of victory	Runner(s)-up
1	26 Jun 1999	Lawrence Batley Seniors	−9 (66-66-72=204)	2 strokes	(Spain) Antonio Garrido
2	24 Oct 1999	Senior Tournament of Champions	−4 (69-71-72=212)	2 strokes	(Republic of Ireland) Liam Higgins, (England) Tommy Horton

European Seniors Tour playoff record (0–3)

No.	Year	Tournament	Opponent(s)	Result
1	1998	Schroder Senior Masters	(England) Neil Coles, (Wales) Brian Huggett	Huggett won with birdie on first extra hole
2	1998	Senior British Open	(Wales) Brian Huggett	Lost to par on first extra hole
3	2003	Wallonia Open	(United States) Hank Woodrome	Lost to par on first extra hole

== Playoff record ==
Senior PGA Tour playoff record (0–1)

No.	Year	Tournament	Opponent	Result
1	1998	Senior British Open	(Wales) Brian Huggett	Lost to par on first extra hole

== Results in major championships ==
Tournament	1970	1971	1972	1973	1974	1975	1976	1977	1978	1979	1980	1981	1982	1983	1984	1985	1986
The Open Championship	CUT	CUT	CUT	T18	CUT	CUT	CUT	CUT				T53		CUT		CUT	CUT

Note: Polland only played in The Open Championship.

Did not play

CUT = missed the half-way cut (3rd round cut in 1974, 1977 and 1985 Open Championships)
"T" indicates a tie for a place

== Team appearances ==
- Ryder Cup (representing Great Britain & Ireland): 1973
- World Cup (representing Ireland): 1973, 1974, 1976, 1977, 1978, 1979
- Double Diamond International (representing Ireland): 1972, 1973, 1974, 1975, 1976, 1977
- Marlboro Nations' Cup (representing Ireland): 1973
- Sotogrande Match/Hennessy Cognac Cup (representing Great Britain and Ireland): 1974 (winners), 1976 (winners), 1978 (winners), 1980 (winners)
- Datsun International (representing Great Britain and Ireland): 1976
- Praia d'El Rey European Cup: 1998 (tie), 1999
