= Praia d'El Rey European Cup =

Golf competition in Portugal

Tournament information
- Location: Praia d'El Rey, Portugal
- Established: 1997
- Course: Club de Golfe Praia d'El Rey
- Tours: European Seniors Tour; Ladies European Tour
- Format: Team
- Prize fund: €210,000
- Month played: November
- Final year: 1999

Final champion
- Ladies European Tour
- Location in Portugal

The Praia d'El Rey European Cup was an annual professional golf tournament played at Praia d'El Rey, Portugal. It was played in 1997, 1998 and 1999 between teams of men representing the European Seniors Tour and ladies representing the Ladies European Tour. There was no handicap but the men and women played off different tees.

The men won the first event 13–7 in 1997 and retained the cup in 1998 after a 10–10 tie. The ladies won the final event 11–9 in 1999. Tommy Horton and Marie-Laure de Lorenzi were the captains on each occasion.

== Results ==
Year	Winning team	Score		Losing team
1997	European Seniors Tour	13	7	Ladies European Tour
1998	European Seniors Tour	10	10	Ladies European Tour
1999	Ladies European Tour	11	9	European Seniors Tour

== Appearances ==
The following are those who played in at least one of the three matches.

=== European Seniors Tour ===
Player	1997	1998	1999
(England) Tommy Horton (c)	1997	1998	1999
(England) Maurice Bembridge	1997		
(Spain) José María Cañizares	1997		
(England) David Creamer	1997		
(England) Malcolm Gregson	1997		
(Australia) Noel Ratcliffe	1997		
(Spain) Antonio Garrido	1997		1999
(England) John Morgan	1997		1999
(England) Jim Rhodes	1997	1998	
(England) Brian Waites	1997	1998	
(Wales) Brian Huggett		1998	
(Republic of Ireland) Christy O'Connor Jnr		1998	
(Republic of Ireland) Denis O'Sullivan		1998	
(South Africa) Bobby Verwey		1998	
(England) Neil Coles		1998	1999
(Northern Ireland) David Jones		1998	1999
(Northern Ireland) Eddie Polland		1998	1999
(United States) Bill Brask			1999
(United States) Jerry Bruner			1999
(Australia) Ross Metherell			1999
(United States) Alan Tapie			1999

=== Ladies European Tour ===
Player	1997	1998	1999
(France) Marie-Laure de Lorenzi (c)	1997	1998	1999
(Sweden) Maria Hjorth	1997	1998	1999
(England) Trish Johnson	1997	1998	1999
(England) Alison Nicholas	1997	1998	1999
(South Africa) Laurette Maritz	1997		
(Scotland) Kathryn Marshall	1997		
(France) Patricia Meunier-Lebouc	1997		
(England) Joanne Morley	1997		
(Australia) Shani Waugh	1997		
(England) Karen Lunn	1997	1998	
(Scotland) Catriona Matthew		1998	
(Scotland) Mhairi McKay		1998	
(Sweden) Catrin Nilsmark		1998	
(England) Lora Fairclough		1998	1999
(Sweden) Sophie Gustafson		1998	1999
(Spain) Raquel Carriedo			1999
(England) Laura Davies			1999
(Sweden) Sofia Grönberg-Whitmore			1999
(France) Sandrine Mendiburu			1999
