= Denis O'Sullivan (golfer) =

Irish golfer

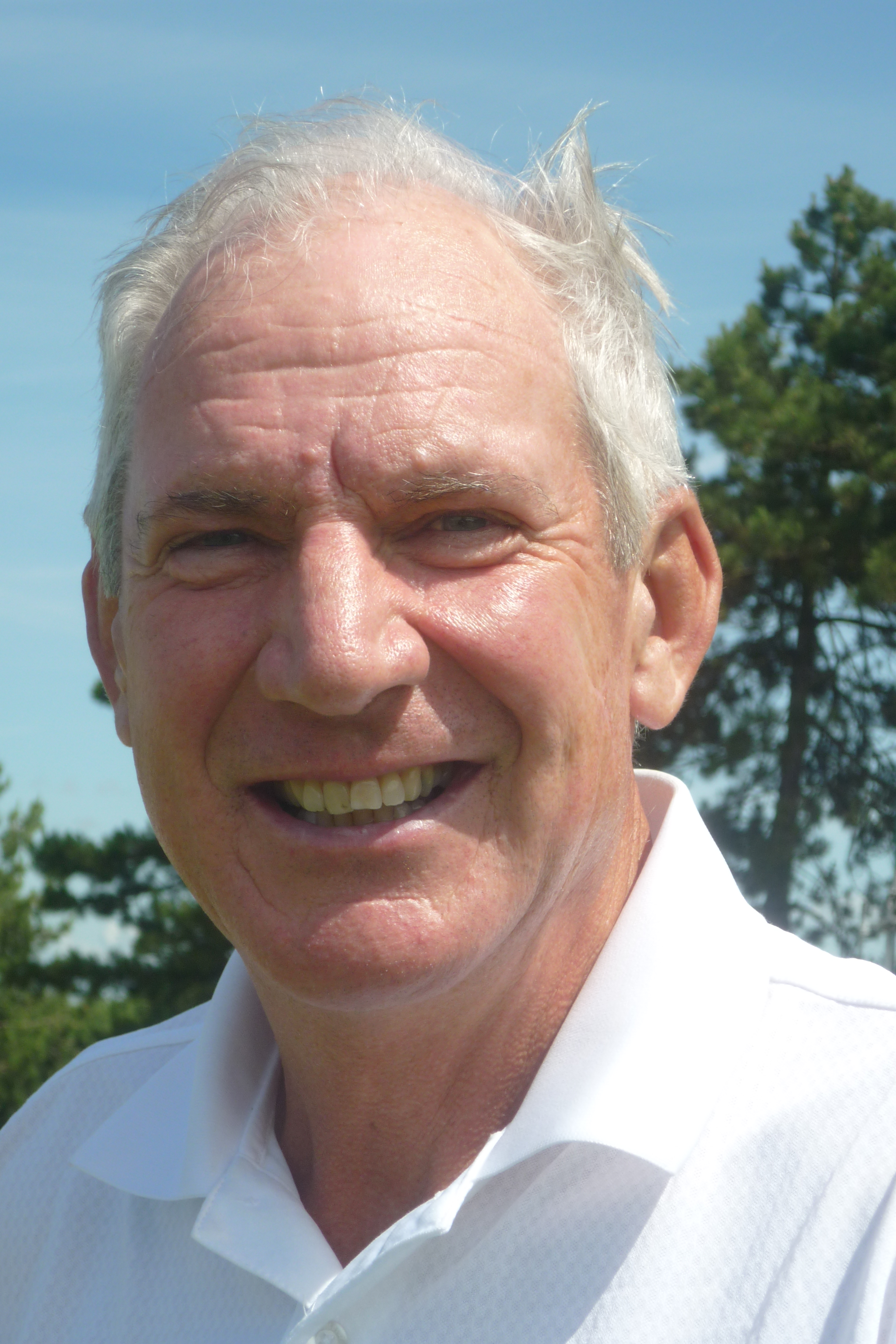

Personal information
- Nationality: Ireland
- Born: 11 March 1948 (age 78) Cork, Ireland
- Height: 1.87 m (6 ft 2 in)
- Weight: 93 kg (205 lb; 14.6 st)

Career
- Sport: Golf
- Turned professional: 1997
- Current tour: European Seniors Tour
- Professional wins: 6

Number of wins by tour
- European Senior Tour: 6

Achievements and awards
- European Seniors Tour Rookie of the Year: 1998

Denis O'Sullivan (born 11 March 1948) is an Irish former professional golfer.

== Career ==
O'Sullivan won the 1985 Irish Amateur Close and the 1990 Irish Amateur Stroke Play, but did not turn professional until 1997, when he decided to try to qualify for the European Seniors Tour. He came through the European Seniors Tour Qualifying School at his first attempt and became one of the tour's most consistent players. He has won six seniors events and finished in the top ten on the Order of Merit several times, with a best ranking of third in 2000.

== Amateur wins ==
- 1985 Irish Amateur Close
- 1990 Irish Amateur Stroke Play

== Professional wins (6) ==
=== European Seniors Tour wins (6) ===
Legend
Tour Championships (1)
Other European Seniors Tour (5)

No.	Date	Tournament	Winning score	Margin of victory	Runner(s)-up
1	22 Oct 2000	Dan Technology Senior Tournament of Champions	−11 (70-69-66=205)	1 stroke	(England) Maurice Bembridge, (England) Nick Job, (Australia) Ross Metherell
2	28 Oct 2000	Abu Dhabi European Seniors Tour Championship	−14 (66-71-65=202)	1 stroke	(Brazil) Priscillo Diniz
3	24 Jun 2001	Palmerston Trophy Berlin	−4 (71-72-69=212)	4 strokes	(Japan) Seiji Ebihara, (Northern Ireland) Eddie Polland
4	15 Jul 2001	STC Scandinavian International	−8 (73-67-65=205)	1 stroke	(England) Maurice Bembridge
5	19 Oct 2002	Tunisian Seniors Open	−14 (68-66-68=202)	2 strokes	(England) John Morgan
6	4 Mar 2005	DGM Barbados Open	−10 (68-68-70=206)	3 strokes	(United States) John Grace

European Seniors Tour playoff record (0–1)

No.	Year	Tournament	Opponent	Result
1	2002	Bad Ragaz PGA Seniors Open	(Japan) Dragon Taki	Lost to par on third extra hole

== Team appearances ==
Amateur

- European Amateur Team Championship (representing Ireland): 1977

Professional

- Praia d'El Rey European Cup: 1998 (tie)

== See also ==
- List of golfers with most European Senior Tour wins
