= Noel Ratcliffe =

Australian professional golfer (1945–2024)

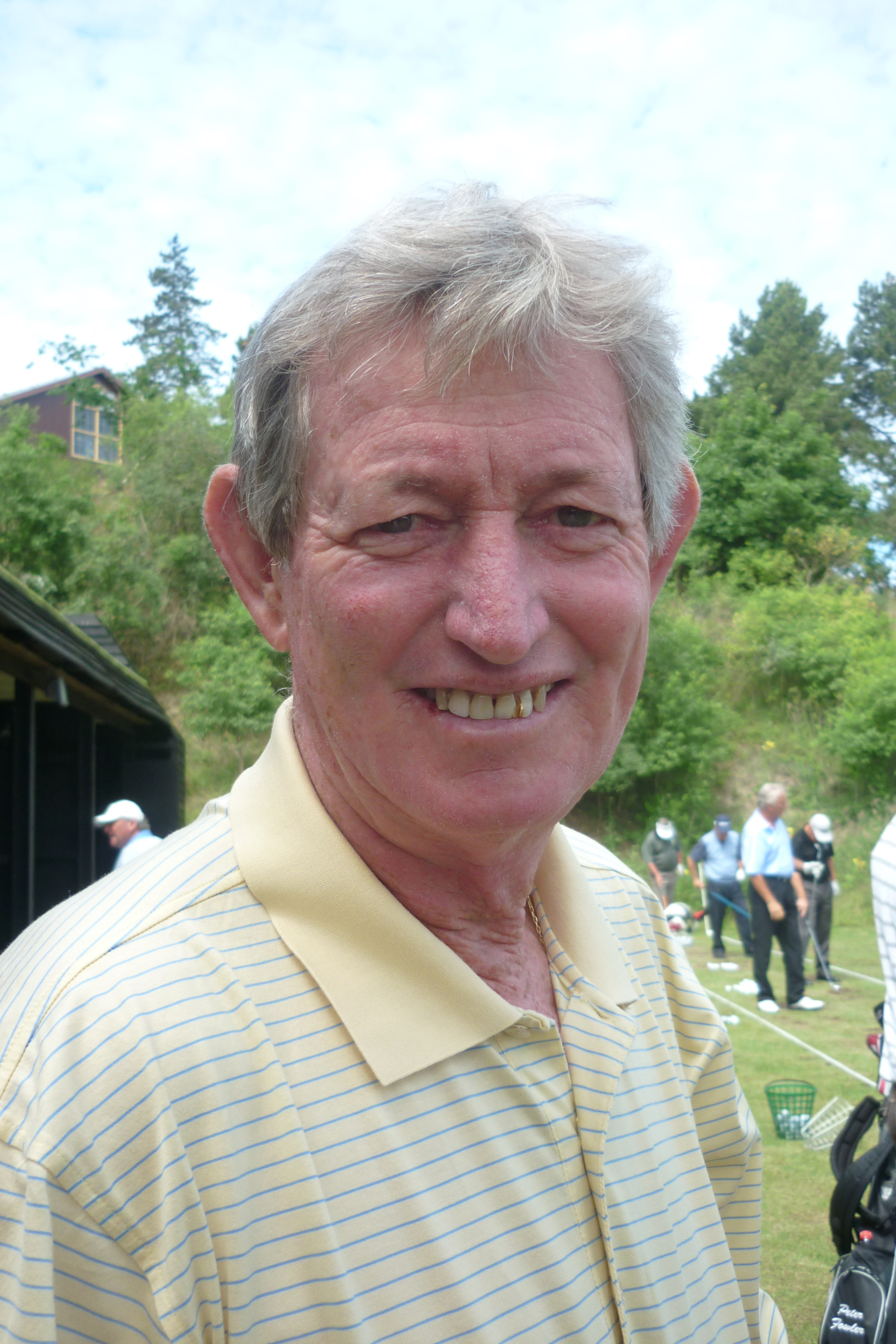
- Ratcliffe at the 2010 Dutch Senior Open

Personal information
- Full name: Noel Anthony Ratcliffe
- Nickname: The Rat
- Nationality: Australia
- Born: 17 January 1945 Sydney, New South Wales, Australia
- Died: April 2024 (aged 79)
- Height: 1.85 m (6 ft 1 in)

Career
- Sport: Golf
- Turned professional: 1974
- Former tours: European Tour; PGA Tour of Australasia; European Seniors Tour
- Professional wins: 18

Number of wins by tour
- European Tour: 2
- PGA Tour of Australasia: 1
- European Senior Tour: 8 (Tied-8th all-time)
- Other: 2 (regular); 5 (senior)

Best results in major championships
- Masters Tournament: DNP
- PGA Championship: DNP
- U.S. Open: DNP
- The Open Championship: T38: 1988

Achievements and awards
- European Seniors Tour Order of Merit winner: 2000

Noel Anthony Ratcliffe (17 January 1945 – April 2024) was an Australian professional golfer.

== Early life and amateur career ==
Ratcliffe turned to golf late for a future professional, and didn't own a set of clubs until he was twenty-one. At university he studied pharmacy and worked for an insurance company and in public service.

== Professional career ==
In 1974, Ratcliffe turned professional. Like many Australian golfers of his era, he divided his time between the PGA Tour of Australia and the European Tour. In his regular career he won three titles in Australasia and two in Europe, where his best year was 1978 when he finished 11th on the Order of Merit.

After turning fifty he was successful on the European Seniors Tour, where he topped the Order of Merit in 2000, made the top five on four other occasions, and won eight tournaments.

== Death ==
Ratcliffe died in April 2024, at the age of 79.

== Amateur wins ==
- 1969 New South Wales Medal
- 1971 New South Wales Medal

== Professional wins (18) ==
=== European Tour wins (2) ===
No.	Date	Tournament	Winning score	Margin of victory	Runner-up
1	11 Jun 1978	Belgian Open	−12 (72-70-72-66=280)	1 stroke	(Australia) Chris Tickner
2	16 Aug 1987	Benson & Hedges International Open	−13 (69-70-70-66=275)	2 strokes	(Sweden) Ove Sellberg

European Tour playoff record (0–1)

No.	Year	Tournament	Opponents	Result
1	1978	Benson & Hedges International Open	(England) Neil Coles, (United States) Lee Trevino	Trevino won with par on fourth extra hole Ratcliffe eliminated by par on first hole

=== PGA Tour of Australasia wins (1) ===
No.	Date	Tournament	Winning score	Margin of victory	Runner-up
1	6 Feb 1977	South Australian Open	−5 (69-68-77-73=287)	Playoff	(Australia) David Galloway

PGA Tour of Australasia playoff record (1–0)

No.	Year	Tournament	Opponent	Result
1	1977	South Australian Open	(Australia) David Galloway	Won with birdie on first extra hole

=== Other wins (2) ===
- 1974 Australian PGA Assistants Championship
- 1976 Huon Open (Papua New Guinea)

=== European Seniors Tour wins (8) ===
No.	Date	Tournament	Winning score	Margin of victory	Runner(s)-up
1	28 Jun 1997	Manadens Affarer Seniors Open	−9 (69-67-68=204)	7 strokes	(England) Steve Wild
2	13 Jul 1997	Senior German Open	−12 (66-69-69=204)	2 strokes	(England) David Creamer
3	3 Sep 2000	The Scotsman Scottish Seniors Open	−11 (68-72-65=205)	1 stroke	(Australia) Trevor Downing
4	24 Sep 2000	TEMES Seniors Open	−5 (71-69-71=211)	2 strokes	(England) Maurice Bembridge, (Republic of Ireland) Denis O'Sullivan
5	5 May 2001	Beko Classic	−7 (69-73-67=209)	1 stroke	(Australia) Terry Gale
6	5 Aug 2001	De Vere Hotels Seniors Classic	−11 (67-71-67=205)	1 stroke	(United States) Jerry Bruner, (New Zealand) Simon Owen
7	18 May 2003	AIB Irish Seniors Open	−5 (69-69-73=211)	1 stroke	(Jamaica) Delroy Cambridge, (Scotland) Martin Gray, (United States) Bob Lendzion
8	5 Jun 2005	AIB Irish Seniors Open (2)	−6 (71-68-71=210)	2 strokes	(Argentina) Luis Carbonetti

European Seniors Tour playoff record (0–2)

No.	Year	Tournament	Opponents	Result
1	1996	Ryder Collingtree Seniors Classic	(England) Malcolm Gregson, (Scotland) David Huish	Huish won with par on first extra hole
2	1998	AIB Irish Seniors Open	(Australia) Terry Gale, (Republic of Ireland) Joe McDermott	McDermott won with birdie on fifth extra hole Ratcliffe eliminated by par on first hole

=== PGA of Australia Legends Tour wins (4) ===
note: this list is probably incomplete

- 2001 Australian PGA Seniors Championship
- 2008 Polygiene Australian PGA Seniors Championship
- 2013 Kiama Legends Pro-Am (with Mike Harwood)
- 2014 Manly Legends/Kids Xpress Charity Pro-Am (with two others)

=== Other senior wins (1) ===
- 1995 Australian Senior Open

== Results in major championships ==
Tournament	1978	1979	1980	1981	1982	1983	1984	1985	1986	1987	1988
The Open Championship	CUT	T41		CUT				CUT			T38

Note: Ratcliffe only played in The Open Championship.

Did not play

CUT = missed the half-way cut (3rd round cut in 1978 and 1981 Open Championships)
"T" = tied

== Team appearances ==
Amateur

- Commonwealth Tournament (representing Australia): 1971
- Eisenhower Trophy (representing Australia): 1972
- Australian Men's Interstate Teams Matches (representing New South Wales): 1970 (winners), 1971, 1973 (winners)

Professional

- Praia d'El Rey European Cup: 1997 (winners)

== See also ==
- List of golfers with most European Senior Tour wins
