= Tommy Horton =

English professional golfer (1941–2017)

Tommy Horton MBE
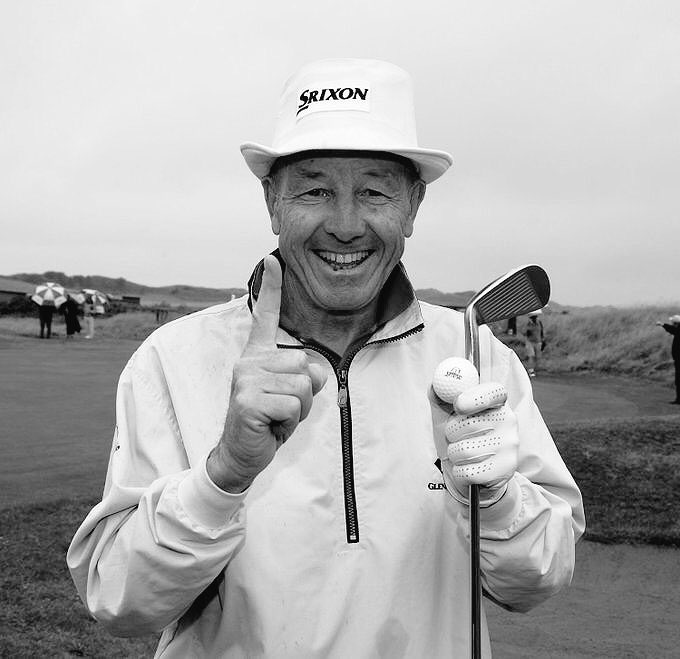

Personal information
- Full name: Thomas Alfred Horton
- Nationality: England
- Born: 16 June 1941 St Helens, Lancashire, England
- Died: 7 December 2017 (aged 76) Jersey, Channel Islands
- Height: 5 ft 8 in (1.73 m)
- Weight: 148 lb (67 kg; 10.6 st)
- Life partner: Helen Horton
- Children: 2

Career
- Sport: Golf
- Turned professional: 1957
- Former tours: European Tour; European Senior Tour
- Professional wins: 41

Number of wins by tour
- European Tour: 4
- European Senior Tour: 23 (2nd all-time)
- Other: 10 (regular); 4 (senior)

Best results in major championships
- Masters Tournament: CUT: 1968, 1969, 1971, 1977
- PGA Championship: DNP
- U.S. Open: DNP
- The Open Championship: T5: 1976

Achievements and awards
- European Seniors Tour Order of Merit winner: 1993, 1996, 1997, 1998, 1999

Thomas Alfred Horton, MBE (16 June 1941 – 7 December 2017) was an English professional golfer. He finished in the top ten of the Open Championship four times, won a number of important tournaments both before and after the founding of the European Tour in 1972 and played in the Ryder Cup in 1975 and 1977. He reached 50 just before the founding of the European Seniors Tour and won 23 times on the tour between 1992 and 2000.

== Career ==
In 1941, Horton was born in St Helens, Merseyside; he moved to Jersey in 1945 and was brought up and educated on the island.

Horton was an assistant at Ham Manor Golf Club near Worthing, Sussex from 1959, later becoming the professional there. In 1974, he moved to Royal Jersey Golf Club. He celebrated 25 years there as professional before his retirement in 1999.

Horton was one of the "Butten boys", a group of British professional golfers who were part of a training programme, funded by Ernest Butten, an entrepreneur and joint founder of PA Consulting Group. Starting in 1963, Butten funded a residential golf school at Sundridge Park in Bromley, Kent. Max Faulkner was employed as the teaching professional.

Horton was runner-up a number of times before his first important win, the R.T.V. International Trophy at Cork Golf Club in August 1968. He had been runner-up in the Carroll's International in 1965 and 1967 and the Martini International earlier in 1968. He was also close to winning the Silentnight Tournament in 1965. Dave Thomas had taken the clubhouse lead. Playing with Jimmy Martin, they reached the final hole with Horton needed a par 4 to beat Thomas while Martin needed a par to tie with Thomas. Martin missed a birdie putt from 10 feet and finished level with Thomas. Horton, however, drove into a bunker, missed a 5-foot putt and took a double-bogey 6 to finish one behind in third place.

Horton won two important tournaments in 1970, the South African Open in February and the Long John Scotch Whisky Match Play Championship in August. He became the first non-South African resident to win the South African Open since it had been first played in 1903, with a three stroke win over Terry Westbrook. In the match play championship he beat Bobby Walker 5&4 in the semi-final before beating another Scot, Ronnie Shade, 3&2 in the final, winning the first prize of £2,000. Horton had been four down against Neil Coles after 10 holes in their quarter-final match but came back to win on the 18th.

Horton played on the European Tour for many years with moderate success, winning four titles and finishing fifth on the Order of Merit in 1976 and tenth in both 1974 and 1978. His biggest win on the tour came in the 1978 Dunlop Masters. Needing a par-3 on the 245-yard final hole at St Pierre, Horton missed the green but holed a 10-foot putt for a one stroke win over Dale Hayes, Graham Marsh and Brian Waites, taking the first prize of £8,000.

Horton had been in contention for a Ryder Cup place as early as 1965. That year he was 11th in the Ryder Cup points list before the final qualifying event, the Esso Golden Tournament, with the leading 10 making the team. However he finished last in the tournament and dropped to 14th place. From 1969 the Ryder Cup team was partly chosen by a selection committee. Horton was a strong candidate in 1969 and 1971 but was not selected until 1975 at Laurel Valley Golf Club. Four members of the 12-man team were selected by committee and with two US-based players chosen, Tony Jacklin and Peter Oosterhuis, there were only two places for the remaining players. Despite finishing 15th in the points list, Horton was selected, making his debut at the age of 34. Horton lost his three pairs matches but on the final day he halved his match against Hale Irwin in the morning singles and beat Lou Graham in the afternoon. Horton played again in 1977 at Royal Lytham. He was 5th in the Ryder Cup points list and gained an automatic spot for the first time. He lost the three matches he played, all by the same score, 5&4.

The European Seniors Tour was founded shortly after he reached its minimum age of fifty, and Horton was the dominant player in its early seasons, topping the money list in 1993, 1996, 1997, 1998 and 1999. He was top of the tour's career money list for many years, before being overtaken by Carl Mason in 2007. Mason equalled Horton total of 23 victories in 2010 and had his 24th win the following year. Horton's career winnings on the senior tour exceeded £1,000,000 and he remains second on the list of most wins of the tour.

Horton was captain of the PGA in 1978, captaining the PGA Cup team the same year at St Mellion.

== Awards and honours ==
- Horton won the Order of Merit on the European Senior Tour five times: in 1993, 1996, 1997, 1998, and 1999
- At the 2000 New Year Honours, Horton was awarded an MBE for services to golf,
- In 2012, Horton was made an honorary life member of the European Tour.

== Death ==
Horton was taken ill at the Annual General Meeting of the Royal Jersey Golf Club on 7 December 2017 and died later that evening in hospital.

== Photo gallery ==
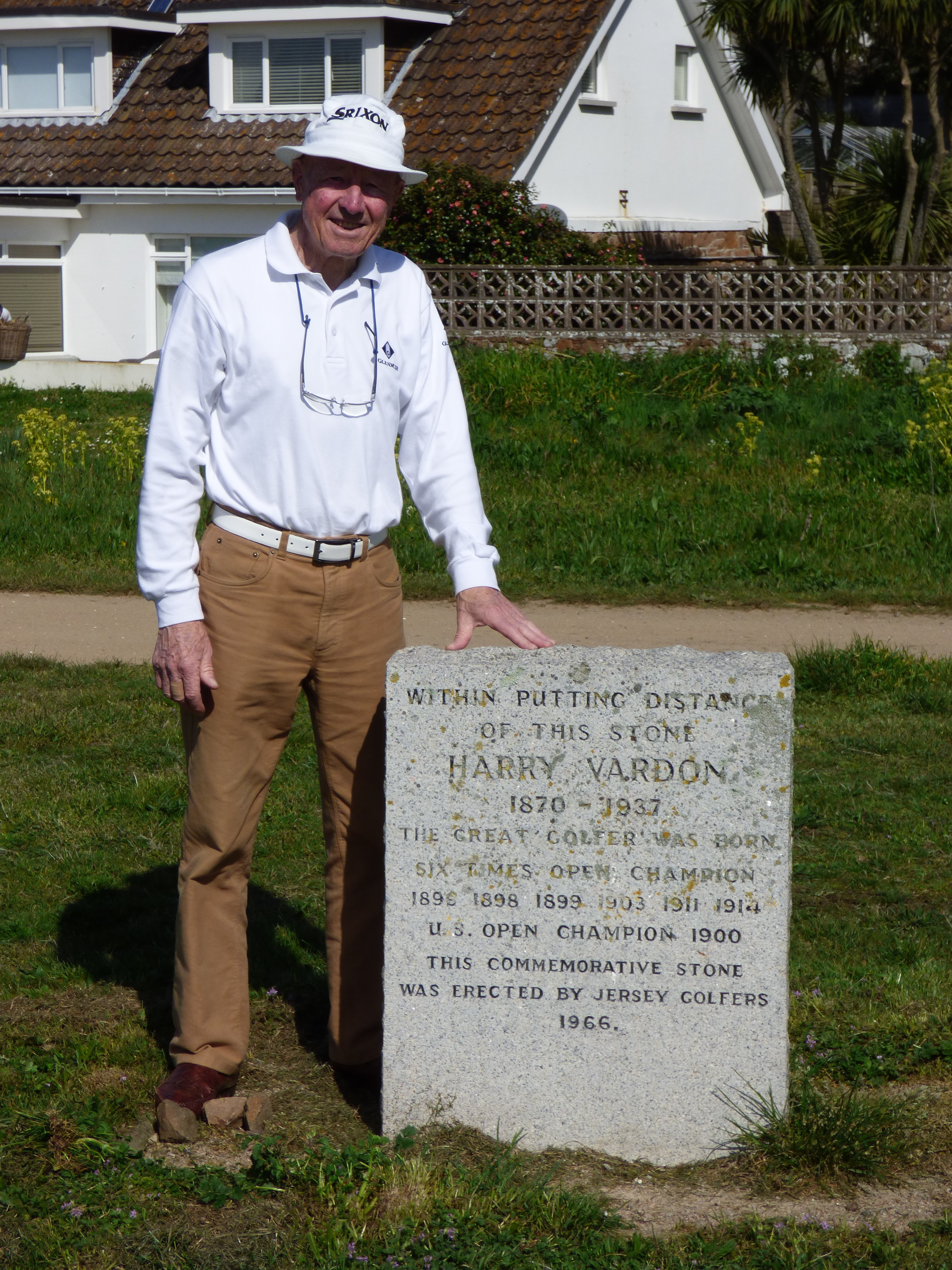
Tommy at the Vardon commemorative stone Royal Jersey G.C.

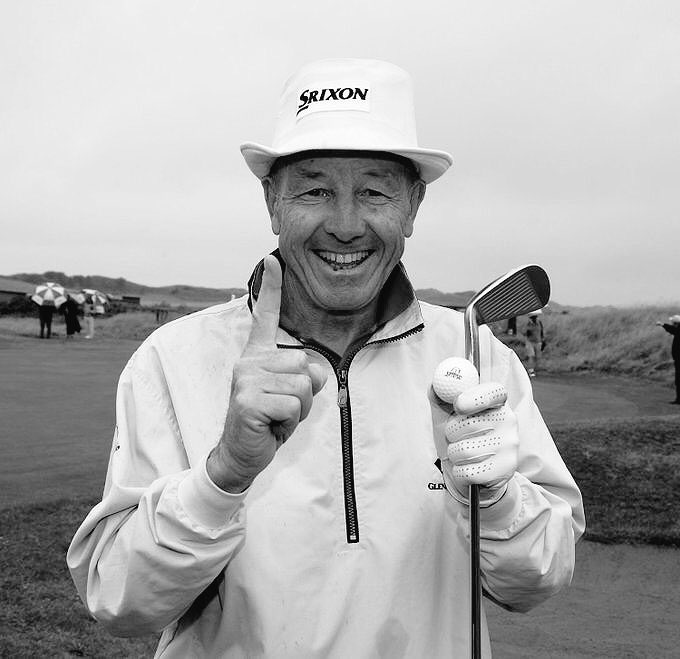
Tommy Horton

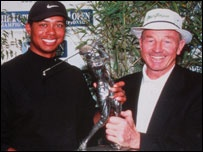
Tiger Woods & Tommy

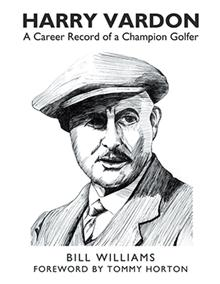
Foreword by Tommy Horton

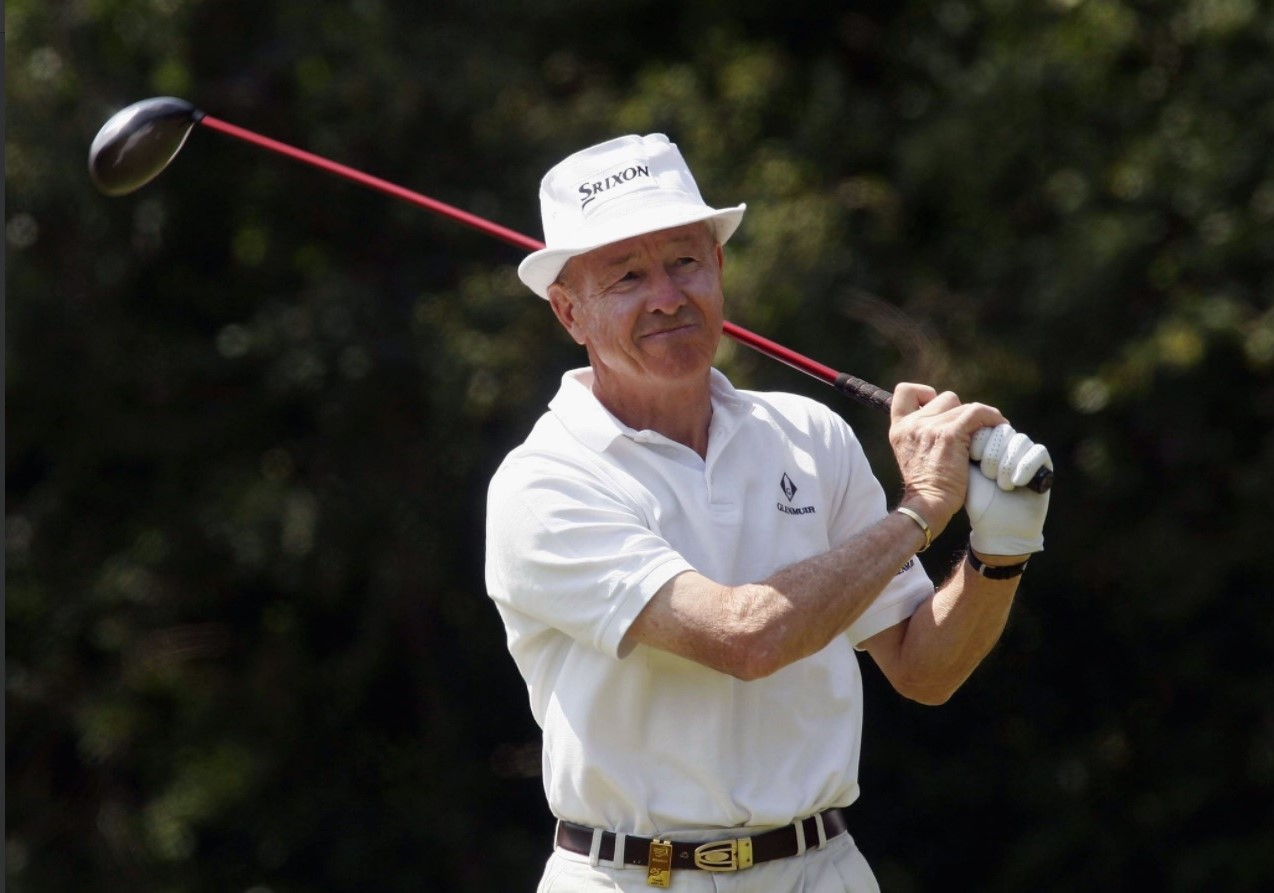
Tommy in full swing

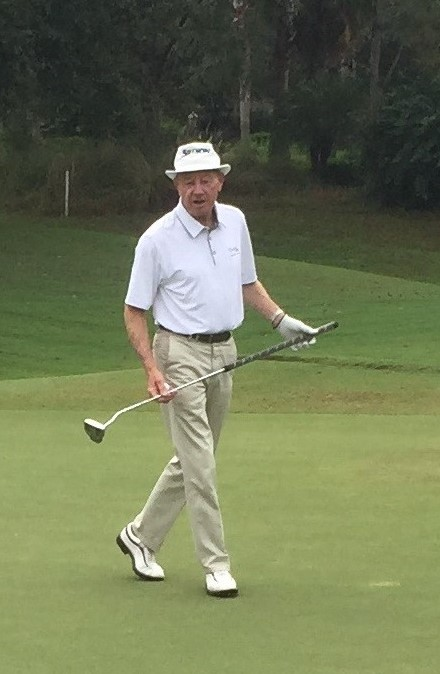
Tommy at the Tony Jacklin Pro-Am Florida 2015

== Professional wins (41) ==
=== European Tour wins (4) ===
No.	Date	Tournament	Winning score	Margin of victory	Runner(s)-up
1	27 Apr 1972	Piccadilly Medal	+13 (80-77=157)	1 stroke	(England) Guy Hunt
2	11 May 1974	Penfold Tournament	−8 (70-68-67-67=272)	1 stroke	(England) Peter Tupling
3	26 Jun 1976	Uniroyal International	−11 (69-72-67-69=277)	1 stroke	(England) Martin Foster
4	7 Oct 1978	Dunlop Masters	−5 (71-70-67-71=279)	1 stroke	(South Africa) Dale Hayes, (Australia) Graham Marsh, (England) Brian Waites

European Tour playoff record (0–1)

No.	Year	Tournament	Opponents	Result
1	1977	Callers of Newcastle	(England) Peter Butler, (South Africa) John Fourie, (Spain) Ángel Gallardo	Fourie won with par on second extra hole Butler and Horton eliminated by par on first hole

=== Safari Circuit wins (1) ===
No.	Date	Tournament	Winning score	Margin of victory	Runners-up
1	27 Mar 1977	Zambia Open	−8 (70-74-70-70=284)	2 strokes	(Scotland) Brian Barnes, (Scotland) Ken Brown, (England) Gary Cullen, (Republic of Ireland) Christy O'Connor Snr, (England) Brian Waites

=== Other African wins (4) ===
- 1970 South African Open
- 1973 Nigerian Open
- 1975 Gambian Open
- 1985 Togo Open

=== Swedish Golf Tour wins (1) ===
No.	Date	Tournament	Winning score	Margin of victory	Runners-up
1	30 Jun 1984	PLM Open	E (73-72-69-74=288)	4 strokes	(England) Denis Durnian, (Sweden) Anders Starkman

=== Other Great Britain and Ireland wins (4) ===
No.	Date	Tournament	Winning score	Margin of victory	Runner(s)-up
1	27 Aug 1968	R.T.V. International Trophy	66-68-68-69=271	3 strokes	(England) Peter Townsend
2	24 Aug 1969	Tyneside Festival of Golf	70-73-73=216	1 stroke	(Wales) Dave Thomas, (Australia) Peter Thomson
3	29 Aug 1970	Long John Scotch Whisky; Match Play Championship	3 & 2 in final		(Scotland) Ronnie Shade
4	26 Jun 1971	Gallaher Ulster Open	67-70-70-67=274	1 stroke	(England) Neil Coles

=== European Seniors Tour wins (23) ===
No.	Date	Tournament	Winning score	Margin of victory	Runner(s)-up
1	9 Aug 1992	Forte PGA Seniors Championship	+2 (74-68-74-74=290)	Playoff	(England) Tony Grubb, (Republic of Ireland) Christy O'Connor Snr
2	4 Jul 1993	Shell Scottish Seniors Open	−2 (69-71-68=208)	5 strokes	(England) Neil Coles, (Wales) Brian Huggett
3	5 Sep 1993	Collingtree Seniors	−4 (69-72-71=212)	3 strokes	(England) Roger Fidler, (Wales) Brian Huggett
4	9 Oct 1993	Senior Zurich Lexus Trophy	E (74-67-75=216)	Playoff	(South Africa) John Fourie, (Puerto Rico) David Jimenez
5	15 May 1994	St Pierre Seniors Classic	−4 (71-71-70=212)	3 strokes	(Wales) Brian Huggett
6	13 Aug 1994	Belfast Telegraph Irish Senior Masters	−5 (68-71-69=208)	Playoff	(Italy) Renato Campagnoli
7	10 Sep 1995	De Vere Hotels Seniors Classic	−3 (71-69-73=213)	1 stroke	(Spain) Antonio Garrido
8	16 Jun 1996	Castle Royle European Seniors Classic	−11 (68-69-69=205)	Playoff	(Wales) Brian Huggett
9	14 Jul 1996	Stella Senior Open	−15 (66-67-68=201)	2 strokes	(Australia) Noel Ratcliffe
10	18 Aug 1996	Northern Electric Seniors	−7 (67-67-75=209)	4 strokes	(Spain) Antonio Garrido, (Australia) Noel Ratcliffe
11	20 Oct 1996	The Players Championship	−10 (68-69-69=206)	2 strokes	(England) Malcolm Gregson, (South Africa) Gary Player
12	10 May 1997	Beko Turkish Seniors Open	−8 (69-70-69=208)	2 strokes	(England) Maurice Bembridge
13	18 May 1997	AIB Irish Seniors Open	−8 (71-69-68=208)	2 strokes	(Australia) Noel Ratcliffe
14	8 Jun 1997	Jersey Seniors Open	−12 (69-67-68=204)	6 strokes	(Wales) Craig Defoy
15	7 Sep 1997	Scottish Seniors Open (2)	−12 (70-62=132) (Note: Shortened to 36 holes due to the Funeral of Diana, Princess of Wales.)	9 strokes	(United States) Jim Delich
16	14 Sep 1997	Clubhaus Seniors Classic	−13 (68-71-64=203)	2 strokes	(Northern Ireland) David Jones
17	19 Oct 1997	Senior Tournament of Champions (2)	−12 (69-67-68=204)	3 strokes	(Spain) José María Cañizares
18	3 May 1998	El Bosque Seniors Open	−15 (66-67-68=201)	9 strokes	(Australia) Noel Ratcliffe
19	14 Jun 1998	De Vere Hotels Seniors Classic (2)	−5 (68-76-67=211)	1 stroke	(England) Ian Richardson
20	31 Aug 1998	The Belfry PGA Seniors Championship	−11 (69-71-66-71=277)	2 strokes	(Italy) Renato Campagnoli, (England) Jim Rhodes
21	9 May 1999	Beko Classic	−5 (72-70-69=211)	1 stroke	(United States) Alan Tapie
22	11 Sep 1999	Monte Carlo Invitational	E (69-70-68=207)	1 stroke	(United States) Bill Brask, (United States) Jerry Bruner, (United States) Ray Carrasco
23	1 Apr 2000	Royal Westmoreland Barbados Open	−8 (70-70-68=208)	2 strokes	(United States) Jerry Bruner

European Seniors Tour playoff record (4–1)

No.	Year	Tournament	Opponent(s)	Result
1	1992	Forte PGA Seniors Championship	(England) Tony Grubb, (Republic of Ireland) Christy O'Connor Snr	Won with birdie on first extra hole
2	1992	Gary Player Anvil Senior Classic	(Wales) Brian Huggett	Lost to par on fourth extra hole
3	1993	Senior Zurich Lexus Trophy	(South Africa) John Fourie, (Puerto Rico) David Jimenez	Won with birdie on first extra hole
4	1994	Belfast Telegraph Irish Senior Masters	(Italy) Renato Campagnoli	Won with par on second extra hole
5	1996	Castle Royle European Seniors Classic	(Wales) Brian Huggett	Won with birdie on first extra hole

=== Other senior wins (4) ===
- 1995 British Senior Club Professional Championship
- 1996 British Senior Club Professional Championship
- 1997 British Senior Club Professional Championship
- 1998 British Senior Club Professional Championship

== Results in major championships ==
Tournament	1965	1966	1967	1968	1969
Masters Tournament				CUT	CUT
The Open Championship	T17	CUT	T8	T13	T11

Tournament	1970	1971	1972	1973	1974	1975	1976	1977	1978	1979
Masters Tournament		CUT						CUT		
The Open Championship	T9	T37	T40	T31	T31	T19	T5	T9	CUT	CUT

Tournament	1980	1981	1982	1983	1984	1985	1986
Masters Tournament							
The Open Championship	T32	T35	CUT			CUT	74

Note: Horton only played in the Masters Tournament and the Open Championship.

Top 10
Did not play

CUT = missed the half-way cut (3rd round cut in 1979 and 1982 Open Championships)
"T" indicates a tie for a place

=== Summary ===
Tournament	Wins	2nd	3rd	Top-5	Top-10	Top-25	Events	Cuts made
Masters Tournament	0	0	0	0	0	0	4	0
U.S. Open	0	0	0	0	0	0	0	0
The Open Championship	0	0	0	1	4	8	20	15
PGA Championship	0	0	0	0	0	0	0	0
Totals	0	0	0	1	4	8	24	15

- Most consecutive cuts made – 6 (1971 Open Championship – 1976 Open Championship)
- Longest streak of top-10s – 1 (four times)

== Team appearances ==
- Ryder Cup (representing Great Britain and Ireland): 1975, 1977
- World Cup (representing England): 1976
- Double Diamond International (representing England): 1971 (winners), 1974 (winners), 1975, 1976 (winners), 1977
- Sotogrande Match/Hennessy Cognac Cup (representing Great Britain and Ireland): 1974 (winners), 1976 (winners)
- PGA Cup: 1978 (winners, non-playing captain)
- Praia d'El Rey European Cup: 1997 (winners, captain), 1998 (tie, captain), 1999 (captain)

== See also ==
- List of golfers with most European Senior Tour wins
- European Tour tribute video
