= European Senior Tour =

Professional golf tour for men aged 50 and over

Legends Tour
- Current season, competition or edition: 2026 European Senior Tour
- Legends Tour logo
- Formerly: European Seniors Tour; Staysure Tour
- Sport: Golf
- Founded: 1992
- CEO: Phil Harrison
- Countries: Based in Europe (Note: Schedules have also included events in Asia, Africa, Australasia and North America.)
- Most titles: Order of Merit titles: (England) Tommy Horton (5); Tournament wins: (England) Carl Mason (25)
- Broadcaster: Sky Sports (UK)
- Related competitions: European Tour
- Website: https://www.legendstour.com/

The European Senior Tour, currently titled as the Staysure Legends Tour for sponsorship reasons, is a professional golf tour for male golfers aged 50 and over, run by the PGA European Tour. The tour was titled as the Staysure Tour for the 2018 and 2019 seasons after UK-based insurance company Staysure became the first title sponsors of the senior tour in December 2017. The tour was relaunched as the Legends Tour in 2020, after Ryan Howsam, founder and owner of Staysure, took majority ownership in a joint venture with the European Tour. The headquarters are based at Wentworth Golf Club, UK.

In 2025, the tour will play across four continents with a 20-event calendar, which will take place between February and December. Total prize fund for the year will be €20 million.

== History ==
The Tour was founded in 1992 after calls from 60 leading professionals five years after the first Senior Open Championship in 1987. The highest profile event in Europe is the Senior British Open Championship, which is co-sanctioned by PGA Tour Champions and was played on the Old Course at St Andrews for the first time in 2018. The European Tour co-sanctions the Senior PGA Championship and the U.S. Senior Open. Prize money in the latter does not count towards the Order of Merit, but since 2007 the former has been an official money event.

== Order of Merit winners ==
Year	Winner	Points
2025	(Australia) Scott Hend	4,781
2024	(Brazil) Adilson da Silva	3,837
2023	(England) Peter Baker	4,161
2022	(South Africa) James Kingston	2,845
2021	(Wales) Stephen Dodd	1,830
2020	Cancelled due to the COVID-19 pandemic	
2019	(Wales) Phillip Price	2,888
Year	Winner	Prize money (€)
2018	(England) Paul Broadhurst (2)	547,793
2017	(United States) Clark Dennis	222,055
2016	(England) Paul Broadhurst	399,285
2015	(Scotland) Colin Montgomerie (2)	679,147
2014	(Scotland) Colin Montgomerie	624,543
2013	(England) Paul Wesselingh	311,644
2012	(England) Roger Chapman	356,751
2011	(Australia) Peter Fowler	302,327
2010	(Thailand) Boonchu Ruangkit	266,609
2009	(Scotland) Sam Torrance (3)	170,696
2008	(Wales) Ian Woosnam	320,120
2007	(England) Carl Mason (3)	412,376
2006	(Scotland) Sam Torrance (2)	347,525
2005	(Scotland) Sam Torrance	277,421
2004	(England) Carl Mason (2)	354,775
2003	(England) Carl Mason	350,242
2002	(Japan) Seiji Ebihara	330,211
2001	(Australia) Ian Stanley	287,025
2000	(Australia) Noel Ratcliffe	163,164
1999	(England) Tommy Horton (5)	138,943
Year	Winner	Prize money (£)
1998	(England) Tommy Horton (4)	127,656
1997	(England) Tommy Horton (3)	158,427
1996	(England) Tommy Horton (2)	133,195
1995	(Scotland) Brian Barnes	63,620
1994	(England) John Morgan	57,209
1993	(England) Tommy Horton	56,935
1992	(South Africa) John Fourie	47,856

=== Multiple winners ===
Rank	Player	Wins	Years won
1	(England) Tommy Horton	5	1993, 1996, 1997, 1998, 1999
T2	(England) Carl Mason	3	2003, 2004, 2007
T2	(Scotland) Sam Torrance	3	2005, 2006, 2009
T4	(England) Paul Broadhurst	2	2016, 2018
T4	(Scotland) Colin Montgomerie	2	2014, 2015

== Awards ==
Year	Rookie of the Year
2025	(South Africa) Darren Fichardt
2024	(England) Simon Griffiths
2023	(Sweden) Patrik Sjöland
2022	(Brazil) Adilson da Silva
2021	No award
2020	No award
2019	(Scotland) Paul Lawrie
2018	(England) Paul Streeter
2017	(United States) Clark Dennis
2016	(Sweden) Magnus Persson Atlevi
2015	(England) Paul Broadhurst
2014	(Argentina) César Monasterio
2013	(Denmark) Steen Tinning
2012	(England) Paul Wesselingh
2011	(England) Gary Wolstenholme
2010	(Thailand) Boonchu Ruangkit
2009	(Australia) Mike Harwood
2008	(Wales) Ian Woosnam
2007	(Italy) Costantino Rocca
2006	(Spain) José Rivero
2005	(England) Kevin Spurgeon
2004	(United States) Pete Oakley
2003	(England) Carl Mason
2002	(United States) Steve Stull
2001	(New Zealand) Simon Owen
2000	(Brazil) Priscillo Diniz
1999	(United States) Jerry Bruner
1998	(Republic of Ireland) Denis O'Sullivan

== Leading career money winners ==
The table below shows the top ten career money leaders on the European Senior Tour as of the end of the 2018 season.

Rank	Player	Prize money (€)
1	(Germany) Bernhard Langer	2,811,071
2	(England) Carl Mason	2,757,126
3	(Scotland) Colin Montgomerie	1,943,628
4	(England) Nick Job	1,653,634
5	(Australia) Peter Fowler	1,652,178
6	(England) Barry Lane	1,571,534
7	(United States) Tom Watson	1,570,663
8	(Scotland) Sam Torrance	1,560,985
9	(England) Tommy Horton	1,527,506
10	(Scotland) Bill Longmuir	1,472,192

There is a full list that is updated after each tournament on the European Tour's website here.

== See also ==
- List of golfers with most European Senior Tour wins
