= De Vere Northumberland Seniors Classic =

Tournament information
- Location: Slaley Hall, Northumberland, England
- Established: 1995
- Course: Collingtree Park Golf Club
- Par: 72
- Length: 6,837 yards (6,252 m)
- Tour: European Seniors Tour
- Format: Stroke play
- Prize fund: £150,000
- Month played: June
- Final year: 2005

Tournament record score
- Aggregate: 196 David Oakley (2000)
- To par: −17 as above

Final champion
- (England) Carl Mason
- Location in England Location in Northumberland

The De Vere Northumberland Seniors Classic was a men's professional golf tournament on the European Seniors Tour from 1995 to 2005. Until 2002 it was called the De Vere Hotels Seniors Classic.The tournament was held at Belton Woods near Grantham from 1995 to 1998, Ferndown Golf Club, Ferndown, Dorset in 1999 and 2000, and Slaley Hall, near Hexham, Northumberland from 2001 to 2005.

== Winners ==
| Year | Winner | Score | To par | Margin of victory | Runner(s)-up | Venue |
De Vere Northumberland Seniors Classic
| 2005 | (England) Carl Mason | 200 | −16 | 3 strokes | (Republic of Ireland) Eamonn Darcy | Slaley Hall |
| 2004 | (England) Malcolm Gregson | 210 | −6 | 2 strokes | (Japan) Seiji Ebihara | Slaley Hall |
| 2003 | (United States) Jerry Bruner | 202 | −14 | 4 strokes | (Scotland) John Chillas | Slaley Hall |
De Vere Hotels Seniors Classic
| 2002 | (Australia) Brian Jones | 207 | −9 | 7 strokes | (England) Tommy Horton | Slaley Hall |
| 2001 | (Australia) Noel Ratcliffe | 205 | −11 | 1 stroke | (United States) Jerry Bruner (New Zealand) Simon Owen | Slaley Hall |
| 2000 | (United States) David Oakley | 196 | −17 | 4 strokes | (Australia) Noel Ratcliffe | Ferndown |
| 1999 | (Australia) Ross Metherell | 200 | −13 | 1 stroke | (United States) Bill Brask | Ferndown |
| 1998 | (England) Tommy Horton (2) | 211 | −5 | 1 stroke | (England) Ian Richardson | Belton Woods |
| 1997 | (United States) T. R. Jones | 212 | −4 | 1 stroke | (England) Tommy Horton | Belton Woods |
| 1996 | (Italy) Renato Campagnoli | 207 | −9 | 5 strokes | (Spain) Antonio Garrido (England) Tommy Horton | Belton Woods |
| 1995 | (England) Tommy Horton | 213 | −3 | 1 stroke | (Spain) Antonio Garrido | Belton Woods |
