= Seniors Tour Championship =

Golf tournament

OKI Castellón Senior Tour Championship
Tournament information
- Location: Castellón, Spain
- Established: 2000
- Course: Club de Campo del Mediterráneo
- Par: 72
- Length: 6,798 yards (6,216 m)
- Tour: European Senior Tour
- Format: Stroke play
- Prize fund: €400,000
- Month played: November
- Final year: 2012

Tournament record score
- Aggregate: 202 Denis O'Sullivan (2000); 202 Carl Mason (2003); 202 Mike Cunning (2010)
- To par: −14 Denis O'Sullivan (2000) −14 Mike Cunning (2010)

Final champion
- (United States) Mike Cunning
- Location in Spain Location in the Valencian Community

The Seniors Tour Championship was the season ending event on men's professional golf's European Seniors Tour. It was first contested in 2000 at Abu Dhabi Golf Club by Sheraton, Abu Dhabi. In 2001 it was played at PGA Golf de Catalunya, Spain, from 2002 to 2004 at Quinta da Marinha, Portugal, in 2005 and 2006 at Riffa Views, Bahrain, in 2007 at Buckinghamshire Golf Club, England and from 2008 to 2010 at Club de Campo del Mediterráneo, Spain. In 2010 the prize fund was €400,000 with €64,433 going to the winner.

== Winners ==
European Senior Tour (Tour Championship)	2000–2010

#	Year	Winner	Score	To par	Margin of victory	Runner(s)-up	Venue
OKI Castellón Senior Tour Championship
11th	2010	(United States) Mike Cunning	202	−14	1 stroke	(Spain) José Rivero	Club de Campo
10th	2009	(Australia) Mike Harwood	203	−13	3 strokes	(Paraguay) Ángel Franco	Club de Campo
OKI Castellón Open España Senior Tour Championship
9th	2008	(Scotland) Sam Torrance	203	−13	2 strokes	(Chile) Ángel Fernández (Japan) Katsuyoshi Tomori	Club de Campo
The Kingdom of Bahrain Trophy Seniors Tour Championship
8th	2007	(Italy) Costantino Rocca	206	−10	1 stroke	(England) Nick Job	Buckinghamshire Club
Arcapita Seniors Tour Championship
7th	2006	(England) Gordon J. Brand	211	−5	Playoff	(Argentina) Adan Sowa	Riffa Views
6th	2005	(Republic of Ireland) Des Smyth	206	−10	2 strokes	(Scotland) John Chillas	Riffa Views
Estoril Seniors Tour Championship
5th	2004	(Scotland) John Chillas	207	−6	2 strokes	(Australia) David Good	Quinta da Marinha
4th	2003	(England) Carl Mason	202	−11	8 strokes	(England) Keith MacDonald (Australia) Noel Ratcliffe (Japan) Dragon Taki	Quinta da Marinha
3rd	2002	(England) Denis Durnian	208	−5	Playoff	(Republic of Ireland) Eamonn Darcy	Quinta da Marinha
European Seniors Tour Championship
2nd	2001	(United States) Jerry Bruner	210	−6	1 stroke	(Australia) David Good	PGA Golf de Catalunya
Abu Dhabi European Seniors Tour Championship
1st	2000	(Republic of Ireland) Denis O'Sullivan	202	−14	1 stroke	(Brazil) Priscillo Diniz	Abu Dhabi
