= Yurio Akitomi =

Japanese professional golfer

Personal information
- Nationality: Japan
- Born: 13 September 1950 (age 76) Saga Prefecture, Japan
- Height: 1.62 m (5 ft 4 in)
- Weight: 54 kg (119 lb; 8.5 st)

Career
- Sport: Golf
- Status: Professional
- Former tour: Japan Golf Tour
- Professional wins: 4

Number of wins by tour
- Japan Golf Tour: 3
- Other: 1

Yurio Akitomi (born 13 September 1950) is a Japanese professional golfer.

== Professional career ==
Akitomi played on the Japan Golf Tour, winning three times.

== Professional wins (4) ==
=== PGA of Japan Tour wins (3) ===
No.	Date	Tournament	Winning score	Margin of victory	Runner(s)-up
1	23 Sep 1979	Kyusyu Open	−5 (71-70-73-69=283)	8 strokes	(Japan) Takeru Sato, (Japan) Isamu Sugita
2	28 Sep 1980	Kyusyu Open (2)	−5 (69-72-72-70=283)	1 stroke	(Japan) Norio Suzuki
3	6 Sep 1981	Kyusyu Open (3)	+1 (71-75-71-72=289)	4 strokes	(Japan) Norio Suzuki, (Japan) Katsuyoshi Tomori

=== Asia Golf Circuit wins (1) ===
No.	Date	Tournament	Winning score	Margin of victory	Runners-up
1	6 Mar 1977	Thailand Open	−4 (69-70-73-72=284)	Playoff	(United States) Marty Bohen, (Japan) Takahiro Takeyasu

Asia Golf Circuit playoff record (1–0)

No.	Year	Tournament	Opponents	Result
1	1977	Thailand Open	(United States) Marty Bohen, (Japan) Takahiro Takeyasu	Won with par on seventh extra hole Takeyasu eliminated by par on second hole
