= Monte Carlo Invitational =

Tournament information
- Location: Mont Agel, France
- Established: 1999
- Course: Monte Carlo Golf Club
- Par: 69
- Length: 6,189 yards (5,659 m)
- Tour: European Seniors Tour
- Format: Stroke play
- Prize fund: €220,000
- Month played: June
- Final year: 2002

Tournament record score
- Aggregate: 197 Terry Gale (2002)
- To par: −10 as above

Final champion
- (England) Neil Coles

Location map
- Location in France Location in Provence-Alpes-Côte d'Azur

The Monte Carlo Invitational is an invitation-only golf tournament held at the at the Monte Carlo Golf Club, La Turbie, Alpes-Maritimes, France. From 1998 to 2002 it was played as a senior (over 50s) men's professional tournament on the European Senior Tour. The course is near Mont Agel, in France, as there are no golf courses in Monaco. The Monte Carlo Open was played at the same venue from 1984 to 1992.

The 2001 event, scheduled for 14–16 September, was cancelled because of the September 11 terrorist attacks.

Following a 25-year hiatus, the historic Monte Carlo Invitational, or Monte Carlo Golf Invitational, is scheduled to resume in May 2027 with a Silver Jubilee edition at the Monte Carlo Golf Club. The edition marks a change from its former European Senior Tour format, with plans to continue the tournament in subsequent years.

The tournament's new chapter is planned to include competitive golf and private events, with partnerships involving organisations in the luxury, private banking and corporate sectors. It is also expected to include patronage initiatives supporting young athletes.

== Winners ==
Year	Winner	Score	To par	Margin of victory	Runner(s)-up	Ref.
GIN Monte Carlo Invitational
2002	(Australia) Terry Gale	197	−10	1 stroke	(England) Keith MacDonald	
Big 3 Records Monte Carlo Invitational
2001	Cancelled					
2000	(United States) John Grace	199	−8	5 strokes	(England) Maurice Bembridge	
Monte Carlo Invitational
1999	(England) Tommy Horton	207	E	1 stroke	(United States) Bill Brask (United States) Jerry Bruner (United States) Ray Carrasco	
