= David Oakley =

American professional golfer (1945–2006)

Personal information
- Full name: David K. Oakley
- Nickname: "Oak"
- Nationality: United States
- Born: April 27, 1945 New York, U.S.
- Died: July 2, 2006 (aged 61) Orlando, Florida, U.S.
- Height: 5 ft 10 in (1.78 m)
- Weight: 175 lb (79 kg; 12.5 st)

Career
- Sport: Golf
- College: University of Florida
- Turned professional: 1970 (reinstated amateur); 1996
- Former tour: European Seniors Tour
- Professional wins: 4

Number of wins by tour
- European Senior Tour: 4

Best results in major championships
- Masters Tournament: DNP
- PGA Championship: DNP
- U.S. Open: CUT: 1973
- The Open Championship: T46: 1972

David K. Oakley (April 27, 1945 – July 2, 2006) was an American professional golfer whose greatest success came on the European Seniors Tour.

== Early life ==
Oakley was born in New York, but grew up in Panama City, Florida. He got started in golf by his mother, who thought a nine-hole course near their home would make a fine babysitter for Oakley and his brother. Oakley was the older brother of American professional golfer Pete Oakley.

== Amateur career ==
Oakley attended the University of Florida in Gainesville, Florida, where he was a walk-on member of coach Buster Bishop's Florida Gators men's golf team from 1965 to 1967. As a Gator golfer, he was a member of teams that won Southeastern Conference (SEC) championships in 1965 and 1967. He graduated from the University of Florida with a bachelor's degree in business administration in 1967.

== Professional career ==
In 1970, Oakley turned pro. He played in Europe, Asia, Canada, and the United States. In 1976, he stopped working as a touring professional to concentrate on a business career unrelated to golf.

== Re-instated amateur status ==
Oakley regained his amateur status during this era. He worked for ten years as a hotel liquidator and then nine years as a furniture store manager.

== Second professional career ==
In 1996, Oakley returned to professional golf and played on various senior circuits. He had much success on the European Senior Tour where he won four times. He was fifth on the European Seniors Tour career money list at one point.

== Personal life ==
Oakley died in Orlando, Florida, from prostate cancer at the age of 61. He was survived by his wife Doris and sons James and Christopher.

== Professional wins (4) ==
=== European Seniors Tour wins (4) ===
No.	Date	Tournament	Winning score	Margin of victory	Runner(s)-up
1	23 May 1999	MDIS & Partners Festival of Golf	−8 (68-71-69=208)	6 strokes	(United States) Jerry Bruner, (Scotland) David Huish
2	20 Aug 2000	De Vere Hotels Seniors Classic	−17 (67-64-65=196)	4 strokes	(Australia) Noel Ratcliffe
3	19 Aug 2001	Energis Senior Masters	−8 (68-69-71=208)	3 strokes	(England) Malcolm Gregson
4	2 Sep 2001	Scottish Seniors Open	−6 (65-70-75=210)	Playoff	(England) Keith MacDonald

European Seniors Tour playoff record (1–0)

No.	Year	Tournament	Opponent	Result
1	2001	Scottish Seniors Open	(England) Keith MacDonald	Won with par on second extra hole

== See also ==
- Florida Gators
- List of University of Florida alumni
