= MDIS & Partners Festival of Golf =

Senior golf tournament in Berkshire, England

Tournament information
- Location: Ascot, Berkshire, England
- Established: 1999
- Course: Mill Ride Golf Club
- Par: 72
- Tour: European Seniors Tour
- Format: Stroke play
- Prize fund: €110,000
- Month played: May
- Final year: 1999

Tournament record score
- Aggregate: 208 David Oakley (1999)
- To par: −8 as above

Final champion
- (United States) David Oakley
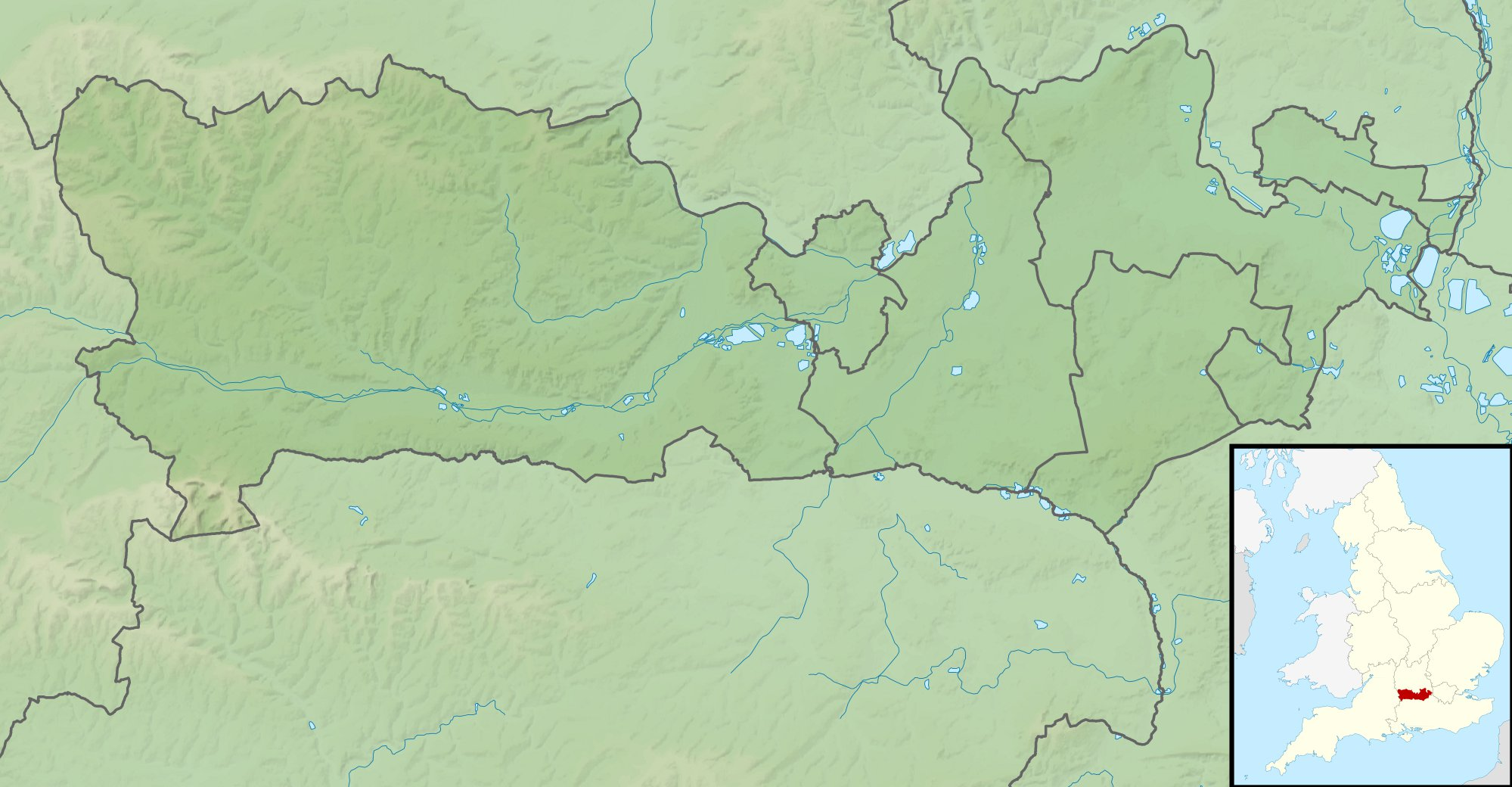
- Location in England Location in Berkshire

The MDIS & Partners Festival of Golf was a men's senior (over 50) professional golf tournament on the European Seniors Tour, held at the Donald Steel designed Mill Ride Golf Club, near Ascot, Berkshire, England. It was held just once, in May 1999, and was won by David Oakley who finished six shots ahead of Jerry Bruner and David Huish. The total prize fund was €110,000 with the winner receiving €15,950.

== Winners ==
Year	Winner	Score	To par	Margin of victory	Runners-up
1999	(United States) David Oakley	208	−8	6 strokes	(United States) Jerry Bruner (Scotland) David Huish
