= Glenn Ralph =

English golfer (born 1956)

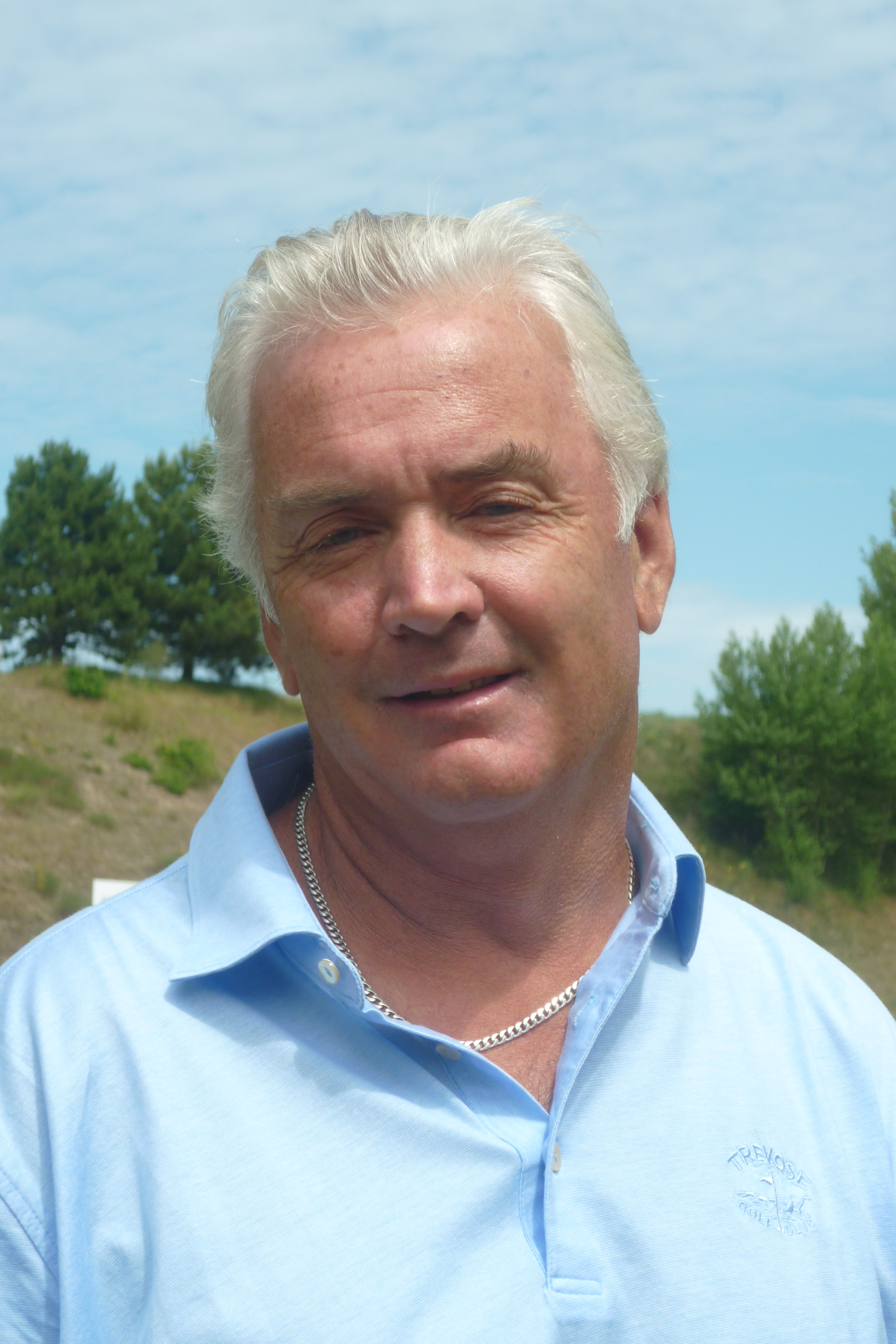

Personal information
- Full name: Glenn William Ralph
- Nationality: England
- Born: 12 July 1956 (age 70) Haslemere, Surrey
- Height: 6 ft 2 in (1.88 m)

Career
- Sport: Golf
- Turned professional: 1973
- Current tour: European Senior Tour
- Former tour: European Tour
- Professional wins: 1

Number of wins by tour
- European Senior Tour: 1

Best results in major championships
- Masters Tournament: DNP
- PGA Championship: DNP
- U.S. Open: DNP
- The Open Championship: CUT (3rd round): 1980

Glenn William Ralph (born 12 July 1956) is an English professional golfer.

== Career ==
Ralph was born in Haslemere, Surrey. He turned professional in 1973, and played on the European Tour for many years. His best season came in 1987 when he finished in 51st place on the Order of Merit.

Since turning 50, Ralph has competed on the European Senior Tour, where he has enjoyed some success. Having finished 36th on the money list in 2006, and 23rd in 2007, he missed virtually the entire 2008 season having broken his ankle. He won his first title in 2009 at the Cleveland Golf/Srixon Scottish Senior Open.

== Professional wins (1) ==
=== European Senior Tour wins (1) ===
No.	Date	Tournament	Winning score	Margin of victory	Runners-up
1	23 Aug 2009	Cleveland Golf/Srixon Scottish Senior Open	−8 (71-67-70=208)	1 stroke	(England) Bob Cameron, (Argentina) Luis Carbonetti

European Senior Tour playoff record (0–1)

No.	Year	Tournament	Opponent	Result
1	2007	Scandinavian Senior Open	(Scotland) John Chillas	Lost to par on fourth extra hole

== Results in major championships ==
Tournament	1980	1981	1982	1983	1984	1985	1986
The Open Championship	CUT			CUT		CUT	CUT

Note: Ralph only played in The Open Championship.

Did not play

CUT = missed the half-way cut (3rd round cut in 1980 Open Championship)
"T" = tied

== Team appearances ==
- Europcar Cup (representing England): 1988
