= Miramar Open =

The Miramar Open was a golf tournament on the Tour Argentino de Profesionales, formerly the principal professional golf tour in Argentina. The tournament has been played only three times, the first in 1983; it has always been held at the Links Miramar Golf Club in Miramar, Buenos Aires Province. It was last held in 2004.

== Winners ==
Year	Winner	Runner-up
2004	Juan Pablo Abbate	36 holes
2001–03	No tournament	
2000	Martin Lonardi	Florentino Molina
1984–99	No tournament	
1983	Luis Carbonetti (amateur)	Antonio Ortiz, Dionisio Rios
