= Renato Campagnoli =

Italian professional golfer

Personal information
- Nationality: Italy
- Born: 19 November 1943 (age 82)
- Height: 1.70 m (5 ft 7 in)
- Weight: 65 kg (143 lb; 10.2 st)

Career
- Sport: Golf
- Turned professional: 1962
- Former tour: European Senior Tour
- Professional wins: 5

Number of wins by tour
- European Senior Tour: 2
- Other: 3

Renato Campagnoli (born 19 November 1943) is an Italian professional golfer. He represented Italy three times in the World Cup.

Campagnoli had a successful career on the European Seniors Tour, winning twice; in the 1995 International German PGA Seniors Championship and the 1996 De Vere Hotels Seniors Classic. He was also runner-up in the 1994 Belfast Telegraph Irish Senior Masters (in a playoff), the 1994 Shell Scottish Seniors Open, the 1997 Lawrence Batley Seniors, the 1998 Ryder Seniors Classic and The Belfry PGA Seniors Championship in 1998.

== Professional wins (5) ==
- 1978 Italian National Open
- 1980 Italian National Open
- 1986 Italian PGA Championship

=== European Seniors Tour wins (2) ===
| No. | Date | Tournament | Winning score | Margin of victory | Runners-up |
|---|---|---|---|---|---|
| 1 | 16 Jul 1995 | International German PGA Seniors Championship | −8 (68-69-71=208) | 2 strokes | (Italy) Alberto Croce, (Wales) Brian Huggett |
| 2 | 2 Jun 1996 | De Vere Hotels Seniors Classic | −9 (70-69-68=207) | 5 strokes | (Spain) Antonio Garrido, (England) Tommy Horton |

European Seniors Tour playoff record (0–1)

| No. | Year | Tournament | Opponent | Result |
|---|---|---|---|---|
| 1 | 1994 | Belfast Telegraph Irish Senior Masters | (England) Tommy Horton | Lost to par on second extra hole |

== Team appearances ==
- World Cup (representing Italy): 1974, 1978, 1980
- Hennessy Cognac Cup (representing Italy): 1984
