= Takao Nogami =

Japanese professional golfer

Personal information
- Nationality: Japan
- Born: 10 July 1971 (age 55) Fukuoka Prefecture, Japan
- Height: 1.76 m (5 ft 9 in)
- Weight: 85 kg (187 lb; 13.4 st)

Career
- Sport: Golf
- Status: Professional
- Current tour: Japan Golf Tour
- Professional wins: 3

Number of wins by tour
- Japan Golf Tour: 1
- Other: 2

Takao Nogami (born 10 July 1971) is a Japanese professional golfer.

== Career ==
Nogami plays on the Japan Golf Tour, where he has won once.

== Professional wins (3) ==
=== Japan Golf Tour wins (1) ===
No.	Date	Tournament	Winning score	Margin of victory	Runner-up
1	10 Jul 2005	Woodone Open Hiroshima	−14 (68-67-67-68=270)	1 stroke	(Fiji) Dinesh Chand

=== Asia Golf Circuit wins (1) ===
No.	Date	Tournament	Winning score	Margin of victory	Runners-up
1	16 Feb 1997	Mitsubishi Motors Southwoods Open	−7 (66-72-73-70=281)	2 strokes	(Canada) Jim Rutledge, (United States) Kevin Wentworth

=== Other wins (1) ===
- 2000 Kyusyu Open
