= Sanremo Masters =

Tournament information
- Location: Bogogno, Italy
- Established: 2004
- Course: Sanremo Golf Club
- Par: 67
- Length: 5,114 yards (4,676 m)
- Tour: European Senior Tour
- Format: Stroke play
- Prize fund: €200,000
- Month played: October
- Final year: 2004

Tournament record score
- Aggregate: 193 Bob Cameron (2004)
- To par: −8 as above

Final champion
- (England) Bob Cameron
- Location in Italy Location in Piedmont

The Sanremo Masters was a men's senior (over 50) professional golf tournament on the European Seniors Tour, held at Circolo Golf degli Ulivi, Sanremo, Liguria, Italy. It was held just once, in October 2004, and was won by Bob Cameron who finished two strokes ahead of Giuseppe Calì. The total prize fund was €200,000 with the winner receiving €33,333.

== Winners ==
Year	Winner	Score	To par	Margin of victory	Runner-up
2004	(England) Bob Cameron	193	−8	2 strokes	(Italy) Giuseppe Calì
