= St Mellion International Resort =

Hotel near Saltash, Cornwall

St Mellion International Resort, Cornwall
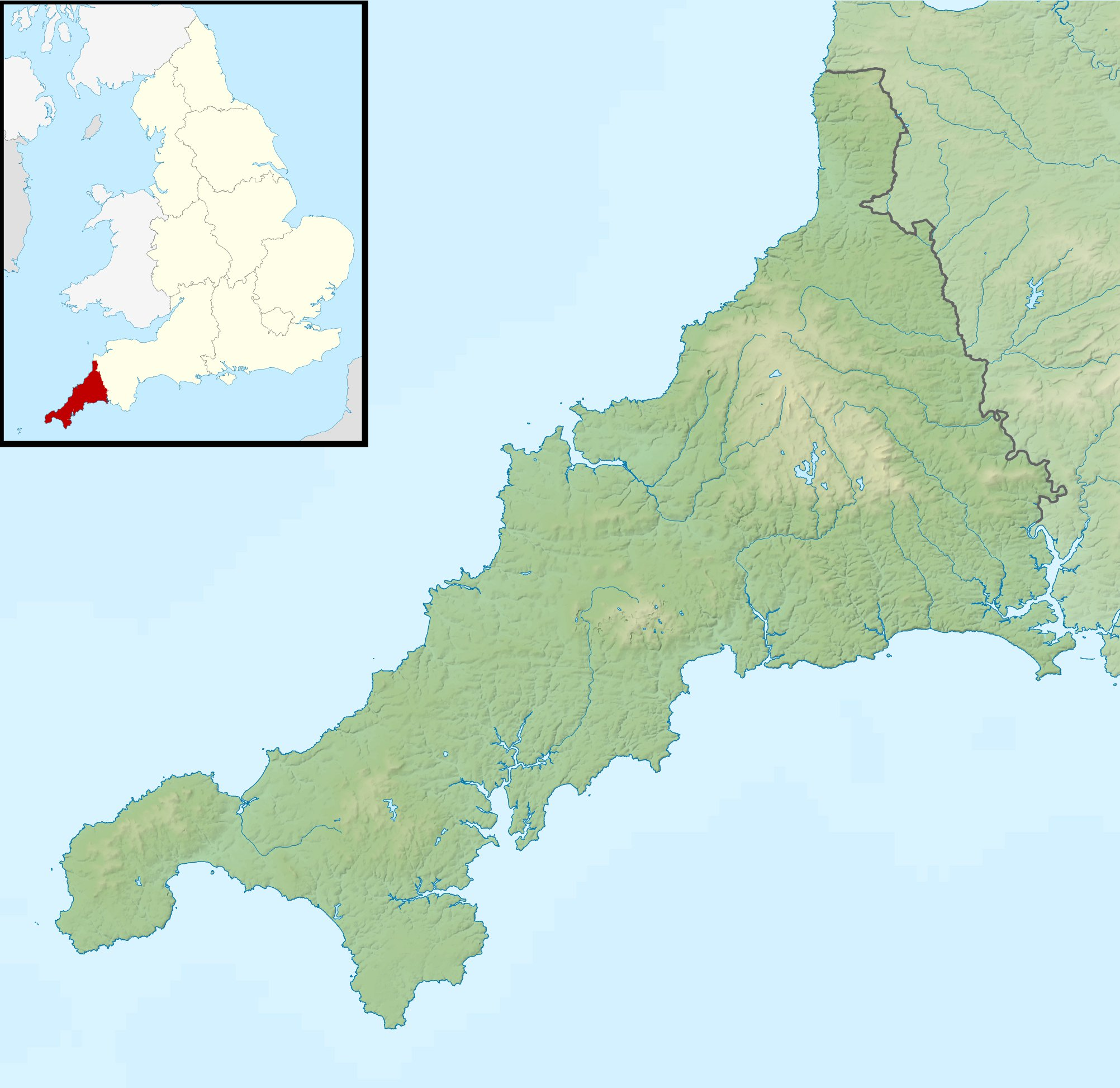
- Location within Cornwall
- 50.467573°N 4.272092°W

Club information
- Location: St Mellion, Cornwall, England, United Kingdom
- Established: 1976
- Type: Private
- Owner: Crown Golf
- Tota holes: 36
- Tournaments: B&H Intnl Open
- Website: www.st-mellion.co.uk

Nicklaus Course
- Designed by: Jack Nicklaus
- Par: 72
- Length: 7,054

Kernow Course
- Designed by: Alan Leather
- Par: 70
- Length: 5,606

St Mellion: Cornish: Sen Melyan
- Ceremonial county: Cornwall
- Post town: SALTASH
- Postcode district: PL12
- Dialling code: 01579
- Police
- Fire
- Ambulance
- UK Parliament: South East Cornwall

The St Mellion Estate, formerly St Mellion International Resort, is a hotel with golf and other recreational facilities in the parish of St Mellion, near Saltash, in east Cornwall.

St Mellion, which comprises a hotel, conference facilities, health club, spa and two championship golf courses, is owned and operated by Crown Golf, and was purchased via American Golf (UK) from American Golf Corporation. American Golf previously took ownership of the resort in 1998.

== Golf courses and history ==
=== Old Course ===
The Old Course, the St Mellion estate's first course, was laid out on the potato farm of Hermon and Martin Bond and opened in 1976. Beginning in 2008, the golf course was significantly altered as part of a £20-million redevelopment of the complex. The changes included the construction of 9 new golf holes which were redesignated as part of the Kernow Course from May 2010.

=== Jack Nicklaus Signature Course ===
The course designed by Jack Nicklaus was officially opened in 1988 with the hosting of a USA vs GB match featuring Jack Nicklaus (himself) and Tom Watson representing the USA against Sandy Lyle and Nick Faldo representing Great Britain. The Nicklaus course hosted the Benson & Hedges International Open on 7 occasions between 1979 and 1995, and has twice hosted The English Seniors Open.

St Mellion's Nicklaus Course is a contender for future PGA European Tour events, following its £100 million redevelopment completed in 2010. However, St Mellion's initially proposed hosting of the English Open tournament was postponed after the developers ran into financial difficulties following the Great Recession.

==== Scorecard ====
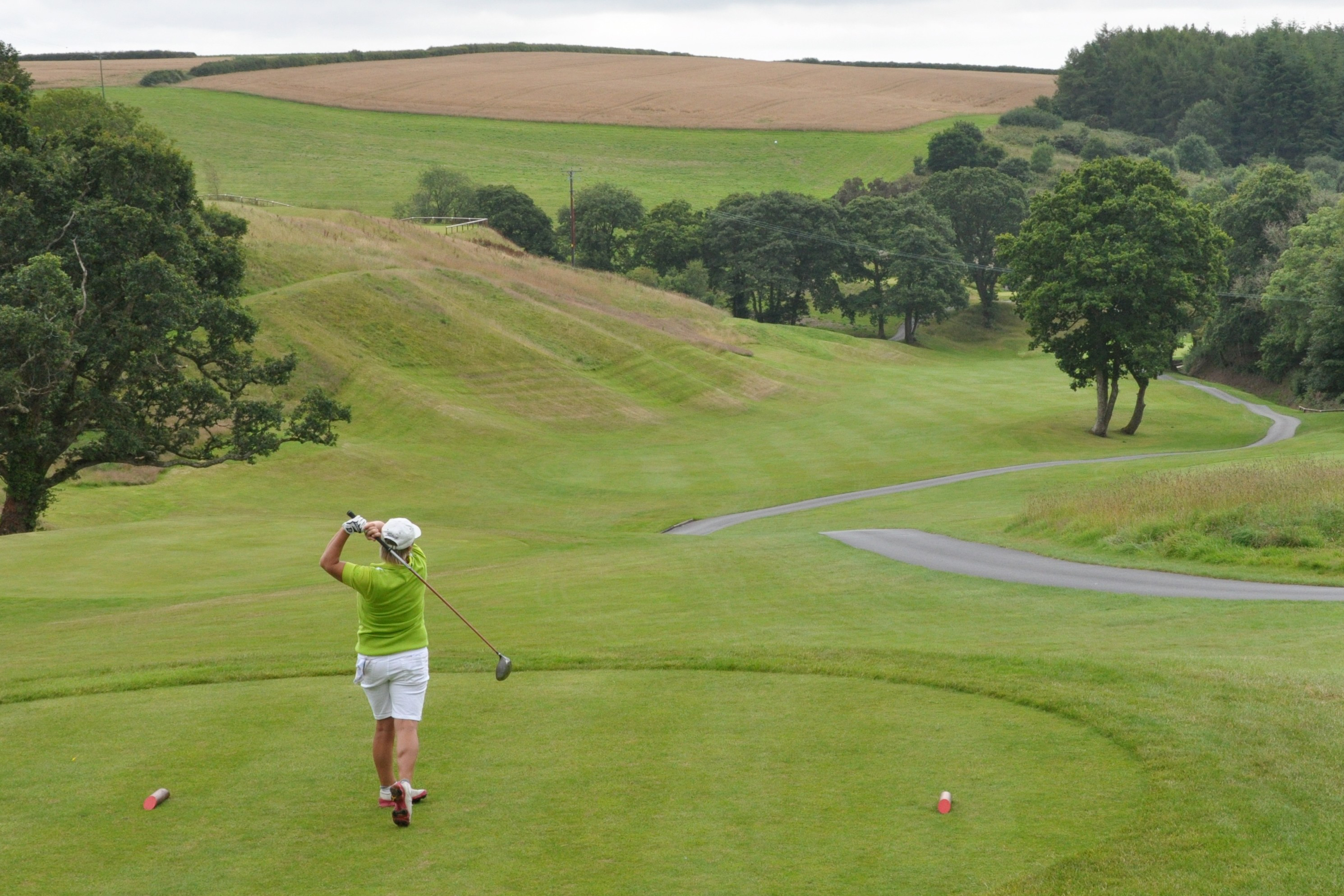
St Mellion Golf Club viewed from the 10th tee in 2011

The scorecard for the Nicklaus Course from the championship yardage is given below:

Hole	Yardage	Par	---	Hole	Yardage	Par
1	416	4	---	10	442	4
2	545	5	---	11	202	3
3	361	4	---	12	564	5
4	180	3	---	13	399	4
5	344	4	---	14	191	3
6	435	4	---	15	428	4
7	501	5	---	16	544	5
8	132	3	---	17	451	4
9	405	4	---	18	470	5
Out	3319	36		In	3691	36
				Total	7010	72

=== Kernow Course ===
The Kernow Course, St Mellion's newer course, opened in 2010 and takes its name from the Cornish for Cornwall. It was designed by Alan Leather and incorporates parts of the Old Course.

== Competitions hosted ==
=== European Tour ===
==== Benson & Hedges International Open ====
St Mellion has hosted the Benson & Hedges International Open on the European Tour on 7 occasions.

Year	Winner	Country	Score	Margin of victory	Runner(s)-up	Country	Ref
1995	Peter O'Malley	Australia	280 (−8)	1 stroke	Mark James	England	
1995	Peter O'Malley	Australia	280 (−8)	1 stroke	Costantino Rocca	Italy	
1994	Seve Ballesteros	Spain	281 (−7)	3 strokes	Nick Faldo	England	
1993	Paul Broadhurst	England	276 (−12)	1 stroke	Mark James	England	
1993	Paul Broadhurst	England	276 (−12)	1 stroke	José María Olazábal	Spain	
1992	Peter Senior	Australia	287 (−1)	Playoff	Tony Johnstone	Zimbabwe	
1991	Bernhard Langer	Germany	286 (−2)	2 strokes	Vijay Singh	Fiji	
1990	José María Olazábal	Spain	279 (−9)	1 stroke	Ian Woosnam	Wales	
1979	Maurice Bembridge	England	272 (−8)	2 strokes	Ken Brown	Scotland	

==== St. Mellion Timeshare TPC ====
St Mellion also hosted the Tournament Players Championship (United Kingdom) (St. Mellion Timeshare TPC) on the European Tour in 1983 and 1984.

Year	Winner	Country	Score	Margin of victory	Runner(s)-up	Country	Ref
1984	Jaime Gonzalez	Brazil	265 (−15)	Playoff	Mark James	England	
1983	Bernhard Langer	Germany	269 (−11)	2 strokes	Paul Way	England	

=== European Senior Tour ===
St Mellion has twice hosted the English Seniors Open on the European Senior Tour.

Year	Winner	Country	Score	Margin of victory	Runner(s)-up	Country	Ref
2007	Bill Longmuir	Scotland	208 (−8)	2 strokes	Carl Mason	England	
2006	Carl Mason	England	212 (−4)	1 stroke	Stewart Ginn	Australia	

=== Amateur competitions ===
==== English Amateur ====
St Mellion hosted the English Amateur in 1999.

Year	Winner	Country	Margin of victory	Runner(s)-up	Country	Ref
1999	Paul Casey	England	2&1	Simon Dyson	England	
