= Shawnee Open =

Golf tournament formerly on the PGA Tour

The Shawnee Open was a golf tournament that was first held in 1912. It was played at The Shawnee Inn & Golf Resort in Smithfield Township, Monroe County, Pennsylvania. The course was completed in 1911, the first design by renowned architect A. W. Tillinghast. The Shawnee Open was recognized as a PGA Tour event from 1916 to 1937. While no longer recognized as a PGA Tour event, there have been more than 60 Shawnee Opens played. It was sponsored by the Philadelphia section of the PGA of America.

In 1938, Shawnee hosted the PGA Championship and the Shawnee touring professional, Sam Snead, lost to Paul Runyan 8 and 7. According to legend, Tommy Armour hit 10 straight balls out of bounds and scored the first ever "Archaeopteryx" (15 or more over-par) when he made a 23 on a par-5, for 18-over-par at the 1927 Shawnee Open. Many sources still claim that this represents the highest score on one hole in PGA history. However, other research shows that he carded "only" an 11 on the 17th hole in the third round.

== Winners ==
Philadelphia Section of PGA of America event

- 2019 Brian Bergstol
- 2018 Brian Bergstol
- 2017 Brett Melton
- 2016 Michael Little
- 2015 Josh Rackley
- 2014 Mark Sheftic
- 2013 John Pillar
- 2012 Greg Farrow
- 2011 No tournament (weather)
- 2010 Don Allan
- 2009 Travis Deibert
- 2008 John Pillar
- 2007 Stu Ingraham
- 2006 No tournament (bridge washed out)
- 2005 Barry Dear
- 2004 Dave McNabb
- 2003 Mark Parisi
- 2002 Rich Steinmetz
- 2001 Greg Farrow
- 2000 Chris Anderson
- 1999 Pete Oakley
- 1998 Pete Oakley
- 1990–97 No tournament
- 1989 Wayne Phillips
- 1988 Harold Perry
- 1987 Gene Fieger
- 1986 Pete Oakley
- 1985 Wayne Phillips
- 1984 Pete Oakley
- 1983 Pete Oakley
- 1982 Dennis Milne
- 1981 John Kulhamer
- 1980 Pete Oakley
- 1979 Jack Connelly
- 1965–78 No tournament
- 1964 William Petersen
- 1963 No tournament
- 1962 Howard Everitt
- 1961 Raymond Lebel
- 1960 Raymond Lebel
- 1959 Leon Buck
- 1958 W.C. Wehnes
- 1957 F.A. Winchenbach
- 1956 Howard Everitt
- 1955 Howard Everitt
- 1954 Howard Everitt
- 1953 Ellis Taylor
- 1952 Olin Cerrochi
- 1951 Tom Robins
- 1950 Ed Meister
- 1949 Ed Meister
- 1939–48 No tournament
- 1938 Robert Weichel

PGA Tour

- 1937 Lawson Little
- 1936 Ed Dudley
- 1931–35 No tournament
- 1930 Ed Dudley
- 1929 Harry Cooper
- 1928 Willie Macfarlane
- 1927 Johnny Farrell
- 1926 Johnny Farrell
- 1925 Willie Macfarlane
- 1924 Leo Diegel
- 1923 George McLean
- 1922 Johnny Farrell
- 1921 Willie Ogg
- 1920 Jim Barnes
- 1919 Jim Barnes
- 1918 No tournament
- 1917 Eddie Loos
- 1916 Walter Hagen

pre-PGA Tour

- 1915 Gilbert Nicholls
- 1914 Isaac Mackie
- 1913 John McDermott
- 1912 Fred McLeod
