= Kungsängen Golf Club =

Golf club in Stockholm County, Sweden

Coordinates: 59.516°N 17.723°E

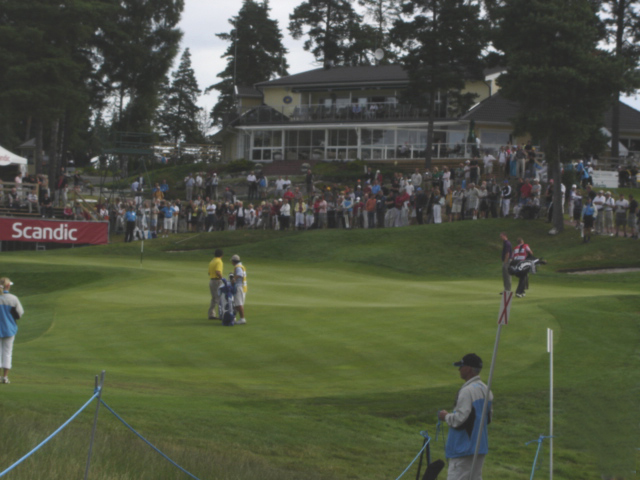
- 9th Hole
- Interactive map of Kungsängen Golf Club

Club information
- Location: Kungsängen, Stockholm County, Sweden
- Established: 1989
- Total holes: 18 + 18
- Tournaments: Scandinavian Masters; STC Scandinavian International
- Website: http://kungsangengc.se/

Kungsängen Golf Club is a golf club in Kungsängen, Sweden.

The club was established in 1989. In that year, the first 18 holes were constructed. The club now has two 18-hole golf courses: the 'Kings Course' and the 'Queens Course'. The club house was completed in 1993.

== Queens Course ==
The Queens Course is the oldest of the two golf courses and opened in 1991. The course runs through the forests, is smaller and has smaller greens.

== Kings Course ==
The Kings Course opened in 1993 and immediately had 18 holes. Three years later, there were increased ambitions and the course would be renovated to be made suitable for international championships. The course was made wider so that there would be room for the public. There are natural water hazards and the fairways are surrounded by pines.

=== European Tour ===
The club hosted the Scandinavian Masters, one of the tournaments of the European Tour in 1998, 2000, 2002 and 2005. The first tournament that this course hosted was won by a Jesper Parnevik, a local professional.

- 1998 (Sweden) Jesper Parnevik
- 2000 (England) Lee Westwood
- 2002 (Northern Ireland) Graeme McDowell
- 2005 (Australia) Mark Hensby

Kungsängen is 25 minutes away from Stockholm and belongs to the PGA European Tour Courses.

=== European Senior Tour ===
In 2001, the club hosted the STC Scandinavian International, one of the tournaments in the European Senior Tour. It was a 54-hole tournament.

- 2001 (Republic of Ireland) Denis O'Sullivan with a score of −8
