= Kinpachi Yoshimura =

Japanese golfer (born 1952)

Personal information
- Nationality: Japan
- Born: 20 March 1952 (age 74) Kōchi Prefecture, Japan
- Height: 1.72 m (5 ft 8 in)
- Weight: 67 kg (148 lb; 10.6 st)

Career
- Sport: Golf
- Status: Professional
- Former tour: Japan Golf Tour
- Professional wins: 5

Number of wins by tour
- Japan Golf Tour: 4
- Other: 1

Kinpachi Yoshimura (born 20 March 1952) is a Japanese professional golfer.

== Professional career ==
Yoshimura played on the Japan Golf Tour, winning four times.

== Professional wins (5) ==
=== PGA of Japan Tour wins (4) ===
No.	Date	Tournament	Winning score	Margin of victory	Runner(s)-up
1	8 Sep 1985	Kyusyu Open	−5 (73-71-69-70=283)	1 stroke	(Japan) Norikazu Kawakami
2	7 Sep 1986	Kyusyu Open (2)	−7 (68-73-70-70=281)	4 strokes	(Japan) Norikazu Kawakami, (Japan) Katsuyoshi Tomori
3	12 Apr 1987	Pocari Sweat Open	−10 (68-68-68-70=274)	Playoff	(Japan) Yoshiyuki Isomura
4	8 Sep 1991	Kyusyu Open (3)	+2 (76-69-73-72=290)	2 strokes	(Japan) Isamu Sugita

PGA of Japan Tour playoff record (1–1)

No.	Year	Tournament	Opponent	Result
1	1985	Sapporo Tokyu Open	(Japan) Teruo Sugihara	Lost to par on first extra hole
2	1987	Pocari Sweat Open	(Japan) Yoshiyuki Isomura	Won with par on first extra hole

=== Other wins (1) ===
- 1995 Kyushu Open
