= 1977–78 New Zealand Golf Circuit =

Golf tour season

1977–78 New Zealand Golf Circuit season
- Duration: 20 October 1977 – 3 January 1978
- Number of official events: 4
- Money list: (Australia) David Good

The 1977–78 New Zealand Golf Circuit was the 15th season of the New Zealand Golf Circuit, the main professional golf tour in New Zealand since it was established in 1963.

== Schedule ==
The following table lists official events during the 1977–78 season.

Date	Tournament	Location	Purse (NZ$)	Winner (Note: The number in brackets after each winner's name is the number of New Zealand Golf Circuit events they had won up to and including that tournament. This information is only shown for New Zealand Golf Circuit members.)	Notes
23 Oct	Air New Zealand Shell Open	Auckland	75,000	(Australia) David Good (1)	
4 Dec	Otago Charity Classic	Otago	40,000	(Spain) Seve Ballesteros (n/a)	
11 Dec	New Zealand Open	Auckland	50,000	(United States) Bob Byman (n/a)	
3 Jan	New Zealand PGA Championship	Bay of Plenty	30,000	(New Zealand) Simon Owen (2)	

== Money list ==
The money list was based on tournament results during the season, calculated in New Zealand dollars.

Position	Player	Prize money (NZ$)
1	(Australia) David Good	18,853
2	(United States) Bob Byman	15,908
3	(Australia) Bill Dunk	9,000
4	(New Zealand) Simon Owen	8,583
5	(Australia) Terry Gale	7,985
