= Tunisian Seniors Open =

Tournament information
- Location: Port El Kantaoui, Tunisia
- Established: 1992
- Course: El Kantaoui Golf Club
- Par: 72
- Length: 6,384 yards (5,838 m)
- Tour: European Seniors Tour
- Format: Stroke play
- Prize fund: £125,000
- Month played: October
- Final year: 2003

Tournament record score
- Aggregate: 198 David Good (2003)
- To par: −18 as above

Final champion
- (Australia) David Good
- Location in Tunisia

The Tunisian Seniors Open was a senior (over 50s) men's professional match play golf tournament played on the European Seniors Tour. It was played in late 1992 and then from 2001 to 2003. It was held at Port El Kantaoui Golf Club, Port El Kantaoui, Tunisia which had previously hosted the Tunisian Open from 1982 to 1985.

== Winners ==
Year	Winner	Score	To par	Margin of victory	Runner(s)-up	Ref.
Tunisian Seniors Open
2003	(Australia) David Good	198	−18	5 strokes	(Chile) Guillermo Encina	
2002	(Republic of Ireland) Denis O'Sullivan	202	−14	2 strokes	(England) John Morgan	
2001	(New Zealand) Simon Owen	208	−8	Playoff	(United States) Bob Lendzion	
1993–2000: No tournament
Tunisian Seniors
1992	(Scotland) John Hamilton	216	E	2 strokes	(England) Bryan Carter	
