= Scandinavian Seniors Open =

Tournament information
- Location: Copenhagen, Denmark
- Established: 2005
- Course: Royal Copenhagen Golf Club
- Par: 71
- Length: 6,429 yards (5,879 m)
- Tour: European Seniors Tour
- Format: Stroke play
- Prize fund: €250,000
- Month played: September
- Final year: 2007

Tournament record score
- Aggregate: 196 Bill Longmuir (2005)
- To par: −14 Bill Longmuir (2005) −14 Katsuyoshi Tomori (2006)

Final champion
- (Scotland) John Chillas
- Location in Denmark

The Scandinavian Senior Open was a men's professional golf tournament for players aged 50 and above as part of the European Seniors Tour. It was played in Denmark from 2005 to 2007. The 2005 and 2006 events were held at Royal Copenhagen Golf Club, Kongens Lyngby, while the 2006 tournament was played at Helsingør Golf Club, Helsingør. The prize fund was €250,000.

== Winners ==
Year	Winner	Score	To par	Margin of victory	Runner(s)-up	Venue
2007	(Scotland) John Chillas	205	−8	Playoff	(England) Glenn Ralph	Royal Copenhagen
2006	(Japan) Katsuyoshi Tomori	199	−14	2 strokes	(Republic of Ireland) Eamonn Darcy (Spain) José Rivero	Helsingør
2005	(Scotland) Bill Longmuir	196	−14	4 strokes	(Italy) Giuseppe Calì	Royal Copenhagen
