= Luis Carbonetti =

Argentine golfer

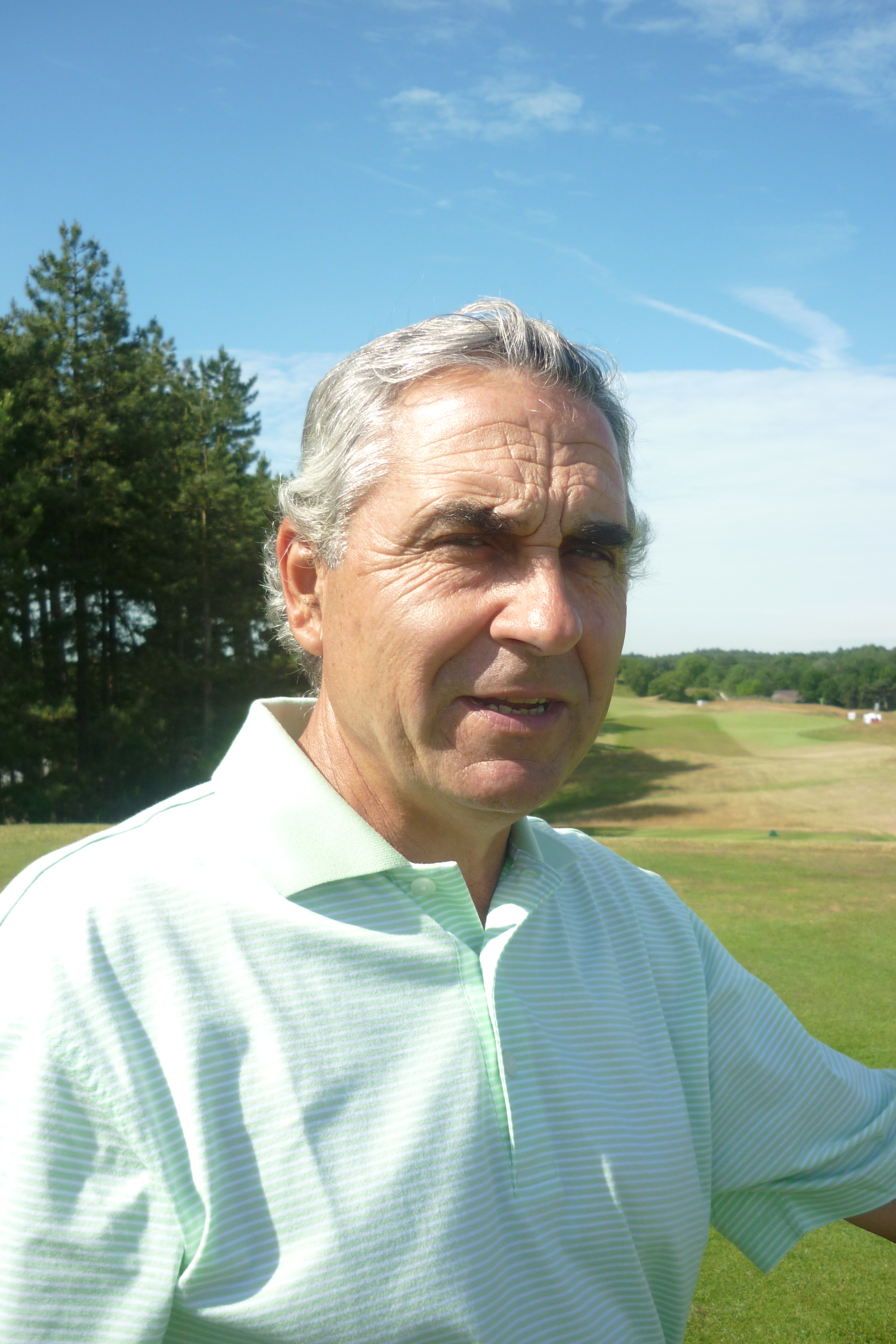

Personal information
- Full name: Luis Guillermo Carbonetti
- Nationality: Argentina
- Born: 23 April 1953 (age 73) Río Cuarto, Córdoba
- Height: 1.75 m (5 ft 9 in)

Career
- Sport: Golf
- Turned professional: 1984
- Current tour: European Seniors Tour
- Former tours: European Tour; Champions Tour
- Professional wins: 28

Number of wins by tour
- European Senior Tour: 3
- Other: 22 (regular); 3 (senior)

Luis Guillermo Carbonetti (born 23 April 1953) is an Argentine professional golfer.

== Early life and amateur career ==
Carbonetti was born in Río Cuarto, Córdoba. He is the brother of golfer Horacio Carbonetti.

As an amateur, he played on five Eisenhower Trophy teams and won the individual title twice (1982 and 1984).

== Professional career ==
In 1984, Carbonetti turned pro. He won the Argentine Tour Order of Merit in 1985 and Cordoba Tour Order of Merit 2002. He also played on the European Tour in the 1980s and 1990s. His best finishes on tour were a pair of T-7 in 1989 at the Lancia Italian Open and Torras Monte Carlo Open.

Carbonetti played on the U.S.-based Champions Tour in 2003 and is now a member of the European Seniors Tour and has three victories on this tour.

== Amateur wins ==
- 1972 Jockey Club Rosario Open
- 1975 Amateur Argentine Open
- 1976 Center Open, Viña del Mar Open (Chile)
- 1977 Rio Cuarto Open, Parana Open, Golden Cup Jujuy, Argentine Masters, Gordon Kenneth Cup
- 1978 Porto Alegre Open (Brazil), Uruguay Open, Center Open, El Rincon Grand Prix (Colombia), North Open
- 1979 San Isidro Grand Prix, Los Lagartos Grand Prix, Livramento Grand Prix (Brazil)
- 1980 Abierto del Litoral, Center Open, Uruguay Open, Jockey Club Rosario Open
- 1981 Center Open, Amateur Dutch Open
- 1982 Acantilados Grand Prix, Center Open, Golden Cup Jujuy, Las Americas Tournament (USA), Rio Cuarto Open, Eisenhower Trophy (individual), Bucaramanga Open (Colombia)
- 1983 San Andres Grand Prix, Rio Cuarto Open, Center Open, Bucaramanga Open (Colombia), Amateur Argentine Open, Amateur Colombian Open, Jockey Club Rosario Open
- 1984 Acantilados Grand Prix, South Open, North Open, Eisenhower Trophy (individual), Argentine National Championship, Ford Taunus Grand Prix, Ituzaingo Grand Prix

== Professional wins (28) ==
=== Argentine wins (15) ===
- 1982 Golden Cup Jujuy (as amateur)
- 1983 Center Open (as amateur), Miramar Grand Prix (as amateur)
- 1985 Punta del Este Open (Uruguay), Center Open, Rio Cuarto Open, North Open
- 1986 Center Open
- 1989 Punta del Este Open (Uruguay), Praderas Grand Prix
- 1992 Smithfield Country Club Grand Prix, Nautico Escobar Club Grand Prix
- 1993 Abierto del Litoral, Pacheco Club Grand Prix
- 2000 North Open

=== Cordoba Tour wins (2) ===
- 2002 Jockey Club Cordoba Tournament, Ascochigas Club Tournament

=== Other wins (5) ===
- 1978 San Pablo Open (Brazil) (as amateur)
- 1987 Ciudad del Este Open (Paraguay), 1987 Swesish Challenge
- 1990 Santo Domingo Open (Chile)
- 1996 Callaway Cup (Argentine), Brahma Challenge (Argentine)

=== European Seniors Tour wins (3) ===
No.	Date	Tournament	Winning score	Margin of victory	Runner(s)-up
1	23 May 2004	Digicel Jamaica Classic	−8 (63-75-70=208)	Playoff	(Australia) Terry Gale
2	5 Sep 2004	Bovis Lend Lease European Senior Masters	−7 (73-65-71=209)	2 strokes	(Scotland) John Chillas
3	13 Mar 2005	Tobago Plantations Seniors Classic	−8 (69-71-68=208)	2 strokes	(Argentina) Horacio Carbonetti, (Scotland) Bill Longmuir

European Seniors Tour playoff record (1–0)

No.	Year	Tournament	Opponent	Result
1	2004	Digicel Jamaica Classic	(Australia) Terry Gale	Won with birdie on first extra hole

=== Other senior wins (3) ===
- 2004 Acantilados Senior Grand Prix, Punta del Este Senior Open (Uruguay), Cadillac Senior Classic (USA)

== Team appearances ==
Amateur

- Eisenhower Trophy (representing Argentina): 1976, 1978, 1980, 1982 (individual leader), 1984 (individual leader, tie)
- South American Cup (Los Andes Cup): 1975, 1976 (winner), 1977 (winner), 1978 (winner), 1981 (winner), 1982, 1983, 1984 (winner)
- Vigil Cup (Argentine): 1975 (winner), 1976 (winner), 1977 (winner), 1979, 1980, 1984 (individual winner)

Professional

- World Cup (representing Argentina): 1990, 1993
