= 2004 European Seniors Tour =

Golf tour season

2004 European Seniors Tour season
- Duration: 19 March 2004 – 24 October 2004
- Number of official events: 23
- Most wins: (England) Carl Mason (5)
- Order of Merit: (England) Carl Mason
- Rookie of the Year: (United States) Pete Oakley

The 2004 European Seniors Tour was the 13th season of the European Seniors Tour, the main professional golf tour in Europe for men aged 50 and over.

== Schedule ==
The following table lists official events during the 2004 season.

Date	Tournament	Host country	Purse (€)	Winner (Note: The number in brackets after each winner's name is the number of European Seniors Tour events they had won up to and including that tournament. This information is only shown for European Seniors Tour members.)	Notes
21 Mar	Tobago Plantations Seniors Classic	Trinidad and Tobago	£125,000	(England) Carl Mason (5)	
28 Mar	DGM Barbados Open	Barbados	US$230,000	(South Africa) Gavan Levenson (1)	
9 May	Open de France Seniors	France	200,000	(England) Bob Cameron (1)	
16 May	Bosch Italian Seniors Open	Italy	160,000	(Australia) Terry Gale (6)	New tournament
23 May	Digicel Jamaica Classic	Jamaica	US$280,000	(Argentina) Luis Carbonetti (1)	
30 May	Senior PGA Championship	United States	US$2,000,000	(United States) Hale Irwin (n/a)	Senior major championship (Note: Official win; unofficial money.)
6 Jun	AIB Irish Seniors Open	Ireland	330,000	(England) Carl Mason (6)	
13 Jun	Irvine Whitlock Jersey Seniors Classic	Jersey	£120,000	(England) Jim Rhodes (2)	
20 Jun	Mobile Cup	England	£125,000	(Scotland) Bill Longmuir (3)	
27 Jun	De Vere Northumberland Seniors Classic	England	£150,000	(England) Malcolm Gregson (5)	
4 Jul	Ryder Cup Wales Seniors Open	Wales	£500,000	(United States) Ray Carrasco (3)	
11 Jul	Nigel Mansell Sunseeker International Classic	England	£150,000	(Japan) Seiji Ebihara (6)	
25 Jul	The Senior British Open Championship	Northern Ireland	US$1,600,000	(United States) Pete Oakley (1)	Senior major championship
31 Jul	Bad Ragaz PGA Seniors Open	Switzerland	190,000	(Argentina) Horacio Carbonetti (2)	
1 Aug	U.S. Senior Open	United States	US$2,600,000	(United States) Peter Jacobsen (n/a)	Senior major championship
8 Aug	De Vere PGA Seniors Championship	England	£200,000	(England) Carl Mason (7)	
15 Aug	Travis Perkins Senior Masters	England	£225,000	(Scotland) Sam Torrance (1)	
29 Aug	Charles Church Scottish Seniors Open	England	£150,000	(Scotland) Bill Longmuir (4)	
5 Sep	Bovis Lend Lease European Senior Masters	England	£225,000	(Argentina) Luis Carbonetti (2)	
11 Sep	The Daily Telegraph Turismo Andaluz; European Seniors Match Play Championship	England	£100,000	(England) Carl Mason (8)	
26 Sep	ADT English Seniors Open	England	£150,000	(England) Carl Mason (9)	
3 Oct	Sanremo Masters	Italy	200,000	(England) Bob Cameron (2)	New tournament
24 Oct	Estoril Seniors Tour Championship	Portugal	240,000	(Scotland) John Chillas (2)	Tour Championship

=== Unofficial events ===
The following events were sanctioned by the European Seniors Tour, but did not carry official money, nor were wins official.

Date	Tournament	Host country	Purse (€)	Winners	Notes
21 Nov	UBS Cup	United States	US$3,000,000	Team USA	Team event

== Order of Merit ==
The Order of Merit was based on prize money won during the season, calculated in Euros.

Position	Player	Prize money (€)
1	(England) Carl Mason	354,775
2	(United States) Pete Oakley	286,386
3	(Scotland) John Chillas	218,281
4	(Japan) Seiji Ebihara	202,746
5	(Scotland) Bill Longmuir	201,470

== Awards ==
Award	Winner	Ref.
Rookie of the Year	(United States) Pete Oakley	
