= STC Scandinavian International =

Golf tournament

Tournament information
- Location: Stockholm, Sweden
- Established: 2001
- Course: Kungsängen Golf Club
- Par: 71
- Length: 6,324 yards (5,783 m)
- Tour: European Seniors Tour
- Format: Stroke play
- Prize fund: £225,000
- Month played: June
- Final year: 2001

Tournament record score
- Aggregate: 205 Denis O'Sullivan (2001)
- To par: −8 as above

Final champion
- (Republic of Ireland) Denis O'Sullivan
- Location in Sweden

The STC Scandinavian International was a men's senior (over 50) professional golf tournament on the European Seniors Tour, held at the Kungsängen Golf Club in Kungsängen, 40 km north-west of Stockholm, Sweden. It was held just once, in July 2001, and was won by Denis O'Sullivan who finished a shot ahead of Maurice Bembridge. The total prize fund was £225,000 with the winner receiving £37,500.

== Winners ==
Year	Winner	Score	To par	Margin of victory	Runner-up
2001	(Republic of Ireland) Denis O'Sullivan	205	−8	1 stroke	(England) Maurice Bembridge
