= English Seniors Open =

English Senior Open
Tournament information
- Location: Darlington, England
- Established: 2003
- Course: Rockliffe Hall
- Par: 72
- Length: 6,987 yards (6,389 m)
- Tour: European Senior Tour
- Format: Stroke play
- Prize fund: £200,000
- Month played: August
- Final year: 2014

Tournament record score
- Aggregate: 199 Steen Tinning (2013)
- To par: −17 as above

Final champion
- (Argentina) César Monasterio
- Location in England Location in County Durham

The English Seniors Open was a European Senior Tour men's professional golf tournament. It was first played in 2003 and each of the first three stagings were won by Carl Mason. In 2007 the prize fund was £150,000 and the host course was St Mellion in Cornwall. After a five-year break, the tournament returned in 2013 and 2014 at Rockliffe Hall in County Durham, with a £200,000 purse and a £30,000 first prize.

== Winners ==
Year	Winner	Score	To par	Margin of victory	Runner(s)-up	Venue
English Senior Open
2014	(Argentina) César Monasterio	202	−14	5 strokes	(England) Barry Lane (Scotland) Andrew Oldcorn	Rockliffe Hall
2013	(Denmark) Steen Tinning	199	−17	1 stroke	(Spain) Santiago Luna	Rockliffe Hall
2008–2012: No tournament
Midas English Seniors Open
2007	(Scotland) Bill Longmuir	208	−8	2 strokes	(England) Carl Mason	St Mellion
Midas Group English Seniors Open
2006	(England) Carl Mason (3)	212	−4	1 stroke	(Australia) Stewart Ginn	St Mellion
2005: No tournament
ADT English Seniors Open
2004	(England) Carl Mason (2)	213	−3	3 strokes	(England) Bob Cameron (Scotland) John Chillas	Formby Hall
Merseyside English Seniors Open
2003	(England) Carl Mason	208	−8	1 stroke	(Scotland) Bill Longmuir (Republic of Ireland) Denis O'Sullivan	Hillside
