= Legends in Golf =

Tobago Plantations Seniors Classic
Tournament information
- Location: Les Bons Villers, Belgium
- Established: 1998
- Course: Golf de Pierpont
- Par: 72
- Length: 6,722 yards (6,147 m)
- Tour: European Seniors Tour
- Format: Stroke play
- Prize fund: €130,000
- Month played: May
- Final year: 2003

Tournament record score
- Aggregate: 203 Michael Slater (1999)
- To par: −13 as above

Final champion
- (United States) Hank Woodrome
- Location in Belgium

The Legends in Golf was a golf tournament on the European Seniors Tour from 1998 to 2003. It was played on five different courses in two countries, the Netherlands and Belgium. In 1998 it was played at Efteling Golf Park, Loon op Zand, Netherlands, in 1999 at Prise d'Eau Golf Club, Tilburg, Netherlands and in 2000 and 2001 at Crayestein Golf Club, Dordrecht, Netherlands. In 2002 it was played at Flanders Nippon Golf, Hasselt, Limburg, Belgium while in 2003 it moved to Golf de Pierpont, Les Bons Villers, Hainaut, Belgium. The next European Senior Tour event played in the Netherlands was the Van Lanschot Senior Open in 2010. In 2003 the total prize money was €130,000 with the winner receiving €19,500.

== Winners ==
Year	Winner	Score	To par	Margin of victory	Runner(s)-up	Venue
Wallonia Open
2003	(United States) Hank Woodrome	210	−6	Playoff	(Northern Ireland) Eddie Polland	Golf de Pierpont
Legends in Golf
2002	(United States) Gary Wintz	205	−11	1 stroke	(England) Nick Job	Flanders Nippon Golf
2001	(Australia) David Good	204	−9	Playoff	(United States) Jerry Bruner	Crayestein
Ordina Legends in Golf
2000	(United States) John Grace	207	−6	1 stroke	(Northern Ireland) David Jones	Crayestein
1999	(England) Michael Slater	203	−13	4 strokes	(United States) Jerry Bruner (Scotland) David Huish	Prise d'Eau
Efteling European Trophy
1998	(Northern Ireland) Paul Leonard	204	−12	7 strokes	(England) Maurice Bembridge (England) Neil Coles (Republic of Ireland) Liam Higgins (Republic of Ireland) Denis O'Sullivan	Efteling
