= Digicel Jamaica Classic =

Tournament information
- Location: Montego Bay, Jamaica
- Established: 2003
- Course: Half Moon Golf Course
- Par: 72
- Length: 6,735 yards (6,158 m)
- Tour: European Senior Tour
- Format: Stroke play
- Prize fund: US$280,000
- Month played: March
- Final year: 2004

Tournament record score
- Aggregate: 208 Luis Carbonetti (2004); 208 Terry Gale (2004)
- To par: −8 as above

Final champion
- (Argentina) Luis Carbonetti
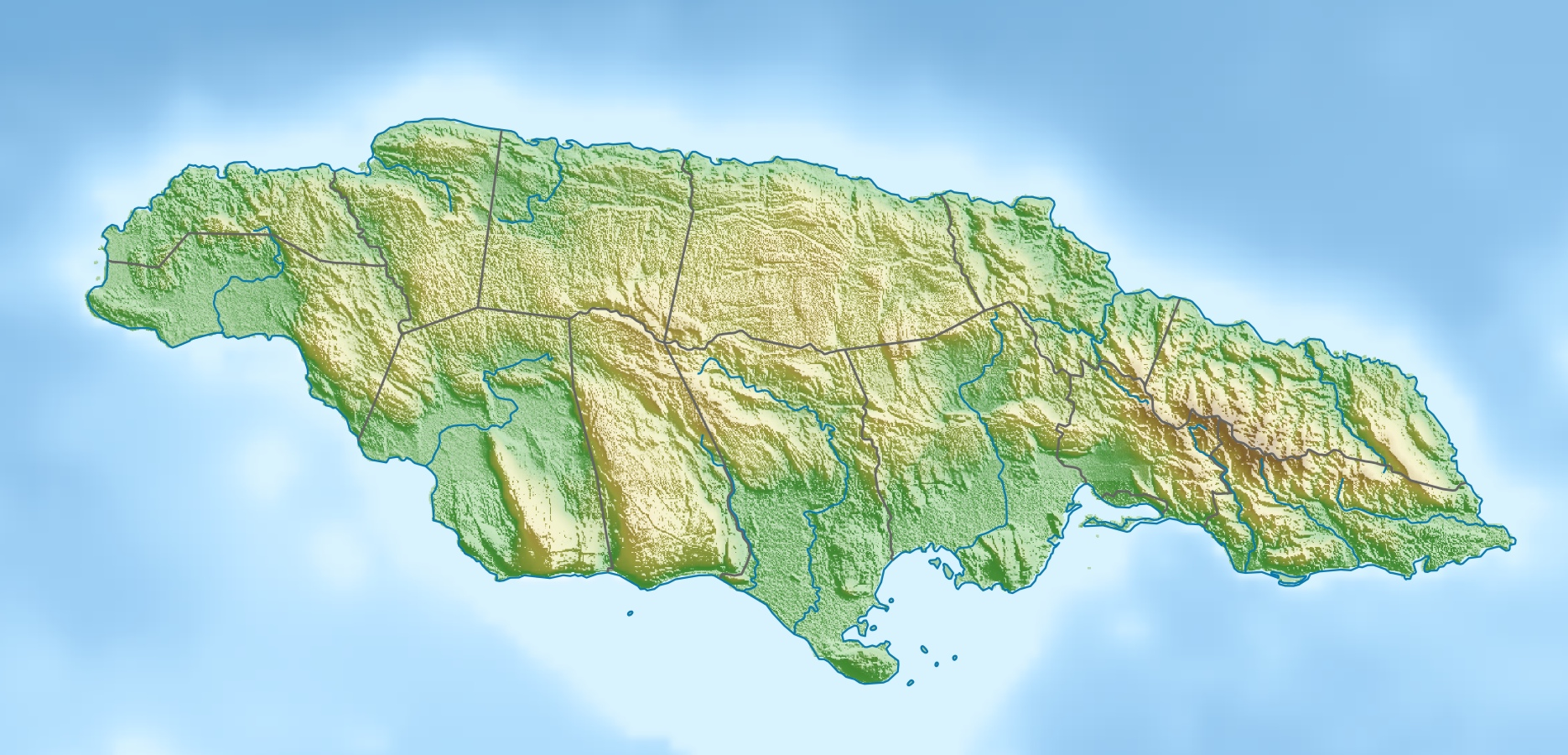
- Location in Jamaica

The Digicel Jamaica Classic in association with Sony Ericsson was a senior (over 50s) men's professional golf tournament played on the Caribbean island of Jamaica. It was an early season event on the European Seniors Tour, played in 2003 to 2004. It was played on the Half Moon Golf Course, Montego Bay. The events had prize money of US$250,000 with the winner receiving $37,500.

== Winners ==
Year	Winner	Score	To par	Margin of victory	Runner-up
2004	(Argentina) Luis Carbonetti	208	−8	Playoff	(Australia) Terry Gale
2003	(United States) Ray Carrasco	211	−5	1 stroke	(Spain) Manuel Piñero
