= Windsor Senior Masters =

Tournament information
- Location: Nairobi, Kenya
- Established: 1995
- Courses: Windsor Golf and Country Club
- Par: 72
- Tour: European Seniors Tour
- Format: Stroke play
- Prize fund: £54,000
- Month played: July
- Final year: 1995

Tournament record score
- Aggregate: 209 Brian Huggett (1995)
- To par: −7 as above

Final champion
- (Wales) Brian Huggett
- Location in Kenya

The Windsor Senior Masters was a men's senior (over 50) professional golf tournament on the European Seniors Tour, held at the Windsor Golf and Country Club, Kenya, north of the Nairobi, partly in Nairobi County and partly in Kiambu County. It was held just once, in March/April 1995, and was won by Brian Huggett who finished a shot ahead of Antonio Garrido.

== Winners ==
Year	Winner	Score	To par	Margin of victory	Runner-up
1995	(Wales) Brian Huggett	209	−7	1 stroke	(Spain) Antonio Garrido
