= 2003 European Seniors Tour =

Golf tour season

2003 European Seniors Tour season
- Duration: 21 March 2003 – 23 November 2003
- Number of official events: 22
- Most wins: (England) Carl Mason (4)
- Order of Merit: (England) Carl Mason
- Rookie of the Year: (England) Carl Mason

The 2003 European Seniors Tour was the 12th season of the European Seniors Tour, the main professional golf tour in Europe for men aged 50 and over.

== Schedule ==
The following table lists official events during the 2003 season.

Date	Tournament	Host country	Purse (€)	Winner (Note: The number in brackets after each winner's name is the number of European Seniors Tour events they had won up to and including that tournament. This information is only shown for European Seniors Tour members.)	Notes
23 Mar	Digicel Jamaica Classic	Jamaica	US$250,000	(United States) Ray Carrasco (2)	
29 Mar	Royal Westmoreland Barbados Open	Barbados	US$200,000	(Australia) Terry Gale (3)	
5 Apr	Tobago Plantations Seniors Classic	Trinidad and Tobago	US$200,000	(Australia) Terry Gale (4)	
18 May	AIB Irish Seniors Open	Ireland	330,000	(Australia) Noel Ratcliffe (7)	
25 May	Wallonia Open	Belgium	130,000	(United States) Hank Woodrome (1)	
8 Jun	Senior PGA Championship	United States	US$2,000,000	(United States) John Jacobs (n/a)	Senior major championship (Note: Official win; unofficial money.)
15 Jun	Irvine Whitlock Jersey Seniors Classic	Jersey	£100,000	(England) Malcolm Gregson (4)	
22 Jun	De Vere Northumberland Seniors Classic	England	£150,000	(United States) Jerry Bruner (2)	
29 Jun	U.S. Senior Open	United States	US$2,600,000	(United States) Bruce Lietzke (n/a)	Senior major championship
6 Jul	Ryder Cup Wales Seniors Open	Wales	£500,000	(Scotland) Bill Longmuir (1)	
13 Jul	Mobile Cup	England	£125,000	(England) Carl Mason (1)	
27 Jul	Senior British Open	Scotland	US$1,600,000	(United States) Tom Watson (n/a)	Senior major championship
3 Aug	De Vere PGA Seniors Championship	England	£200,000	(Scotland) Bill Longmuir (2)	
10 Aug	Bad Ragaz PGA Seniors Open	Switzerland	160,000	(Argentina) Horacio Carbonetti (1)	
17 Aug	Travis Perkins Senior Masters	England	£225,000	(Scotland) John Chillas (1)	
24 Aug	Nigel Mansell Classic	England	£150,000	(Scotland) Mike Miller (1)	New tournament
31 Aug	Charles Church Scottish Seniors Open	Scotland	£150,000	(Australia) Terry Gale (5)	
7 Sep	Bovis Lend Lease European Senior Masters	England	£225,000	(Northern Ireland) Paul Leonard (2)	
20 Sep	The Daily Telegraph Turismo Andaluz Seniors Match Play Championship	Spain	£100,000	(England) Carl Mason (2)	
28 Sep	Merseyside English Seniors Open	Spain	£150,000	(England) Carl Mason (3)	New tournament
4 Oct	Tunisian Seniors Open	Tunisia	£125,000	(Australia) David Good (2)	
12 Oct	Estoril Seniors Tour Championship	Portugal	240,000	(England) Carl Mason (4)	Tour Championship

=== Unofficial events ===
The following events were sanctioned by the European Seniors Tour, but did not carry official money, nor were wins official.

Date	Tournament	Host country	Purse (€)	Winners	Notes
23 Nov	UBS Cup	United States	US$3,000,000	Tie ( Team USA retain)	Team event

== Order of Merit ==
The Order of Merit was based on prize money won during the season, calculated in Euros.

Position	Player	Prize money (€)
1	(England) Carl Mason	350,242
2	(Scotland) Bill Longmuir	253,667
3	(Australia) Terry Gale	195,727
4	(Scotland) John Chillas	190,003
5	(England) Denis Durnian	146,604

== Awards ==
Award	Winner	Ref.
Rookie of the Year	(England) Carl Mason	
