= 1995 European Seniors Tour =

Golf tour season

1995 European Seniors Tour season
- Duration: 30 March 1995 – 7 October 1995
- Number of official events: 11
- Most wins: (Wales) Brian Huggett (2)
- Order of Merit: (Scotland) Brian Barnes

The 1995 European Seniors Tour was the fourth season of the European Seniors Tour, the main professional golf tour in Europe for men aged 50 and over.

== Schedule ==
The following table lists official events during the 1995 season.

Date	Tournament	Host country	Purse (£)	Winner (Note: The number in brackets after each winner's name is the number of European Seniors Tour events they had won up to and including that tournament. This information is only shown for European Seniors Tour members.)	Notes
1 Apr	Windsor Senior Masters	Kenya	54,000	(Wales) Brian Huggett (6)	New tournament
16 Jul	International German PGA Seniors Championship	Germany	80,000	(Italy) Renato Campagnoli (1)	New tournament
30 Jul	Senior British Open	Northern Ireland	350,000	(Scotland) Brian Barnes (1)	Senior major championship
4 Aug	Lawrence Batley Seniors	England	70,000	(Italy) Alberto Croce (1)	
13 Aug	Forte PGA Seniors Championship	England	90,000	(England) John Morgan (4)	
20 Aug	Northern Electric Seniors	England	60,000	(England) Brian Waites (2)	
26 Aug	Collingtree Seniors	England	52,000	(England) Neil Coles (3)	
3 Sep	Shell Scottish Seniors Open	Scotland	100,000	(Wales) Brian Huggett (7)	
10 Sep	De Vere Hotels Seniors Classic	England	60,000	(England) Tommy Horton (7)	New tournament
1 Oct	London Masters	England	80,000	(South Africa) John Bland (1)	New tournament
7 Oct	Senior Zurich Lexus Trophy	Switzerland	60,000	(Republic of Ireland) Liam Higgins (3)	

== Order of Merit ==
The Order of Merit was based on prize money won during the season, calculated in Pound sterling.

Position	Player	Prize money (£)
1	(Scotland) Brian Barnes	63,620
2	(England) John Morgan	57,984
3	(Wales) Brian Huggett	50,011
4	(England) Tommy Horton	44,886
5	(England) Neil Coles	41,902
