= Pete Oakley =

American professional golfer (born 1949)

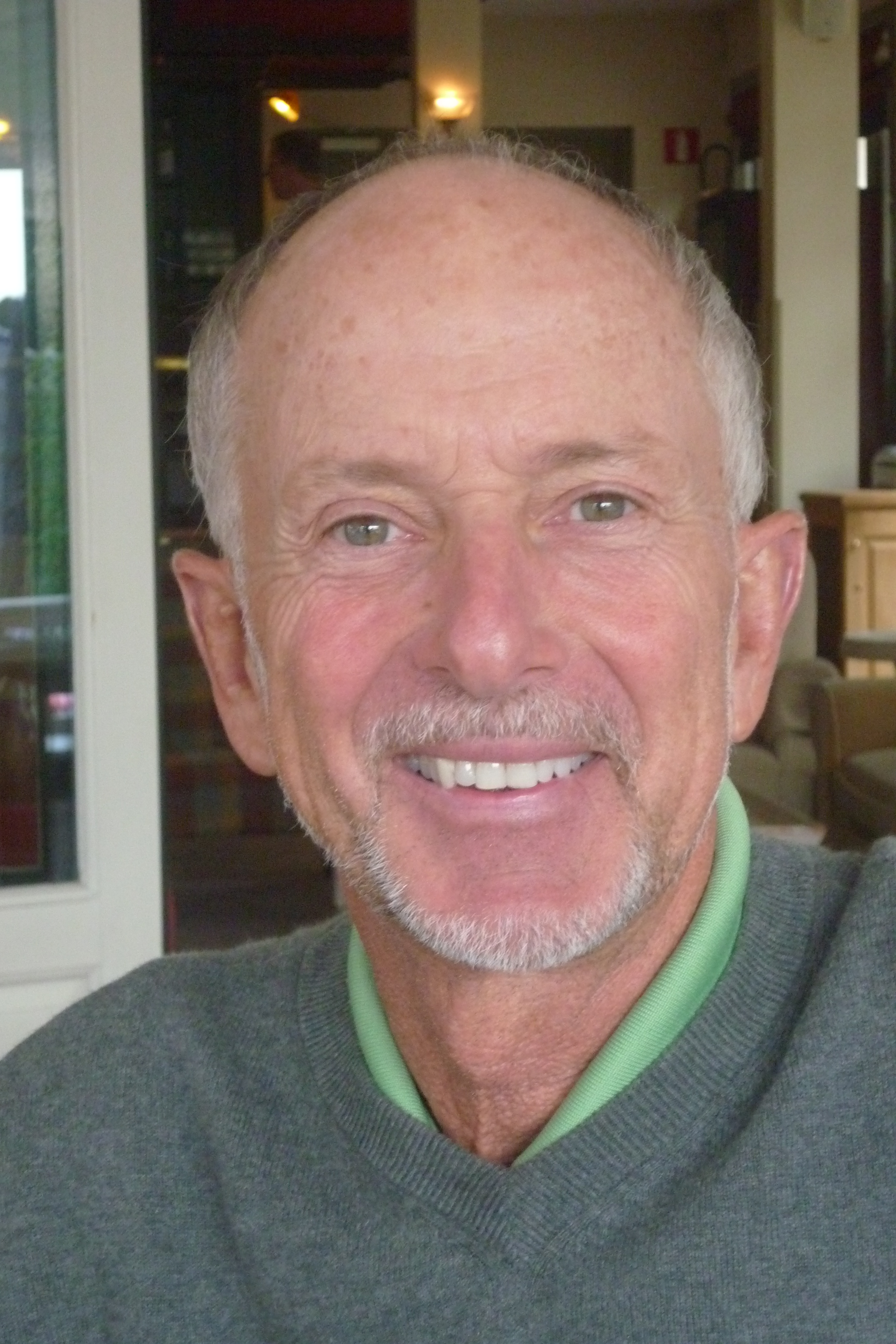
- Oakley in 2010

Personal information
- Full name: Peter Hal Oakley
- Nationality: United States
- Born: June 28, 1949 (age 77) Panama City, Florida, U.S.
- Height: 5 ft 7 in (1.70 m)
- Weight: 155 lb (70 kg; 11.1 st)
- Spouse: Sandra Jane
- Children: 2

Career
- Sport: Golf
- College: Santa Fe Community College
- Turned professional: 1974
- Former tours: Champions Tour; European Seniors Tour
- Professional wins: 17

Number of wins by tour
- PGA Tour Champions: 1
- European Senior Tour: 1
- Other: 16

Best results in major championships
- Masters Tournament: DNP
- PGA Championship: CUT: 1983, 1986, 1987, 1994, 1995, 1997
- U.S. Open: CUT: 1975, 1980, 1983
- The Open Championship: CUT: 2005

Achievements and awards
- European Seniors Tour Rookie of the Year: 2004

Peter Hal Oakley (born June 28, 1949) is an American professional golfer best known for winning the 2004 Senior British Open, one of the major championships in senior men's professional golf. He is the younger brother of golfer David Oakley.

== Early life ==
Oakley was born in Panama City, Florida. He got started in the game at age 11 by his mother, who thought a nearby nine-hole course would be a great babysitter for him and his brother David.

== Professional career ==
Oakley was a long-time club pro in the Philadelphia-Delaware area where he won numerous sectional titles including the Delaware State Open six times and the Shawnee Open six times. He played some on the Nationwide Tour in his forties to prepare himself for the Champions Tour.

The biggest win of his career was his first on the Champions Tour, and came in a major – The 2004 Senior British Open played at Royal Portrush Golf Club in Northern Ireland. Oakley sank a 10-foot par putt on the final hole to win by one stroke and avoid a playoff with Tom Kite and Eduardo Romero. The victory made him only the 10th open qualifier to win a Champions Tour event.

In 2008, he had his best season since 2004, when he finished fifth in the Russian Seniors Open en route to ending the year 29th in the 2008 European Senior Tour Order Of Merit.

Oakley has done some golf course design work. In 2001, he completed and opened (with partner Chris Adkins) a public course in Milton, Delaware, called The Rookery Golf Club.

== Personal life ==
His wife has caddied for him in professional tournaments. His son's, Zachary (Zac) and Jeremy Joseph (J.J.), are also golfers. Zac was a three-time All-American at Wesley College, and J.J. played at the University of Delaware. Oakley is a man of strong religious faith.

He formerly lived in Lincoln, Delaware and has moved to Palm City, Florida.

== Awards and honors ==
- Oakley was awarded the Player of the Year for the Philadelphia Section of the PGA of America in 1980, 1984, 1999, and 2000.
- Oakley was awarded 2004 European Seniors Tour Rookie of the Year.

== Professional wins (18) ==
=== Regular career wins (14) ===
- 1980 Delaware State Open, Shawnee Open
- 1983 Shawnee Open
- 1984 Shawnee Open
- 1986 Delaware State Open, Shawnee Open
- 1987 Delaware State Open
- 1989 Philadelphia Open Championship, Delaware State Open
- 1990 Philadelphia Open Championship
- 1995 Delaware State Open
- 1998 Shawnee Open
- 1999 Shawnee Open
- 2000 Delaware State Open

=== Champions Tour wins (1) ===
Legend
Senior major championships (1)
Other Champions Tour (0)

No.	Date	Tournament	Winning score	Margin of victory	Runners-up
1	Jul 25, 2004	The Senior British Open Championship	−4 (73-68-73-70=284)	1 stroke	(United States) Tom Kite, (Argentina) Eduardo Romero

=== European Seniors Tour wins (1) ===
Legend
Senior major championships (1)
Other European Seniors Tour (0)

No.	Date	Tournament	Winning score	Margin of victory	Runners-up
1	Jul 25, 2004	The Senior British Open Championship	−4 (73-68-73-70=284)	1 stroke	(United States) Tom Kite, (Argentina) Eduardo Romero

=== Other senior wins (2) ===
- 1999 PGA Senior Club Pro Championship
- 2000 PGA Senior Stroke Play Championship

== Results in major championships ==
!Tournament	1975	1976	1977	1978	1979
U.S. Open	CUT				
The Open Championship					
PGA Championship					

!Tournament	1980	1981	1982	1983	1984	1985	1986	1987	1988	1989
U.S. Open	CUT			CUT						
The Open Championship										
PGA Championship				CUT			CUT	CUT		

!Tournament	1990	1991	1992	1993	1994	1995	1996	1997	1998	1999
U.S. Open										
The Open Championship										
PGA Championship					CUT	CUT		CUT		

!Tournament	2000	2001	2002	2003	2004	2005
U.S. Open						
The Open Championship						CUT
PGA Championship						

Did not play

CUT = missed the halfway cut
Note: Oakley never played in the Masters Tournament.

== Senior major championships ==
=== Wins (1) ===
Year	Championship	Winning score	Margin	Runners-up
2004	Senior British Open Championship	−4 (73-68-73-70=284)	1 stroke	(United States) Tom Kite, (Argentina) Eduardo Romero

== U.S. national team appearances ==
- PGA Cup: 1994 (winners)
