= 2001 European Seniors Tour =

Golf tour season

2001 European Seniors Tour season
- Duration: 29 March 2001 – 4 November 2001
- Number of official events: 21 (Note: One further tournament was scheduled but was cancelled.)
- Most wins: (Japan) Seiji Ebihara (2) (Republic of Ireland) Denis O'Sullivan (2) (Australia) Noel Ratcliffe (2) (Australia) Ian Stanley (2)
- Order of Merit: (Australia) Ian Stanley
- Rookie of the Year: (New Zealand) Simon Owen

The 2001 European Seniors Tour was the 10th season of the European Seniors Tour, the main professional golf tour in Europe for men aged 50 and over.

== Schedule ==
The following table lists official events during the 2001 season.

Date	Tournament	Host country	Purse (€)	Winner (Note: The number in brackets after each winner's name is the number of European Seniors Tour events they had won up to and including that tournament. This information is only shown for European Seniors Tour members.)	Notes
31 Mar	Royal Westmoreland Barbados Open	Barbados	US$175,000	(Brazil) Priscillo Diniz (2)	
5 May	Beko Classic	Turkey	US$325,000	(Australia) Noel Ratcliffe (5)	
13 May	AIB Irish Seniors Open	Ireland	320,000	(Japan) Seiji Ebihara (1)	
3 Jun	De Vere PGA Seniors Championship	England	£200,000	(Australia) Ian Stanley (2)	
10 Jun	Wales Seniors Open	Wales	£500,000	(England) Denis Durnian (1)	New tournament
17 Jun	Microlease Jersey Seniors Masters	Jersey	£100,000	(Japan) Seiji Ebihara (2)	
24 Jun	Palmerston Trophy Berlin	Germany	200,000	(Republic of Ireland) Denis O'Sullivan (3)	New tournament
30 Jun	Lawrence Batley Seniors	England	£120,000	(England) Nick Job (2)	
15 Jul	STC Scandinavian International	Sweden	£225,000	(Republic of Ireland) Denis O'Sullivan (4)	New tournament
29 Jul	Senior British Open	Northern Ireland	£500,000	(Australia) Ian Stanley (3)	Senior major championship
5 Aug	De Vere Hotels Seniors Classic	England	£150,000	(Australia) Noel Ratcliffe (6)	
12 Aug	Bad Ragaz PGA Seniors Open	Switzerland	200,000	(Scotland) David Huish (5)	
19 Aug	Energis Senior Masters	England	£225,000	(United States) David Oakley (3)	
26 Aug	Legends in Golf	Netherlands	175,000	(Australia) David Good (1)	
2 Sep	Scottish Seniors Open	Scotland	£150,000	(United States) David Oakley (4)	
9 Sep	STC Bovis Lend Lease European Invitational	England	£225,000	(Australia) Bob Shearer (4)	New tournament
~~16 Sep~~	Big 3 Records Monte Carlo Invitational	France	–	Cancelled	
23 Sep	TEMES Seniors Open	Greece	200,000	(Scotland) Russell Weir (1)	
7 Oct	Dan Technology Senior Tournament of Champions	England	£150,000	(Jamaica) Delroy Cambridge (1)	
19 Oct	Tunisian Seniors Open	Tunisia	£100,000	(New Zealand) Simon Owen (1)	New tournament
27 Oct	SSL International Sodexho Match Play Championship	Portugal	£100,000	(England) Jim Rhodes (1)	
4 Nov	Estoril Seniors Tour Championship	Spain	£225,000	(United States) Jerry Bruner (1)	Tour Championship

=== Unofficial events ===
The following events were sanctioned by the European Seniors Tour, but did not carry official money, nor were wins official.

Date	Tournament	Host country	Purse (€)	Winners	Notes
18 Nov	UBS Warburg Cup	United States	US$3,000,000	Team USA	New team event

== Order of Merit ==
The Order of Merit was based on prize money won during the season, calculated in Euros.

Position	Player	Prize money (€)
1	(Australia) Ian Stanley	287,025
2	(England) Denis Durnian	276,623
3	(Australia) Noel Ratcliffe	218,685
4	(Australia) David Good	214,500
5	(United States) Jerry Bruner	214,457

== Awards ==
Award	Winner	Ref.
Rookie of the Year	(New Zealand) Simon Owen	
