= Kyusyu Open =

Tournament information
- Location: Kyushu, Japan
- Established: 1971
- Tour: Japan Golf Tour
- Format: Stroke play

Tournament record score
- Aggregate: 269 Yūsaku Miyazato (2013)
- To par: −19 as above

Current champion
- (Japan) Shota Akiyoshi

The Kyusyu Open is a professional golf tournament that is held on Japan's southern island, Kyushu. It was first played in 1971 and was a Japan Golf Tour event from 1973 until 1991.

== Winners ==
Year	Winner (Note: (a) – Amateur.)	Score	To par	Margin of victory	Runner(s)-up	Venue
2026	Shori Ishizuka	202	-11	Playoff	Yuki Inamori	Fukuoka CC
2025	Riito Mieno	269	-19	4 strokes	Shori Ishizuka; Koumei Oda	Genkai GC
2024	Hiroki Hayashi	284	−4	Playoff	Haruo Fujishima	Oita CC (Tsukigata)
2023	Yuta Komura	277	−11	2 strokes	Motoki Tanaka	Kumamoto Kumo CC
2022	Noriyuki Kurogi	208	−8	1 stroke	Shohei Karimata	PGM Golf Resort Okinawa
2021	Jinichiro Kozuma	271	−9	2 strokes	Koumei Oda	Saga Classic GC
2020	Shota Akiyoshi	197	−13	Playoff	Hiroyo Ikemura	Oita Tokyu GC
2019	Taichi Teshima	272	−12	2 strokes	Rito Mieno	Nishinihon CC
2018	Kazuki Higa	270	−14	1 stroke	Kiji Kuroki	Takamaki CC
2017	Kitamura Koichi	267	−13	3 strokes	Daijiro Izumida	Ogori CC
2016	Ryuichi Oda	272	−16	Playoff	Shogo Sakurai; Yu Suzuki	Miyazaki Lakeside GC
2015	Shotaro Wada	211 (Note: Tournament reduced to 54 holes due to rain.)	−5	2 strokes	Daijiro Izumida; Taisei Shimizu (a)	Asoozu GC
2014	Kitamura Koichi	277	−11	2 strokes	Yūsaku Miyazato; Koumei Oda	Kise CC
2013	Yūsaku Miyazato	269	−19	5 strokes	Koumei Oda	Passage Kinkai Island GC
2012	Kentaro Yonekura	207	−9	1 stroke	Yasunobu Fukunaga	Saga Classic GC
2011	Mitsunobu Fukunaga	215	−1	2 strokes	Tokimatsu Genzo (a)	Oita CC (Tsukigata)
2010	Tatsuya Takamatsu	201	−12	4 strokes	Tsutomu Ikeda; Tomoaki Ueda	The Classic GC
2009	Tadaaki Kimura	206	−4	3 strokes	Kentaro Yonekura	Minamikyushu CC
2008	Tomohiko Ogata (a)	205	−8	2 strokes	Masayuki Fukahori	Yasukogen CC
2007	Tadaaki Kimura	208	−5	2 strokes	Motoki Hieda	UMK CC
2006	Hidezumi Shirakata	205	−11	Playoff	Toru Shindome	Tamana CC
2005	Kiyoshi Okura (a)	210	−6	1 stroke	Hideki Haraguchi	Nagasaki International GC
2004	Yukata Horinouchi	209	−7	Playoff	Takao Nogami	Saga Royal GC
2003	Hidezumi Shirakata	205	−5	Playoff	Konosuke Kusakabe	Oita Tokyu GC
2002	Kazuhiro Kinjo	139	−5	Playoff	Taimur Hussain; Mitsutaka Kusakabe	Shimadzu GC
2001	Mitsukasa Kusakabe	140	−4	Playoff	Masanori Kijima	Wakamatsu GC
2000	Takao Nogami	140	−4	1 stroke	Toyoichi Hioki	Kumamoto Kuko CC
1999	Kazuhiro Kinjo	281	−7	3 strokes	Nao Nakamura; Takao Nogami; Seamount Takashi	JR Uchino CC
1998	Tsunehisa Yamamoto	290	+2	Playoff	Takao Nogami; Taichi Teshima	Kumamoto Central CC
1997	Noburu Fujiike	206 (Note: Tournament reduced to 54 holes.)	−10	1 stroke	Mitsutaka Kusakabe	Karatsu CC
1996	Kosei Sakai	281	−7	1 stroke	Keiji Teshima	Ito GC
1995	Kinpachi Yoshimura	245 (Note: Tournament reduced to 63 holes due to bad weather.)	−7	6 strokes	Kenji Urata	Wakagi GC
1994	Mitsukasa Kusakabe	281	−7	2 strokes	Kosaku Makizaka	Nishinihon CC
1993	Katsuyoshi Tomori	281	−7	3 strokes	Tatsuhiko Takahashi	Tamana CC
1992	Norikazu Kawakami	283	−5	2 strokes	Katsuyoshi Tomori	Kumamoto Kuko CC
1991	Kinpachi Yoshimura	290	+2	2 strokes	Isamu Sugita	Kirishima GC
1990	Katsuyoshi Tomori	277	−11	6 strokes	Keiji Teshima; Kinpachi Yoshimura	Dazaifu GC
1989	Shinji Kuraoka	287	−1	Playoff	Katsuyoshi Tomori	Kumamoto Central CC
1988	Katsuyoshi Tomori	283	−5	3 strokes	Kiyotaka Oie (a)	Oita CC (Tsukigata)
1987	Katsuyoshi Tomori	288	E	1 stroke	Kosei Sakai	Asoiizuka GC
1986	Kinpachi Yoshimura	281	−7	4 strokes	Norikazu Kawakami; Kiyotaka Oie (a); Katsuyoshi Tomori	Kagoshima Kuko 36 CC
1985	Kinpachi Yoshimura	283	−5	1 stroke	Norikazu Kawakami	Yasukogen CC
1984	Toshiya Shibutani	288	E	6 strokes	Norio Suzuki	Kumamoto Kuko CC
1983	Noboru Fujiike	288	E	1 stroke	Tatsuya Shiraishi	Wakamatsu GC
1982	Norio Suzuki	291	+3	2 strokes	Kinpachi Yoshimura	Kyushu Shima CC
1981	Yurio Akitomi	289	+1	4 strokes	Norio Suzuki; Katsuyoshi Tomori	Genkai GC
1980	Yurio Akitomi	283	−5	1 stroke	Norio Suzuki	Dazaifu GC
1979	Yurio Akitomi	283	−5	8 strokes	Takeru Sato; Isamu Sugita	Nagasaki International GC
1978	Norio Suzuki	293	+5	1 stroke	Yurio Akitomi; Satoshi Ichinose	Ogura CC
1977	Norio Suzuki	284	−4	6 strokes	Tetsuhiro Ueda	Dazaifu GC
1976	Norio Suzuki	285	−3	Playoff	Katsuji Yanagita	Fukuoka CC
1975	Norio Suzuki	283	−5	4 strokes	Katsuji Yanagita	Moji GC
1974	Norio Suzuki	290	+2	5 strokes	Kenji Ueda	Nagasaki International GC
1973	Kunio Koike	287	−1	2 strokes	Norio Suzuki	Fukuoka CC
1972	Noburu Shidata	283	−5	6 strokes	Tetsuhiro Ueda	Minamikyushu CC
1971	Katsuji Yanagida	224	+8	1 stroke	Yoshimasa Fujii	Aso GC
