= Castelló Masters =

Tournament information
- Location: Castellón, Spain
- Established: 2008
- Course: Club de Campo del Mediterráneo
- Par: 71
- Length: 7,073 yards (6,468 m)
- Tour: European Tour
- Format: Stroke play
- Prize fund: €2,000,000
- Month played: October
- Final year: 2011

Tournament record score
- Aggregate: 264 Sergio García (2008); 264 Michael Jonzon (2009)
- To par: −20 as above

Final champion
- (Spain) Sergio García

Location map
- Location in Spain Location in the Province of Castellón

The Castelló Masters was a European Tour golf tournament that was played annually from 2008 through 2011. The event was held at the Club de Campo del Mediterráneo in Castellón, Spain.

The inaugural event was won by Sergio García, who also happened to be the tournament host, having grown up playing golf on the course where his father is the club professional. García finished on a 20-under-par total of 264, winning by a margin of three strokes over Peter Hedblom.

In 2010, 17-year-old Italian Matteo Manassero became the youngest-ever winner on the European Tour when he triumphed by 4 strokes over Ignacio Garrido.

In 2011, Sergio García shot which would have been the lowest aggregate on the European Tour at the time, however this record did not count as preferred lies were in place during the week.

== Winners ==
Year	Winner	Score	To par	Margin of victory	Runner(s)-up
Castelló Masters
2011	(Spain) Sergio García (2)	257 (Note: Unofficial scoring record due to preferred lies being in place.)	−27	11 strokes	(Spain) Gonzalo Fernández-Castaño
Castelló Masters Costa Azahar
2010	(Italy) Matteo Manassero	268	−16	4 strokes	(Spain) Ignacio Garrido
2009	(Sweden) Michael Jonzon	264	−20	1 stroke	(Germany) Martin Kaymer (Sweden) Christian Nilsson
2008	(Spain) Sergio García	264	−20	3 strokes	(Sweden) Peter Hedblom
