= Club de Campo del Mediterráneo =

Country club in Castellón, Spain

Coordinates: 40°02′04″N 0°03′16″W

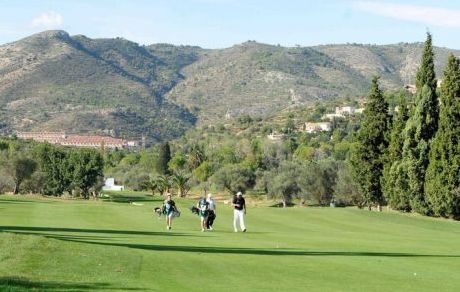

Club de Campo del Mediterráneo is a country club located in Castellón, Spain. Opened in 1978, the Ramon Espinosa designed golf course was the venue for the former European Tour event, the Castelló Masters Costa Azahar. The inaugural tournament, held in October 2008, was won by home favourite Sergio García, whose father is also the club professional.
