= Slaley Hall =

- View of Slaley Hall

- Location in Northumberland

General information
- Location: Northumberland, England, UK
- Coordinates: 54.896°N 2.016°W
- OS grid: NY990556

Slaley Hall is a country house near the village of Slaley and near to the Derwent reservoir. It was built as a hunting and shooting lodge by the Hunting family between 1912–1914. It was then bought by Major Jonathan Lee (Jack) Priestman and Christine Priestman nee Long (formerly of Shotley Park, Shotley Bridge) in 1947. After Mrs Priestman’s death in the mid eighties it was sold and vastly expanded and developed into a hotel and golf resort by local developers Seamus O'Carroll and John Rourke. Slaley hosted The Great North Open between 1996 and 2002. It is surrounded by 1000 acres (4 km^{2}) of Northumberland forest and moorland. It also hosts Weddings, Anniversaries, Parties and Business events in the hotel run by the QHotels Group.

It has many facilities including an indoor swimming pool, beauty salon, steam room, sauna, gym, sun beds, Jacuzzi, and driving range.

The England Football team have stayed at Slaley Hall for fixtures in the North East of England.

The grounds include the Japanese Garden, a rare surviving example of a rock garden. It was designed and laid out before the First World War.
