= Simon Owen =

New Zealand professional golfer (born 1950)

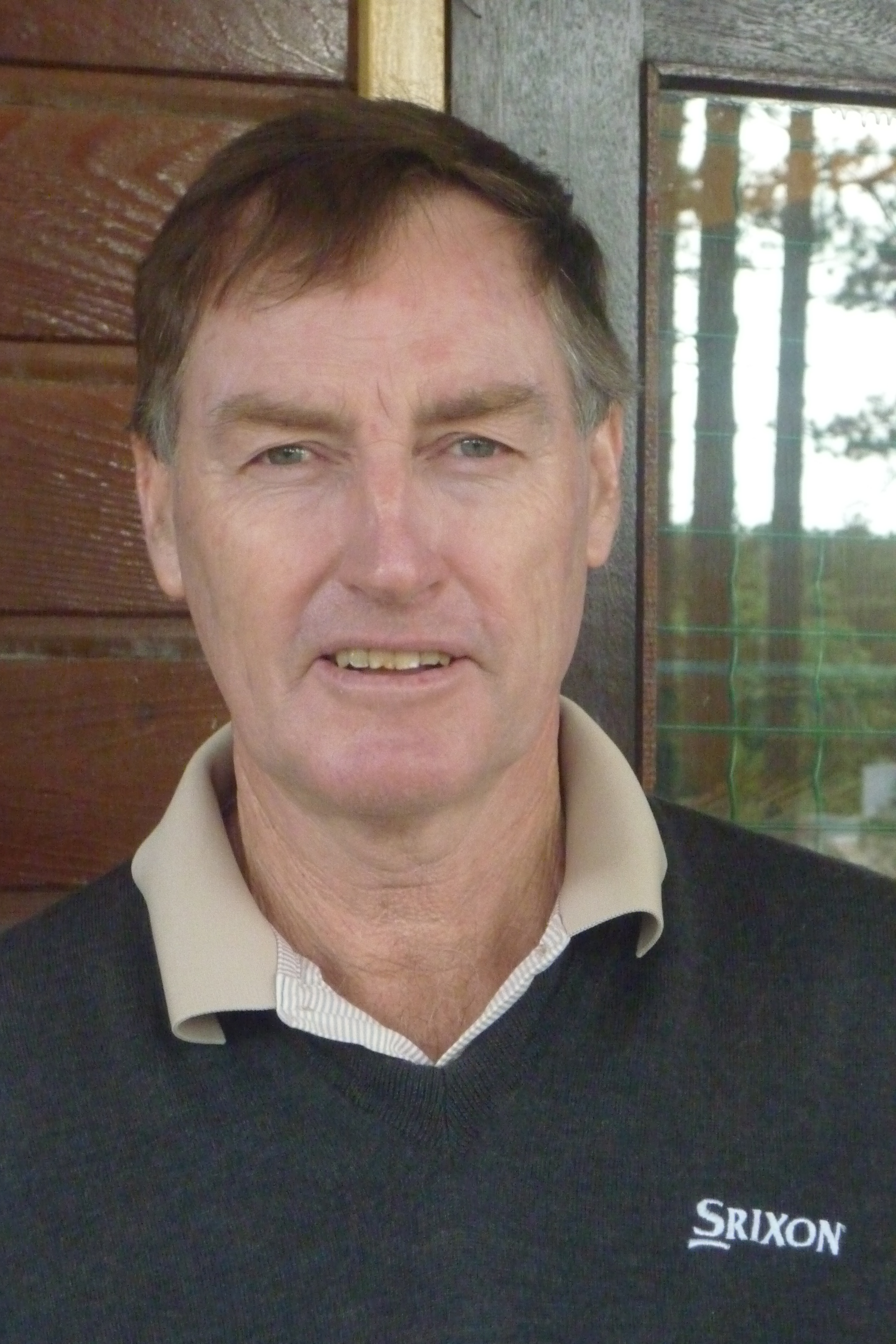

Personal information
- Full name: Simon Owen
- Nationality: New Zealand
- Born: 10 December 1950 (age 75) Wanganui, New Zealand
- Height: 1.88 m (6 ft 2 in)

Career
- Sport: Golf
- Turned professional: 1971
- Former tours: European Tour; PGA Tour of Australasia; Asian PGA Tour; European Seniors Tour; PGA of Australia Legends Tour
- Professional wins: 19

Number of wins by tour
- European Tour: 2
- PGA Tour of Australasia: 1
- European Senior Tour: 2
- Other: 8 (regular); 6 (senior)

Best results in major championships
- Masters Tournament: CUT: 1979
- PGA Championship: DNP
- U.S. Open: DNP
- The Open Championship: T2: 1978

Achievements and awards
- European Seniors Tour Rookie of the Year: 2001

Simon Owen (born 10 December 1950) is a professional golfer from New Zealand.

== Career ==
Owen was born in Wanganui. He received his secondary education at St Augustines College, Wanganui.

In 1971, Owen turned professional. He won several tournaments in Australasia. He played on the European Tour from the mid-1970s to the mid-1980s, winning the 1974 German Open and the 1976 Double Diamond Individual Championship. His best finish on the European Tour Order of Merit was eleventh in 1974. His best finish in a major was at the 1978 Open Championship, when he finished tied for second behind Jack Nicklaus. Earlier in the year he finished in second place at the Malaysian Dunlop Masters.

Since 2001 Owen has played senior professional golf, and he has won two tournaments on the European Seniors Tour. He has also won the New Zealand PGA Seniors Championship on two occasions.

Owen's brother Craig is also a professional golfer and played for New Zealand in the World Cup in 1979 and 1980.

== Professional wins (19) ==
=== European Tour wins (2) ===
No.	Date	Tournament	Winning score	Margin of victory	Runner(s)-up
1	4 Aug 1974	German Open	−12 (69-68-70-69=276)	Playoff	(England) Peter Oosterhuis
2	18 Aug 1976	Double Diamond Individual Championship	−8 (65-67=132)	2 strokes	(Wales) Brian Huggett, (Scotland) David Ingram

European Tour playoff record (1–0)

No.	Year	Tournament	Opponent	Result
1	1974	German Open	(England) Peter Oosterhuis	Won with birdie on first extra hole

=== PGA Tour of Australia wins (1) ===
No.	Date	Tournament	Winning score	Margin of victory	Runners-up
1	24 Feb 1980	Dunhill South Australian Open	+3 (75-73-71-72=291)	1 stroke	(Australia) Rodger Davis, (Australia) Greg Norman

=== New Zealand Golf Circuit wins (2) ===
No.	Date	Tournament	Winning score	Margin of victory	Runner-up
1	5 Dec 1976	New Zealand Open	−8 (70-69-73-72=284)	7 strokes	(England) Doug McClelland
2	3 Jan 1978	New Zealand PGA Championship	−6 (73-70-64-67=274)	1 stroke	(England) Guy Wolstenholme

=== Other New Zealand wins (3) ===
- 1984 Hawkes Bay 72 Hole Classic (New Zealand)
- 1989 Hawkes Bay 72 Hole Classic (New Zealand)
- 1990 City of Auckland 72 Hole Classic

=== Other wins (3) ===
- 1972 Air New Zealand Fiji Open
- 1991 Tahiti Open, Cable & Wireless - Pacific Harbour Open (Fiji)

=== European Seniors Tour wins (2) ===
No.	Date	Tournament	Winning score	Margin of victory	Runner(s)-up
1	19 Oct 2001	Tunisian Seniors Open	−8 (69-73-66=208)	Playoff	(United States) Bob Lendzion
2	20 May 2007	Sharp Italian Seniors Open	−8 (70-65-73=208)	Playoff	(England) Tony Allen, (United States) John Benda, (England) Carl Mason

European Seniors Tour playoff record (2–0)

No.	Year	Tournament	Opponents	Result
1	2001	Tunisian Seniors Open	(United States) Bob Lendzion	Won with birdie on second extra hole
2	2007	Sharp Italian Seniors Open	(England) Tony Allen, (United States) John Benda, (England) Carl Mason	Won with birdie on first extra hole

=== PGA of Australia Legends Tour wins (3) ===
note: this list is probably incomplete

- 2014 Audi Soltaire Legends Pro-Am (with Peter Fowler), Australian PGA Seniors Championship
- 2015 The Stirling Golf Club Legends Pro-Am

=== Other senior wins (2) ===
- 2001 New Zealand PGA Seniors Championship
- 2003 New Zealand PGA Seniors Championship

== Results in major championships ==
Tournament	1975	1976	1977	1978	1979	1980	1981	1982	1983	1984
Masters Tournament					CUT					
The Open Championship	CUT	CUT	CUT	T2	T13	64	T23	CUT		CUT

Note: Owen only played in the Masters Tournament and The Open Championship.

Top 10
Did not play

CUT = missed the half-way cut (3rd round cut in 1977 and 1982 Open Championships)
"T" indicates a tie for a place

== Team appearances ==
- Dunhill Cup (representing New Zealand): 1989, 1990
- World Cup (representing New Zealand): 1973, 1976, 1989
