= David Good (golfer) =

Australian professional golfer (born 1947)

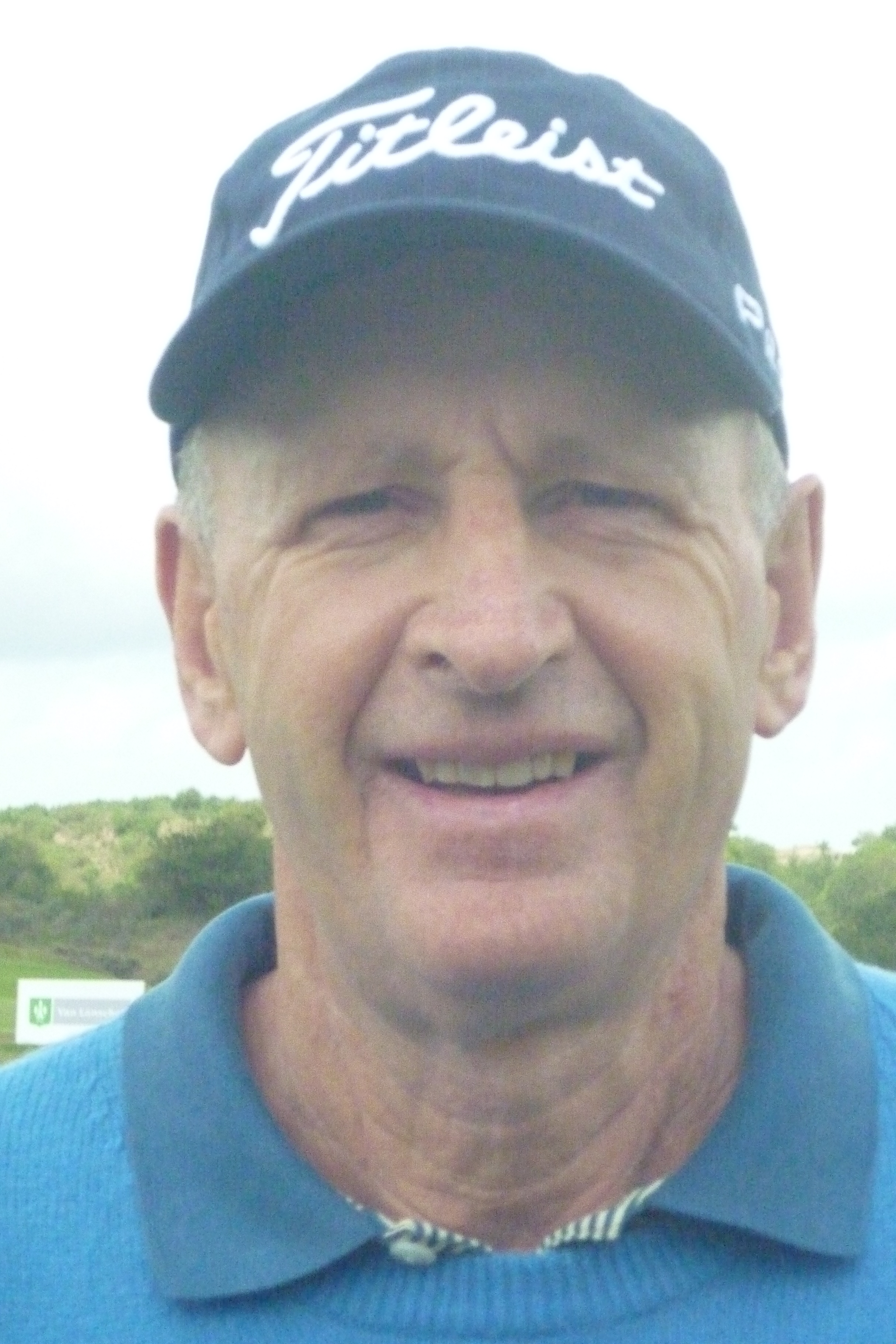
- Good in 2011

Personal information
- Full name: David James Good
- Nationality: Australia
- Born: 18 December 1947 (age 78) Devonport, Tasmania, Australia

Career
- Sport: Golf
- Turned professional: 1969
- Former tour: European Senior Tour
- Professional wins: 8

Number of wins by tour
- PGA Tour of Australasia: 2
- European Senior Tour: 2
- Other: 3

Best results in major championships
- Masters Tournament: DNP
- PGA Championship: DNP
- U.S. Open: DNP
- The Open Championship: T18: 1973

Achievements and awards
- New Zealand Golf Circuit money list winner: 1977–78

David James Good (born 18 December 1947) is an Australian professional golfer. He had some success in the 1970s but is most noted for his record as a senior player. From 2000 he played regularly on the European Senior Tour, where he won twice and had nearly 50 top-10 finishes.

== Professional career ==
In 1947, Good was born. He turned professional after the 1969 Australian Amateur at Royal Adelaide. He was the medalist after rounds of 71 and 70 but lost in the quarter-finals.

In 1973, Good traveled to Europe. He had limited success but qualified for the Open Championship at Troon and finished tied for 18th place. Later in the year, he came close to his first important win in the 1973 Garden City Classic in Christchurch, New Zealand. He had a 7-stroke lead after 3 rounds but had a final round of 77 and was beaten by John Lister who had a final round 67. Good shared second place with Bob Shearer. In 1974, he was affected by viral arthritis and spent some time out of golf.

Good won the Tasmanian Open in early 1976, winning a four-man playoff. He finished level with Stewart Ginn, Brian Jones and Ian Stanley. Ginn and Stanley were eliminated at the first extra hole and Good finally beat Jones at the fifth extra hole, making an eight-metre putt. In October, he came close to winning the South Coast Open. Leading after three rounds, he finished a stroke behind Barry Burgess and shared the runner-up place. At the end of the year, he was also runner-up in the Waikato Charity Classic in Hamilton, New Zealand, 7 shots behind John Lister.

In October 1977, Good won the New Zealand Airlines Open beating Bill Dunk, winning with a par at the first hole of a sudden-death playoff. The following week, he was runner-up in the CBA West Lakes Classic, five strokes behind Bob Shearer. At the end of the year, he played with Mike Cahill in the World Cup where they finished tied for 13th place.

=== Senior career ===
In December 1999, Good played in the European Senior Tour qualifying school in Turkey. He finished 6th, to earn a place on the tour for 2000. He finished tied for 6th in his first event, the Beko Classic, had 6 other top-10 finishes during the year, and finished the season 25th in the Order of Merit. He had considerable success on the tour from 2001 to 2004 finishing 4th, 15th, 10th and 6th in the Order of Merit in those four seasons. In those four years, he won twice, the 2001 Legends in Golf and the 2003 Tunisian Seniors Open, was runner-up 6 times and had 27 other top-10 finishes, earning over €600,000. He continued playing on the tour from 2005 to 2009 but with less success, having a further 6 top-10 finishes in those five seasons. He also had considerable success as a senior in Australian events.

== Professional wins (8) ==
=== PGA Tour of Australasia wins (2) ===
No.	Date	Tournament	Winning score	Margin of victory	Runners-up
1	1 Feb 1976	Tasmanian Open	−5 (73-70-68-72=283)	Playoff	(Australia) Stewart Ginn, (Australia) Brian Jones, (Australia) Ian Stanley
2	11 Apr 1976	Royal Fremantle Open	−9 (69-69-72-69=279)	5 strokes	(Australia) Terry Gale, (Australia) Kel Nagle, (Australia) Graham Johnson, (Australia) Randall Vines

PGA Tour of Australasia playoff record (1–0)

No.	Year	Tournament	Opponents	Result
1	1976	Tasmanian Open	(Australia) Stewart Ginn, (Australia) Brian Jones, (Australia) Ian Stanley	Won with birdie on fifth extra hole Ginn and Stanley eliminated by par on first hole

=== New Zealand Golf Circuit wins (1) ===
No.	Date	Tournament	Winning score	Margin of victory	Runner-up
1	23 Oct 1977	Air New Zealand Shell Open	−2 (69-68-71-70=278)	Playoff	(Australia) Bill Dunk

New Zealand Golf Circuit playoff record (1–0)

No.	Year	Tournament	Opponent	Result
1	1977	Air New Zealand Shell Open	(Australia) Bill Dunk	Won with par on first extra hole

=== European Seniors Tour wins (2) ===
No.	Date	Tournament	Winning score	Margin of victory	Runner-up
1	26 Aug 2001	Legends in Golf	−9 (69-66-69=204)	Playoff	(United States) Jerry Bruner
2	4 Oct 2003	Tunisian Seniors Open	−18 (66-68-64=198)	5 strokes	(Chile) Guillermo Encina

European Seniors Tour playoff record (1–1)

No.	Year	Tournament	Opponent	Result
1	2001	Bad Ragaz PGA Seniors Open	(Scotland) David Huish	Lost to birdie on first extra hole
2	2001	Legends in Golf	(United States) Jerry Bruner	Won with birdie on first extra hole

=== PGA of Australia Legends Tour wins (3) ===
note: this list is probably incomplete

- 2016 "The Jack Harris & Brian Twite" Victorian PGA Seniors Foursomes Championship (with Lucien Tickler)
- 2017 Mainpower Legends Pro Am with Lamb & Hayward (with Colin Hunt), "The Jack Harris & Brian Twite" Victorian PGA Seniors Foursomes Championship (with Lucien Tickler)

== Results in major championships ==
Tournament	1973	1974	1975	1976	1977	1978
The Open Championship	T18					T52

Note: Good only played in The Open Championship.

Did not play

"T" = tied

== Team appearances ==
Amateur

- Australian Men's Interstate Teams Matches (representing Tasmania): 1966, 1967, 1968 (winners), 1969

Professional

- World Cup (representing Australia): 1977
