= Katsuyoshi Tomori =

Japanese professional golfer

Katsuyoshi Tomori 友利勝良
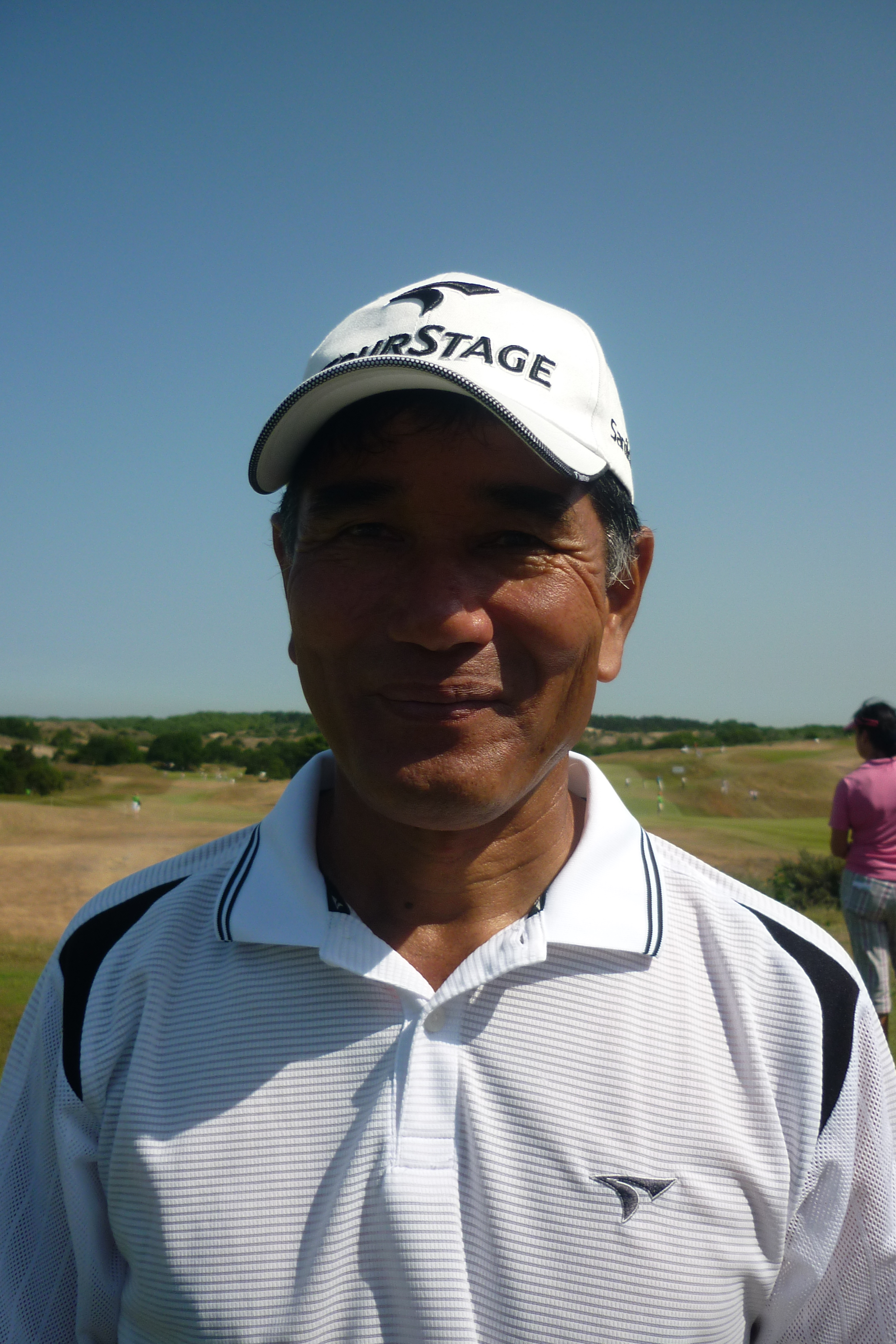

Personal information
- Nationality: Japan
- Born: 25 October 1954 (age 72) Miyakojima, Okinawa, Japan
- Height: 1.74 m (5 ft 9 in)
- Weight: 73 kg (161 lb; 11.5 st)

Career
- Sport: Golf
- Turned professional: 1982
- Current tours: European Seniors Tour; Japan PGA Senior Tour
- Former tours: Japan Golf Tour; European Tour
- Professional wins: 12
- Highest ranking: 93 (5 May 1996)

Number of wins by tour
- Japan Golf Tour: 7
- European Senior Tour: 1
- Other: 4

Best results in major championships
- Masters Tournament: DNP
- PGA Championship: DNP
- U.S. Open: DNP
- The Open Championship: T24: 1995

Katsuyoshi Tomori (友利 勝良, Tomori Katsuyoshi; born 25 October 1954) is a Japanese professional golfer.

== Career ==
Tomori was born in Okinawa Prefecture. He turned professional in 1982. His seven tournament wins on the Japan Golf Tour include the 1994 Mitsubishi Galant Tournament and the 1995 Japan PGA Match-Play Championship Promise Cup.

In 1996, Tomori became the first Japanese professional to enter the European Tour Qualifying School. He was successful and played in Europe for three seasons, making the top 80 on the Order of Merit each time, with a best Order of Merit placing of 47th in 1998. After the 2000 season, he returned to the Japan Golf Tour.

Tomori now plays in senior tournaments and in 2006 he became the fourth Japanese golfer to win a tournament on the European Seniors Tour when he won the Scandinavian Senior Open.

== Professional wins (12) ==
=== Japan Golf Tour wins (7) ===
No.	Date	Tournament	Winning score	Margin of victory	Runner(s)-up
1	6 Sep 1987	Kyusyu Open	E (70-73-75-70=288)	1 stroke	(Japan) Kosei Sakai
2	4 Sep 1988	Kyusyu Open (2)	−5 (71-70-70-72=283)	3 strokes	(Japan) Kiyotaka Oie (a)
3	30 Jul 1989	NST Niigata Open	E (71-70-76-71=288)	1 stroke	(Japan) Tomohiro Maruyama
4	2 Sep 1990	Kyusyu Open (3)	−11 (69-69-67-72=277)	6 strokes	(Japan) Keiji Teshima, (Japan) Kinpachi Yoshimura
5	29 May 1994	Mitsubishi Galant Tournament	−11 (69-66-70=205) (Note: Shortened to 54 holes due to weather.)	6 strokes	(Japan) Tsuneyuki Nakajima
6	3 Sep 1995	Japan PGA Match-Play Championship Promise Cup	2 and 1		(Japan) Shigeki Maruyama
7	8 Jun 2003	JCB Classic Sendai	−20 (64-68-64-68=264)	2 strokes	(Japan) Yūsaku Miyazato

Japan Golf Tour playoff record (0–3)

No.	Year	Tournament	Opponent	Result
1	1989	Kyusyu Open	(Japan) Shinji Kuraoka	
2	2001	Sun Chlorella Classic	(Japan) Hiroyuki Fujita	Lost to birdie on first extra hole
3	2006	Japan PGA Championship	(Japan) Tomohiro Kondo	Lost to par on first extra hole

=== Japan Challenge Tour wins (1) ===
- 1986 Mito Green Open

=== Other wins (1) ===
- 1993 Kyusyu Open

=== European Seniors Tour wins (1) ===
No.	Date	Tournament	Winning score	Margin of victory	Runners-up
1	19 Aug 2006	Scandinavian Senior Open	−14 (66-67-66=199)	2 strokes	(Republic of Ireland) Eamonn Darcy, (Spain) José Rivero

=== Japan PGA Senior Tour wins (2) ===
- 2005 Aderans Wellness Open
- 2007 PGA Handa Cup Philanthropy Senior Tournament

== Results in major championships ==
Tournament	1993	1994	1995	1996	1997	1998	1999	2000	2001	2002	2003
The Open Championship	CUT	T51	T24			T44	T49	CUT			69

Note: Tomori only played in The Open Championship.

Did not play

CUT = missed the half-way cut
"T" = tied

== Team appearances ==
- World Cup (representing Japan): 1990, 1993
- Alfred Dunhill Cup (representing Japan): 1999
