= John Chillas =

Scottish golfer

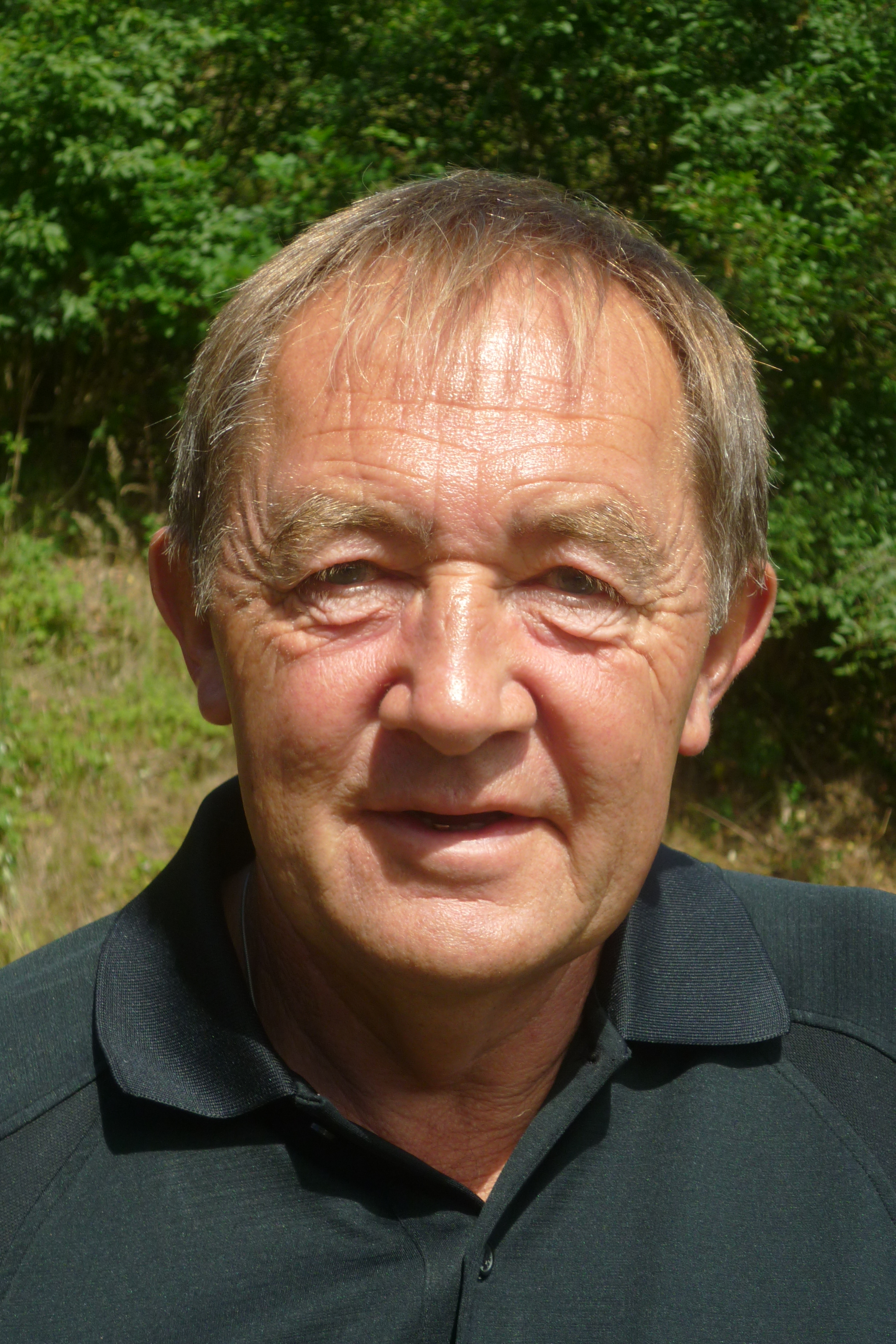

Personal information
- Full name: John Stalker Chillas
- Nationality: Scotland
- Born: 31 July 1951 (age 75) Aberdeen, Scotland
- Height: 1.77 m (5 ft 10 in)
- Weight: 86 kg (190 lb; 13.5 st)

Career
- Sport: Golf
- Turned professional: 1971
- Current tour: European Senior Tour
- Former tour: European Tour
- Professional wins: 6

Number of wins by tour
- European Senior Tour: 3
- Other: 3

Best results in major championships
- Masters Tournament: DNP
- PGA Championship: DNP
- U.S. Open: DNP
- The Open Championship: T52: 1984

John Stalker Chillas (born 31 July 1951) is a Scottish professional golfer. He has also won three times on the European Seniors Tour.

== Career ==
During his regular career, he won the Scottish PGA Championship twice: in 1976 and 2001. He also tied for 52nd place in the 1984 Open Championship.

His best season on the European Senior Tour was 2004. In addition to winning the end-of-season Estoril Seniors Tour Championship, he was runner-up five times and third on two other occasions. From late August to late September he was runner-up in four consecutive tournaments: the Charles Church Scottish Seniors Open, the Bovis Lend Lease European Senior Masters, The Daily Telegraph Turismo Andaluz European Seniors Match Play Championship, and the ADT English Seniors Open. He finished the season 3rd in the Order of Merit. In 2005, he finished in second place at the Australian PGA Seniors Championship, the top senior tournament in Australia, only behind American Tom Purtzer.

== Professional wins (6) ==
=== Regular wins (3) ===
- 1976 Scottish Professional Championship
- 1986 Dumfries Octocentenary Classic
- 2001 Scottish PGA Championship

=== European Seniors Tour wins (3) ===
Legend
Tour Championships (1)
Other European Seniors Tour (2)

No.	Date	Tournament	Winning score	Margin of victory	Runner-up
1	17 Aug 2003	Travis Perkins Senior Masters	−7 (70-70-69=209)	1 stroke	(Republic of Ireland) Eamonn Darcy
2	24 Oct 2004	Estoril Seniors Tour Championship	−6 (69-70-68=207)	2 strokes	(Australia) David Good
3	22 Sep 2007	Scandinavian Senior Open	−8 (70-67-68=205)	Playoff	(England) Glenn Ralph

European Seniors Tour playoff record (1–0)

No.	Year	Tournament	Opponent	Result
1	2007	Scandinavian Senior Open	(England) Glenn Ralph	Won with par on fourth extra hole

== Team appearances ==
- PGA Cup (representing Great Britain and Ireland/Europe): 1982, 1983 (winners), 1984 (winners), 1988, 1992
- UBS Cup (representing the Rest of the World): 2004
