= Jerry Bruner =

American professional golfer (born 1947)

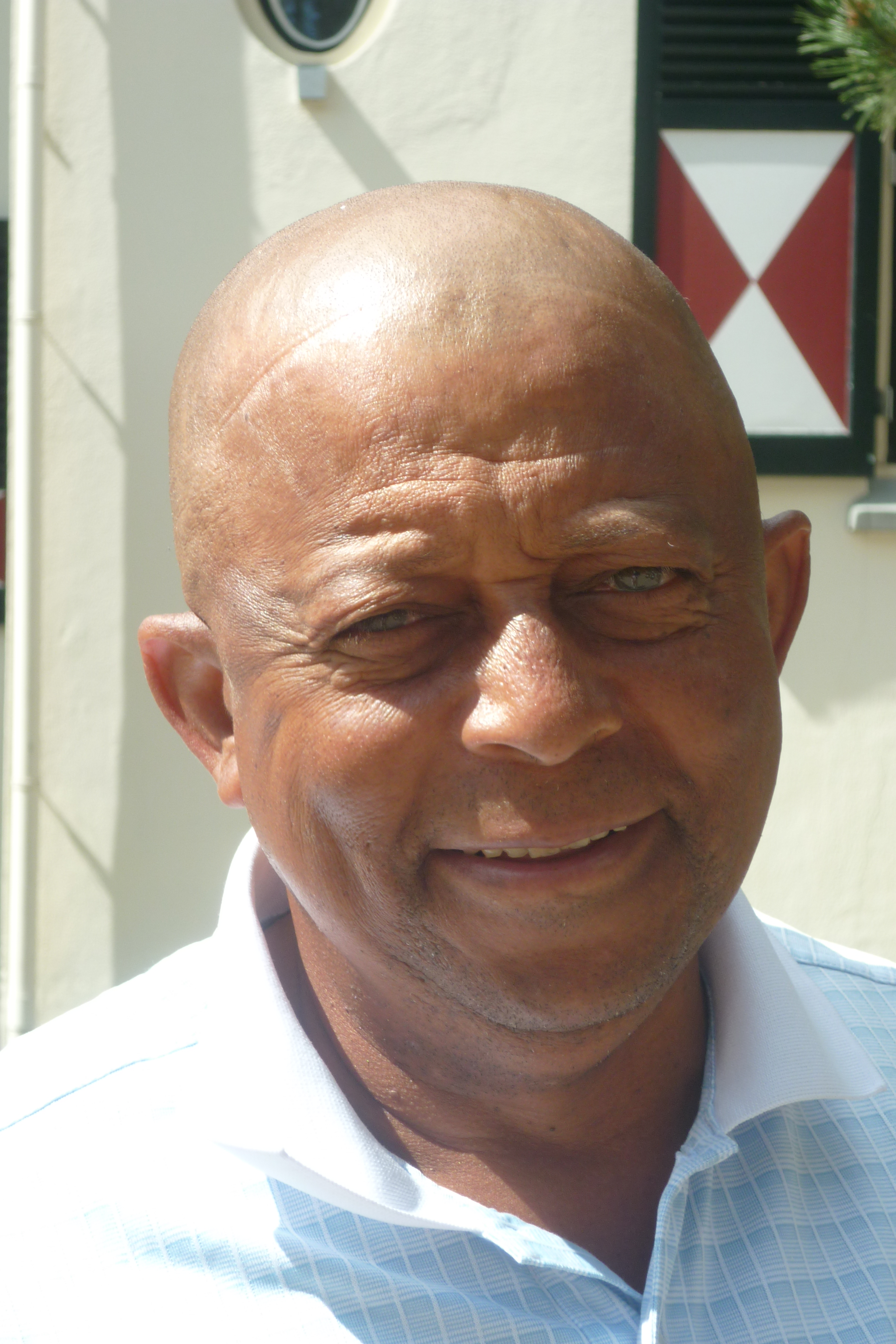

Personal information
- Full name: Jeremiah Bruner
- Nationality: United States
- Born: April 1, 1947 (age 79) Greenville, Alabama, U.S.
- Height: 1.70 m (5 ft 7 in)
- Weight: 74 kg (163 lb; 11.7 st)

Career
- Sport: Golf
- Turned professional: 1982
- Current tour: European Senior Tour
- Professional wins: 3

Number of wins by tour
- European Senior Tour: 3

Achievements and awards
- European Seniors Tour Rookie of the Year: 1999

Jeremiah "Jerry" Bruner (born April 1, 1947) is an American professional golfer who won three times on the European Seniors Tour.

Bruner was inducted into the National Black Golf Hall of Fame in May 2016.

== Professional wins (3) ==
=== European Seniors Tour wins (3) ===
Legend
Tour Championships (1)
Other European Seniors Tour (2)

No.	Date	Tournament	Winning score	Margin of victory	Runner(s)-up
1	Nov 4, 2001	European Seniors Tour Championship	−6 (73-69-68=210)	1 stroke	(Australia) David Good
2	Jun 22, 2003	De Vere Northumberland Seniors Classic	−14 (68-65-69=202)	4 strokes	(Scotland) John Chillas
3	Oct 9, 2005	Algarve Seniors Open of Portugal	−11 (66-68-71=205)	1 stroke	(Northern Ireland) Eddie Polland, (Spain) José Rivero, (Scotland) Sam Torrance

European Seniors Tour playoff record (0–2)

No.	Year	Tournament	Opponent(s)	Result
1	2001	Legends in Golf	(Australia) David Good	Lost to birdie on first extra hole
2	2006	AIB Irish Seniors Open	(Chile) Guillermo Encina, (Australia) Stewart Ginn, (Scotland) Sam Torrance	Torrance won with eagle on second extra hole Encina and Ginn eliminated by birdie on first hole

== Team appearances ==
- Praia d'El Rey European Cup: 1999
