= Priscillo Diniz =

Brazilian professional golfer

Personal information
- Full name: Jose Priscillo G. Diniz
- Nationality: Brazil
- Born: 12 December 1948 (age 77) São Paulo, Brazil
- Height: 5 ft 11 in (1.80 m)
- Spouse: Regina (m. 1986)

Career
- Sport: Golf
- Turned professional: 1977
- Former tours: European Tour; European Seniors Tour
- Professional wins: 12

Number of wins by tour
- European Senior Tour: 2
- Other: 10

Best results in major championships
- Masters Tournament: CUT: 1976
- PGA Championship: DNP
- U.S. Open: DNP
- The Open Championship: DNP

Achievements and awards
- European Seniors Tour Rookie of the Year: 2000

Jose Priscillo G. Diniz (born 12 December 1948) is a Brazilian professional golfer.

== Early life and amateur career ==
Diniz was born in São Paulo. He comes from a family which boasts several other professional golfers, including his grandfather.

Early in his career, he worked as a lawyer. As an amateur, he was twice Brazilian Amateur champion and he also won the 1975 South American Amateur Championship.

== Professional career ==
At the advanced age of 28, Diniz turned professional. In his regular career, Diniz won several titles on the South American circuit. He played on the European Tour in 1977 and 1978 but with little success.

In 2000, he was the Rookie of the Year on the European Seniors Tour and finished sixth on that tour's Order of Merit. He has won two European Seniors Tour events, the 2000 The Daily Telegraph European Seniors Match Play Championship and the 2001 Royal Westmoreland Barbados Open.

== Amateur wins ==
- 1974 Brazilian Amateur Championship
- 1975 South American Amateur Championship, Brazilian Amateur Championship
- 1976 Simon Bolivar Cup (Venezuela)

== Professional wins (12) ==
=== South American wins (10) ===
- 1975 Brazil Open (as an amateur)
- 1977 Uruguay Open
- 1978 Brazil PGA Championship, Medellin Open (Colombia)
- 1979 Brazil PGA Championship
- 1985 Peru Open
- 1986 Peru Open
- 1991 Brazilian Masters
- 1992 Brazilian Masters, Johnnie Walker Classic (Brazil)

=== European Seniors Tour wins (2) ===
No.	Date	Tournament	Winning score	Margin of victory	Runner-up
1	13 Jul 2000	The Daily Telegraph European Seniors Match Play Championship	3 and 2		(Australia) Ian Stanley
2	31 Mar 2001	Royal Westmoreland Barbados Open	−16 (64-67-69=200)	3 strokes	(England) David Creamer

== Team appearances ==
Amateur

- Eisenhower Trophy (representing Brazil): 1974, 1976

Professional

- World Cup (representing Brazil): 1983, 1984, 1985, 1987, 1988
- Dunhill Cup (representing Brazil): 1988
