= DGM Barbados Open =

Golf tournament

Barbados Legends
Tournament information
- Location: Saint James, Barbados
- Established: 2000
- Course: Apes Hill Barbados
- Par: 72
- Length: 6,809 yards (6,226 m)
- Tour: European Senior Tour
- Format: Stroke play
- Prize fund: US$600,000
- Month played: May

Tournament record score
- Aggregate: 197 Greg Owen (2026)
- To par: −16 Priscillo Diniz (2001) −16 Greg Owen (2026)

Current champion
- (England) Greg Owen

Final champion
- Location in Barbados

The Barbados Legends is a senior (over 50s) men's professional golf tournament played on the Caribbean island state of Barbados, played annually from 2000 to 2009. It was an early season event on the European Senior Tour and generally the only regular event on the tour that took place in the Americas. It was hosted by the Royal Westmoreland Golf Club, Saint James, Barbados.

== Winners ==
Year	Winner	Score	To par	Margin of victory	Runner(s)-up
Barbados Legends
2026	(England) Greg Owen	197	−16	2 strokes	(Australia) Scott Hend
2025	(Australia) Scott Hend	202	−11	2 strokes	(England) Greg Owen
2024	(England) Peter Baker	203	−10	Playoff	(Australia) Scott Hend
2010–2023: No tournament
DGM Barbados Open
2009	(Scotland) Sam Torrance	202	−14	4 strokes	(Paraguay) Ángel Franco
2008	(Scotland) Bill Longmuir	206	−10	3 strokes	(England) Bob Cameron
2007	(Scotland) Gordon J. Brand	208	−8	1 stroke	(United States) Doug Johnson
2006	(Spain) José Rivero	207	−9	Playoff	(England) David J. Russell
2005	(Republic of Ireland) Denis O'Sullivan	206	−10	3 strokes	(United States) John Grace
2004	(South Africa) Gavan Levenson	204	−12	2 strokes	(England) Denis Durnian (England) Carl Mason
Royal Westmoreland Barbados Open
2003	(Australia) Terry Gale	206	−10	6 strokes	(United States) Jerry Bruner (Australia) Brian Jones
2002	(England) Peter Townsend	212	−4	1 stroke	(Chile) Guillermo Encina
2001	(Brazil) Priscillo Diniz	200	−16	3 strokes	(England) David Creamer
2000	(England) Tommy Horton	208	−8	2 strokes	(United States) Jerry Bruner
