= Terry Kendall =

New Zealand professional golfer

Personal information
- Nationality: New Zealand
- Born: 11 October 1947 New Zealand
- Died: 15 November 2002 (aged 55) Mount Albert, Auckland, New Zealand
- Spouse: Liz
- Children: 2

Career
- Sport: Golf
- Turned professional: 1969
- Former tours: PGA Tour of Australasia; European Seniors Tour
- Professional wins: 8

Number of wins by tour
- PGA Tour of Australasia: 1
- Other: 7

Terry Kendall (11 October 1947 – 15 November 2002) was a professional golfer from New Zealand.

== Career ==
Kendall's first major success was at the 1969 New Zealand PGA Championship at the Mount Maunganai Golf Course. He shot a course record 63 (−10) in the second round to take the lead. Although he did not break 70 on the weekend, he made a "pressure putt" on the final hole to defeat Bob Charles and John Lister by one. In September, he was selected to represent New Zealand, together with John Lister, at the World Cup in Singapore. In October, he recorded a high result at the West End Tournament in South Australia. At the beginning of the tournament, however, he opened poorly with a 73 (+3). The mediocre play continued at the beginning of the second round; Kendall shot a front nine 36 followed by a three-putt on the 10th and then "missed an easy chance for a birdie" at the 11th. However, he "provided a sensation" with three consecutive birdies starting at the 12th hole. He birdied the 17th as well to finish with a back nine 31 and move into contention. He went on to shoot another 67 in the final round to finish solo runner-up, five behind champion Guy Wolstenholme. The following week, Kendall played the World Cup in Singapore. He and Lister finished 19th among 45 teams.

In February 1970, he played the Tasmanian Open. Right before the tournament began he played the $750 Golden Crumpet Purse at Kingston Beach Golf Course. He shot a 68 (−5), tying David Graham for second place, two behind champion Tony Mangan. At the tournament proper, he was one back of Graham and Alan Murray entering the final round. He played excellently over the front nine and by the 11th hole had a four stroke lead. He got "greedy" on the back nine, however, hitting a number of overly ambitious shots. He finished with a 72 and lost to Graham by one. The following month, he contended for the Singapore Open. After the third round, he was at 209 (−4), one back of the lead. He finished at 279 (−5) for solo fourth, three back of champion Hsieh Yung-yo. In August, he played the Queensland Open in Brisbane, Australia. Kendall was well behind 54-hole leader Bill Dunk at the beginning of the final round but birdied a number of holes in the middle of the round to get close. On the 14th hole, he took the lead for the first time after a bogey-birdie exchange with Dunk. Kendall fell into a tie after a bogey on 16 but birdied the last for a one-stroke win over Dunk and Glen McCully. It was his first win in Australia. In November 1970, he played the Caltex Tournament at Paraparamu Beach Golf Club in New Zealand. He opened with a 70 (−1) to position himself in third place, two back of leader Bobby Cole and one back of Maurice Bembridge. He continued to play well and took a three shot lead into the final round. However, he played poorly in the final round and was over par after 17 holes. He fell behind playing partner Bembridge. However, he made an eagle 3 on the last hole to equal Bembridge, who could only make birdie. There were no playoffs in the tournament so the event ended in a tie.

In 1971, Kendall had success across Asia, North America, and the Australasian region. In March 1971, he played the Malaysian Open. Kendall was out of contention starting the final day but shot a fourth round 66 (−6) to move up into the top-10. In addition to the 8th place prize money, he earned $900 for his final round performance, the low round of the day. In May 1971, he played the Japan Airlines Open. He opened with the joint lead after a first round 69 (−3). He ultimately finished in a tie for 5th, five back of David Graham. Later in the year, he won the Atlantic Open on the Peter Jackson Tour in Canada. In October 1971, he played the Australian PGA Championship at Surfers Paradise Golf Club. He opened with a course record 65 to take the lead. He followed with a "fine" second round 69 to remain in contention, one back of Walter Godfrey. In the third round, he shot an even-par 70 to remain in second, this time three back of Bill Dunk. In late December 1971, he began play at the Spalding Masters in New Zealand. Kendall shot a second round 66 to tie Guy Wolstenholme and Bob Charles for the lead at 135. One round was cancelled due to poor weather; the third round would be the final round. Kendall did not keep up with the co-leaders, shooting a final round 71 (+1) to finish solo third, six back of champion Charles and four back of runner-up Wolstenholme.

In 1972, Kendall continued with worldwide success. In April, he played the Chunichi Crowns in Japan. He opened with consecutive rounds of 66 (−4) to take a one stroke lead over Peter Thomson. In the third round, however, he had a "disastrous" 73 (+3) to fall into second place, five behind Thomson. He came back with a final round 67 (−3) to finish solo runner-up, six behind Thomson. In June, he played the World Friendship in Japan. At the midway point, he took a one stroke lead, at 138 (−6), over Tōru Nakamura after a second round 67 (−5). He shot a third round 69 to maintain a one shot lead, this time over Hsieh Yung-yo. However, he shot over par the last day, finishing one behind Hsieh at 280 (−8). That summer, he also won the Saskatchewan Open on the Peter Jackson Tour in Canada. Kendall returned to Australia for the 1972–73 season. In October, he played the North Coast Open at Coffs Harbour, Australia. Kendall showed "mixed form" the first three days, shooting over par twice, and was at even-par for the tournament. He was four strokes behind leader Tony Mangan. During the final round Kendall made "three successive birdies" early, however, to get close and then birdied the 9th for a front nine 32 (−4). He birdied three more holes early in the back nine to move to seven-under for the day. He bogeyed the 15th but parred in for a 66 (−6). Competitor Bill Dunk was also several under-par for the day and had a chance to win. However, he had a penalty stroke on the 17th and barely missed a putt on the 18th to tie. Kendall defeated Dunk by one shot. In November, he led the way after the first round of the Qantas Australian Open, shooting a course record 68 (−4) in "cold winds" at the Kooyonga Golf Club to lead by two shots. He then shot rounds of 74 and 77 to fall out of contention. However, he finished with a 70 (−2) to finish in a tie for eighth. A month later, he recorded a third place showing in his home country at the Otago Charity Classic, two out of a Johnny Miller/Lu Liang-Huan playoff. In December 1972, he played the City of Auckland Classic. He opened with a 69 (−2) putting him one back of the lead held. He followed with a 72 (+1) but maintained third place. He shot a third round 74 (+3) to fall several behind but finished with a 70 (−1) to finish T-6. During this era, leading up to golf tournaments, Kendall was often considered by newspaper writers to be among the favorites.

In 1973, he recorded several highlights. In March, he finished in a tie for sixth at the Indian Open. In October, Kendall seriously competed for the South Australian Open. He started the final round in second place two shots back of Ted Ball. In the "high winds" at The Grange during the final round, Ball played poorly and Kendall took the lead by the 14th hole. Kendall however bogeyed the next two holes while Ball made a "magnificent" birdie on the 15th to regain the lead. Kendall birdied the "tough" 17th to get back in it but bogeyed the 18th. Ball parred in after 15 and won by one. Despite the disappointing final stretch, Kendall finished solo runner-up, one ahead of fellow New Zealander Walter Godfrey. This excellent play through the early 1970s would help him qualify to represent New Zealand for a second time at the 1973 World Cup in Marbella, Spain. (Kendall, however, withdrew from the tournament and was replaced by Simon Owen.) In late December, he began played the Hibiscus Coast Classic at the Peninsular Golf Course. Kendall opened with a 65 (−7) to break the course record. He was tied for the lead with Mark Tapper. Kendall fell behind in the second round but Tapper dropped shots early in the final round to fall into a tie. Kendall, meanwhile, made a 12 foot birdie putt on the 17th hole to secure the win. With his 69, he finished at 204 (−12) and defeated Tapper by two. After the tournament, however, Kendall announced that he would retire as a touring professional. "Living out of a suitcase is a heck of a life," he stated. Kendall intended to work as a club professional.

In the late 1970s, Kendall came out of retirement. In October 1976, he once again received media attention for his play at the Australian Open. He opened the tournament with three birdies, the best of anyone in the field. He finished the first round with a 72 (E), one behind leader Curtis Strange, tied with Jack Nicklaus and Maurice Bembridge for second place. At the difficult Australian Golf Club course, he also managed to match par on Friday and Sunday and finished in a tie for fourth. In April 1977, he finished two behind Filipino Ben Arda at Japan's Dunlop International Open, joint runner-up with Tsuneyuki Nakajima. The following year, in September 1978, Kendall shot a third round 68 (−4) to tie for the overnight lead (216, E) at the South Seas Classic. In the final round, he shot 74 to finish T-4, two back. During this era, Kendall was associated with Akarana Golf Club in Auckland, New Zealand.

1979 would be his final great year. In February, he seriously contended at the Tasmanian Open. He was two behind leader Marty Bohen entering the final round. Though Bohen had an up and down day Kendall failed to capitalize, shooting a 72 (+2) to finish four back. He still finished solo second, four ahead of the remainder of the field. In April, he played the Way Channel 9 Celebration Open at Mount Lawley Golf Course in Western Australia. He took lead after the second round. He held a five stroke lead after the third round at 209 (−7). Kendall was unchallenged in the final round, shooting a 71 (−1), "coasting" to a five shot win. This was his only official win on the PGA Tour of Australasia. In October 1979, after a first round 70, he was near the lead at the Garden State Victorian PGA Championship. He ultimately finished in a tie for fourth with Greg Norman, four out of a playoff. Two weeks later, he opened with a 68 at the West Lakes Classic to take the joint lead. He finished in a tie for eighth. During this time, he served as a mentor for future PGA Tour pro Frank Nobilo while he was still an amateur.

The early 1980s were the final years Kendall received media attention for his work as a touring professional. In January 1980, he took the first and second round lead at the Traralgon Classic. He ultimately settled for joint third place. In October 1980, he shot a 69 to place himself in a tie for fifth at the New South Wales Open after the opening round. He ultimately finished in a tie for sixth at 287 (+3). In 1984, burnt out from the grind of international golf, he retired as a touring professional. He continued to work in the golf industry, however, as a club professional.

Shortly after turning 50, he briefly renewed his touring professional career, playing seven events on European Seniors Tour. He did not have many highlights, however, and quickly stopped playing after the 1999 season.

According to the New Zealand Herald, he won at least 10 global tournaments.

== Personal life ==
Kendall was married and had two daughters. Late in life, he lived in St. Lukes, a neighborhood within Mount Albert, an inner suburb of Auckland.

== Death ==
On 15 November 2002, Kendall was in his parked car near his apartment in St. Lukes. Flames abruptly swept his car. Witnesses were able to pull Kendall out of his car while he was still alive. Paramedics arrived shortly later and Kendall was taken to Middlemore Hospital. He died later at the hospital. He was 55 years old. It was labeled a "suspicious death" but no evidence of a crime was discovered.

== Professional wins (8) ==
=== PGA Tour of Australia wins (1) ===
No.	Date	Tournament	Winning score	Margin of victory	Runners-up
1	1 Apr 1979	WAY Channel 9 Celebration Open	−8 (70-69-70-71=280)	5 strokes	(Australia) Colin Bishop, (Australia) Terry Gale

=== New Zealand Golf Circuit wins (2) ===
No.	Date	Tournament	Winning score	Margin of victory	Runner(s)-up
1	8 Jan 1969	Stars Travel New Zealand PGA Championship	−18 (69-63-70-72=274)	1 stroke	(New Zealand) Bob Charles, (New Zealand) John Lister
2	21 Nov 1970	Caltex Tournament	+2 (70-73-69-74=286)	Shared title with (England) Maurice Bembridge	

New Zealand Golf Circuit playoff record (0–1)

No.	Year	Tournament	Opponents	Result
1	1969	Vonnel International	(Australia) Bill Dunk, (New Zealand) John Lister, (Australia) Randall Vines	Lister won with birdie on second extra hole Kendall and Vines eliminated by par on first hole

=== Peter Jackson Tour wins (2) ===
- 1971 Atlantic Open
- 1972 Saskatchewan Open

=== Other wins (3) ===
- 1970 Queensland Open
- 1972 North Coast Open
- 1973 Hibiscus Coast Classic

== Team appearances ==
- World Cup (representing New Zealand): 1969
