= Ray Hore =

Australian professional golfer (born 1954)

Personal information
- Nationality: Australia
- Born: 9 June 1954 (age 72)

Career
- Sport: Golf
- Turned professional: 1974
- Former tour: PGA Tour of Australasia
- Professional wins: 2

Number of wins by tour
- PGA Tour of Australasia: 2

Ray Hore (born 9 June 1954) is an Australian professional golfer.

== Early life ==
Hore is from Cobbitty, New South Wales, a rural hamlet near Camden on the outskirts of Sydney. As a youth he completed his golfing apprenticeship at Royal Sydney Golf Club.

== Golf career ==
Hore first received media attention at the 1974 South Australian Open. In the second round, he broke the course record at Glenelg Golf Club with a 66 (−6). He received A$2,000 for breaking the course record and a case of the club's red wine. During the third round, played in "icy winds and rain," Hore came back to the field slightly with a 74 (+2). He was tied for the lead with David Galloway and Randall Vines at 215 (−1). In the final round, all 54-hole leaders played one-over-par golf on the front nine. All remained joint leaders. Vines and Galloway then dropped shots early on the back nine while Hore birdied the 11th. Hore now led by two. Galloway then made a "magnificent" eagle on the 13th to briefly tie but Hore, playing behind, soon birdied to regain the lead. On the 14th hole, however, Hore hit his drive into the woods and made bogey. Playing partner Vines also bogeyed, however, as did Galloway ahead. Hore still held the lead. On the par-4 15th, Hore hit a "pinsplitting" approach and made the birdie putt to expand his lead. On the 18th tee, he had a two stroke lead over Galloway and three over Vines. Hore "betrayed his first sign of strain" when his second shot landed in a grove of trees near the practice area. His third shot then went over the green. Vines, meanwhile, made birdie to finish at 289 (+1) with Galloway. Hore, however, managed to chip on and make bogey for a one stroke win. It was his first professional win.

In the late 1970s and early 1980s, Hore received media attention, especially for his performances at the Royal Fremantle Open. At the 1977 Fremantle event he was at 209 (−7) after three rounds. Hore came home with a 71 (−1) to finish at 280 to defeat David Galloway by two strokes. He was described by the Canberra Times as "one of the most promising young players on the Australian golf scene" after the event. In September 1978, Hore played well at the Wyong Open held in Wyong, New South Wales. He was one back of Barry Burgess heading into the final day at 143. However, "heavy rain" eliminated Friday's play. Hore finished joint runner-up with Ted Ball at the weather-truncated, two round event. The following year Hore again played well at the Royal Fremantle Open. He was at 212 (−4), three shots behind leader Terry Gale, after three rounds. He then "stormed home" with a final round 69 (−3) to finish one behind Gale. In 1980, he recorded his second consecutive runner-up at the event. After two rounds he held the joint lead with Barry Vivian. He shot a third round 75 (+3) to fall several shots behind. However, he shot a final round 70 (−2), the round of the day, to finish in solo second, two behind champion Chris Tickner.

Hore did not receive much attention for his career as a touring professional thereafter. As a senior, however, he received some attention for his play for Bankstown Golf Cub. In 2015, Hore participated in a New South Wales Master Pennant event representing Bankstown. The event was held at Twin Creeks Golf Club. His team's 227 total defeated the Wyong's team total by one stroke. As of 2019, Hore was still a member at Bankstown.

== Personal life ==
Hore has a sister named Rina Hore. She is a former cricket player. She was the first woman ever elected to New South Wales Cricket. She was also the vice president of Australian Women's Cricket. She was the Executive Director of the Bradman Museum until February 2022, the International Cricket Hall of Fame.

== Professional wins (2) ==
=== PGA Tour of Australia wins (2) ===
- 1974 South Australian Open
- 1977 Royal Fremantle Open
