= Royal Fremantle Open =

Golf tournament held in Fremantle, Western Australia

Tournament information
- Location: Fremantle, Western Australia
- Course: Royal Fremantle Golf Club
- Format: Stroke play

Location map
- Location in Australia Location in Western Australia

The Royal Fremantle Open was an Australian golf tournament. The event was held at Royal Fremantle Golf Club in Fremantle, Western Australia.

== History ==
Western Australian Terry Gale had much success at the event, winning it in 1979 and finishing runner-up two years later. The professional Ray Hore also had much success at the event, posting one win and two runner-ups.

Among the most notable performances was in 1981. Royal Fremantle amateur Glenn Carbon, playing at a 2 handicap, holed a 50 metre pitch at the last for an eagle to defeat Terry Gale by a stroke.

== Winners ==
Year	Winner	Score	To par	Margin of victory	Runner(s)-up	Purse (A$)	Ref.
1976	David Good	279	−9	5 strokes	Terry Gale; Graham Johnson; Kel Nagle; Randall Vines	6,000	
1977	Ray Hore	280	−8	2 strokes	David Galloway	10,000	
1978	Peter Headland	278	−10	2 strokes	Mike Ferguson; Vaughan Somers	10,000	
1979	Terry Gale	280	−8	1 stroke	Ray Hore	15,000	
1980	Chris Tickner	287	−1	1 stroke	Ray Hore	15,000	
1981	Glenn Carbon (a)	282	−6	1 stroke	Terry Gale	10,000	
1982	Mike Cahill					6,000	
