= European Seniors Match Play Championship =

The Daily Telegraph Turismo Andaluz European Seniors Match Play Championship
Tournament information
- Location: Málaga, Spain
- Established: 2000
- Course: Flamingos Golf Club
- Par: 72
- Length: 6,409 yards (5,860 m)
- Tour: European Senior Tour
- Format: Stroke play
- Prize fund: £100,000
- Month played: September
- Final year: 2004

Tournament record score
- Score: 3 and 2 Priscillo Diniz (2000); 3 and 2 Carl Mason (2004)

Final champion
- (England) Carl Mason
- Location in Spain Location in Andalusia

The European Seniors Match Play Championship was a senior (over 50s) men's professional match play golf tournament played on the European Seniors Tour from 2000 to 2004. In 2000 and 2001 it was held at Penina Golf, Portimão, on the Algarve, Portugal, while from 2002 to 2004 it was held at Flamingos Golf, Marbella, Málaga, Spain. Prize money totalled £100,000.

The event was contested by 32 golfers and was played over four days with the first three rounds played on the opening three days and the semi-final and final played on the final day. All matches were over 18 holes with extra holes played if required to achieve a result. The winner received £16,000 with £11,000 for the losing finalist. Losing semi-finalists received £7,500, losing quarter-finalists £5,000, second round losers £2,500 and first round losers £1,125.

== Winners ==
Year	Winner	Score	Runner-up	Venue	Ref.
The Daily Telegraph Turismo Andaluz European Seniors Match Play Championship
2004	(England) Carl Mason (2)	3 and 2	(Scotland) John Chillas	Flamingos	
The Daily Telegraph Turismo Andaluz Seniors Match Play Championship
2003	(England) Carl Mason	1 up	(Republic of Ireland) Denis O'Sullivan	Flamingos	
The Daily Telegraph Sodexho Seniors Match Play Championship
2002	(Jamaica) Delroy Cambridge	1 up	(Northern Ireland) Eddie Polland	Flamingos	
SSL International Sodexho Match Play Championship
2001	(England) Jim Rhodes	2 up	(Wales) Craig Defoy	Penina	
The Daily Telegraph European Seniors Match Play Championship
2000	(Brazil) Priscillo Diniz	3 and 2	(Australia) Ian Stanley	Penina	
