= Marty Bohen =

American professional golfer (born 1942)

Personal information
- Full name: Martin Joseph Bohen
- Nationality: United States
- Born: 1942 (age 83–84) Los Angeles, California, U.S.
- Height: 6 ft 5 in (196 cm)
- Weight: 200 lb (91 kg)

Career
- Sport: Golf
- College: University of Southern California
- Turned professional: 1965
- Former tour: PGA Tour
- Professional wins: 6

Best results in major championships
- Masters Tournament: DNP
- PGA Championship: CUT: 1984
- U.S. Open: T55: 1972
- The Open Championship: DNP

Martin Joseph Bohen (born 1942) is an American professional golfer. Bohen turned professional in 1965 and tried out unsuccessfully for the PGA Tour several times during the 1960s. In the interim, he worked as a blackjack dealer in Las Vegas and honed his game with instructor Toney Penna. He eventually made it onto the PGA Tour and played on tour for three seasons. For the remainder of his career as a touring professional, he played in the Asia-Pacific region, culminating with a win at the 1979 Tasmanian Open. In 1980, Bohen took a job as assistant professional at Spook Rock Golf Club in New York state. Bohen has primarily worked as a club pro since then.

== Early life ==
Bohen was born in the spring of 1942. He was born in Los Angeles, California. He was introduced to golf at the age of 6 or 7 by his father Robert. His family moved to Las Vegas, Nevada when Bohen was 11 years old. Bohen lived in Las Vegas for the remainder of his adolescence.

== Amateur career ==
Bohen attended the University of Southern California and played on the golf team. One of his teammates was Dave Stockton. In his senior year he began to have some success at a national level. In the summer he qualified for the U.S. Amateur. Later during the academic year he reached the semifinals of the NCAA Championships. During this year, he realistically envisioned himself becoming a professional golfer for the first time. Shortly thereafter, in June 1965, he was low amateur at the Nevada Open. That year he also won the Nevada Amateur.

== Professional career ==
In November 1965, Bohen turned professional. Soon thereafter, he tried out for the PGA Tour at 1965 PGA Tour Qualifying School. At the eight-round event, Bohen missed qualifying by eight shots. The following summer, Bohen played in a number of state opens in the west. In June 1966, he won the Nevada Open with a four-under-par 212 total. He became the first golfer to win the Nevada Amateur and Nevada Open in back to back years. In August, he played the Montana Open. He was in sixth place, eight behind entering the final round. He finished in a tie for third only behind champion Al Feldman and runner-up Labron Harris. He won $725 for his efforts. During this era, he was featured in Sports Illustrated's segment, Faces in the Crowd.

Later in the year he tried out for the PGA Tour again at 1966 PGA Tour Qualifying School. The tournament was again four days, eight rounds long. Bohen began the final day in 20th place, well with the prospective cut-off. In the middle of the 7th round, however, he played poorly, ultimately shooting a 42 for the back nine. Bohen "pulled himself together" in the last round, even making birdie on the final hole, but still missed graduating by one shot. "I was destroyed," he said later in the life. In an effort to make ends meet, Bohen began work as a blackjack dealer in Las Vegas. He continued to attempt to qualify for the PGA Tour through the PGA Tour Qualifying Tournament but did not succeed. In 1969 he began working with legendary golf coach Toney Penna in hopes of turning around his performance. With the help of Penna, he qualified for and made the cut at the 1969 U.S. Open. The following year he again qualified for the U.S. Open. He did not have as much success, missing the cut by a wide margin. In November 1970, he played the Gardena Open in Gardena, California. The event included a number of current PGA Tour professionals, including Jerry Heard, Lee Elder, and Cesar Sanudo. Bohen ended the tournament with three consecutive rounds in the 60s for a tie for eighth. Later in the year, he quit his job as a blackjack dealer. Shortly thereafter, he moved to the east coast to work at Elmwood Country Club in White Plains, New York. He worked as an assistant professional.

In the early 1970s, Bohen decided to play in the Asia-Pacific region. "I wanted to keep playing," Bohen stated a few years later. "But I wasn't playing too well so I decided to try something different." During the 1971-72 year, Bohen had much success, recording a number of second place finishes. In November 1971, Bohen played the Cumberland Golf Classic in Sydney, Australia. After two rounds Bohen was at 133 (−9), three behind leader Walter Godfrey. However, Bohen provided a "tremendous challenge" to Godfrey with an eagle and two birdies out of the gate. By the 5th hole they were tied and by the 7th Bohen had a two-stroke lead. Bohen lost his solo lead, however, after a birdie-bogey exchange with Godfrey on the 8th hole. On the back nine Godfrey would slightly outplay his playing partner, holding a one-shot lead entering the last. The par-5 18th hole was played in "torrential rain." Bohen was unable to birdie and, against Godfrey's par, lost by one. Three weeks later, he had success at the Otago Charity Classic played in Dunedin, New Zealand. Bohen shot a second round 67 to tie Peter Thomson and Bob Charles for the lead at 137. Bohen shot a third round 71 (−1) and against Charles' 67 (−5) was now four behind. Bohen's putted poorly in the final round and did not put up a serious challenge against Charles. However, he "got the one putt that really mattered," an 11-foot birdie on the final hole to secure solo second by a shot over Godfrey and Peter Thomson. In March 1972, Bohen played the Malaysian Open. Bohen opened with rounds of 68 and 69 to put himself at 137 (−7), in joint third, two back of the lead held by Japan's Takashi Murakami and South Korea's Hahn Chang Sang. He shot a third round 68 (−3) and to move into a tie for the lead with Murakami and Sukree Onsham of Thailand at 206 (−10). Bohen played poorly in the final round, however, shooting a 71 (−1) to finish one shot back of champion Murakami. He finished in a tie for second with Onsham and Walter Godfrey. "I played badly today and was lucky to have hit a 71," he said after the round. "I suppose none of the leaders played really well today on account of the tension and the pressure." It was the final of three runner-up performances for the season.

As of 1972, he was an assistant professional at Leewood Country Club at Eastchester, New York. In June 1972 he played the U.S. Open at Pebble Beach Golf Links. He finished T-55. He intended to return to his job at Leewood. The head pro, George Lewis, encouraged him to continue playing tournament golf, however. Bohen took the offer and decided to work as a touring professional until the ran out of money. His status as a PGA of America club professional gave him opportunities to qualify for PGA Tour tournaments. In July, he qualified for the American Golf Classic with a 71 on Monday. In the first round of the event proper Bohen was even-par through the first 16 holes and then made birdies on the "difficult" 17th and 18th holes to shoot 68 (−2). His late run put him in a tie for fourth with, among others, Arnold Palmer, three back of Ron Cerrudo's lead. Bohen, however, faded over the final three rounds and finished in a tie for 43rd. In August he played the USI Golf Classic in Sutton, Massachusetts. He again opened well, this time with a 68 (−4) to put him one back of the lead, in joint third. He would shoot over-par the next three rounds, however, and finish at even-par, in a tie for 26th.

In 1973, Bohen played on the PGA Tour again. In June he opened with a 68 (−4) at the Kemper Open to put himself in a tie for sixth, three back of leader Tom Weiskopf. He faded over the final three rounds, however, and finished in a tie for 45th at 285 (−3). In August, he again played the USI Golf Classic. Like the previous year, he opened well, shooting a 70 (−2) to put himself in the top ten, in a tie for ninth. He repeated with a 70 in the second round to remain in the top ten. In the third round, he shot a 71 (−1) to finish in a tie for ninth place for the third straight day, four back of the lead. In the final round he was briefly in contention. However, he faltered down the stretch and finished with a four-over-par 76. His one-under-par aggregate gave him a tie for 24th. Overall, Bohen qualified for and played in 22 events, making the cut in 18 of them. At one point he made the cut in nine consecutive events. In addition to his Pleasant Valley performance, he recorded two other top 25s. This would be his best season on the PGA Tour.

In 1974, Bohen again played on the PGA Tour. In July, he played the Quad Cities Open. He opened with rounds 72 and 69 to make the cut. He finished at 279 and in a tie for 17th, eight behind champion Dave Stockton. He earned $1,400 for the performance. Overall, he made the cut in 9 of 15 events. His performance at Quad Cities, however, turned out of be his only top 25 of the year. It would be Bohen's third and final season on the PGA Tour. He only earned $3,134 for the season and did not earn enough money to maintain his card.

In 1974-75 he returned to the Asia-Pacific region during the winter. This was his fifth season overseas. Bohen played in roughly two dozen events. In March 1975, he played well at the Singapore Open. He held the joint lead with Jyoki Yokoi entering the final round. Japanese player Yutaka Suzuki, however, "burned up the course" early in the round and by the 12th hole Bohen was behind. Bohen ultimately finished at 286 (−2), two behind Suzuki, in a tie for fourth. Overall, Bohen estimated that he recorded "three or four" top five finishes for the season. He returned to the United States shortly thereafter but only played in two PGA Tour events.

In early September 1975, Bohen returned Sydney in preparation for Australia's 1975-76 season. He had much success throughout the season. In October, Bohen opened well at the West Lakes Classic with an even-par 71 to position himself in joint second, one behind Peter Crocker's lead. He shot consecutive rounds of 71 and 72 to stay close. In the final round, he briefly tied for the lead before settling for third, two out of a playoff. In January 1976, he played the New South Wales PGA Championship. In the first round Bohen scored five birdies. With his 68 (−4) he was in third place, two behind leaders Brian Jones and Peter Headland. Despite "impossible conditions" in the second round, including "winds gusting up to 40 knots," Bohen was able to shoot a 72 (E) to move into joint second. Bohen shot a 70 (−2) in the third round to move into solo second, though five behind leader Jones. In the final round, however, Jones played poorly, opening doors. On the 17th hole, Bohen made a 10-metre eagle putt to get close. However, he three-putted the par-3 18th for a bogey. He fell into a tie for the clubhouse lead with Mark Tapper, now two behind leader Jones. On the final hole, however, Jones hit his tee shot into the water; he would make double bogey to fall into a tie with Bohen and Tapper. He would compete in an 18-hole playoff against Jones and Mark Tapper the following day. Before the playoff began the players decided to share the prize money equally, irrespective of who won the event. Jones once again opened with a sizeable lead but "frittered away his advantage." Bohen held a one-stroke lead entering the par-5 17th hole. However, Tapper made an eagle putt of 14-metres to briefly take the lead. Bohen, though, completed a two-putt birdie to tie. On the final hole Tapper nearly made a hole in one. Bohen was unable to match his birdie giving Tapper the win. Bohen was not particularly upset with the loss, however. "What can you do with a guy like that?" he stated after the round. "I finished birdie, par and he goes two shots better." There was a brief controversy following the event as the players were not allowed to share the prize money. The Australian PGA threatened to punish the players involved. For the remainder of the Asia-Pacific season, Bohen recorded a few more highlights. In late January, he played the Tasmanian Open. At the par-72 course, Bohen opened with rounds of 69 and 70 to position himself close, in joint second. He failed to break par on the weekend but still finished in the top ten, three out of a playoff. Shortly thereafter, he moved onto the Asia Golf Circuit. During the first week of April he played the Indian Open at Royal Calcutta Golf Club. He opened with a three-under-par 70 to take a one-stroke lead over Australia's Mike Ferguson and Japan's Yoshikazu Yokoshima. Australian legend Peter Thomson and American pro Don Klenk were a further shot back. He retained the lead after the second and third rounds. However, in the final round Bohen "slipped" with a 75. He finished three behind champion Thomson.

Bohen returned to the United States in the spring of 1976. In May, he had success at a regional qualifier for the 1976 U.S. Open in Westchester. He had consecutive rounds of 71 to finish in third place, only behind Gene Borek and Jimmy Wright, to reach the sectional qualifier. The section qualifier would be held two weeks later in Stanwich Golf Club in Greenwich, Connecticut. Bohen ultimately qualified for the event. In June, he played the event proper at Atlanta Athletic Club, missing the cut. Later in the summer, in August, he played the Metropolitan Open in New York. He did not begin the tournament particularly well. He opened with a 72 (+1). On the first hole of the second round he hit his approach in the water and made bogey. Thereafter, however, he played excellently, shooting four-under-par for the remainder of the round, taking only 24 putts in total. It was the best he putted in memory. He took the solo lead by two shots over Jimmy Wright. Bohen played poorly in the final round, however, allowing several players back in contention. On the final hole he still had a chance to win but missed a seven-foot birdie putt. He finished with a 75 (+3). At 215 (−1), he entered a three-hole playoff with Lloyd Monroe and Wright to determine the champion. Monroe recorded a birdie on the first hole to take a one shot lead. Wright hit his approach on the par-5 2nd hole into a water hazard to fall out of contention. Bohen made a 25-foot birdie putt to briefly tie but Wright holed a nine-foot birdie putt to regain the lead. Monroe's "downfall," on the final hole, was on the approach shot, hitting it over the green. He made bogey. Bohen, meanwhile, made a downhill 15-foot birdie putt for the win. Bohen won $2,750, his highest paycheck in tournament golf through this date.

A few weeks after his win, Bohen returned to the Australasian region for the 1976-77 season. Due to his success the previous season, he was now considered the favorite among sportswriters in the run-up to tournaments. In January 1977, he played the Ben Guzzardi – Total Golf Classic at Traralgon Golf Club. He opened with a 64 (−7) to tie Mike Cahill for the lead. He and Cahill broke the course record. Bohen shot a second round 71 (E) to stay near the lead. In the third and final round, he took control with a front nine 32 (−4). He played poorly on the back nine, missing several greens. However, other than a bogey on the 15th he "always managed to salvage the situation," scrambling well, ultimately shooting even-par after the turn. His 202 (−11) total gave him the lead. Australian Noel Ratcliffe had a chance to force a playoff with a four-metre putt on the last hole but it lipped out. It was Bohen's "first major win in Australia." He won A$2,000. The following month, in February, Bohen played the South Australian Open at Royal Adelaide Golf Club. He did not open the tournament well, shooting three consecutive rounds in the mid-70s. At 226 (+7) he was in danger of missing the third round cut. However, Rob McNaughton, who was among the 36-hole leaders, had a "disastrous" close, ultimately shooting 85, allowing Bohen to make the cut on the number. Bohen's final round again did not begin particularly well either; he shot one-over-par for the first five holes. However, starting on the 6th hole he made eight consecutive "3s," punctuated by a 14-metre eagle chip-in on the par-5 9th. The run ended on the 14th hole as Bohen hit his approach in a bunker and was forced to save par. On the par-5 15th hole, however, Bohen made a 7-metre putt for another eagle and followed it up with a 5-metre birdie on the 16th. His ten-under-par round of 63 broke Royal Adelaide's course record by three shots. He moved up 40 spots on the leaderboard from last place, 14 shots behind, to a tie for fourth, two out of a playoff. He needed only 19 putts in his round. He later stated it was his greatest round as a touring professional. Shortly thereafter, Bohen moved on to the Asia Golf Circuit. In March, he played the Thailand Open. Bohen was three shots behind leader Yurio Akitomi entering Sunday. In the final round, Bohen remained three back at the turn but "burnt up the greens" early on the back nine, "shooting successive birdies on the 10th, 11th, and 12th" to tie. He ultimately entered a sudden-death playoff with Akitomi and Takahiro Takeyasu, also of Japan. The tie "remained unbroken through six holes of the playoff" as no player was able to break through. However, on the seventh playoff hole both Bohen and Takeyasu made bogey giving Akitomi the win. Overall, Bohen won US$18,000 for the season.

A few weeks later he returned to America. In August 1977, he attempted to defend his Metropolitan Open championship. The event was held at Meadow Brook Golf Club. After two rounds he was at 142 (−2), one behind leader Tom Ulozas. Tight fairways and "difficult pin placements" produced poor play for most of the leaders. Bohen's even-par round of 72 won the tournament easily. He earned $4,000 for his performance. Bohen became the first player in 39 years to successfully defend the championship since Jimmy Hines did in 1938. The only other players to successfully defend the Metropolitan Open were Alex Smith and Walter Hagen at the beginning of the century. Later in the year, however, he broke his left hand. Influenced by this affliction, Bohen decided to forego any attempts to renew his career on the PGA Tour. His hand ultimately took two years to fully heal.

Late in 1978, he began playing more, playing in some local events. In September he seriously competed for the Metropolitan PGA Championship. Early in the tournament he struggled, opening with a two-over-par 72 and then double-bogeying the first hole of the second round. However, he shot four-under-par for the remainder of the second round to tie the lead with David Glenz. In the third round, Bohen shot a 75 (+5) to finish one back of champion Austin Straub. He won $2,550 for his runner-up performance.

In the fall, he once more returned to Australia. He did not recorded many highlights in the beginning of the year. In November 1978 he played the New South Wales Open. He was in the top ten after the first three rounds. In the final round he shot a 76 (+4), however, to fall into a tie for 15th. The following week he played the Australian PGA Championship. He did not place very high, however, finishing at 302 (+14), eighteen shots behind champion Stewart Ginn. Bohen had much more success at the Tasmanian Open in February 1979. It was the fourth time he played the event. At the par-70 course, Bohen opened with rounds of 66 and 68 to take a one-stroke lead over the "early favorite" Greg Norman. Bohen scored a third round 67 (−3) to put himself at 201 (−9). He had a two shot lead over New Zealand's Terry Kendall. In the final round, Bohen had an up and down day with several birdies and several bogeys. However, his main competitor, Kendall, was unable to take advantage of Bohen's erratic play, shooting a 72 (+2). Bohen defeated him by four. "It is unbelievable, absolutely unbelievable," Bohen said after the round. It was his first win in a 72-hole tournament. In addition to the sizable gap between him and Kendall, Bohen defeated the remainder of the field by at least eight shots, including joint third-place finisher Norman.

In March 1980, he was appointed head club professional at Spook Rock Golf Course in Suffern, New York. Bohen continued to work as the head pro through the 1980s. Bohen was known for his work ethic and would often work 70 hours a week, sometimes every day. Bohen also would regularly host tournaments and clinics at Spook Rock. In his free time, he also continued to play in some local tournaments. In addition, during this era Bohen qualified for a major championship, the 1984 PGA Championship. He shot rounds of 81 and 77 and missed the cut.

In the early 1990s, Bohen turned 50. He began playing some events on the Senior PGA TOUR. The first event he played was the NYNEX Commemorative. He played the same event the following year. Bohen would continue to play some Senior PGA events throughout the decade, including three major championships, though he would never become a member of the senior tour. During the decade, he continued to work as the head professional at Spook Rock. He also played in some local senior events. In 1999, he won a local senior event hosted by the National Baseball Hall of Fame and Museum. He also played in some local regular events.

As of 2007, he still worked at Spook Rock. Most recently, Bohen was assigned Director of Golfing Programs at Kutsher's Country Club.

Bohen estimates he won at least US$100,000 in prize money as a touring professional.

== Personal life ==
In 1984, Bohen got married.

== Amateur wins (1) ==
- 1965 Nevada Amateur

== Professional wins (6) ==
=== PGA Tour of Australasia wins (1) ===
No.	Date	Tournament	Winning score	Margin of victory	Runner-up
1	Feb 4, 1979	Tattersall's Tasmanian Open	−9 (66-68-67-70=271)	4 strokes	(New Zealand) Terry Kendall

PGA Tour of Australasia playoff record (0–1)

No.	Year	Tournament	Opponents	Result
1	1976	New South Wales PGA Championship	(Australia) Brian Jones, (Australia) Mark Tapper	Tapper won 18-hole playoff; Tapper: −1 (71), Bohen: E (72), Jones: +1 (73)

=== Other wins (5) ===
- 1966 Nevada Open
- 1976 Metropolitan Open
- 1977 Ben Guzzardi – Total Golf Classic, Metropolitan Open
- 1999 Otesaga Hotel Seniors Open

== Playoff record ==
Asia Golf Circuit playoff record (0–1)

No.	Year	Tournament	Opponents	Result
1	1977	Thailand Open	(Japan) Yurio Akitomi, (Japan) Takahiro Takeyasu	Akitomi won with par on seventh extra hole Takeyasu eliminated by par on second hole

== Results in major championships ==
Tournament	1969	1970	1971	1972	1973	1974	1975	1976	1977	1978	1979	1980	1981	1982	1983	1984
U.S. Open	64	CUT		T55				CUT								
PGA Championship																CUT

Note: Bohen never played in the Masters Tournament or The Open Championship

Did not play

CUT = missed the half-way cut
"T" = tied
