= Queanbeyan City Open =

Australian golf tournament

The Queanbeyan City Open was a professional golf tournament in Australia. It was an official event on the PGA Tour of Australasia in 1976 and 1977. The tournament was held at Queanbeyan Golf Club in Queanbeyan, New South Wales, a suburb of Canberra. It was the first major tournament at the Queanbeyan Golf Club.

== Tournament summaries ==
The first tournament was in 1976; 103 professionals entered the event. It is best remembered for the excellent performance of Randall Vines. Even par for the first 27 holes, Vines started the back nine with a chip-in eagle on the 10th hole and two holes later holed out from the fairway for another eagle. This was followed by three straight birdies. But for near misses on the 16th and 17th holes his score could have been even lower. Nonetheless, Vines stated his 28 (7 under par) was the best nine holes of his career and his round of 62 put him one behind leader Mark Tapper. Both players shot matching 68s in the 3rd round and Tapper remained one ahead. In the final round Vines drove the ball extremely erratically but hit a number of extraordinary approaches from the rough or behind trees and even the wrong fairway. This enabled him to make a number of birdies and he ultimately cruised to a four shot win.

The following year's event was sponsored by Realty Realizations and the purse grew by A$5,000. It is best remembered for the duel between Barry Burgess and Greg Norman down the stretch. Burgess shot an opening round 68 and then stormed into the lead with a second round 65. His total 133 (−7) was two better than Norman. Burgess maintained his two shot lead over Norman with a third round 70. In the final round Burgess went bogey-free on the front nine. However, Norman made a number of birdies early and then birdied the par-3 13th hole to tie Burgess, the first time he held a share of the lead over the weekend. Burgess, playing behind Norman, was in danger of losing the lead at the same hole after hitting his approach down a bank. However he saved par. Burgess regained the solo lead with a birdie on the par-5 16th, a hole which had already produced a birdie and two eagles for him that week. Norman's "downfall" was on the 17th. His approach nearly went out of bounds and landed next to a fence. He barely had room to swing and bogeyed creating a two stroke differential. This difference remained as Burgess completed a bogey-free 68 to win by two. Defending champion Randall Vines had the best final round of the tournament and finished in a tie for fourth.

In 1978 the tournament, unlike the first two events, was unable to secure a major sponsor. The purse, therefore, was reduced significantly to A$6,000 and the tournament to 36 holes. As a reaction, many players decided not to commit to the event. Subsequently, the tournament then was considering cancellation, as only 34 players had committed by February 20, about two weeks before the event was to begin. However, just days later 19 additional players committed giving organizers confidence that field would reach its 60 player threshold and ensuring the tournament's viability. The event was scheduled for March 4 and 5. Canberra's Peter Kohlsdorf won the pro-am, held on 3 March, by one shot. Ian Norrie won the event proper with two rounds of 65, finishing four strokes ahead of Kohlsdorf.

== Winners ==
Year	Winner	Score	Margin of victory	Runner-up	Prize money (A$)	Winner's share (A$)	Ref
1976	(Australia) Randall Vines	269	4 strokes	(Australia) Mark Tapper	10,000	2,000	
1977	(Australia) Barry Burgess	271	2 strokes	(Australia) Greg Norman	15,000	3,000	
1978	(Australia) Ian Norrie	130	4 strokes	(Australia) Peter Kohlsdorf	6,000	1,200	
1979	(Australia) Col Robbie	130	Card playoff	(Australia) Hec Fuller (Australia) Frank Ross			
1980	(Australia) Ian Hore	146	2 strokes	(Australia) Craig Petterson (a)			
