= Griffith Golf Classic =

The Griffith Golf Classic was a golf tournament held in Australia in 1978 in Griffith, New South Wales. It was a PGA Tour of Australia event with prize money of A$15,000.

== History ==
Randall Vines beat Ian Stanley at the fifth hole of a sudden-death playoff after they tied on 280. Rob McNaughton and Peter Pearce tied for third place, a stroke behind.

== Winners ==
Year	Winner	Country	Score	To par	Margin of victory	Runner-up	Ref
1978	Randall Vines	Australia	280	−4	Playoff	(Australia) Ian Stanley	
