= Royal Fremantle Golf Club =

Golf club in Fremantle, Western Australia

Coordinates: 32°03′05″S 115°46′29″E

- Interactive map of Royal Fremantle Golf Club

Club information
- Established: 1905; 121 years ago
- Type: Private
- Website: www.royalfremantlegc.com.au/cms/

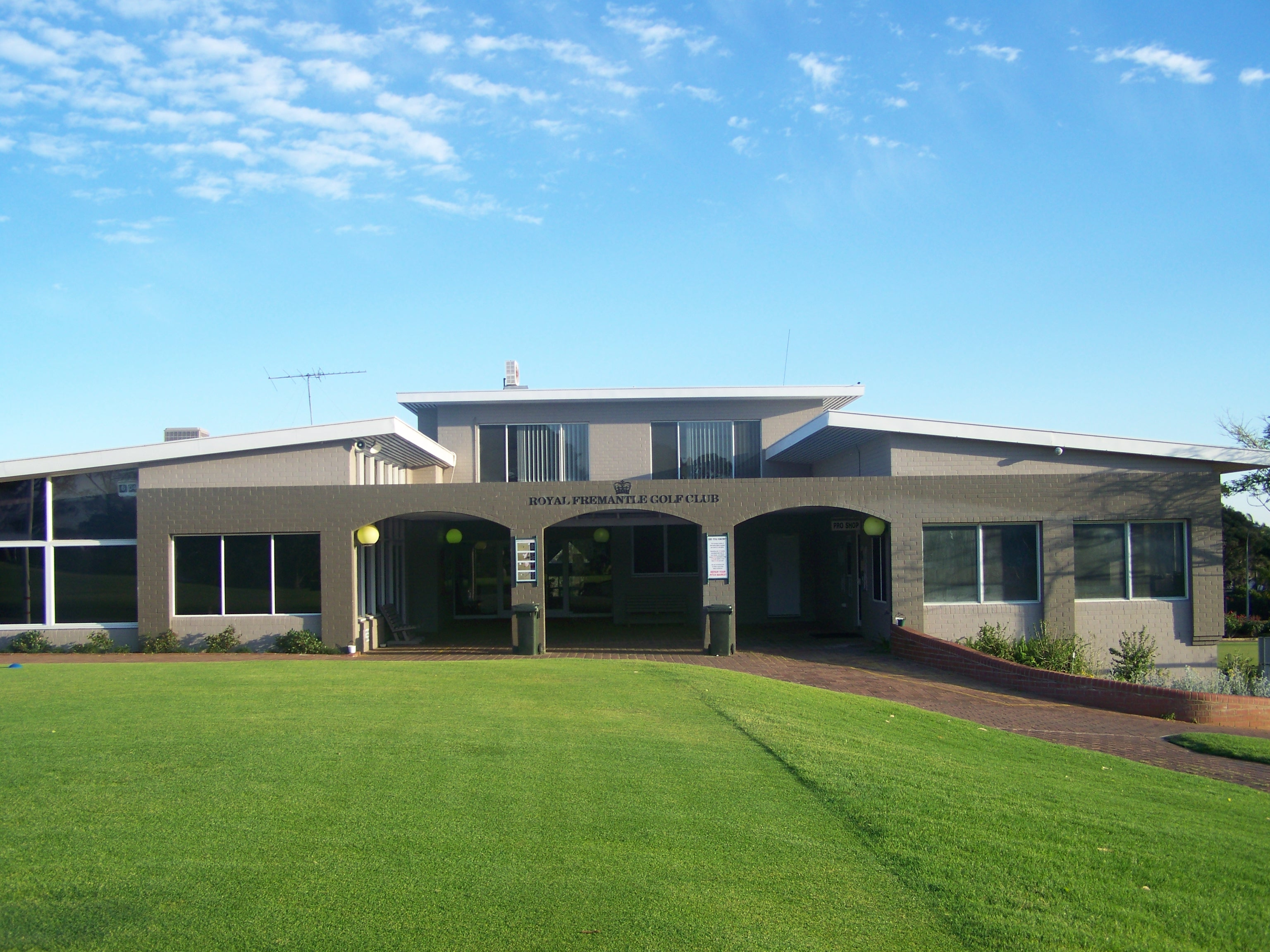
Club house in 2010

Royal Fremantle Golf Club is a golf club in the Perth suburb of Fremantle in Western Australia. It was established in 1905. Multiple prominent golf tournaments have been hosted at the venue including the Australian PGA Championship and Royal Fremantle Open.

== History ==
In 1904, roughly twenty people who lived in the Fremantle area met regularly at His Lordship's Larder (later known as His Majesty's Hotel), on the corner of Phillimore and Mouat streets, to talk about creating a golf course. On 20 July 1905, a club was formally created. For the site of the course, the members quickly decided to use 79 hectares (196 acres) of government land that was currently being leased to cattle famers. In early August that year, the Fremantle Municipal Council approved a loan of £500, equivalent to A$84,300 in 2022, to assist with the development of the first nine holes. A month later, in September, the club had 60 members and, in November, was formally incorporated.

However, there were many problems converting the designated territory into a golf course. The terrain was rocky and had an inadequate water supply. Cattle, rabbits, and goats regularly trespassed into the land. The goats were especially problematic, as they would often eat "young tree plantings as fast as they were planted." The establishment of pig wire netting was originally recommended but, in efforts to save money, the club ultimately decided to construct warning signs "that goats trespassing on the Links Reserve will be shot."

Despite the challenges, by 1906 the first nine holes "became playable." The following year the Governor of Western Australia officially opened the course. In 1909 the full 18 holes were completed. Fremantle became the first 18-hole course in the state. Two years later it hosted the state's inaugural amateur championship. It also hosted a club championship in 1909.

Membership climbed during the first decade of the club's history but abruptly dropped during World War I. However, by 1930 membership had returned to pre-war levels. In addition, in 1930 the Monarchy of the United Kingdom certified the club's "Royal status". At that time, Royal Fremantle was "the Premier Club in Western Australia."

The course has hosted several significant golf tournaments over its history. In 1960 it hosted the Australian PGA Championship. In the late 1970s and early 80s it hosted the Royal Fremantle Open. In 2005, 100 years after it was created in 1905, the club celebrated its centenary.

== Other information ==
The course is 6,175 metres (20,259 ft) long and has Kikuyu fairways and Bentgrass greens. In the early 1980s a course record of 66 was established. It stood for 25 years until 2006 when Ric Kulacz, a local amateur player, shot a 64. This record was tied by Paul Fenton in 2009 at the course's club championship. Minjee Lee, one of the top female golfers in the world, honed her game at the club, and touring professionals Craig Parry and Greg Chalmers both graduated from the club's junior program.

== Tournaments hosted ==
- 2020: Western Australian Open
- 2015: Western Australia Open
- 2011: Western Australia Open
- 1982: Royal Fremantle Open
- 1981: Royal Fremantle Open
- 1980: Royal Fremantle Open
- 1979: Royal Fremantle Open
- 1978: Royal Fremantle Open
- 1977: Royal Fremantle Open
- 1973: Western Australia State Open
- 1961: Western Australia junior championship
- 1960: Australian PGA Championship
- 1947: Western Australia PGA Championship
- 1937: Western Australia PGA Championship
- 1933: Western Australia PGA Championship

== See also ==
- List of golf clubs granted Royal status
- List of Australian organisations with royal patronage
