= Mark Tapper =

Australian professional golfer

Personal information
- Nationality: Australia

Career
- Sport: Golf
- Status: Professional
- Former tour: PGA Tour of Australasia
- Professional wins: 1

Number of wins by tour
- PGA Tour of Australasia: 1

Mark Tapper is an Australian professional golfer.

== Early life ==
Tapper is from Sydney, Australia. He trained to be a pro in the early 1970s.

== Professional career ==
During the 1972–73 season, Tapper first received media attention. He held the first round lead of the North Coast Open held at Coffs Harbour, Australia. Tapper also had some highlights in New Zealand. He finished third at the Manor Park pro-am event. Tapper also recorded a hole-in-one during the first round of the Garden City Classic. In late 1973, he had the chance to win his first major event at the three-round Hibiscus Coast Classic. The event was held at the Peninsular Golf Club in Orewa, New Zealand. Tapper opened with a 65 (−7) to break the course record and tie Terry Kendall for the lead. He followed with a 68 to take a two-shot lead. In the final round, however, "he dropped shots at the third and fourth holes" to quickly lose his lead. Tapper ultimately finished with a 73 to lose to Kendall by two.

Despite this decent start, Tapper would have to wait until the mid-1970s for substantive success. He won a number of minor tournaments across Australia in 1975, including the Bankstown pro-am by two over Peter Kohlsdorf. This good play would culminate at the New South Wales PGA Championship. Tapper was seven behind Brian Jones as the final round began but shot a bogey-free 69 (−3) to get into contention. Marty Bohen, who was in second place, had a chance to take the clubhouse lead but bogeyed the final hole to fall into a tie with Tapper. Jones, the leader all day, had a weak final round and then double-bogeyed the 18th to fall into a tie with Tapper and Bohen. The three men competed in an 18-hole playoff on Monday. Jones again built a sizable lead – this time by three shots after seven holes – but would ultimately lose it once more. Tapper was one back of Bohen entering the 17th hole but made a 14-meter eagle putt to tie the American. On the final hole, a par-3, Tapper nearly made an ace; his birdie would win it. This performance would help him earn the Most Improved Player award by the New South Wales Professional Golfers Association in February.

At the very end of the season, in March, Tapper was in contention one final time. At the Queanbeyan City Open, he shot opening rounds of 66 (−4) to take a one shot lead over Randall Vines, a lead that would remain entering the final round. Tapper three putted the first hole, however, presaging "putting miseries" that would plague him for the remainder of the day. He ultimately shot 73 and finished four behind Vines.

Despite all of the success during the 1975–76 season, however, Tapper's career on the PGA Tour of Australia did not advance. Back injuries would disrupt his career. The 1977–78 season was the final one with any highlights. He led the Tuggerah Lakes Open and New South Wales Open after the first round. He also finished third at that season's Queanbeyan City Open's pro-am, the site of one his best placings on tour, two behind Peter Kohlsdorf.

== Professional wins (1) ==
=== PGA Tour of Australasia wins (1) ===
No.	Date	Tournament	Winning score	Margin of victory	Runners-up
1	12 Jan 1976	New South Wales PGA Championship	−7 (72-71-69-69=281)	Playoff	(United States) Marty Bohen, (Australia) Brian Jones

PGA Tour of Australasia playoff record (1–0)

No.	Year	Tournament	Opponents	Result
1	1976	New South Wales PGA Championship	(United States) Marty Bohen, (Australia) Brian Jones	Won 18-hole playoff; Tapper: −1 (71), Bohen: E (72), Jones: +1 (73)
