= 2000 European Seniors Tour =

Golf tour season

2000 European Seniors Tour season
- Duration: 30 March 2000 – 28 October 2000
- Number of official events: 20
- Most wins: (United States) John Grace (3)
- Order of Merit: (Australia) Noel Ratcliffe
- Rookie of the Year: (Brazil) Priscillo Diniz

The 2000 European Seniors Tour was the ninth season of the European Seniors Tour, the main professional golf tour in Europe for men aged 50 and over.

== Schedule ==
The following table lists official events during the 2000 season.

Date	Tournament	Host country	Purse (€)	Winner (Note: The number in brackets after each winner's name is the number of European Seniors Tour events they had won up to and including that tournament. This information is only shown for European Seniors Tour members.)	Notes
1 Apr	Royal Westmoreland Barbados Open	Barbados	US$150,000	(England) Tommy Horton (23)	New tournament
7 May	Beko Classic	Turkey	US$300,000	(Wales) Brian Huggett (10)	
14 May	AIB Irish Seniors Open	Ireland	280,000	(United States) Bruce Fleisher (1)	
4 Jun	Microlease Jersey Seniors Open	Jersey	£100,000	(England) Neil Coles (8)	
24 Jun	Lawrence Batley Seniors	England	£110,000	(Scotland) David Huish (3)	
2 Jul	Coca-Cola Kaiser Karl European Trophy	Germany	150,000	(Australia) Ian Stanley (1)	
9 Jul	TotalFina Elf Seniors Open	France	150,000	(England) Nick Job (1)	
30 Jul	Senior British Open	Northern Ireland	£400,000	(Republic of Ireland) Christy O'Connor Jnr (2)	Senior major championship
6 Aug	Energis Senior Masters	England	£175,000	(England) David Creamer (1)	
13 Aug	Bad Ragaz PGA Seniors Open	Switzerland	200,000	(Scotland) David Huish (4)	
20 Aug	De Vere Hotels Seniors Classic	England	£115,000	(United States) David Oakley (2)	
28 Aug	The Belfry PGA Seniors Championship	England	£180,000	(United States) John Grace (1)	
3 Sep	The Scotsman Scottish Seniors Open	Scotland	£100,000	(Australia) Noel Ratcliffe (3)	
10 Sep	Ordina Legends in Golf	Netherlands	165,000	(United States) John Grace (2)	
17 Sep	Tui Golf Championship Fleesensee	Germany	200,000	(United States) Jeff Van Wagenen (1)	
24 Sep	TEMES Seniors Open	Greece	200,000	(Australia) Noel Ratcliffe (4)	
8 Oct	Big 3 Records Monte Carlo Invitational	France	215,000	(United States) John Grace (3)	
14 Oct	The Daily Telegraph European Seniors Match Play Championship	Portugal	£100,000	(Brazil) Priscillo Diniz (1)	New tournament
22 Oct	Dan Technology Senior Tournament of Champions	England	£115,000	(Republic of Ireland) Denis O'Sullivan (1)	
28 Oct	Abu Dhabi European Seniors Tour Championship	UAE	US$300,000	(Republic of Ireland) Denis O'Sullivan (2)	New tournament Tour Championship

== Order of Merit ==
The Order of Merit was based on prize money won during the season, calculated in Euros.

Position	Player	Prize money (€)
1	(Australia) Noel Ratcliffe	163,164
2	(United States) John Grace	161,525
3	(Republic of Ireland) Denis O'Sullivan	156,966
4	(England) Tommy Horton	147,767
5	(Australia) Ian Stanley	137,679

== Awards ==
Award	Winner	Ref.
Rookie of the Year	(Brazil) Priscillo Diniz	
