= 2001 Senior British Open =

Tournament information
- Dates: 26–29 July 2001
- Location: Newcastle, County Down, Northern Ireland; 54.218°N 5.884°W
- Course: Royal County Down Golf Club
- Organised by: The R&A
- Tours: European Seniors Tour; Senior PGA Tour
- Format: 72 holes stroke play

Statistics
- Par: 71
- Length: 6,613 yd (6,047 m)
- Field: 132 players, 68 after cut
- Cut: 150 (+8)
- Prize fund: €777,397.92
- Winner's share: €129,566.3

Champion
- (Australia) Ian Stanley
- 278 (−6)
- Location in Europe Location in British Isles Location in Ireland Location in Northern Ireland

The 2001 Senior British Open, for sponsorship reasons named Senior British Open presented by MasterCard, was a professional golf tournament for players aged 50 and above and the 15th British Senior Open Championship, held from 26 to 29 July at Royal County Down Golf Club in Newcastle, County Down, Northern Ireland, United Kingdom.

In 2018, the tournament was, as were all Senior British Open Championships played 1987–2002, retroactively recognized as a senior major golf championship and a PGA Tour Champions (at the time named the Senior PGA Tour) event.

Ian Stanley won in a playoff over Bob Charles to win his first Senior British Open title and first senior major championship victory.

== Venue ==
The hosting course, one of the oldest on the island of Ireland, originally designed by Old Tom Morris and located in naturally links settings in the Murlough Nature Reserve, stretching along the shores of Dundrum Bay, was established in 1889.

The course had previously hosted the 2000 Senior British Open Championship and several editions of the Irish Open, The Amateur Championship and the British Ladies Amateur Golf Championship and the 1968 Curtis Cup.

The event was the first of three editions of the Senior British Open, three years in a row, held at the Royal County Down Golf Club.

=== Course layout ===
| Hole | Yards | Par | Hole | Yards | Par |
|---|---|---|---|---|---|
| 1 | 502 | 5 | 10 | 197 | 3 |
| 2 | 371 | 4 | 11 | 384 | 4 |
| 3 | 454 | 4 | 12 | 479 | 5 |
| 4 | 194 | 3 | 13 | 421 | 4 |
| 5 | 416 | 4 | 14 | 203 | 3 |
| 6 | 369 | 4 | 15 | 449 | 4 |
| 7 | 145 | 3 | 16 | 276 | 4 |
| 8 | 425 | 4 | 17 | 375 | 4 |
| 9 | 425 | 4 | 18 | 528 | 5 |
| Out | 3,301 | 35 | In | 3,312 | 36 |
| Source: | | Total | | 6,613 | 71 |

== Field ==
132 players, 120 professionals and 12 amateurs, entered the competition.

Two qualifying tournaments were held on Tuesday 24 July. 30 players, 25 professionals and five amateurs qualified through an 18-hole qualifying round at Kilkeel Golf Club. 31 players, 26 professionals and five amateurs qualified through an 18-hole qualifying round at Spa Golf Club on 24 July. They joined 61 players, who were exempt into the championship.

Two players withdraw before the cut. 68 players, 66 professionals and two amateurs, made the 36-hole cut. One player withdraw after the cut.

=== Past champions in the field ===
Seven past Senior British Open champions participated. All of them made the 36-hole cut.

Defending champion Christy O'Connor Jnr did not play due to an ankle injury sustained when his motorcycle fell on him.

| Player | Country | Year(s) won | R1 | R2 | R3 | R4 | Total | To par | Finish |
|---|---|---|---|---|---|---|---|---|---|
| Bob Charles | New Zealand | 1989, 1993 | 69 | 69 | 72 | 68 | 278 | −6 | 2 |
| Bobby Verway | South Africa | 1991 | 74 | 66 | 69 | 72 | 284 | E | T5 |
| Brian Huggett | Wales | 1998 | 69 | 71 | 72 | 73 | 285 | +1 | T6 |
| Gary Player | South Africa | 1988, 1990 | 68 | 70 | 76 | 72 | 286 | +2 | T18 |
| Neil Coles | England | 1987 | 74 | 72 | 73 | 75 | 294 | +10 | T27 |
| Tom Wargo | United States | 1994 | 77 | 69 | 81 | 69 | 296 | +12 | T36 |
| John Fourie | South Africa | 1992 | 73 | 70 | 75 | 79 | 297 | +13 | T40 |

=== Past winners and runners-up at The Open Championship in the field ===
The field included five former winners of The Open Championship, Bob Charles (2nd), Jack Nicklaus (tied 3rd), Gary Player (tied 18th), Tony Jacklin (missed cut) and Arnold Palmer (missed cut).

The field also included three former runners-up at The Open Championship; Brian Huggett (tied 6th), Simon Owen (tied 6th) and Neil Coles (tied 27th).

== Final round and playoff summaries ==
=== Final round ===
Sunday, 29 July 2001

Bob Charles and Ian Stanley tied the lead after the fourth round, to meet in a sudden death playoff, to decide the winner. Stanley held a one-shot lead going into the final hole and three-putted to lose that advantage to finish with a 2-under par round 69, to tie with Charles, who finished with a round of 68.

Leading amateur, winning the Silver medal, was Arthur Pierse, Ireland, finishing tied 50th at 16 over par.

| Place | Player | Score | To par | Money (€) |
|---|---|---|---|---|
| T1 | (Australia) Ian Stanley | 70-69-70-69=278 | −6 | Playoff |
| T1 | (New Zealand) Bob Charles | 69-69-72-68=278 | −6 | Playoff |
| T3 | (England) John Morgan | 69-70-72-70=281 | −3 | 43,380.12 |
| T3 | (United States) Jack Nicklaus | 70-72-70-69=281 | −3 | 43,380.12 |
| 5 | (South Africa) Bobby Verwey | 74-66-69-72=284 | E | 31,981.56 |
| T6 | (Wales) Brian Huggett | 69-71-72-73=285 | +1 | 27,635.35 |
| T6 | (New Zealand) Simon Owen | 71-69-72-73=285 | +1 | 27,635.35 |
| 8 | (Scotland) Bernard Gallacher | 69-71-77-69=286 | +2 | 24,601.20 |
| T9 | (Australia) Noel Ratcliffe | 70-75-73-69=287 | +3 | 20,583.00 |
| T9 | (United States) Dave Stockton | 71-71-71-74=287 | +3 | 20,583.00 |
| T9 | (New Zealand) Barry Vivian | 72-74-72-69=287 | +3 | 20,583.00 |

=== Playoff ===
Sunday, 29 July 2001

The sudden-death playoff went on the par 5 18th hole, to be played until one of the players had a lower score on the hole than the other. Ian Stanley beat Bob Charles at the first extra hole. Stanley found the fairway, hitting a 4-iron from the tee, while Charles found a bunker with his tee shot. Stanley continued the hole with a 5-iron, a wedge and two putts, to save par. That was enough to beat Charles, who had previously won this championship twice, 1989 and 1993, and this was his sixth second place finish.

| Place | Player | Score | To par | Money (€) |
|---|---|---|---|---|
| 1 | (Australia) Ian Stanley | 5 | E | 129,566.30 |
| 2 | (New Zealand) Bob Charles | 6 | +1 | 82,332.02 |

| Preceded by 2001 Ford Senior Players Championship | Senior Major Championships | Succeeded by 2002 Senior PGA Championship |
