= Jim Rhodes (golfer) =

English golfer (1946–2015)

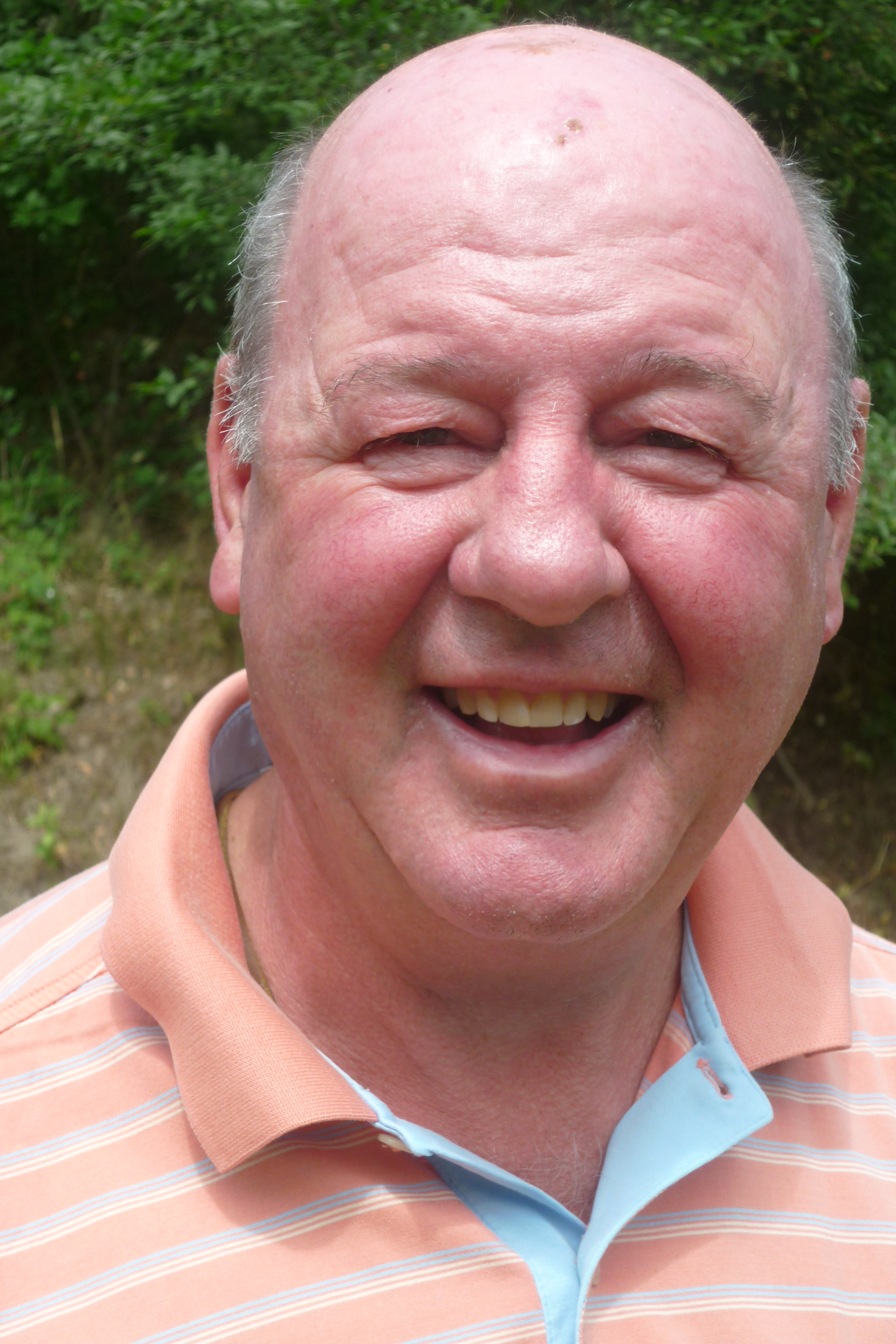

Personal information
- Full name: James Rhodes
- Nationality: England
- Born: 29 January 1946 Cannock, England
- Died: 4 March 2015 (aged 69)
- Height: 6 ft 1 in (1.85 m)
- Weight: 183 lb (83 kg; 13.1 st)
- Spouse: Pauline (m. 1971)
- Children: 1

Career
- Sport: Golf
- Turned professional: 1963
- Former tour: European Seniors Tour
- Professional wins: 5

Number of wins by tour
- European Senior Tour: 3
- Other: 2

Best results in major championships
- Masters Tournament: DNP
- PGA Championship: DNP
- U.S. Open: DNP
- The Open Championship: CUT: 1974, 1979

James Rhodes (29 January 1946 – 4 March 2015) was an English professional golfer.

== Career ==
In 1963, Rhodes turned professional and worked as a club professional, making only occasional appearances on the European Tour. In 1987 he won the European Club Professionals Championship in The Netherlands.

Rhodes joined the European Seniors Tour when he turned fifty and has been one of its most consistent players, winning three tournaments and finishing fifth on the Order of Merit in his best season, which was 1997. As of the 2010 season, he was ninth on the tour's career money list.

== Professional wins (5) ==
=== Regular career wins (2) ===
- 1987 European Club Professionals Championship
- 2000 PGA Senior Club Professional Championship

=== European Seniors Tour wins (3) ===
No.	Date	Tournament	Winning score	Margin of victory	Runner-up
1	27 Oct 2001	SSL International Sodexho Match Play Championship	2 up		(Wales) Craig Defoy
2	13 Jun 2004	Irvine Whitlock Jersey Seniors Classic	−11 (66-67-72=205)	3 strokes	(Scotland) John Chillas
3	10 Jul 2005	Nigel Mansell Sunseeker International Classic	−8 (67-66-66=208)	3 strokes	(England) Tony Charnley

European Seniors Tour playoff record (0–2)

No.	Year	Tournament	Opponent(s)	Result
1	1998	Swedish Seniors	(England) Maurice Bembridge	Lost to birdie on first extra hole
2	2004	De Vere PGA Seniors Championship	(Japan) Seiji Ebihara, (England) Carl Mason	Mason won with birdie on second extra hole Rhodes eliminated by par on first hole

== Team appearances ==
- Praia d'El Rey European Cup: 1997 (winners), 1998 (tie)
