= Coca-Cola Kaiser Karl European Trophy =

Tournament information
- Location: Eschweiler, Germany
- Established: 2000
- Course: Haus Kambach Golf und Freizeit
- Par: 72
- Length: 6,518 yards (5,960 m)
- Tour: European Seniors Tour
- Format: Stroke play
- Prize fund: €150,000
- Month played: June
- Final year: 2001

Tournament record score
- Aggregate: 203 Ian Stanley (2000)
- To par: −13 as above

Final champion
- (Australia) Ian Stanley
- Location in Germany Location in North Rhine-Westphalia

The Coca-Cola Kaiser Karl European Trophy was a men's senior (over 50) professional golf tournament on the European Seniors Tour, held at the Haus Kambach Golf und Freizeit near Eschweiler, North Rhine-Westphalia in western Germany. It was held just once, in July 2000, and was won by Ian Stanley who finished four shots ahead of Denis Durnian and Seiji Ebihara. The total prize fund was €149,000 with the winner receiving €22,782.

== Winners ==
Year	Winner	Score	To par	Margin of victory	Runners-up
2000	(Australia) Ian Stanley	203	−13	4 strokes	(England) Denis Durnian (Japan) Seiji Ebihara
