= Jeff Van Wagenen =

American golfer (born 1948)

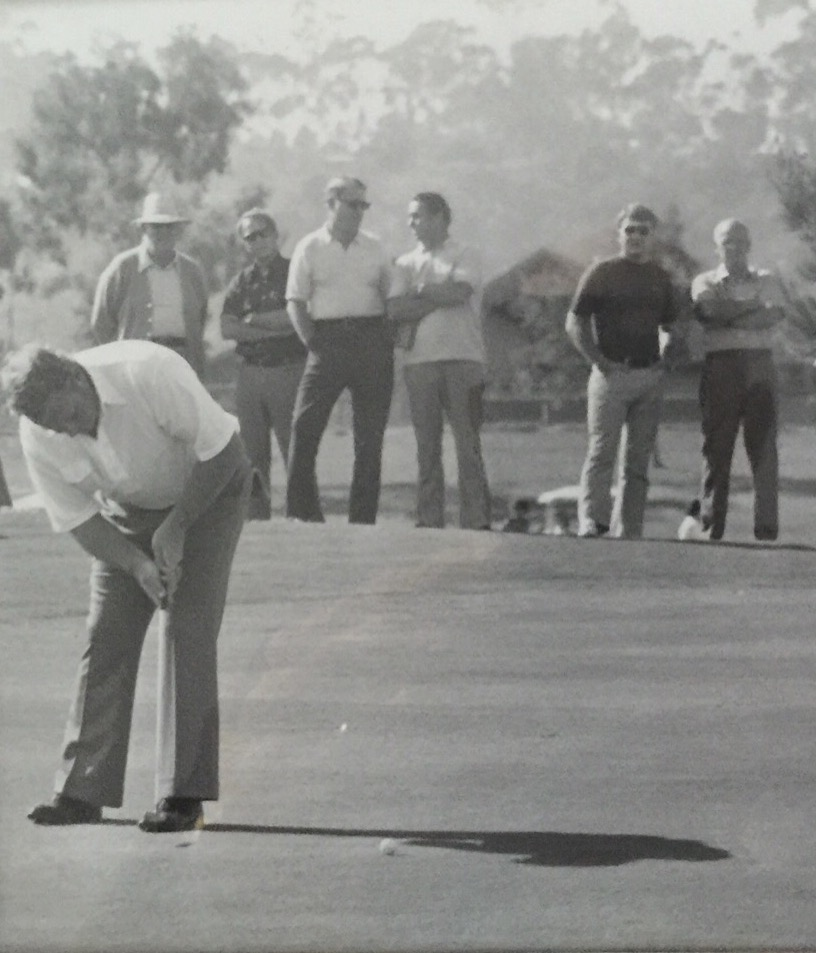
- Van Wagenen in Rancho Santa Fe, CA 1974

Personal information
- Nationality: United States
- Born: July 16, 1948 (age 78) Phoenix, Arizona, U.S.
- Height: 1.85 m (6 ft 1 in)
- Weight: 97 kg (214 lb; 15.3 st)

Career
- Sport: Golf
- College: Loyola Marymount University
- Turned professional: 1972 and 1996
- Former tour: European Senior Tour
- Professional wins: 1

Number of wins by tour
- European Senior Tour: 1

Jeff Van Wagenen (born July 16, 1948) is an American professional golfer who played on the European Seniors Tour and PGA Tour Champions from 1998 to 2008.

== Professional wins (1) ==
=== European Seniors Tour wins (1) ===
No.	Date	Tournament	Winning score	Margin of victory	Runners-up
1	Sep 17, 2000	Tui Golf Championship Fleesensee	−11 (67-68-73=208)	1 stroke	(England) Tommy Horton, (Australia) Noel Ratcliffe
