= Paul Foley (golfer) =

Australian professional golfer

Personal information
- Nationality: Australia
- Born: c. 1959
- Spouse: Preeya Phiboon
- Children: Samantha

Career
- Sport: Golf
- Turned professional: 1979
- Former tour: PGA Tour of Australasia
- Professional wins: 4

Number of wins by tour
- PGA Tour of Australasia: 2
- Other: 2

Best results in major championships
- Masters Tournament: DNP
- PGA Championship: DNP
- U.S. Open: DNP
- The Open Championship: CUT: 1981

Paul Foley (born c. 1959) is an Australian professional golfer. Foley turned pro as a teenager and quickly won an official event on the PGA Tour of Australasia, the 1980 Traralgon Classic, "stunning an experienced field." For remainder of the decade he played on the PGA Tour of Australasia and Asia Golf Circuit, winning one more significant event, the 1982 Queensland PGA Championship. Since retirement he has shepherded his daughter, Samantha, as a touring professional.

== Early life ==
Foley started playing golf in his early youth. He recorded his first hole-in-one at 13. Early in his career he worked as an assistant professional at Royal Queensland Golf Club. In 1978 Foley won the Australian Professional Trainee Championship. In late 1978 or early 1979 he turned professional.

== Professional career ==
Roughly one year after turning pro Foley "stunned an experienced field" at the Traralgon Classic and won his first professional tournament. He opened the final round at even par, several shots behind the leaders. However, he shot a front nine 33 (−4), which included five birdies, to get into contention. He played even better on the back nine, recording a six birdies for a 29 (−6). His final round 62 (−10) beat the course record by two strokes. It was the best score of his career, in any sort of event, by 6 shots. Fellow Australian Wayne Grady finished runner-up, six behind. Later in the year, he won the Australian Four-Ball with partner Geoff Parslow, a club professional at Tweed Heads. They defeated Bob Shaw and Ted Ball by one shot, shooting –18 as a team.

Foley played in the 1981 Open Championship at Royal St George's Golf Club, earning his place through final qualifying. He had rounds of 78 and 81 and missed the cut. He stated later in his career that Royal St George's is one of the best golf courses he has ever played on.

Foley would play well in late 1982 at two event in his home state of Queensland. In October, he finished in a tie for third place at the Dunhill Queensland Open. Late in the season, on 12 December, he tied Peter Fowler at the end of regulation of the Queensland PGA Championship. They defeated Greg Norman, Ossie Moore, and Wayne Grady by one shot. Foley defeated Fowler on the first playoff hole. Foley later described it as his biggest win.

Foley would continue to play well through the mid-1980s. He played well at the 1983 Australian Open, placing in second place after the first round and remaining one back entering Sunday. However he played poorly in the final round and finished outside of the top three. In 1984, he played excellently on the Queensland circuit, winning 10 pro-ams. Also that year, he represented Australia in the World Cup, playing with Mike Harwood. The following year, he finished runner-up at the 1985 Western Australia PGA Championship. Five shots behind entering the final round, Foley shot a 68 (−4) but was usurped by Ian Stanley's 66. He finished one back of Stanley. Much later in the year he played excellently at his home state's open, the Queensland Open. Well behind David Graham entering the final round, Foley made an early run with two birdies and an eagle to get within four shots of Graham at the turn. That would be as close as he would get, however, as Graham pulled away on the back nine and won by five. Foley's −14 total was eight better than those that finished in joint third place, which included defending Masters champion Bernhard Langer.

Foley went on a dry spell for several years but in 1988 he began to turn it around. Early in the year, in March, he finished a distant third in the Indonesia Open behind Hsieh Yu-shu. Later in the year, he had a chance to win at the Tasmanian Open, holding third place entering the final round, but fell to Brett Ogle. In 1989, he played excellently at the West End South Australian Open, taking the second round lead and then finishing eagle-birdie on Saturday to assure him a final group pairing with Nick Price on Sunday. During the final round Price started birdie-par-eagle and built a 7-shot lead after 8 holes to "virtually seal his win." Foley, however, played admirably over the final round at Royal Adelaide and shot a 72 (−1) to finish joint runner-up. Following year, he recorded his final top-10 in a PGA Tour of Australasia event, a T-9 in the Nedlands Masters. Foley largely stopped playing as a touring professional after the 1991–92 season.

== Personal life ==
Foley lives in Inglewood, Queensland. He is married to a Thai woman, Preeya Phiboon, who manages a hotel in Thailand. They have a daughter, Samantha Foley. She has had some success as an amateur golfer. Like her father, she has intentions of becoming a professional.

== Professional wins (4) ==
=== PGA Tour of Australasia wins (2) ===
No.	Date	Tournament	Winning score	Margin of victory	Runner-up
1	28 Jan 1980	Traralgon Classic	−10 (71-75-70-62=278)	6 strokes	(Australia) Wayne Grady
2	12 Dec 1982	Queensland PGA Championship	E (69-72-75-72=288)	Playoff	(Australia) Peter Fowler

PGA Tour of Australasia playoff record (1–0)

No.	Year	Tournament	Opponent	Result
1	1982	Queensland PGA Championship	(Australia) Peter Fowler	Won with par on first extra hole

=== Other wins (2) ===
- 1978 Australia Trainee Championship
- 1980 Australian Four-Ball Championship (with Geoff Parslow)

== Team appearances ==
Amateur

- Australian Men's Interstate Teams Matches (representing Queensland): 1976

Professional

- World Cup (representing Australia): 1984

== Results in major championships ==
Tournament	1981
The Open Championship	CUT

CUT = missed the halfway cut
Note: Foley only played in The Open Championship.
