= South Coast Open =

Golf tournament

The South Coast Open was a professional golf tournament held between 1975 and 1978 at Catalina Country Club in Batemans Bay on the South Coast of New South Wales, Australia. The 1975 and March 1976 events had prize money of A$10,000 with later events having prize money of A$15,000.

A pro-am was organised at Catalina Country Club by Batemans Bay Lions Club in February 1974. Vic Bennetts won with a score of 137. Prize money was A$6,000.

The March 1976 event was abandoned because of a flooded course. No play was possible on the first day and the event was re-arranged so that there would be 36 holes on the Sunday. However, after a second day without any play, the tournament was abandoned.

An event was scheduled for September 1979 but was cancelled due to lack of sponsorship.

== Winners ==
Year	Winner	Country	Score	To par	Margin of victory	Runner(s)-up	Ref
McCallum's South Coast Open
1978	Bryan Smith	Australia	280	−4	1 stroke	(United States) Art Russell	
1977	Rodger Davis	Australia	271	−13	4 strokes	(Australia) Terry Gale	
South Coast Open
1976 (Oct)	Barry Burgess	Australia	277	−7	1 stroke	(Australia) David Good (Australia) Ross Metherell	
1976 (Mar)	Tournament abandoned						
1975	Kel Nagle	Australia	276	−8	1 stroke	(Australia) Bob Shearer	
