= Tui Golf Championship Fleesensee =

Tournament information
- Location: Fleesensee, Germany
- Established: 2000
- Course: Golfclub Fleesensee
- Par: 73
- Length: 6,513 yards (5,955 m)
- Tour: European Seniors Tour
- Format: Stroke play
- Prize fund: €200,000
- Month played: June
- Final year: 2001

Tournament record score
- Aggregate: 208 Jeff Van Wagenen (2000)
- To par: −11 as above

Final champion
- (United States) Jeff Van Wagenen
- Location in Germany Location in Mecklenburg-Vorpommern

The Tui Golf Championship Fleesensee was a men's senior (over 50) professional golf tournament on the European Seniors Tour, held on the Schloss course at the Golfclub Fleesensee near Fleesensee, Göhren-Lebbin, Mecklenburg-Vorpommern in north-east Germany. It was held just once, in September 2000, and was won by Jeff Van Wagenen who finished a shot ahead of Tommy Horton and Noel Ratcliffe. The total prize fund was €200,000 with the winner receiving €32,750.

== Winners ==
Year	Winner	Score	To par	Margin of victory	Runners-up
2000	(United States) Jeff Van Wagenen	208	−11	1 stroke	(England) Tommy Horton (Australia) Noel Ratcliffe
