= 1973 World Cup =

Coordinates: 36°31′0″N 4°53′0″W

Tournament information
- Dates: 22–25 November
- Location: Marbella, Spain
- Course: Club de Golf Nueva Andalucía
- Format: 72 holes stroke play combined score

Statistics
- Par: 72
- Length: 6,905 yards (6,314 m)
- Field: 49 two-man teams
- Cut: None
- Prize fund: US$6,300 $4,200 team $2,100 individual
- Winner's share: $2,000 team $1,000 individual

Champion
- United States; Johnny Miller & Jack Nicklaus
- 558 (-18)

The 1973 World Cup took place 22–25 November at the Club de Golf Nueva Andalucía in Marbella, Spain. The name of the club was later changed to Real Club de Golf Las Brisas. It was the 21st World Cup event. The tournament was a 72-hole stroke play team event with 49 teams. Each team consisted of two players from a country.

Team Czechoslovakia of Jiri Dvorak and Jaromir Fuchs were notified but withdrew from the tournament before it began. Also before the tournament began, notable player withdrawals were Peter Thomson, selected to the Australian team, replaced by Errol Hardvigsen, Peter Oosterhuis, selected to the English team, replaced by Peter Wilcock, Terry Kendall, selected to the New Zealand team, replaced by Simon Owen and Brian Huggett, selected to the Welsh team, replaced by David Vaughan.

The combined score of each team determined the team's results. The United States team of Johnny Miller and Jack Nicklaus won by six strokes over the South Africa team of Hugh Baiocchi and Gary Player. This was the 12th team victory for the United States, six of them with Jack Nicklaus on the team, in the event, formerly named Canada Cup, since its inception in 1953.

The individual competition for the International Trophy, was won by Miller, three strokes ahead of Player.

== Teams ==
This list of players is incomplete

Country	Players
Argentina	Fidel de Luca and Roberto De Vicenzo
Australia	Errol Hardvigsen and Randall Vines
Austria	Oswald Gartenmaier and Rudolph Hauser
Belgium	Donald Swaelens and Philippe Toussaint
Brazil	Luis Carlos Pinto and Humberto Rocha
Canada	Phil Giroux and Bob Panasik
Chile	Francisco Cerda and Rafael Jerez
Colombia	Alfonso Bohórquez and Heraclio Valenzuela
Denmark	Herluf Hansen and Henrik Lund
Dominican Republic	Arturo Pellerano and Carlos M. Puebla
Egypt	Mahmound Abedunahab and Mohamed Said Moussa
England	Peter Butler and Peter Wilcock
Finland	Juhani Hämäläinen and Harry Safonoff
France	Jean Garaïalde and Bernard Pascassio
Greece	George Guinis and George Sotiropoulos
Guatemala	Roberto Galindo and Hilario Polo
Hong Kong	
Indonesia	
Ireland	Jimmy Kinsella and Eddie Polland
Italy	Roberto Bernardini and Alberto Croce
Jamaica	Basil Campbell and Seymour Rose
Japan	Isao Aoki and Tōru Nakamura
Libya	Muftah Salem and Mohammed Salah Ziaani
Malaysia	Zainal Abidin Yusof and Jalal Deran
Mexico	Ramón Cruz and Victor Regalado
Morocco	Ben Rokya Ahmed Messoud and Fatmi Moussa
Netherlands	Jan Dorrestein and Bertus Van Mook
New Zealand	Dennis Clark and Simon Owen
Nigeria	Patrick Okpomu and Paul Osanebi
Norway	Westye Hoegh (a) and Johan Horn (a)
Peru	Bernabé Fajardo and David Montoya
Philippines	Ireneo Legaspi and Eleuterio Nival
Portugal	Fernando Rina and Joaquin Rodriques
Puerto Rico	David Jimenez and Jesús Rodríguez
Romania	Muntanu Dumitru and Paul Tomita
Scotland	David Huish and David Ingram
Singapore	Lim Kian Tiong and Lim Swee Chew
South Africa	Hugh Baiocchi and Gary Player
South Korea	Cho Tae-ho and Kim Seung-hack
Spain	Valentín Barrios and Angel Gallardo
Sweden	Bo Johansson and Jan Rosell
Switzerland	Bernard Cordonier and Ronald Tingley
Taiwan	Lu Liang-Huan and Hsieh Min-Nan
Thailand	Prandana Ngarmprom and Sukree Onsham
United States	Johnny Miller and Jack Nicklaus
Uruguay	Juan Dapiaggi and Carlos Sereda
Venezuela	Ramón Muñoz and Julián Santana
Wales	Craig Defoy and David Vaughan
West Germany	Gerhard Koenig and Toni Kugelmueller

(a) denotes amateur

== Scores ==
Team

Place	Country	Score	To par	Money (US$)
1	United States	142-133-145-138=558	−18	2,000
2	South Africa	140-144-139-141=564	−12	1,000
3	Taiwan	138-145-142-143=568	−8	800
T4	Argentina	137-143-152-150=582	+6	200
T4	Spain	142-146-149-145=582	+6	200
6	Japan	143-144-154-142=583	+7	
T7	Australia	147-150-144-145=586	+10	
T7	New Zealand	151-149-144-142=586	+10	
9	Ireland	147-147-148-146=588	+12	
10	Philippines	151-149-146-146=592	+16	
T11	England	152-145-149-147=593	+17	
T11	Thailand	140-149-152-152=593	+17	
T13	Belgium	146-156-149-145=596	+20	
T13	France	153-146-148-149=596	+20	
15	Italy	152-152-149-145=598	+22	
16	Wales	151-147-150-152=600	+24	
T17	Netherlands	149-152-152-148=601	+25	
T17	Puerto Rico	152-141-157-151=601	+25	
19	Scotland	148-148-149-157=602	+26	
20	South Korea	156-144-155-148=603	+27	
21	Venezuela	156-157-149-146=608	+32	
22	Austria	156- - -151 =609	+33	
T23	Chile	150- - -158=610	+34	
T23	Mexico	154- - -149=610	+34	
T23	Sweden	153-144-157-156=610	+34	
26	Colombia	154- - -149=611	+35	
27	Canada	159- - -150=612	+36	
28	Singapore	163-145-149-162=619	+43	
29	Jamaica	151- - -157=622	+46	
30	Norway	157-161-156-153=627	+51	
31	West Germany	154- - -162=629	+53	
32	Brazil	162- - - =631	+55	
33	Switzerland	159- - -160=633	+57	
34	Guatemala	159- - - =635	+59	
35	Portugal	164- - -158=638	+62	
36	Egypt	155- - -166=639	+63	
37	Dominican Republic	167- - -157 =640	+64	
38	Morocco	157- - - =642	+66	
39	Indonesia	162-157-161-166=646	+70	
T40	Hong Kong	162-159-162-165=648	+72	
T40	Peru	172- - - =648	+72	
T42	Denmark	168-162-161-161=652	+76	
T42	Finland	163-169-159-161=652	+76	
44	Nigeria	161- - - =654	+78	
45	Greece	164- - - =657	+81	
46	Malaysia	166-160-166-166=658	+82	
47	Uruguay	163- - - =659	+83	
48	Libya	179- - - =708	+132	
49	Romania	185- - - =728	+152	

International Trophy

Place	Player	Country	Score	To par	Money (US$)
1	Johnny Miller	United States	73-65-72-67=277	−11	1,000
2	Gary Player	South Africa	69-72-70-69=280	−8	500
T3	Jack Nicklaus	United States	69-68-73-71=281	−7	300
T3	Lu Liang-Huan	Taiwan	67-69-74-71=281	−7	300
T5	Hugh Baiocchi	South Africa	71-72-69-72=284	−4	
T5	Randall Vines	Australia	72-74-69-69=284	−4	
7	Eddie Polland	Ireland	71-74-70-70=285	−3	
T8	Isao Aoki	Japan	70-71-76-70=287	−1	
T8	Valentín Barrios	Spain	69-70-75-73=287	−1	
T8	Hsieh Min-Nan	Taiwan	71-76-68-72=287	−1	
