= Peter Wilcock =

English golfer (born 1945)

Personal information
- Full name: Peter Howard Wilcock
- Nationality: England
- Born: 18 November 1945 (age 80) Lancashire, England

Career
- Sport: Golf
- Status: Professional
- Former tour: European Tour
- Professional wins: 1

Best results in major championships
- Masters Tournament: DNP
- PGA Championship: DNP
- U.S. Open: DNP
- The Open Championship: T18: 1973

Peter Howard Wilcock (born 18 November 1945) is an English professional golfer. He won the Italian BP Open in 1972 and represented England in the 1973 World Cup. Wilcock is remembered for scoring a hole-in-one on two successive days in the 1974 Penfold Tournament. On the second day he holed out at the 133-yard 5th hole winning a saloon car worth nearly £2,000, providing that no other professional achieved the feat during the tournament. He took out an insurance policy against this eventuality and then holed out again on the third day, at the 176-yard 11th hole.

== Golf career ==
Wilcock showed promise as a young professional, finishing fourth in Lord Derby’s Under-23 Professional Tournament in 1968, scoring a course-record 69 in the final round. The following year he was again fourth in the under-25 Coca-Cola Young Professionals' Championship.

Wilcock was runner-up in the 1970 Daks Tournament at Wentworth, three shots behind Neil Coles. Wilcock scored 69 and 67 on the final day to take the £650 second prize. In April 1972 he won the Italian BP Open by 6 strokes.

Wilcock played on the European Tour from its start in 1972 until 1979. His best season was 1973. In May he reached the semi-final of the Benson & Hedges Match Play Championship, losing 4&3 to Neil Coles and then losing at the 19th hole to Hedley Muscroft in the third-place playoff. In June he was joint runner-up in the Martini International, tied with Dai Rees and a stroke behind Maurice Bembridge, winning £1,050. In July, Wilcock started with a 71 in the Open Championship, to be joint 5th after the first day and finished tied for 18th, his best result in the Open. The year ended with Wilcock being chosen to partner Peter Butler in the English team in the World Cup after the late withdrawal of Peter Oosterhuis.

Wilcock scored a hole-in-one on two successive days in the 1974 Penfold Tournament. On the second day he holed out at the 133-yard 5th hole winning a saloon car worth nearly £2,000, providing that no other professional achieved the feat during the tournament. Wilcock took out an insurance policy against this eventuality and then holed out again on the third day, at the 176-yard 11th hole. This was the first time a player had scored two holes-in-one in a European Tour event, a record equalled by Eamonn Darcy at the 1991 Fujitsu Mediterranean Open.

Wilcock was at the Warren Golf Centre in Stockport, the Trevose Golf & Country Club in Cornwall, before moving to Hemsted Forest Golf Club (now called Cranbrook Golf Club), near Cranbrook, Kent.

== Tournament wins (1) ==
- 1972 Italian BP Open

== Results in major championships ==
Tournament	1969	1970	1971	1972	1973	1974	1975	1976	1977	1978
The Open Championship	T42		CUT		T18	CUT	T47			CUT

Note: Wilcock only played in the Open Championship.

Did not play

CUT = missed the half-way cut (3rd round cut in 1974 Open Championship)
"T" = tied

== Team appearances ==
- World Cup (representing England): 1973
