= City of Cairns Open =

Australian golf tournament

The City of Cairns Open is a professional and amateur golf tournament. It was briefly part of the PGA Tour of Australia's calendar.

== History ==
The City of Cairns Open began in 1965. It is held at Cairns Golf Club in Cairns, Australia. In the late 1960s and early 1970s, the event was won by leading touring professionals, including Randall Vines and Vic Bennetts. In 1975, it became an amateur event. In 1983, The Sydney Morning Herald reported that Mark Nash won the event.

In recent years, the City of Cairns Open has evolved into a week-long event with four different tournaments. On Sunday, the first day of the event, the first tournament is held, a 4BBB Stableford for both men and women. The following two days a 36-hole women's tournament is held. On Wednesday, a men's team event is held. The event concludes with a 54-hole stroke play event for men.

== Winners ==
| Year | Winner | Ref |
|---|---|---|
| 1974 | (Australia) Randall Vines | |
| 1973 | (Australia) Bob Taylor | |
| 1972 | (Australia) Graeme Bell | |
| 1971 | (Australia) Vic Bennetts | |
| 1970 | (Australia) Tim Woolbank (Australia) John Donald | |
| 1969 | | |
| 1968 | | |
| 1967 | | |
| 1966 | (Australia) Randall Vines | |
