= David Galloway (golfer) =

Australian professional golfer (born 1951)

Personal information
- Nationality: Australia
- Born: 1 March 1951 (age 75) Canberra, Australia
- Spouse: Gillian Galloway nee Coady (1975–2018 – her death)
- Children: 3

Career
- Sport: Golf
- Turned professional: 1969
- Former tour: PGA Tour of Australasia
- Professional wins: 8

Number of wins by tour
- PGA Tour of Australasia: 3
- Other: 5

David Galloway (born 1 March 1951) is an Australian professional golfer. Galloway had much success in the mid-1970s, winning three official events on the PGA Tour of Australia. Though from Canberra, his career was strongly associated with South Australia. Galloway won his first two official tournaments in the state and finished runner-up at the 1974 and 1976 South Australian Open. Later in his career he has worked primarily as a golf coach and administrator in the state.

== Early life ==
Galloway grew up in Turner, a neighborhood within Canberra. He received media attention as early as the age of 14. Over the course of this age, he cut his handicap in more than half, from 27 to 13. Roughly a year a later, at the age of 15, his handicap was down to 5. In June 1967, at the age of 16, he shot a par round. Royal Canberra's club professional Ray Thomas noted at this time that he had "terrific potential."

== Amateur career ==
At the age of 16, Galloway started playing in elite local amateur events. In October 1967, Galloway won the Royal Canberra Golf Club's junior championship with a total of 316, defeating his nearest competitor by 11 strokes. In June 1968, he played for Royal Canberra's team in a junior pennant competition against another local club, Yowani Golf Club. Royal Canberra won easily and Galloway won his individual match, defeating Brian Wellsmore, 2 and 1. The following year, in July 1968, he and partner Rolf Hartley won a fourball event for best gross score, winning 2 up. In November 1968, Galloway played the Royal Canberra Golf Club Championship. Galloway opened with an 81 but then shot a second round 73, ultimately tying the best round in the tournament. He shot a 74 in the third round to stay in contention. In the final round, he had a chance to win but his "good shot to the 18th green" went into a bunker. He made bogey and finished one shot out of a playoff. His 305 total still won the junior championship by three shots.

== Professional career ==
As of January 1969, Galloway had turned professional. During this time he also started playing in weekly tournaments for assistant professionals. His first professional tournament was played at Royal Canberra in March 1969. Against 33 fellow assistants, Galloway finished in a tie for third with fellow Royal Canberra assistant Geoff Gorham, three back. Most of the tournaments were in Sydney, however, and traveling expenses prohibited him participating in most of them. However, according to John Hourigan of The Canberra Times, "he did play well in the few he did enter." In December 1969, he had a chance to win one of these tournaments. He shot a 77 (+5) over the first 18 holes to put himself in contention to win the 27 hole event. However, over the last 9 holes he shot 40 (+4) to lose to Craig Coulston by four shots. Coulston outshot Galloway by five over the final nine. In a December 1970 event, he finished runner-up to John Cooper, losing in a playoff.

In January 1971, he moved onto Cromer Golf Club in Sydney under the guidance of Jim Moran. Galloway, however, "did not like Sydney" and returned to Canberra after two months at Cromer. His old position at Royal Canberra had been filled but he got a job at Yowani Golf Club. By the middle of 1971, despite still living in Canberra, he was now able to be "a regular competitor" in the weekly Sydney events for assistant professionals. He won two events late in the year. In December 1971, he won again, tying Rod Callaghan for the victory.

Galloway decided to play the Australian circuit full-time in 1972 to determine if he was good enough to be a touring professional. One of his first tournaments was the Tasmanian Open. He made the cut. He then played the Forbes Open but missed the cut. Shortly thereafter, Galloway could not work as a touring professional for several months because of a "dispute between the Australian Golf Union and the Professional Golfers' Association." Around May the dispute was resolved and the circuit started again. During this era his best finish was a runner-up placing at the Queensland PGA Championship.

In 1973, he had much success on the circuit. In February, he finished in a tie for fifth at the Tasmanian Open, three back of Stewart Ginn, just one out of the runner-up slot. In September, he played in the West End Tournament in Victor Harbor, South Australia. He held a one stroke lead over Randall Vines entering the final round. Galloway opened with four straight birdies to create a big lead. However, in "threatening conditions" he bogeyed the 5th and 7th holes to come back to the field. After a birdie-bogey exchange with Vines on the 9th hole his lead suddenly returned to one. The remainder of the tournament would be a "two-way struggle" between the two men. Galloway, however, birdied the 14th to extend his lead. He won by two over Vines at 276.

Galloway played the 1974 South Australian Open. In "icy winds and rain" at Glenelg Golf Club, Galloway shot an even-par 72 during the third round, among the best of the day. He entered the final round tied with Randall Vines and Ray Hore at 215 (−1). Galloway shot one-over-par on Sunday's front nine but remained a "potential winner" as his top competitors shot the same score. After he bogeyed the 12th he was two behind Hore. After a "magnificent" eagle on the 13th, however, he was within one of the lead. Galloway ruined any chances of a comeback, though, with bogeys on the 16th and 17th holes. He finished runner-up with Vines at 288 (E), one behind champion Hore. A month later, Galloway had an erratic though notable performance at the Australian Open. During the front nine of the second round he fired six birdies to shoot 30 (−6). In addition, he "could easily have come in with a 28" if two of his other makable birdie putts fell. Nonetheless his excellent play put him near the leaders. Through 14 holes he remained −6 for the day. However, he bogeyed 15 and 16 for a 38 (+2) on the back nine. His round of 68 (−4) was still the joint third best of day, only one behind Vaughan Somers and Scotland's Norman Wood. However, Galloway was not among the leaders as the tournament concluded. The following week he played the Chrysler Classic, another event with a star-studded field. On the difficult Royal Melbourne layout he finished at 296 (+12) and in a tie for sixth. He defeated past or future major championships winners Peter Thomson, Tom Kite, and Hubert Green by multiple shots.

In early 1975, at Young Golf Club outside Sydney, Galloway played well at the inaugural Australian Four-Ball Championship. He and teammate Duncan Park were six behind the team of Bob Tuohy and Frank Phillips entering the final round. Led by Park's four consecutive birdies at the start, the team shot a final round 61 (−9) to tie the third round leaders as well as the team of Noel Ratcliffe and Rodger Davis. On the second playoff hole Park holed an eight-metre birdie putt for the win. However, other than this victory he had a lengthy "drought." He did not have many top performances and was not earning much money. By the end of the 1975 season he had "virtually decided" to stop working as a touring professional and "get a steady job." His father gave him some money to extend his career however.

Galloway would have much success in early 1976. In February, he played the South Australian Open, the site of one of his top performances. He did not hold the lead over the first three rounds but was "always close at hand." On Sunday he made a number of "excellent putts" on the front nine to surge forward. His outward nine 32 (−4) included four birdies and no bogeys. He took a two-stroke lead over Englishman Guy Wolstenholme. Galloway played poorly over the back nine, scoring five bogeys against one birdie. He stated afterwards, "I thought I'd blown the championship." However, Wolstenholme also shot a 40 (+4) on the back nine and finished two back. Frank Phillips was making a charge, however, and was three-under-par through the first 15 holes. All Phillips needed to do was par out to win. Instead, he finished bogey-par-double bogey to finish two behind Galloway. "It's unbelievable," Phillips said after the round. "I thought I had to make birdies on the last three holes to catch up." Galloway finished at 285 (−3) and defeated Wolstenholme and Phillips by two strokes. He earned $A2,000. The prize money helped him extend his career. The following week, he played the Forbes Open. Galloway shot an opening 68 (−4) to put himself one behind teenager Greg Hohnen going into Friday. He shot even-par for the remainder of the tournament and finish in solo seventh, four behind.

His success would continue through 1977. Early in the year he attempted to defend his South Australian title. In the final round, Galloway came from behind with a 68 (−5) to take the clubhouse lead. Noel Ratcliffe still had a chance to win outright on the final green. However, he missed a 3-metre putt putting him a playoff with Galloway. Both men finished at 287 (−5). The playoff began at the par-3 16th hole which was always was playing "into a severe crosswind." Ratcliffe's approach hooked into a pine tree but fortuitously bounced into a greenside bunker. Galloway's tee shot was short and in the rough. He pitched to six metres while Ratcliffe exploded to five metres. Galloway's par putt finished a "tantalizing three inches short." Ratcliffe then sank his par putt for the win. Shortly thereafter he won the South Australian PGA Championship, a local event held outside of Adelaide. In April he played excellently at the Royal Fremantle Open in Perth. Starting at 214 (−2) and several shots behind the lead, Galloway "came home strongly with a 68" to finish solo runner-up. In November, he opened the Australian Open one shot off of John Lister's lead with a 71 (−1). He stated after the round, "It's the best I've played since winning the South Australian PGA at Flagstaff Hill this year and I am very pleased." He faded over the final three rounds, however, and finished in a tie for 31st.

In April 1978 he challenged for the Western Australian Open. Galloway was well behind Ross Metherell after 63 holes. However, he played excellently on the back nine, scoring six birdies over seven holes to shoot a 30 and finish with a 67. He was the clubhouse leader at 279. Metherell still had a one shot lead with three holes left. However, he dropped two shots over the 70th and 71st holes. Needing a birdie to tie Galloway at the last, he instead double-bogeyed. Galloway defeated Metherell, Mike Ferguson, and Peter Croker by three shots. Several months later, in November, Galloway played excellently at the Australian Open. He opened the event with a 71 (−1) to place himself in a tie for fifth with Ben Crenshaw and Bill Rogers. By tournament's end he was in a tie for 6th place; Graham Marsh was the only Australian to score better. The year was later described as his "best year in tournament golf."

As of November 1977, Galloway was a club professional at Thaxted Park in Adelaide. He worked there for several years. During this era he worked concurrently as a touring professional. In 1979 he opened the South Australian Open with a 69 (−3) to place himself in joint third place. The following year he also played well during the opening round of the 1980 Australian Masters, shooting a 67 (−6), only one off Rodger Davis' lead, tying the old course record that Davis just broke. During most of his experience at Thaxted Park, however, Galloway did not achieve much media coverage for his golf play. He stated that it was difficult balancing work as a club professional and touring professional.

In early 1982, he began to receive more media attention. In February he once again opened the Australian Masters one off the lead. Also, early in the year, he won the South Australian State Qualifying tournament. It qualified him for the Australasian Club Golf Professional at Royal Canberra. He played with Gary Campbell, also of South Australia. Their team finished in a five-way tie for second, four behind Chris Tickner and John Ruggerio. In addition, he won the 1982 PGA South Australian Foursomes Championship with fellow club professional Phil Tierney.

By April 1982, he quit working at Thaxted Park in Adelaide. He had worked at the club for four and half years. His intention was to play the PGA Tour of Australia full-time. "I'm just beginning to hit the ball well again," he stated. Galloway, however, did not have many highlights on the PGA Tour of Australia in the 1980s. He did play in some notable pro-ams, winning the 1989 Victor Harbor pro-am. In the 1990s he mainly played in local South Australian events, including the South Australian PGA Championship. In 1994 he finished 5th on the South Australian Order of Merit.

Rather, Galloway worked primarily as a golf coach and administrator for the remainder of his regular career. In 1983 it was announced that Galloway would coach one side of a junior team competition. He would coach the youths from "the Hills district" of Adelaide and fellow pro Phil Tierney would coach the "Southern district." The goal was to sharpen the skills of young amateurs who had not yet had the opportunity to face stiff competition. In 1989, he was affiliated with Wirrina Cove Golf Club. As of 1995, Galloway was president of the South Australian PGA.

In 2001 Galloway started playing on the Australian Legends Tour. According to his estimation, he has won "five or six" events on tour. After a long layoff Galloway started playing on tour again in 2019. In addition, Galloway owns a golf driving range in Port Noarlunga, South Australia, where he offers lessons to those who want to better their game.

== Professional wins (6) ==
=== PGA Tour of Australasia wins (3) ===
No.	Date	Tournament	Winning score	Margin of victory	Runner(s)-up
1	23 Sep 1973	West End Tournament	−12 (68-68-71-69=276)	2 strokes	(Australia) Randall Vines
2	15 Feb 1976	South Australian Open	−3 (71-70-72-72=285)	2 strokes	(Australia) Frank Phillips, (England) Guy Wolstenholme
3	23 Apr 1978	Western Australian Open	−9 (73-69-70-67=279)	3 strokes	(Australia) Peter Croker, (Australia) Mike Ferguson, (Australia) Ross Metherell

PGA Tour of Australasia playoff record (0–1)

No.	Year	Tournament	Opponent	Result
1	1977	South Australian Open	(Australia) Noel Ratcliffe	Lost to birdie on first extra hole

=== Other wins (3) ===
- 1975 Australian Four-ball Championship (with Duncan Park)
- 1977 South Australian PGA Championship
- 1982 PGA South Australian Foursomes Championship (with Phil Tierney)
