= Traralgon Classic =

Golf tournament

The Traralgon Classic was a golf tournament in Australia. It was an event on the PGA Tour of Australia from 1978 to 1981. The event was held at Traralgon Golf Club in Traralgon, Victoria.

== History ==
Among Greg Norman's earliest victories were at the event. One of the more notable performances was Paul Foley's 1980 win. Foley, who started the final round several shots back at even par, shot an extraordinary final round of 62, 10-under-par. He beat the course record by two and defeated Wayne Grady by six shots.

== Winners ==
Year	Winner	Score	To par	Margin of victory	Runner(s)-up	Ref
Traralgon Classic
1981	(Australia) Ian Stanley	279	−9	3 strokes	(Australia) Garry Merrick	
1980	(Australia) Paul Foley	278	−10	6 strokes	(Australia) Wayne Grady	
1979	(Australia) Greg Norman	277	−11	3 strokes	(Australia) Glenn McCully (Australia) Ian Stanley	
Traralgon Loy Yang Classic
1978	(Australia) Greg Norman	277	−11	1 stroke	(Australia) Colin Bishop	
Ben Guzzardi – Total Golf Classic
1977	(United States) Marty Bohen	202	−11	1 stroke	(Australia) Rodger Davis (Australia) Noel Ratcliffe	

- 1976 Frank Phillips (36 hole pro-am)
