= Randall Vines =

Australian professional golfer (born 1945)

Personal information
- Nationality: Australia
- Born: 6 June 1945 (age 81)

Career
- Sport: Golf
- Partner: Robin
- Turned professional: 1966
- Current tours: PGA Tour of Australia; European Seniors Tour
- Professional wins: 16

Number of wins by tour
- PGA Tour of Australasia: 3
- Other: 12

Best results in major championships
- Masters Tournament: DNP
- PGA Championship: DNP
- U.S. Open: DNP
- The Open Championship: T25: 1971

Randall Vines (born 6 June 1945) is an Australian professional golfer. Vines was one of the top Australian golfers of his generation, winning a number of worldwide tournaments. He may be best remembered for his sterling 1968 season which included four significant worldwide wins across in Asia, Europe, and Australia, including a 17 stroke win at the Tasmanian Open. The victory is still considered by some to be the largest margin of victory in any golf significant professional tournament ever.

== Amateur career ==
Vines is from Brisbane, Australia. He had some success as an amateur, winning the 1963 Queensland Junior Golf Tournament.

== Professional career ==
Vines turned professional in 1966. He began his career playing pro-ams in northern Queensland. His first victory was at the City of Cairns Open. In late 1966 he posted his first top performance at a major event, finishing solo third at the North Coast Open.

In 1967 Vines traveled to play in Europe. Although he spent most of his career in Australia his first great successes were in Europe. Early in the 1967 season he finished runner-up at the Spanish Open. In the summer, he held the lead after the first round of the Open Championship qualifier. He went on to qualify for the event. Later in the year he played excellently at the Engadine Open in Switzerland. He held lead entering the final round and, though overtaken by Graham Henning, would still finish solo second. This success culminated in two victories in the late summer. Aided by a hole-in-one in the final round, Vines shot 272 (−20) to win the Swiss Open by two over Guy Wolstenholme. The following week Vines was victorious again, winning the Basque Coast Open at Biarritz Golf Club in southwest France.

Vines soon returned down under to play on the Australian circuit. In late January he played excellently at the Wagga City Open, nearly overcoming Walter Godfrey's four shot overnight lead. He finished second at −10, two back. The following week he recorded an astonishing performance at the Tasmanian Open, winning the tournament by 17 strokes. It was later noted by an Australian journalist that his performance stood "as the biggest victory margin in a tournament in the world." The experience in Tasmania was personally important to Vines as well, as he had his honeymoon with his newlywed wife Robin while on the island. She served as his caddie during the tournament.

Following the victory, Vines moved onto the Asia Golf Circuit. He quickly won a tournament in March, the Thailand Open. Vines thought he blew his chances with a final round 75 (+3) but leader Haruo Yasuda made double-bogey on the last giving Vines a one-stroke win. Vines won again the very next week at the Hong Kong Open. Two weeks later Vines also had a chance to win the last event of the circuit's 1968 schedule, the Yomiuri International. Tied for the lead Chen Ching-Po and Tomoo Ishii at the beginning of the final round, Vines had "trouble mastering the difficult windy conditions" and shot a disappointing 76 (+4). He still finished solo third in the event and second on the circuit's Order of Merit. Like the previous year Vines again played in Switzerland and record excellent results. This time he won the Engadine Open and nearly defended his 1967 Swiss Open title, losing to Italy's Roberto Bernardini in a playoff.

After all of this success, Vines had a lengthy dry spell. He recorded runner-up finishes at the 1968 Caltex Tournament, 1969 Tasmanian Open, 1970 North Coast Open, 1971 West End Tournament, and 1971 North Coast Open. However, other than at the Tasmanian Open, where he lost to Alan Murray by a shot, he never came particularly close to winning. He thought about quitting golf. He cited poor play, constant travel, and low pay. This period ended at the 1972 Australian PGA Championship. Vines outplayed playing partner Bill Dunk over the course of the final round to beat his own expectations and win by two shots. "It's the best golf I've played my entire life," he said.

Vines' played excellently through 1973. Once again he played well at the Tasmanian Open, finishing two back of Stewart Ginn, tying David Good and Ian Paul for second. In September, he finished runner-up at the West End Tournament, nearly overcoming overnight leader David Galloway. Shortly afterwards, he won an event in his home state, the Queensland PGA Championship. In November he played the Australian PGA Championship. Like the previous year, he again played excellently at the event, now contested as a match play event. Vines won his first five matches and played Stewart Ginn in the final. The match was neck and neck until Ginn made mistakes on the 16th and 17th ensuring Vines' victory. Vines shot −25 for the event. "I feel like I've won six tournaments," he stated at the end of the event. "Every match was a hard one." He also won the Cairns Open at the very end of the calendar year. This excellent play helped him qualify for the 1973 World Cup. Vines played well, finishing in a tie for fifth among 96 players, right behind Jack Nicklaus who tied for third.

Vines continued to have some success through the mid-1970s. In September 1974 he seriously competed at the South Australian Open. In "icy winds and rain" Vines shot a 70 (-2), the round of the day at Glenelg Golf Club, to tie for the third round lead with Ray Hore and David Galloway. All three remained tied after the final round's front nine after shooting one-over each. On the 10th Vines made bogey to fall one behind. He then merely parred the par-5 13th − which his competitors either birdied or eagled − seemingly ending his chances. However, on the par-5 18th hole the leader and his playing partner, Hore, got into trouble, taking four shots to reach the green. Vines birdied the hole but Hore managed to make bogey. At even-par 288, he won by a stroke over Vines and Galloway. The following year Vines won a 54-hole tournament at Mount Isa. Due to his recent good play he was among the "favoured players" at the Australian PGA Championship. He opened with a 73 (+2), however, to put him six behind the lead. Though he was at 218 (+5) after the third round he was in contention, only three back of Vic Bennetts' lead. In windy conditions on the final day, he shot a 74 (+3) but managed to finish in a tie for fifth, five back of champion Bennetts. In mid-October 1975 he was the "early tearaway pacemaker" at the North Coast Open. He opened with a 65 (−7) followed by a 66 (-6). Despite a third round 74 he still held a four stroke lead entering the final round. However, he shot a 40 (+4) on the front nine to lose the solo lead to Vaughan Somers. Vines poor play continued on the back nine "to throw all chance of victory." He settled for a 79 and a tie for fifth, five back of Somers. The following week he again placed high, finishing solo third at the New South Wales Open. Early in 1976 he finished runner-up at the Forbes tournament.

On 26 February 1976, he entered the Queanbeyan City Open. Vines was even par during the first 27 holes. Though "there was no indication of what was to come" at this point, Vines would play excellently on the back nine. His back nine started with a chip-in birdie on the 10th. On the 12th, despite missing the fairway, he holed out for an eagle. This was followed by three straight birdies. He missed a 30 centimeter putt on the 16th otherwise he would have had four birdies in a row. Nonetheless, he still shot a 28 (−7). After the round Vines stated it was the best nine holes of his career. It was the first time he had broken 30 and "gave him almost as big a thrill as his 1968 Tasmanian Open victory by 17 shots." Despite this excellent play he was one behind pro Mark Tapper. Vines remained one behind him entering the final round. Tapper, however, played poorly the entire round, presaged by a bogey on the opening hole. Vines took advantage of his poor play. Though he drove the ball extremely erratically, Vines hit extraordinary approaches from the rough or behind trees and the wrong fairway. This enabled him to make a number of birdies and he ultimately cruised to a four shot win.

During this era Vines started to work as a club professional at Helensvale Golf Course in Helensvale, Queensland. He still worked as a touring professional during the summer, however. Late in 1976 he won the Queensland PGA Championship for the second time. In November 1976, with a 64 (−8), he broke the course record at Victoria Golf Club during the third round of the Colgate Champion of Champions. This moved him within striking distance of the lead. However he shot a mediocre 74 in the final round to end up tied for thirteenth place with Rodger Davis and Tom Watson. The following year he attempted to defend his Queanbeyan City Open championship. After a very erratic opening round 71 (+1), which included a quadruple bogey on the 15th hole, he fired a second round 65 to get into contention. After a disappointing third round he shot a final round 67, the round of the day, and finished in a tie for fourth. On 10 November 1977, at the Australian PGA Championship, he opened with a disappointing 77 (+5), which included five 3-putts. He played excellently the following day, however, with a 64 (−8) to move into fourth place. His second round included three sets of three consecutive birdies. He would go on to finish in a tie for 8th. The following week he seriously contended for the Australian Open. Starting in the second round Vines shot consecutive rounds of 70 (−2) at The Australian to get within two shots of Don January's lead. However he would shoot a disappointing 78 in the final round to finish in a tie for eighth. Despite the weak finish it would be his best ever finish at his national open. Vines defeated star golfers Jack Nicklaus, Raymond Floyd, and Greg Norman by several shots.

In February 1978, Vines recorded his final win on the PGA Tour of Australasia. At the Griffith Golf Classic he opened with a 66 (−5) to share for the first round lead with Rob McNaughton. Vines shot an even-par 71 the following day to take the solo lead by one. He continued to hold the lead for most of the weekend but struggled down the stretch with a final round 72 (+1) to fall into a tie with Ian Stanley. In a "tense" sudden death playoff Stanley missed several makable putts to win and then, on the 5th playoff hole, bogeyed giving Vines the victory.

Shortly afterwards, Vines' career went downhill. He stated later in life that he "went cold" during this period and lost confidence.

As a senior, however, Vines had some success. Vines turned 50 in the middle of 1995 and quickly started playing on the European Seniors Tour. He had immediate success, recording a runner-up finish at his fifth event and finished 25th on the Order of Merit, despite playing a truncated season. The following year, his first full year on the senior tour, he continued with this success, recording three top-10s including a runner-up finish at the Motor City Seniors Classic. He finished 16th on the Order of Merit, his career best. The following season, he recorded two more top-10s but finished much further down the Order of Merit. He maintained at least part-time status on the European Seniors Tour for three more seasons but with little success. He also played senior events in Asia and Australia. In 2004 he had much success in Australia. He went on a stretch where he finished in the top ten in 9 of 10 events. He also won the Twin Waters Senior Pro-am that year. The following year he finished runner-up at the Asian Senior Masters to Stewart Ginn. Two years later, during the 2007-08 season, he won the New Zealand Senior PGA Championship at the age of 62. He said this was the highlight of his senior career.

== Awards and honors ==
In 2015, Vines was bestowed Life Membership in the Australian PGA.

== Personal life ==
In 1968, Vines married Robin. As of 1972, he lived in Surfers Paradise.

== Professional wins (16) ==
=== Asia Golf Circuit wins (2) ===
No.	Date	Tournament	Winning score	Margin of victory	Runner-up
1	17 Mar 1968	Thailand Open	−3 (70-71-69-75=285)	1 stroke	(Japan) Haruo Yasuda
2	24 Mar 1968	Hong Kong Open	−9 (67-68-66-70=271)	1 stroke	(Japan) Teruo Sugihara

=== PGA Tour of Australia wins (4) ===
No.	Date	Tournament	Winning score	Margin of victory	Runner-up
1	11 Nov 1973	Australian PGA Championship	2 and 1		(Australia) Stewart Ginn
2	18 Aug 1974	City of Cairns Open			
3	29 Feb 1976	Queanbeyan City Open	−11 (71-62-68-68=269)	4 strokes	(Australia) Mark Tapper
4	26 Feb 1978	Griffith Golf Classic	−4 (66-71-71-72=280)	Playoff	(Australia) Ian Stanley

PGA Tour of Australasia playoff record (1–0)

No.	Year	Tournament	Opponent	Result
1	1978	Griffith Golf Classic	(Australia) Ian Stanley	Won with par on fifth extra hole

=== Other wins (10) ===
- 1966 City of Cairns Open
- 1967 Swiss Open, Basque Coast Open
- 1968 Tasmanian Open, Engadine Open
- 1972 Australian PGA Championship
- 1973 Queensland PGA Championship
- 1975 Mount Isa tournament
- 1976 Queensland PGA Championship
- 2007-2008 New Zealand Senior PGA Championship

== Playoff record ==
New Zealand Golf Circuit playoff record (0–1)

No.	Year	Tournament	Opponents	Result
1	1969	Vonnel International	(Australia) Bill Dunk, (New Zealand) Terry Kendall, (New Zealand) John Lister	Lister won with birdie on second extra hole Kendall and Vines eliminated by par on first hole

== Results in major championships ==
Tournament	1967	1968	1969	1970	1971	1972
The Open Championship	CUT	CUT			T25	CUT

Note: Vines only played in the Open Championship

Did not play

CUT = missed the half-way cut (3rd round cut in 1972 Open Championship)
"T" = tied

== Team appearances ==
Amateur

- Australian Men's Interstate Teams Matches (representing Queensland): 1961, 1962

Professional

- World Cup (representing Australia): 1973
