= Barry Burgess =

Australian golfer

Barry Burgess (born 1945–46) is an Australian professional golfer.

== Amateur career ==
Burgess began his career as an assistant professional at Ashlar Golf Club in Colebee, New South Wales, a suburb of Sydney. He early success as an amateur, winning the amateur junior golf title at Pymble. He shot 77-73 to defeat Alan Snape by four shots. He was 17 years old. Four years later he won the 1967 ACT Amateur Golf Championship at Royal Canberra Golf Club. He defeated Kevin Donohoe and Gerald Focken by a stroke.

On 27 March 1970, Burgess played the ACT Amateur Fourball Championship with fellow scratch amateur Len Mason. The teammates played "flawless golf," birdieing the 5th, 6th, 11th, and 15th holes, and did not make a bogey. They defeated Mick O'Connor and Ray Wallace 4 up. On 6 July 1970 the New South Wales (NSW) team, of which he was part of, played excellently at a state golf championship. They defeated the Australian Capital Territory (ACT) team by one stroke, 236 to 237. Burgess' 77 was the best of all of the players. During this era Burgess also changed jobs. As of 1967, Burgess worked at Strathfield Golf Club and within three years had moved on to Bankstown Golf Club in Milperra, New South Wales. Like Ashlar, both clubs were located in suburban Sydney.

On 23 July 1970, Burgess played at the New South Wales Amateur. In the first round, Burgess shot a 70 (−2) to take the solo lead. Among the 126 players, Burgess was one of only three players to shoot under par. Burgess' excellent play in the stroke play portion of the tournament qualified him for the match play portion. In the quarterfinals he played a 36 hole match against Noel Ratcliffe. Burgess birdied four of the first six holes to build a big early lead against Ratcliffe and went on to win 7 & 6. He played Lance Mason in the semi-final. Mason took the early advantage with a 2 up lead after the first 18 holes. The final half of the match, however, was much more of a back and forth affair. After lunch, Burgess won 3 of the first 5 holes to take the lead. Mason regained the advantage on the 8th as Burgess three-putted. However, Burgess won the 11th and 12th for another exchange of the lead. He would ultimately win it 2 & 1. Burgess played Tony Gresham in the final. Burgess started well winning the first hole with a birdie and then the 2nd as Gresham failed to make par. Things thing began to unravel from there, however, and Gresham took the 18 hole lead. After lunch, on the 19th hole, Gresham avenged his opening hole loss with a birdie. He went 2 up. On the 11th hole, and 29th of the day, Gresham "clinched the match" with his 5th birdie of the day. He won 6 & 5.

== Professional career ==
In August 1970 Burgess was in the process of turning professional. By December his application had been approved and he had started working at Muirfield Golf Club in Sydney. Like all Australian apprentices of the era, Burgess was not allowed to earn money in professional events for a year.

By 1972 he was playing in leading professional events. One of his first highlights was at the 1972 City of Auckland Classic. He shot a 64 (−7) to win the pro-am by two shots, defeating a number of well-known players, including recent Masters champion George Archer and veteran Walter Godfrey. In September he was in contention for the Australian PGA Championship. Burgess was at a tie for seventh entering the final round at 218 (+5), three back of leader Vic Bennetts. A month later, in October, he shot a third round 67 (−5) to get into contention for the Wills Masters. He ultimately finished in a tie for third with American Bob Murphy, three back of champion David Graham.

In 1976, Burgess traveled to Europe to play a number of events. In the fourth event of the European calendar, he recorded a top-10 at the French Open. Burgess also qualified for and play in the 1976 Open Championship. He would make the cut. Overall, Burgess played in 11 European Tour events and made the cut in nine of them. Soon afterwards, he played in the 1976 South Coast Open held at Catalina Country Club in Batemans Bay, Australia. He was in contention starting the back nine and then birdied 10 and 14. Despite the good play he was unaware he had a chance to win until he reached the final hole. There he missed the green but hit a chip shot to 3 metres and made the clinching par putt. He defeated David Good and Ross Metherell by a shot. Greg Norman was also in the mix but did not come through down the stretch. It was Burgess' first major win in 6 years.

This excellent continued through early 1977. In February 1977, he put himself in a tie for third place with a score of 140 (−4) after the second round of the Victorian Open. He shot 71 (−1) in the third round to remain in 3rd. However, he struggled to keep up in the final round and finished outside the top 5. The following month, he played at the Queanbeyan City Open. He opened with a 68 (−2) to position himself in the top-10, four behind George Serhan. He then stormed into the lead with a second round 65 (−5) to take a two shot lead over Greg Norman. In the third round, with an even-par round of 70, he maintained his two shot lead over Norman. Through the first 12 holes, Burgess played bogey-free golf but his lead had been eliminated. Playing ahead, Norman made a number of early birdies and then birdied the par-3 13th. It was the first time all weekend he held a share of the lead. When Burgess arrived to the 13th his tee shot hit a bank and deflected off the green. It was a "tense" situation and Burgess thought his chances of winning might be over at this point. However he pitched to one-metre and made the par putt to remain tied. Three holes later, Burgess would birdie the par-5 16th, a hole that had already produced two eagles and one birdie for him that week, to regain the solo lead. After Norman made bogey on the 17th hole, Burgess strode to the final hole with a two shot advantage. Despite hitting his approach into a bunker he "unhesitatingly" hit his sand shot to one-metre, assuring par and the two shot win.

Later in the year, Burgess again would play in Europe. He played in only four events this time, however. Earlier in the year, he had already decided to play fewer events, citing excessive travel in 1976. During this time Burgess worked at Young Golf Club in Young, New South Wales.

In September 1978, he played the Wyong Open. He opened with a two-under-par 70 to take a one shot lead. Playing in difficult rainy conditions during the second round, Burgess shot an even-par 72 to maintain a one shot lead. He held the lead over Ted Ball and Ray Hore. The rain continued the following day as the third and final round was washed out. Burgess was granted the winner, collecting A$1,400 for the victory.

== Personal life ==
As of 1977, Burgess was married with two children.

== Amateur wins ==
- 1963 junior golf title at Pymble
- 1967 ACT Amateur Golf Championship
- 1970 ACT Amateur Fourball Championship (with Len Mason), State amateur golf title with New South Wales team

== Professional wins (3) ==
=== PGA Tour of Australasia wins (1) ===
No.	Date	Tournament	Winning score	Margin of victory	Runner-up
1	13 Mar 1977	Queanbeyan City Open	−9 (68-65-70-68=271)	2 strokes	(Australia) Greg Norman

=== Other wins (2) ===
- 1976 South Coast Open
- 1978 Wyong Open

== Team appearances ==
Amateur

- Sloan Morpeth Trophy (representing Australia): 1969 (winners)
- Australian Men's Interstate Teams Matches (representing New South Wales): 1967 (winners), 1968, 1969 (winners)
