= David Creamer =

British table tennis player and golfer

Personal information
- Nationality: England
- Born: 9 December 1942 (age 83) Perivale, Middlesex, England
- Height: 5 ft 6 in (168 cm)

Career
- Sport: Golf
- Turned professional: 1966
- Former tour: European Seniors Tour
- Professional wins: 1

Number of wins by tour
- European Senior Tour: 1

Best results in major championships
- Masters Tournament: DNP
- PGA Championship: DNP
- U.S. Open: DNP
- The Open Championship: CUT: 1980

David Creamer (born 9 December 1942) is a former international table tennis player and professional golfer from England.

== Table tennis career ==
Creamer represented England at the 1963 World Table Tennis Championships in the Swaythling Cup (men's team event) with Chester Barnes, Ian Harrison and Bryan Merrett. He also won an English National title in 1964, in the doubles with Johnny Leach.

== Golf career ==
Creamer turned professional in 1966. Until he reached 50, Creamer played little top-level golf. However, he qualified for the 1980 Open Championship at Muirfield where he missed the cut. He played regularly on the European Senior Tour from 1993 to 2007, competing in over 200 events. He was twice in the top 10 of the money list, in 1997 and 2000. Creamer won once, the Energis Senior Masters at Wentworth in 2000. He was a runner-up 6 times, including the PGA Seniors Championship in 1994 and the Lawrence Batley Seniors in 2002, where he lost in a playoff.

== Professional wins (1) ==
=== European Seniors Tour wins (1) ===
No.	Date	Tournament	Winning score	Margin of victory	Runner-up
1	6 Aug 2000	Energis Senior Masters	−8 (66-70-72=208)	1 stroke	(Australia) Ian Stanley

European Seniors Tour playoff record (0–1)

No.	Year	Tournament	Opponents	Result
1	2002	Lawrence Batley Seniors	(England) Neil Coles, (United States) Steve Stull	Coles won with par on third extra hole Stull eliminated by par on second hole

== Team appearances ==
- Diamondhead Cup (representing Great Britain and Ireland): 1974
- Praia d'El Rey European Cup: 1997 (winners)

== See also ==
- List of England players at the World Team Table Tennis Championships
