= Ian Stanley (golfer) =

Australian professional golfer

Personal information
- Full name: Ian Stanley
- Nationality: Australia
- Born: 14 November 1948 Melbourne, Victoria, Australia
- Died: 29 July 2018 (aged 69)
- Height: 1.80 m (5 ft 11 in)

Career
- Sport: Golf
- Turned professional: 1970
- Former tours: PGA Tour of Australasia; European Tour; European Seniors Tour
- Professional wins: 30

Number of wins by tour
- European Tour: 1
- PGA Tour of Australasia: 8
- PGA Tour Champions: 1
- European Senior Tour: 3
- Other: 23

Best results in major championships
- Masters Tournament: DNP
- PGA Championship: DNP
- U.S. Open: DNP
- The Open Championship: T30: 1986

Achievements and awards
- European Seniors Tour Order of Merit winner: 2001

Ian Stanley (14 November 1948 – 29 July 2018) was an Australian professional golfer.

== Early life ==
Stanley was born in Melbourne, Victoria. At the age of 14, he started playing at the old Amstel Golf Club which backed onto his parents' home in Ian Grove, Mount Waverley. In 1966, he won both the Club Championship and Junior Championship and, later in the same year, won the Victorian School Boys at Huntingdale Golf Club.

As Amstel was moving to a new site in Cranbourne, Stanley was asked to join Huntingdale. He honed his game under the apprenticeship of club professional Geoff Flanagan. In 1967, he won the Victorian Junior Championship at Huntingdale and in 1969, he went on to win both the Junior and Senior Club Championships (also played at Huntingdale). He followed this up with his second Victorian Junior Championship win all in the same year.

== Professional career ==
In 1970, Stanley served a three-year apprenticeship under the guidance of Geoff Flanagan. Stanley was a prolific tournament winner in Australasia from the mid-1970s through the early 1990s. He also spent seven years on the European Tour in the 1970s, where he was joint winner of the 1975 Martini International with Christy O'Connor Jnr, and finished inside the top-60 on the Order of Merit six times with a best end of season ranking of 27th in 1975.

From 1977 to 1978, Stanley worked with David Inglis in establishing the Australian Masters and obtaining sponsorships for the first tournament in 1979.

After the tragic accident which injured Jack Newton in July 1983, Stanley, with other businessmen, set up the Jack Newton Trust. Stanley travelled around Australia raising money through exhibitions and guest speaking engagements. This concluded with a sell-out sportsmen's night held at the Southern Cross Hotel in September 1983. In 1983, Stanley was approached by the PGA to take Newton's position on the board where Stanley tried to establish an Accident & Sickness policy for each player; this was voted down in the 1986 PGA annual meeting.

In the early 1990s, Stanley joined Australia's first pay TV sports channel, Premier Sports, commentating on European and American tournaments. This led to the highly rated Golf Show which is still successfully running on Fox Sports today.

After turning 50, Stanley joined the European Seniors Tour, and in 2001 he won the PGA Seniors Championship, then the Senior British Open on his way to topping the Order of Merit. In total, he has three wins on the European Seniors Tour.

On retiring from the Senior tour in 2004, Stanley joined golf design and architect firm Thomson Perrett, where his principal design stage was golf greens. Stanley also project managed courses in Australia and China. The main golf courses in Australia included Ballarat Golf Club, Sandhurst Golf Club, Silverwoods at Yarawonga, Mandalay Golf Club and Manly Golf Club, Sydney (greens and bunker designs).

== Personal life ==
Stanley was a director of not-for-profit organisation Tee Up for Kids, which raises money for underprivileged children in Victoria.

Stanley married his wife, Pam, in 1971. They had three daughters. Stanley died from cancer on 29 July 2018.

== Amateur wins ==
- 1966 Victorian Schoolboys' Champion
- 1967 Victorian Junior Champion
- 1969 Victorian Junior Champion

== Professional wins (30) ==
=== European Tour wins (1) ===
No.	Date	Tournament	Winning score	Margin of victory	Runner-up
1	14 Jun 1975	Martini International	−5 (71-72-69-67=279)	Shared title with (Republic of Ireland) Christy O'Connor Jnr	

=== PGA Tour of Australia wins (8) ===
No.	Date	Tournament	Winning score	Margin of victory	Runner(s)-up
1	28 Sep 1975	Queensland Open	+1 (74-71-70-66=281)	4 strokes	(Australia) Mike Ferguson
2	14 Oct 1979	Garden State Victorian PGA Championship	−2 (71-70-73-72=286)	Playoff	(Australia) Stewart Ginn
3	1 Feb 1981	Traralgon Classic	−9 (72-68-68-71=279)	3 strokes	(Australia) Garry Merrick
4	31 Oct 1982	Westpac Classic	−7 (69-67-77-72=285)	3 strokes	(Australia) Stewart Ginn
5	19 May 1985	National Panasonic Western Australian Open	−12 (63-72-75-66=276)	1 stroke	(Australia) Paul Foley
6	20 Oct 1985	National Panasonic New South Wales Open	−3 (68-67-73-73=281)	1 stroke	(Australia) Peter Senior, (Australia) Lyndsay Stephen
7	18 Dec 1988	Nissan-Mobil New Zealand Open	−11 (64-68-69-72=273)	3 strokes	(Australia) Mike Clayton
8	22 Oct 1989	Tattersall's Tasmanian Open	−1 (68-69-73-69=279)	Playoff	(Australia) Peter O'Malley

PGA Tour of Australia playoff record (2–3)

No.	Year	Tournament	Opponent(s)	Result
1	1974	Australian PGA Championship	(Australia) Bill Dunk	Lost 18 hole playoff; Dunk: −1 (71), Stanley: E (72)
2	1976	Tasmanian Open	(Australia) Stewart Ginn, (Australia) David Good, (Australia) Brian Jones	Good won with birdie on fifth extra hole Ginn and Stanley eliminated by par on first hole
3	1978	Griffith Golf Classic	(Australia) Randall Vines	Lost to par on fifth extra hole
4	1979	Garden State Victorian PGA Championship	(Australia) Stewart Ginn	Won with par on second extra hole
5	1989	Tattersall's Tasmanian Open	(Australia) Peter O'Malley	Won with birdie on first extra hole

=== Other Australasian wins (11) ===
- 1980 Wembley Classic, Geraldton Classic
- 1983 Hume Classic, Murray River Classic
- 1984 Murray River Classic, South Australian PGA Championship
- 1985 Geraldton Classic
- 1986 Murray River Classic
- 1987 South West Open
- 1992 Norfolk Island Classic, Victorian Open (non-tour event)

=== Other wins (5) ===
- 1975 New Britain Open (Papua New Guinea)
- 1976 South Seas Classic
- 1986 Fiji Open
- 1988 Fijian Hotel Classic
- 1990 Fijian Hotel Classic

=== Senior PGA Tour wins (1) ===
Legend
Senior major championships (1)
Other Senior PGA Tour (0)

No.	Date	Tournament	Winning score	Margin of victory	Runner-up
1	29 Jul 2001	Senior British Open	−6 (70-69-70-69=278)	Playoff	(New Zealand) Bob Charles

Senior PGA Tour playoff record (1–0)

No.	Year	Tournament	Opponent	Result
1	2001	Senior British Open	(New Zealand) Bob Charles	Won with par on first extra hole

=== European Seniors Tour wins (3) ===
Legend
Senior major championships (1)
Other European Seniors Tour (2)

No.	Date	Tournament	Winning score	Margin of victory	Runner(s)-up
1	2 Jul 2000	Coca-Cola Kaiser Karl European Trophy	−13 (66-69-68=203)	4 strokes	(England) Denis Durnian, (Japan) Seiji Ebihara
2	3 Jun 2001	De Vere PGA Seniors Championship	−10 (71-66-68-73=278)	2 strokes	(England) Maurice Bembridge
3	29 Jul 2001	Senior British Open	−6 (70-69-70-69=278)	Playoff	(New Zealand) Bob Charles

European Seniors Tour playoff record (1–0)

No.	Year	Tournament	Opponent	Result
1	2001	Senior British Open	(New Zealand) Bob Charles	Won with par on first extra hole

=== Other senior wins (2) ===
- 1998 Australian PGA Seniors Championship, Ipswich Senior Classic

== Results in major championships ==
Tournament	1972	1973	1974	1975	1976	1977	1978	1979
The Open Championship	CUT	CUT	T56	46	CUT	CUT	CUT	

Tournament	1980	1981	1982	1983	1984	1985	1986	1987	1988	1989
The Open Championship			CUT				T30			

Tournament	1990	1991	1992	1993	1994	1995	1996	1997	1998	1999
The Open Championship										

Tournament	2000	2001	2002
The Open Championship			CUT

Note: Stanley only played in The Open Championship.

Did not play

CUT = missed the half-way cut (3rd round cut in 1973, 1976 and 1977 Open Championships)
"T" = tied

== Senior major championships ==
=== Wins (1) ===
Year	Championship	Winning score	Margin	Runner-up
2001	Senior British Open	−6 (70-69-70-69=278)	Playoff^{1}	(New Zealand) Bob Charles

^{1}Defeated Charles with a par at the first hole of a sudden-death playoff.

== Team appearances ==
- World Cup (representing Australia): 1974, 1975
- UBS Warburg Cup (representing the Rest of the World): 2001
