= South African Masters =

Nashua Masters
Tournament information
- Location: Eastern Cape, South Africa
- Established: 1923
- Course: Wild Coast Sun Country Club
- Par: 70
- Length: 6,351 yards (5,807 m)
- Tour: Sunshine Tour
- Format: Stroke play
- Prize fund: R 1,200,000
- Month played: November
- Final year: 2011

Tournament record score
- Aggregate: 263 Darren Fichardt (2009)
- To par: −19 Desvonde Botes (1999)
- Score: 12 and 11 Bobby Locke (1939); 12 and 11 Philip Ritson (1953)

Final champion
- (South Africa) Shaun Norris
- Location in South Africa Location in Eastern Cape

The South African Masters was one of the most prestigious golf tournaments on the Sunshine Tour. It was last played in 2011. Before its discontinuation, it had a prize fund of 1.2 million rand and was held at the Wild Coast Sun Country Club on the KwaZulu-Natal border, South Africa.

== History ==
The tournament had its roots in the South African Professional Match Play Championship, the running of which was taken over by the PGA of South Africa in 1957. Under the sponsorship of Dunlop the event transitioned into a 72-hole stroke play event in 1960.

The first edition of the new Dunlop Masters, at Houghton Golf Club in 1960, was won by Gary Player with an aggregate score of 266, a record that stood for 44 years. Player's total was equalled in 1970 by John Fourie, the only amateur to claim the title. Andrew McLardy posted 264 at the Wild Coast resort in 2004 and Darren Fichardt holds the record of 263 set on the par-70 course in 2009.

The South African Masters, along with the South African Open and the South African PGA Championship formed the Triple Crown. Winning all three titles in the same season was a feat only achieved by Gary Player and Ernie Els.

== Winners ==
| Year | Winner | Score | To par | Margin of victory | Runner(s)-up | Ref. |
Nashua Masters
| 2011 | (South Africa) Shaun Norris | 271 | −9 | 1 stroke | (South Africa) Tyrone Mordt | |
| 2010 | (South Africa) Warren Abery (2) | 267 | −13 | 2 strokes | (South Africa) Oliver Bekker (South Africa) Branden Grace (South Africa) Alex Haindl | |
| 2009 | (South Africa) Darren Fichardt | 263 | −17 | 1 stroke | (Zimbabwe) Marc Cayeux | |
| 2008 | (Zimbabwe) Marc Cayeux | 268 | −12 | 2 strokes | (South Africa) Bradford Vaughan | |
| 2007 | (South Africa) Jean Hugo | 269 | −11 | Playoff | (South Africa) Titch Moore | |
| 2006 | (South Africa) Warren Abery | 265 | −15 | 2 strokes | (Scotland) Doug McGuigan | |
| 2005 | (South Africa) Richard Sterne | 269 | −11 | 1 stroke | (South Africa) Titch Moore (South Africa) Grant Muller | |
| 2004 | (South Africa) Andrew McLardy | 264 | −16 | 3 strokes | (South Africa) Desvonde Botes | |
2003: No tournament
| 2002 (Nov) | (South Africa) Hennie Otto | 279 | −1 | 1 stroke | (Republic of Ireland) Ciaran McMonagle (Republic of Ireland) Gavin McNeill (Zimbabwe) Mark McNulty (South Africa) Roger Wessels | |
| 2002 (Feb) | (England) Justin Rose | 265 | −15 | 1 stroke | (South Africa) Titch Moore | |
Nashua Nedtel Cellular Masters
| 2001 | (Zimbabwe) Mark McNulty (5) | 274 | −6 | 1 stroke | (South Africa) Retief Goosen (South Africa) Des Terblanche | |
South African Masters
2000: No tournament
| 1999 | (South Africa) Desvonde Botes | 269 | −19 | 1 stroke | (South Africa) Dean van Staden | |
1998: No tournament
San Lameer South African Masters
| 1997 | (Zimbabwe) Mark McNulty (4) | 276 | −12 | 4 strokes | (Brazil) Adilson da Silva | |
| 1996 | (South Africa) Wayne Westner | 280 | −8 | 3 strokes | (United States) Patrick Moore (South Africa) Warren Schutte (South Africa) Chris Williams | |
Telkom South African Masters
| 1995 | (United States) Scott Dunlap | 279 | −9 | Playoff | (Zimbabwe) Mark McNulty | |
| 1994 | (England) Chris Davison | 281 | −7 | 2 strokes | (United States) Bruce Vaughan | |
EVS South African Masters
| 1993 | (Zimbabwe) Tony Johnstone (2) | 275 | −13 | 1 stroke | (South Africa) Roger Wessels | |
| 1992 | (South Africa) Ernie Els | 275 | −13 | 1 stroke | (South Africa) Chris Williams | |
1991: No tournament
Twee Jonge Gezellen Masters
| 1990 | (South Africa) Fulton Allem | 276 | −12 | 2 strokes | (South Africa) Ian Palmer | |
| 1989 | (South Africa) Hugh Baiocchi | 281 | −7 | 1 stroke | (South Africa) Tertius Claassens (South Africa) Ernie Els (United States) Rick Hartmann | |
Safmarine South African Masters
| 1988 | (South Africa) John Bland | 275 | −13 | 3 strokes | (Zimbabwe) Tony Johnstone | |
| 1987 | (South Africa) David Frost | 273 | −15 | 3 strokes | (England) Denis Durnian | |
| 1986 | (Zimbabwe) Mark McNulty (3) | 270 | −18 | 4 strokes | (South Africa) Fulton Allem | |
| 1985 | (Zimbabwe) Mark McNulty (2) | 278 | −10 | 4 strokes | (South Africa) Fulton Allem (Canada) Frank Edmonds (South Africa) David Frost | |
| 1984 | (Zimbabwe) Tony Johnstone | 277 | −11 | 1 stroke | (South Africa) Fulton Allem | |
1983: No tournament
SAB South African Masters
| 1982 | (Zimbabwe) Mark McNulty | 275 | −13 | 2 strokes | (Zimbabwe) Denis Watson | |
| 1981 | (Zimbabwe) Nick Price | 281 | −7 | 4 strokes | (Zimbabwe) Mark McNulty | |
1980: No tournament
| 1979 | (South Africa) Gary Player (11) | 270 | −18 | 6 strokes | (Republic of Ireland) John O'Leary | |
Kronenbrau Masters
| 1978 | (South Africa) Dale Hayes | 275 | −13 | Playoff | (South Africa) Tienie Britz | |
1977: No tournament
Dunlop South African Masters
| 1976 (Nov) | (South Africa) Gary Player (10) | 270 | −10 | 4 strokes | (South Africa) Hugh Baiocchi (South Africa) Simon Hobday | |
| 1976 (Feb) | (South Africa) Gary Player (9) | 268 | −12 | 1 stroke | (South Africa) Cobie Legrange | |
| 1975 | (South Africa) John Fourie (2) | 199 (Note: Shortened to 54 holes due to weather.) | −11 | 1 stroke | (South Africa) Vin Baker (South Africa) Allan Henning | |
| 1974 | (South Africa) Gary Player (8) | 270 | −10 | Playoff | (South Africa) Bobby Cole | |
1973: No tournament
| 1972 (Dec) | (South Africa) Gary Player (7) | 268 | −12 | 1 stroke | (South Africa) Harold Henning | |
| 1972 (Jan) | (South Africa) Gary Player (6) | 267 | −17 | 3 strokes | (South Africa) Bobby Cole | |
| 1971 | (South Africa) Gary Player (5) | 269 | −11 | 2 strokes | (South Africa) Harold Henning | |
| 1970 | (South Africa) John Fourie (a) | 266 | −14 | 6 strokes | (South Africa) Gary Player | |
| 1969 | (South Africa) Bobby Cole | 280 | −16 | 6 strokes | (South Africa) Tienie Britz (Australia) Bob Tuohy | |
| 1968 | (South Africa) Allan Henning | 278 | | 6 strokes | (South Africa) Graham Henning (South Africa) Hugh Inggs (South Africa) Cobie Legrange (South Africa) Trevor Wilkes (South Africa) Terry Westbrook | |
| 1967 | (South Africa) Gary Player (4) | 279 | | 2 strokes | (South Africa) Cobie Legrange | |
| 1966 | (South Africa) Cedric Amm | 276 | | 4 strokes | (South Africa) Trevor Wilkes | |
| 1965 | (South Africa) Denis Hutchinson (3) | 281 | | | | |
| 1964 | (South Africa) Gary Player (3) | 285 | | | | |
| 1963 | (South Africa) Bruce Keyter | 291 | | 3 strokes | (South Africa) Hugh Inggs (South Africa) Eric Moore (South Africa) Terry Westbrook | |
| 1962 | (South Africa) Denis Hutchinson (2) | 280 | | | | |
| 1961 | (South Africa) Denis Hutchinson | 276 | | | (New Zealand) Bob Charles | |
| 1960 | (South Africa) Gary Player (2) | 266 | | 17 strokes | (South Africa) Retief Waltman | |
Dunlop South African Professional Match Play
| 1959 | (South Africa) Gary Player | 3 and 1 | | | (South Africa) Harold Henning | |
| 1958 | (Wales) Dai Rees | 3 and 2 | | | (England) Ken Bousfield | |
| 1957 | (England) John Jacobs | 2 and 1 | | | (South Africa) Gary Player | |
South African Professional Match Play Championship
| 1956 | (England) Ken Redford | 2 and 1 | | | (South Africa) Gary Player | |
| 1955 | (South Africa) Bobby Locke (7) | 7 and 6 | | | (South Africa) Brian Ellmore | |
| 1954 | (South Africa) Jock Verwey (3) | 11 and 9 | | | (South Africa) AN Thomas | |
| 1953 | (South Africa) Philip Ritson | 12 and 11 | | | (South Africa) AJ Bullock | |
| 1952 | (South Africa) Sid Brews (6) | 7 and 6 | | | (South Africa) Philip Ritson | |
| 1951 | (South Africa) Bobby Locke (6) | 4 and 3 | | | (Republic of Ireland) Harry Bradshaw | |
| 1950 | (South Africa) Bobby Locke (5) | 9 and 8 | | | (South Africa) MS Hart | |
| 1949 | (South Africa) Jock Verwey (2) | 5 and 4 | | | (South Africa) GS van Niekerk | |
| 1948 | (South Africa) Jock Verwey | 5 and 4 | | | (England) James Ockenden Jr. | |
| 1947 | (South Africa) Sandy Guthrie | 5 and 4 | | | (England) James Ockenden Jr. | |
| 1946 | (South Africa) Bobby Locke (4) | 10 and 9 | | | (South Africa) Sid Brews | |
1941–1945: No tournament due to World War II
| 1940 | (South Africa) Bobby Locke (3) | 11 and 9 | | | (England) Bert Elkin | |
| 1939 | (South Africa) Bobby Locke (2) | 12 and 11 | | | (South Africa) M Goldsmith | |
| 1938 | (South Africa) Bobby Locke | 4 and 3 | | | (South Africa) Sid Brews | |
| 1937 | (South Africa) John Robertson | 37 holes | | | (South Africa) AN Thomas | |
| 1936 | (South Africa) Sid Brews (5) | 9 and 7 | | | (South Africa) John Robertson | |
| 1935 | (South Africa) J De Beer | 5 and 4 | | | (South Africa) G Brews | |
| 1934 | (South Africa) Sid Brews (4) | 6 and 4 | | | (England) Bert Elkin | |
| 1933 | (South Africa) Sid Brews (3) | 6 and 5 | | | (South Africa) AN Thomas | |
| 1932 | (England) Charles McIlvenny (4) | 6 and 5 | | | (South Africa) Robert Grimsdell | |
| 1931 | (England) Charles McIlvenny (3) | 10 and 9 | | | (South Africa) Jock Brews | |
| 1930 | (South Africa) Arthur Tomsett | 37 holes | | | (England) Charles McIlvenny | |
| 1929 | (England) Charles McIlvenny (2) | 8 and 7 | | | (England) Robert Grimsdell | |
| 1928 | (South Africa) Sid Brews (2) | 2 and 1 | | | (South Africa) Jock Brews | |
| 1927 | (England) Charles McIlvenny | 3 and 1 | | | (South Africa) Robert Grimsdell | |
| 1926 | (South Africa) Sid Brews | 11 and 10 | | | (South Africa) G Brews | |
| 1925 | (South Africa) Jock Brews (2) | 3 and 2 | | | (South Africa) Robert Grimsdell | |
| 1924 | (South Africa) Jock Brews | 4 and 2 | | | (Scotland) Archie Tosh | |
| 1923 | (England) Bert Elkin | 4 and 3 | | | (Scotland) Jimmie Johnstone | |
