= South African PGA Championship =

Golf tournament

Telkom PGA Championship
Tournament information
- Location: St Francis Bay, South Africa
- Established: 1965
- Course: St Francis Links
- Par: 72
- Length: 7,192 yards (6,576 m)
- Tours: Sunshine Tour; European Tour
- Format: Stroke play
- Prize fund: R 3,000,000
- Month played: November

Tournament record score
- Aggregate: 259 David Frost (1994)
- To par: −28 Louis Oosthuizen (2008)

Current champion
- (South Africa) Louis Albertse

Location map
- Location in South Africa Location in the Eastern Cape

The South African PGA Championship is one of the most prestigious golf tournaments on the Sunshine Tour. It has most recently been played in November, with a prize fund of R 3,000,000. It is currently held at St Francis Links in St Francis Bay.

== History ==
The current South African PGA Championship was founded in 1965, largely thanks to Gary Player and Brian Henning. The inaugural event was held in February 1965 and was won by Harold Henning who beat Player by 3 strokes.

New sponsors in 1972 gave the championship a home at The Wanderers Golf Club where it remained until 1995, when it became the first tournament in South Africa to be co-sanctioned by the European Tour. The following year Alfred Dunhill took over from Lexington as title sponsors, breaking a 23-year association with the PGA.

Following the 1999 event, Dunhill decided to end their association with the South African PGA and create their own tournament, the Alfred Dunhill Championship, which also replaced the PGA Championship on the European calendar. As a result, there was no PGA Championship held in 2000, but the tournament returned to the Sunshine Tour the following year with a new sponsor. It is one of the richest sole-sanctioned events on the Sunshine Tour.

The South African PGA Championship, along with the South African Open and the South African Masters formed the Triple Crown of South African golf. Winning all three titles in the same season is a feat only achieved by Gary Player and Ernie Els.

== Winners ==
Year	Tour(s) (Note: AFR − Sunshine Tour; EUR − European Tour.)	Winner	Score	To par	Margin of victory	Runner(s)-up
Telkom PGA Championship
2026	AFR	(South Africa) Louis Albertse	261	−27	3 strokes	(South Africa) Kyle de Beer (South Africa) Samuel Simpson
Fitch & Leedes PGA Championship
2025	AFR	(South Africa) Deon Germishuys	274	−14	1 stroke	(South Africa) Hennie du Plessis (South Africa) Samuel Simpson
PGA Championship
2024	AFR	(South Africa) Pieter Moolman	273	−15	1 stroke	(South Africa) Barend Botha
2023	AFR	(South Africa) Rupert Kaminski	280	−8	1 stroke	(South Africa) Matthew Spacey
2022	AFR	(South Africa) George Coetzee (2)	273	−15	3 strokes	(South Africa) Casey Jarvis
2021	AFR	(South Africa) Dean Burmester	271	−17	2 strokes	(South Africa) Pieter Moolman
Eye of Africa PGA Championship
2020	AFR	(South Africa) Darren Fichardt	268	−20	Playoff	(Chile) Matías Calderón
2019	AFR	(South Africa) Louis de Jager	276	−12	Playoff	(South Africa) Trevor Fisher Jnr
2018	AFR	(Chile) Matías Calderón	271	−17	1 stroke	(South Africa) Combrinck Smit
2017	AFR	(South Africa) Erik van Rooyen	272	−16	Playoff	(South Africa) Dylan Frittelli (South Africa) Makhetha Mazibuko
2016	AFR	(South Africa) Jaco van Zyl (3)	268	−20	Playoff	(South Africa) Dean Burmester
Telkom Business PGA Championship
2015: No tournament
2014	AFR	(South Africa) Titch Moore	273	−15	Playoff	(South Africa) Ulrich van den Berg
Telkom PGA Championship
2013	AFR	(South Africa) Jaco van Zyl (2)	268	−20	1 stroke	(South Africa) Dylan Frittelli
2012	AFR	(South Africa) Keith Horne	269	−19	3 strokes	(South Africa) Jaco Ahlers (South Africa) Darren Fichardt (South Africa) Alex Haindl
2011	AFR	(South Africa) George Coetzee	261	−27	2 strokes	(South Africa) Neil Schietekat
2010	AFR	(South Africa) Michiel Bothma (2)	268	−20	1 stroke	(South Africa) George Coetzee
2009	AFR	(South Africa) Jaco van Zyl	270	−18	1 stroke	(Canada) Graham DeLaet (South Africa) Trevor Fisher Jnr
2008	AFR	(South Africa) Louis Oosthuizen (2)	260	−28	14 strokes	(South Africa) Hennie Otto
2007	AFR	(South Africa) Louis Oosthuizen	266	−22	1 stroke	(South Africa) Richard Sterne
2006	AFR	(France) Grégory Bourdy	267	−21	6 strokes	(South Africa) Thomas Aiken
2005	AFR	(South Africa) Warren Abery	273	−15	1 stroke	(South Africa) Charl Schwartzel (South Africa) Jaco van Zyl
2004	AFR	(South Africa) Warrick Druian	267	−21	5 strokes	(South Africa) Michiel Bothma (South Africa) Mark Murless
2003: No tournament
2002 (Dec)	AFR	(South Africa) Michiel Bothma	273	−15	Playoff	(South Africa) Mark Murless
2002 (Jan)	AFR	(South Africa) Chris Williams (2)	271	−17	2 strokes	(South Africa) Hennie Otto
South African PGA Championship
2001	AFR	(South Africa) Deane Pappas	269	−19	3 strokes	(South Africa) Don Gammon
2000: No tournament
Alfred Dunhill South African PGA Championship
1999	AFR, EUR	(South Africa) Ernie Els (3)	273	−15	4 strokes	(South Africa) Richard Kaplan
1998	AFR, EUR	(Zimbabwe) Tony Johnstone (2)	271	−17	2 strokes	(South Africa) Ernie Els
1997	AFR, EUR	(Zimbabwe) Nick Price	269	−19	Playoff	(South Africa) David Frost
1996	AFR, EUR	(Germany) Sven Strüver	202 (Note: Shortened to 54 holes due to rain.)	−14	3 strokes	(South Africa) Ernie Els (Northern Ireland) David Feherty
Lexington South African PGA Championship
1995	AFR, EUR	(South Africa) Ernie Els (2)	271	−9	2 strokes	(South Africa) Roger Wessels
Lexington PGA Championship
1994	AFR	(South Africa) David Frost	259	−21	7 strokes	(Zimbabwe) Nick Price
1993	AFR	(Zimbabwe) Mark McNulty	265	−15	1 stroke	(South Africa) John Bland (South Africa) David Frost (Zimbabwe) Nick Price (South Africa) Wayne Westner
1992	AFR	(South Africa) Ernie Els	271	−9	1 stroke	(South Africa) Ian Palmer (South Africa) Kevin Stone (South Africa) Wayne Westner
1991	AFR	(South Africa) Roger Wessels	271	−9	Playoff	(England) Mark James (United States) Hugh Royer III
1990	AFR	(South Africa) Fulton Allem (2)	266	−14	2 strokes	(England) Chris Davison
1989	AFR	(Zimbabwe) Tony Johnstone	269	−11	Playoff	(South Africa) Chris Williams
1988	AFR	(Northern Ireland) David Feherty	267	−13	1 stroke	(Republic of Ireland) Eamonn Darcy
1987	AFR	(South Africa) Fulton Allem	268	−12	2 strokes	(South Africa) Hugh Baiocchi
1986	AFR	(South Africa) Bobby Cole	265	−15	5 strokes	(South Africa) David Frost (Zimbabwe) Teddy Webber
1985	AFR	(South Africa) Chris Williams	272	−8	1 stroke	(Zimbabwe) Mark McNulty (United States) Jay Townsend (Zimbabwe) Denis Watson
1984	AFR	(South Africa) Gavan Levenson	271	−9	3 strokes	(Zimbabwe) Nick Price
1983	AFR	(United States) Corey Pavin	270	−10	1 stroke	(Zimbabwe) Nick Price
1982	AFR	(South Africa) Gary Player (3)	272	−8	3 strokes	(Scotland) Gordon Brand Jnr (Zimbabwe) Mark McNulty (United States) Bill Rogers
1981: No tournament
1980	AFR	(South Africa) Hugh Baiocchi	268	−12	1 stroke	(Zimbabwe) Mark McNulty (South Africa) Gary Player
1979	AFR	(South Africa) Gary Player (2)	203	−7	1 stroke	(South Africa) Bobby Cole (South Africa) Harold Henning (Zimbabwe Rhodesia) Nick Price (Zimbabwe Rhodesia) Denis Watson
1978	AFR	(United States) Hale Irwin	275	−9	1 stroke	(South Africa) Hugh Baiocchi (Rhodesia) Mark McNulty (South Africa) Robbie Stewart
1977	AFR	(South Africa) John Bland	275	−5	2 strokes	(South Africa) Gary Player
Sportsman Lager PGA Championship
1976	AFR	(South Africa) Dale Hayes (3)	266	−14	1 stroke	(South Africa) Gary Player
Beck's PGA Championship
1975	AFR	(South Africa) Dale Hayes (2)	266	−14	6 strokes	(South Africa) Allan Henning
1974	AFR	(South Africa) Dale Hayes	271	−9	1 stroke	(South Africa) Gary Player
Luyt Lager PGA Championship
1973	AFR	(United States) Tom Weiskopf	273	−7	3 strokes	(South Africa) Vin Baker
1972	AFR	(South Africa) Harold Henning (4)	279	−1	1 stroke	(South Africa) Hugh Baiocchi
1971 (Nov)	AFR	(South Africa) Tienie Britz (2)	280	−8	Playoff	(Rhodesia) Don Gammon (England) Peter Oosterhuis
South African PGA Championship
1971 (Feb)		(South Africa) Tienie Britz	277			
1970		(South Africa) Denis Hutchinson	278			
1969		(South Africa) Gary Player	272			
1968: No tournament
1967		(South Africa) Harold Henning (3)	275			
1966		(South Africa) Harold Henning (2)	272			
1965		(South Africa) Harold Henning	281			
