= Fulton Allem =

South African professional golfer (born 1957)

Personal information
- Full name: Fulton Peter Allem
- Nationality: South Africa
- Born: 15 September 1957 (age 69) Kroonstad, South Africa
- Height: 5 ft 11 in (1.80 m)
- Weight: 215 lb (98 kg; 15.4 st)

Career
- Sport: Golf
- Turned professional: 1976
- Current tour: Champions Tour
- Former tours: PGA Tour; Sunshine Tour
- Professional wins: 15
- Highest ranking: 52 (27 February 1994)

Number of wins by tour
- PGA Tour: 3
- Sunshine Tour: 10
- Other: 2

Best results in major championships
- Masters Tournament: T38: 1994
- PGA Championship: T31: 1993
- U.S. Open: T33: 1994
- The Open Championship: T44: 1987, 1991

Fulton Peter Allem (born 15 September 1957) is a South African professional golfer.

== Early life ==
Allem was born in Kroonstad, Orange Free State, South Africa, the middle child of five children and the grandson of a Lebanese trader; he had a privileged upbringing. By the time he came into the world, his family had the largest corn farm in the Southern Hemisphere and the only privately owned grain silos in South Africa. Allem started playing golf at the age of 7 with encouragement from his father. Gary Player, a close family friend, also had a large influence on his early career.

== Professional career ==
Allem did not attend college and turned pro in 1976. He spent the early part of his career playing mostly in South Africa. He won 11 times on the Sunshine Tour between 1985 and 1991. A second-place finish in the 1987 NEC World Series of Golf convinced him to join the PGA Tour. Allem's first win on the PGA Tour was at the 1991 Independent Insurance Agent Open.

In 1993, he won twice on the PGA Tour and finished ninth on the money list. He won the Southwestern Bell Colonial and NEC World Series of Golf that year, two of the Tour's most prestigious non-majors.

Since his big year in 1993, Allem has been plagued by a host of medical ailments. In 1994, he suffered a herniated disc in his lower back. In 1998, he developed pericarditis, a potentially fatal inflammation of the sack surrounding the heart. In 2003, there were problems with vertebrae in his cervical spine. He has also suffered multiple heart attacks. These conditions have limited his playing time and adversely affected his play.

Allem began play on the Champions Tour in late 2007 after reaching the age of 50. He recorded three T2 finishes during his first two full seasons.

He has appeared on Fore Inventors Only on The Golf Channel.

== Personal life ==
Allem lives in Central Florida with his wife, Jennifer and their four children. He is sometimes known by the nickname "Fulty", particularly by the other South African players. His youngest brother is the interior designer Charles Allem, Principal of CAD International based in Miami.

== Professional wins (15) ==
=== PGA Tour wins (3) ===
No.	Date	Tournament	Winning score	Margin of victory	Runner(s)-up
1	26 Oct 1991	Independent Insurance Agent Open	−15 (71-69-67-66=273)	1 stroke	(United States) Billy Ray Brown, (United States) Mike Hulbert, (United States) Tom Kite
2	30 May 1993	Southwestern Bell Colonial	−16 (66-63-68-67=264)	1 stroke	(Australia) Greg Norman
3	29 Aug 1993	NEC World Series of Golf	−10 (68-68-72-62=270)	5 strokes	(United States) Jim Gallagher Jr., (Zimbabwe) Nick Price, (United States) Craig Stadler

=== Southern Africa Tour wins (10) ===
No.	Date	Tournament	Winning score	Margin of victory	Runner(s)-up
1	15 Feb 1986	AECI Charity Classic	−22 (70-63-66-67=266)	1 stroke	(Zimbabwe) Mark McNulty
2	1 Mar 1986	Palabora Classic	−18 (69-67-69-65=270)	3 strokes	(South Africa) Hugh Baiocchi
3	11 Jan 1987	Palabora Classic (2)	−17 (67-73-66-65=271)	1 stroke	(South Africa) Hugh Baiocchi
4	25 Jan 1987	Lexington PGA Championship	−12 (65-67-68-68=268)	2 strokes	(South Africa) Hugh Baiocchi
5	9 Jan 1988	Palabora Classic (3)	−11 (70-70-70-67=277)	4 strokes	(Northern Ireland) David Feherty, (Scotland) Ian Young
6	24 Nov 1989	Minolta Copiers Match Play	−3 (69)	19 holes	(South Africa) John Bland
7	20 Jan 1990	Lexington PGA Championship (2)	−14 (61-71-67-67=266)	2 strokes	(England) Chris Davison
8	24 Nov 1990	Twee Jonge Gezellen Masters	−12 (69-69-68-70=276)	2 strokes	(South Africa) Ian Palmer
9	22 Dec 1990	Goodyear Classic	−11 (72-69-68-68=277)	2 strokes	(South Africa) John Bland
10	16 Jan 1991	ICL International	−17 (69-67-64-71=271)	3 strokes	(South Africa) Gavan Levenson, (South Africa) Ashley Roestoff, (South Africa) Wayne Westner

Southern Africa Tour playoff record (0–2)

No.	Year	Tournament	Opponent	Result
1	1986	Swazi Sun Pro-Am	(Zimbabwe) Mark McNulty	Lost to par on first extra hole
2	1987	Southern Suns South African Open	(Zimbabwe) Mark McNulty	Lost to par on second extra hole

=== Other South African wins (1) ===
- 1986 Minolta Match Play Championship

=== Other wins (1) ===
No.	Date	Tournament	Winning score	Margin of victory	Runner-up
1	4 Dec 1988	Nedbank Million Dollar Challenge	−10 (72-71-66-69=278)	1 stroke	(United States) Don Pooley

== Results in major championships ==
Tournament	1986	1987	1988	1989	1990	1991	1992	1993	1994	1995
Masters Tournament							T52		T38	
U.S. Open						CUT		T52	T33	CUT
The Open Championship	CUT	T44				T44		CUT	CUT	
PGA Championship			CUT	CUT			T40	T31	T47	

Did not play

CUT = missed the half-way cut
"T" = tied

== Results in The Players Championship ==
Tournament	1988	1989	1990	1991	1992	1993	1994	1995	1996	1997	1998	1999	2000	2001	2002	2003
The Players Championship	T3	T14	T11	CUT	CUT	T20	T55	CUT	CUT	CUT	CUT	T77	T66	CUT	CUT	CUT

Top 10

CUT = missed the halfway cut
"T" indicates a tie for a place

== Results in senior major championships ==
Tournament	2008	2009	2010	2011	2012
Senior PGA Championship		CUT	CUT		
The Tradition		T57	T21		T38
Senior Players Championship	T18	T41	T57		
U.S. Senior Open		T36			T53
Senior British Open Championship		T32			

Did not play

CUT = missed the halfway cut
"T" indicates a tie for a place

== Team appearances ==
This list may be incomplete.

- Dunhill Cup (representing South Africa): 1993
- Presidents Cup (International team): 1994
- Alfred Dunhill Challenge (representing Southern Africa): 1995 (winners)
