= 1984–85 Southern Africa Tour =

Golf tour season

1984–85 Southern Africa Tour season
- Duration: 12 December 1984 – 17 March 1985
- Number of official events: 10
- Most wins: (Zimbabwe) Mark McNulty (2)
- Order of Merit: (Zimbabwe) Mark McNulty

The 1984–85 Southern Africa Tour was the 14th season of the Southern Africa Tour, the main professional golf tour in South Africa since it was formed in 1971.

== Season outline ==
A variety of golfers from South Africa and Zimbabwe had success at the beginning of the season. At the first event, Safmarine South African Masters, Tony Johnstone defeated Fulton Allem in a playoff. At the second event, the Goodyear Classic, John Bland birdied the final four holes of regulation and the first playoff hole to defeat Nick Price. Price, however, won the following week at the ICL International. Chris Williams and Gavan Levenson won the next two events.

The remainder of the season was dominated by Mark McNulty. At the Swazi Sun Pro-Am he holed a 25 foot birdie putt on the final hole to defeat Simon Hobday by one shot. The following week, at the AECI Charity Classic, Paul Way was victorious by five strokes. The following week, at the Palaboro Classic, McNulty won in a playoff over Hugh Baiocchi. McNulty would go to win the Order of Merit.

== Schedule ==
The following table lists official events during the 1984–85 season.

Date	Tournament	Location	Purse (R)	Winner (Note: The number in brackets after each winner's name is the number of Southern Africa Tour events they had won up to and including that tournament. This information is only shown for Southern Africa Tour members.)	Notes
15 Dec	Safmarine South African Masters	Cape	100,000	(Zimbabwe) Tony Johnstone (3)	
22 Dec	Goodyear Classic	Transvaal	100,000	(South Africa) John Bland (9)	New tournament
12 Jan	ICL International	Transvaal	80,000	(Zimbabwe) Nick Price (4)	
19 Jan	Lexington PGA Championship	Transvaal	110,000	(South Africa) Chris Williams (1)	
26 Jan	South African Open	Natal	100,000	(South Africa) Gavan Levenson (3)	
2 Feb	Swazi Sun Pro-Am	Swaziland	80,000	(Zimbabwe) Mark McNulty (8)	Pro-Am
9 Feb	AECI Charity Classic	Transvaal	80,000	(England) Paul Way (1)	New tournament
23 Feb	Palabora Classic	Transvaal	100,000	(Zimbabwe) Mark McNulty (9)	New tournament
2 Mar	Trustbank Tournament of Champions	Transvaal	100,000	(South Africa) Simon Hobday (5)	New tournament
17 Mar	Wild Coast Classic	Cape	100,000	(South Africa) Ian Palmer (1)	

=== Unofficial events ===
The following events were sanctioned by the Southern Africa Tour, but did not carry official money, nor were wins official.

Date	Tournament	Location	Purse (R)	Winner	Notes
9 Dec	Nedbank Million Dollar Challenge	Transvaal	US$1,000,000	(Spain) Seve Ballesteros	Limited-field event

== Order of Merit ==
The Order of Merit was based on prize money won during the season, calculated in South African rand.

Position	Player	Prize money (R)
1	(Zimbabwe) Mark McNulty	57,750
2	(South Africa) Simon Hobday	42,040
3	John Bland	37,586
4	(South Africa) Gavan Levenson	32,792
5	(South Africa) Phil Simmons	28,977
