= 1986–87 Southern Africa Tour =

Golf tour season

1986–87 Southern Africa Tour season
- Duration: 20 November 1986 – 28 February 1987
- Number of official events: 11
- Most wins: (Zimbabwe) Mark McNulty (7)
- Order of Merit: (Zimbabwe) Mark McNulty

The 1986–87 Southern Africa Tour was the 16th season of the Southern Africa Tour, the main professional golf tour in South Africa since it was formed in 1971.

== Season outline ==
The season was dominated by Mark McNulty who had one of the best seasons in the history of the Southern African Tour. McNulty won the first three official tournaments as well as the unofficial Nedbank Million Dollar Challenge. Fulton Allem briefly overtook him on the Order of Merit standings with two victories in the middle of the season. However, McNulty won the final four events to secure the Order of Merit title for the third consecutive year.

Zimbabwe's Mark McNulty was looking to win the Order of Merit for the third consecutive season and had much success at the beginning of the season. According to The Daily Telegraph, he was the "clear favourite" to win the inaugural event, the Helix Wild Coast Sun Classic. McNulty indeed won the event, scoring a final round 66 to defeat John Bland by two shots. He also won the following week at the Germiston Centenary Tournament, defeating runner-up Fulton Allem. Days later he began play at the Nedbank Million Dollar Challenge, an unofficial event. McNulty won again, this time by two strokes over Lanny Wadkins. He earned $300,000. McNulty won the next official event on tour, the Safmarine South African Masters. It was his fifth win in a row going back to his last event on the European Tour.

During the middle of the season, Tony Johnstone and Fulton Allem had much success, alternating between wins. Johnstone won the fourth event of the year, the Goodyear Classic by one over Allem. Allem, however, came back and won the next event, the Palabora Classic, to take the lead on the Order of Merit. Johnstone went on to win the following week at the ICL International by a wide margin. Allem then won the subsequent event, the Lexington PGA Championship, by four strokes.

McNulty dominated the remainder of the season, winning the final four tournaments. At the eighth event, the Southern Suns South African Open, McNulty defeated Allem in a playoff. McNulty also won the following week at the AECI Charity Classic, again in a playoff, this time defeating Wayne Westner. It was his fifth win of the season. At the penultimate event, the Royal Swazi Sun Pro-Am, McNulty recorded 30 birdies to finish at 259 (−29) and win easily. He regained the lead on the Order of Merit over Allem. McNulty then won the final event of the season, the Trustbank Tournament of Champions. This secured the Order of Merit title.

== Schedule ==
The following table lists official events during the 1986–87 season.

| Date | Tournament | Location | Purse (R) | Winner (Note: The number in brackets after each winner's name is the number of Southern Africa Tour events they had won up to and including that tournament. This information is only shown for Southern Africa Tour members.) | OWGR points | Notes |
|---|---|---|---|---|---|---|
| 23 Nov | Helix Wild Coast Sun Classic | Cape | 100,000 | (Zimbabwe) Mark McNulty (15) | 10 | |
| 29 Nov | Germiston Centenary Tournament | Transvaal | 100,000 | (Zimbabwe) Mark McNulty (16) | 10 | New tournament |
| 13 Dec | Safmarine South African Masters | Cape | 110,000 | (Zimbabwe) Mark McNulty (17) | 20 | |
| 21 Dec | Goodyear Classic | Transvaal | 120,000 | (Zimbabwe) Tony Johnstone (4) | 10 | |
| 10 Jan | Palabora Classic | Transvaal | 140,000 | (South Africa) Fulton Allem (3) | 10 | |
| 17 Jan | ICL International | Transvaal | 120,000 | (Zimbabwe) Tony Johnstone (5) | 10 | |
| 24 Jan | Lexington PGA Championship | Transvaal | 120,000 | (South Africa) Fulton Allem (4) | 10 | |
| 7 Feb | Southern Suns South African Open | Cape | 100,000 | (Zimbabwe) Mark McNulty (18) | 16 | |
| 14 Feb | AECI Charity Classic | Transvaal | 100,000 | (Zimbabwe) Mark McNulty (19) | 10 | |
| 22 Feb | Royal Swazi Sun Pro-Am | Swaziland | 100,000 | (Zimbabwe) Mark McNulty (20) | 10 | Pro-Am |
| 28 Feb | Trustbank Tournament of Champions | Transvaal | 150,000 | (Zimbabwe) Mark McNulty (21) | 10 | Tour Championship |

=== Unofficial events ===
The following events were sanctioned by the Southern Africa Tour, but did not carry official money, nor were wins official.

| Date | Tournament | Location | Purse (R) | Winner | OWGR points | Notes |
|---|---|---|---|---|---|---|
| 7 Dec | Nedbank Million Dollar Challenge | Transvaal | US$1,000,000 | (Zimbabwe) Mark McNulty | 14 | Limited-field event |

== Order of Merit ==
The Order of Merit was based on prize money won during the season, calculated in South African rand.

| Position | Player | Prize money (R) |
|---|---|---|
| 1 | (Zimbabwe) Mark McNulty | 134,690 |
| 2 | (South Africa) Fulton Allem | 105,249 |
| 3 | (Zimbabwe) Tony Johnstone | 56,417 |
| 4 | (South Africa) Hugh Baiocchi | 56,124 |
| 5 | (South Africa) John Bland | 47,306 |
