= Mark McNulty =

Irish/Zimbabwean professional golfer (born 1953)

Personal information
- Full name: Mark William McNulty
- Nickname: Supermac
- Nationality: Rhodesia (until 1978); Southern Rhodesia (1979–1980); Zimbabwe (1980–2002); Ireland (2003–)
- Born: 24 March 1953 (age 73) Bindura, Southern Rhodesia
- Height: 5 ft 10 in (1.78 m)
- Weight: 160 lb (73 kg; 11 st)
- Spouse: Allison McNulty
- Children: 2

Career
- Sport: Golf
- Turned professional: 1977
- Current tour: PGA Tour Champions
- Former tours: PGA Tour; European Tour; Asia Golf Circuit; Sunshine Tour
- Professional wins: 59
- Highest ranking: 6 (18 October 1987)

Number of wins by tour
- European Tour: 16
- Sunshine Tour: 33
- Challenge Tour: 1
- PGA Tour Champions: 8
- Other: 3

Best results in major championships
- Masters Tournament: T16: 1988
- PGA Championship: T8: 1990
- U.S. Open: T17: 1988
- The Open Championship: T2: 1990

Achievements and awards
- Sunshine Tour Order of Merit Winner: 1980–81, 1981–82, 1984–85, 1985–86, 1986–87, 1992–93, 1997–98, 2000–01
- Champions Tour Rookie of the Year: 2004
- Champions Tour Byron Nelson Award: 2005

Mark William McNulty (born 24 March 1953) is a Rhodesian-born professional golfer who has represented Ireland for much of his career. He was one of the leading players on the European Tour from the mid-1980s to the mid-1990s, and featured in the top 10 of the Official World Golf Ranking for 83 weeks from 1987 to 1992.

== Early life and amateur career ==
McNulty was born in Bindura, Southern Rhodesia. He was raised on a farm in the Centenary area of Zimbabwe. When McNulty was one year old, his natural father was killed in a shooting accident. His step-father was an amateur pilot who had an airstrip on the farm. When his step-father was diagnosed with epilepsy, he was forced to give up flying. He converted the airstrip into a three-hole golf course, where Mark first learned to play golf.

McNulty represented Rhodesia at the 1974 Eisenhower Trophy in the Dominican Republic.

== Professional career ==
In 1978, McNulty began his professional career on the Southern African Tour and also played on the European Tour. His first professional win was at the Greater Manchester Open on the European Tour in 1979. His first win on the Southern African Tour was at the 1980 Holiday Inns Invitational in Swaziland.

By 1986, he was a dominant player on the Southern African Tour picking up seven official wins in that year and also winning South Africa's most lucrative event, the Million Dollar Challenge. In the same year, he finished in the top-10 on the European Tour's Order of Merit for the first time, placing sixth. He had six top-10 European Order of Merit finishes in total, including second places in 1987 and 1990. The last of these was in 1996, when he came fifth. His win tally on the European Tour was 16, including the 1996 Volvo Masters, which was the European equivalent of the PGA Tour's Tour Championship. He won the Sunshine Tour Order of Merit nine times.

In July 1990, at the 119th Open Championship at the Old Course in St Andrews, Scotland, with a closing round of 65 (−7), the lowest score of the last round, McNulty finished tied second with Payne Stewart, after winner Nick Faldo.

McNulty represented Zimbabwe seven times at the Alfred Dunhill Cup and eight times at the World Cup. The Zimbabwe team twice finished runner-up to United States, 1993, when McNulty teamed up with Nick Price at the Lake Nona Golf & Country Club in Orlando, Florida, and at the 1994 World Cup of Golf in Puerto Rico, where the team of McNulty and Tony Johnstone finished second and McNulty finished tied 4th in the individual competition.

=== Senior career ===
When McNulty turned fifty and became eligible to play senior golf he chose to take part in the U.S.-based Champions Tour. His first full season in 2004 was highly successful with three wins (including the Charles Schwab Cup Championship) and a seventh-place finish on the money list. In 2007 he won the JELD-WEN Tradition, one of the five major championships on the over-50 tour. It was McNulty's sixth career win on the Champions Tour. His seventh win came in 2009 at the Principal Charity Classic with a playoff win over Nick Price and Fred Funk. In 2011 he won the Liberty Mutual Legends of Golf.

== Personal life ==
In November 1981, McNulty received serious facial and neck injuries when his car in high speed collided with a bus near his parents' farm in Zimbabwe, on his way to the ICL International in Johannesburg, South Africa. Despite his injuries, McNulty played in the 1981 South African Open the following month and won a tournament in Durban in January 1982, eight weeks after the accident.

McNulty became an Irish citizen in 2003 at the age of 50. He was eligible to do so because his maternal grandmother was born in Ballymena in Northern Ireland. He stated that his reason for doing so was his concern that as a non-resident Zimbabwean it could take him up to two years to get his passport renewed if he lost it. Commentators elaborated that the farm that his family had been managing for 40-something years had been confiscated by the Mugabe regime.

He now lives in Sunningdale, England. He has two children.

McNulty is the Director of the Mark McNulty Junior Golf Foundation. It is a non-profit organisation whose objective is to use golf as a medium to improve a child's development on and off the golf course while growing the game of golf.

== Amateur wins ==
- 1974 Rhodesia Amateur Championship
- 1977 South African Amateur Stroke Play Championship

== Professional wins (59) ==
=== European Tour wins (16) ===
Legend
Tour Championships (1)
Other European Tour (15)

| No. | Date | Tournament | Winning score | Margin of victory | Runner(s)-up |
|---|---|---|---|---|---|
| 1 | 24 Jun 1979 | Greater Manchester Open | −13 (64-66-71-66=267) | 5 strokes | (Spain) Manuel Piñero |
| 2 | 24 Aug 1980 | Braun German Open | −8 (71-70-70-69=280) | 1 stroke | (England) Tony Charnley, (England) Neil Coles |
| 3 | 26 Oct 1986 | Portuguese Open | −18 (66-69-69-66=270) | 1 stroke | (England) Ian Mosey |
| 4 | 31 May 1987 | London Standard Four Stars National Pro-Celebrity | −15 (70-67-69-67=273) | Playoff | (Scotland) Sam Torrance |
| 5 | 7 Jun 1987 | Dunhill British Masters | −14 (71-65-71-67=274) | 1 stroke | (Wales) Ian Woosnam |
| 6 | 30 Aug 1987 | German Open (2) | −25 (65-66-65-63=259) | 3 strokes | (Spain) Antonio Garrido |
| 7 | 17 Apr 1988 | Cannes Open | −9 (72-71-70-66=279) | 3 strokes | (United States) Ron Commans, (United States) Joey Sindelar |
| 8 | 8 Jul 1989 | Torras Monte Carlo Open | −15 (68-64-64-65=261) | 6 strokes | (Spain) José María Cañizares, (South Africa) Jeff Hawkes |
| 9 | 16 Apr 1990 | Credit Lyonnais Cannes Open (2) | −8 (69-71-69-71=280) | 1 stroke | (Northern Ireland) Ronan Rafferty |
| 10 | 26 Aug 1990 | Volvo German Open (3) | −18 (67-68-70-65=270) | 3 strokes | (Australia) Craig Parry |
| 11 | 25 Aug 1991 | Volvo German Open (4) | −15 (68-67-72-66=273) | Playoff | (England) Paul Broadhurst |
| 12 | 7 Aug 1994 | BMW International Open | −14 (70-71-68-65=274) | 1 stroke | (Spain) Seve Ballesteros |
| 13 | 11 Feb 1996 | Dimension Data Pro-Am^{1} | −6 (69-67-73-73=282) | 4 strokes | (South Africa) Brenden Pappas, (Zimbabwe) Nick Price, (England) Ricky Willison |
| 14 | 28 Jul 1996 | Sun Microsystems Dutch Open | −18 (67-65-66-68=266) | 1 stroke | (United States) Scott Hoch |
| 15 | 27 Oct 1996 | Volvo Masters | −8 (72-69-67-68=276) | 7 strokes | (Argentina) José Cóceres, (Scotland) Sam Torrance, (South Africa) Wayne Westner, (England) Lee Westwood |
| 16 | 28 Jan 2001 | Mercedes-Benz South African Open^{1} | −8 (69-71-69-71=280) | 1 stroke | (England) Justin Rose |

^{1}Co-sanctioned by the Sunshine Tour

European Tour playoff record (2–2)

| No. | Year | Tournament | Opponent(s) | Result |
|---|---|---|---|---|
| 1 | 1987 | London Standard Four Stars National Pro-Celebrity | (Scotland) Sam Torrance | Won with birdie on second extra hole |
| 2 | 1990 | Wang Four Stars | (Australia) Mike Clayton, (Australia) Rodger Davis, (United States) Bill Malley | Davis won with birdie on seventh extra hole Malley and McNulty eliminated by par on first hole |
| 3 | 1991 | Volvo German Open | (England) Paul Broadhurst | Won with par on first extra hole |
| 4 | 1993 | Air France Cannes Open | (Australia) Rodger Davis | Lost to par on first extra hole |

=== Asia Golf Circuit wins (1) ===
| No. | Date | Tournament | Winning score | Margin of victory | Runner-up |
|---|---|---|---|---|---|
| 1 | 23 Mar 1980 | Malaysian Open | −15 (67-64-67-72=270) | 9 strokes | (Taiwan) Tsao Chien-teng |

=== Sunshine Tour wins (33) ===
Legend
Flagship events (1)
Tour Championships (2)
Other Sunshine Tour (30)

| No. | Date | Tournament | Winning score | Margin of victory | Runner(s)-up |
|---|---|---|---|---|---|
| 1 | 9 Feb 1980 | Holiday Inns Invitational | −14 (72-65-70-67=274) | 1 stroke | (South Africa) Tienie Britz |
| 2 | 10 Jan 1981 | Sigma Series 1 | −13 (68-70-70-67=275) | 2 strokes | (Zimbabwe) Nick Price |
| 3 | 9 Jan 1982 | SISA Classic | −12 (69-69-69-69=276) | 4 strokes | (South Africa) Hugh Baiocchi, (South Africa) Allan Henning, (South Africa) Gavan Levenson |
| 4 | 23 Jan 1982 | SAB South African Masters | −13 (68-64-69-74=275) | 2 strokes | (Zimbabwe) Denis Watson |
| 5 | 30 Jan 1982 | Sharp Electronics Open | −6 (69-69-70-66=274) | 1 stroke | (South Africa) Tienie Britz |
| 6 | 6 Feb 1982 | Sun City Classic | −5 (73-72-70-68=283) | 1 stroke | (South Africa) John Bland |
| 7 | 28 Jan 1984 | PAN AM Wild Coast | −4 (68-71-68-69=276) | 1 stroke | (South Africa) Harold Henning |
| 8 | 2 Feb 1985 | Swazi Sun Pro-Am (2) | −18 (70-64-67-69=270) | 1 stroke | (South Africa) Simon Hobday |
| 9 | 23 Feb 1985 | Palabora Classic | −13 (63-70-67-65=275) | Playoff | (South Africa) Hugh Baiocchi |
| 10 | 14 Dec 1985 | Safmarine South African Masters (2) | −10 (69-71-68-70=278) | 4 strokes | (South Africa) Fulton Allem, (Canada) Frank Edmonds, (South Africa) David Frost |
| 11 | 1 Feb 1986 | Wild Coast Classic (2) | −13 (66-66-71-64=267) | 6 strokes | (South Africa) David Frost |
| 12 | 23 Feb 1986 | Barclays Bank Classic | −9 (73-66-71-69=279) | 6 strokes | (South Africa) Fulton Allem |
| 13 | 9 Mar 1986 | Swazi Sun Pro-Am (3) | −25 (64-66-68-65=263) | Playoff | (South Africa) Fulton Allem |
| 14 | 16 Mar 1986 | Trustbank Tournament of Champions | −16 (70-68-68-66=272) | 6 strokes | (United States) Jack Ferenz, (Zimbabwe) Tony Johnstone |
| 15 | 23 Nov 1986 | Helix Wild Coast Classic (3) | −11 (66-74-75-64=279) | 2 strokes | (South Africa) John Bland |
| 16 | 29 Nov 1986 | Germiston Centenary Tournament | −18 (64-69-65-68=266) | 1 stroke | (South Africa) Fulton Allem |
| 17 | 13 Dec 1986 | Safmarine South African Masters (3) | −18 (70-65-67-68=270) | 4 strokes | (South Africa) Fulton Allem |
| 18 | 7 Feb 1987 | Southern Suns South African Open | −10 (74-66-71-67=278) | Playoff | (South Africa) Fulton Allem |
| 19 | 14 Feb 1987 | AECI Charity Classic | −14 (65-70-71-64=270) | Playoff | (South Africa) Wayne Westner |
| 20 | 22 Feb 1987 | Royal Swazi Sun Pro-Am (4) | −29 (68-65-64-62=259) | 6 strokes | (South Africa) Wayne Westner |
| 21 | 28 Feb 1987 | Trustbank Tournament of Champions (2) | −17 (68-68-68-67=271) | 4 strokes | (South Africa) Gavan Levenson |
| 22 | 17 Jan 1993 | Lexington PGA Championship | −15 (64-69-69-63=265) | 1 stroke | (South Africa) John Bland, (South Africa) David Frost, (Zimbabwe) Nick Price, (South Africa) Wayne Westner |
| 23 | 21 Nov 1993 | FNB Players Championship | −15 (69-68-70-66=273) | 5 strokes | (South Africa) Roger Wessels |
| 24 | 11 Feb 1996 | Dimension Data Pro-Am^{1} | −6 (69-67-73-73=282) | 4 strokes | (South Africa) Brenden Pappas, (Zimbabwe) Nick Price, (England) Ricky Willison |
| 25 | 8 Dec 1996 | Zimbabwe Open | −18 (72-61-68-69=270) | 4 strokes | (South Africa) Justin Hobday, (Zimbabwe) Nick Price |
| 26 | 19 Jan 1997 | San Lameer South African Masters (4) | −12 (71-68-70-67=276) | 4 strokes | (Brazil) Adilson da Silva |
| 27 | 26 Jan 1997 | Nashua Wild Coast Sun Challenge | −10 (66-68-70-66=270) | 9 strokes | (South Africa) Justin Hobday |
| 28 | 8 Mar 1998 | Vodacom Players Championship (2) | −5 (67-69-68-71=275) | 3 strokes | (South Africa) Warren Abery, (United States) Scott Dunlap |
| 29 | 6 Feb 2000 | Stenham Swazi Open (5) | −13 (64-74-68-61=267) | 2 strokes | (Scotland) Doug McGuigan |
| 30 | 26 Nov 2000 | CABS/Old Mutual Zimbabwe Open (2) | −19 (66-64-70-69=269) | 1 stroke | (South Africa) Jean Hugo |
| 31 | 14 Jan 2001 | Nashua Nedtel Cellular Masters (5) | −6 (64-67-70-73=274) | 1 stroke | (South Africa) Retief Goosen, (South Africa) Des Terblanche |
| 32 | 28 Jan 2001 | Mercedes-Benz South African Open^{1} (2) | −8 (69-71-69-71=280) | 1 stroke | (England) Justin Rose |
| 33 | 8 Dec 2002 | Vodacom Players Championship (3) | −16 (70-66-66-70=272) | 3 strokes | (United States) Scott Dunlap |

^{1}Co-sanctioned by the European Tour

Sunshine Tour playoff record (4–1)

| No. | Year | Tournament | Opponent | Result |
|---|---|---|---|---|
| 1 | 1985 | Palabora Classic | (South Africa) Hugh Baiocchi | Won with birdie on fifth extra hole |
| 2 | 1986 | Swazi Sun Pro-Am | (South Africa) Fulton Allem | Won with par on first extra hole |
| 3 | 1987 | Southern Suns South African Open | (South Africa) Fulton Allem | Won with par on second extra hole |
| 4 | 1987 | AECI Charity Classic | (South Africa) Wayne Westner | Won with birdie on first extra hole |
| 5 | 1995 | Telkom South African Masters | (United States) Scott Dunlap | Lost to birdie on first extra hole |

=== Challenge Tour wins (1) ===
| No. | Date | Tournament | Winning score | Margin of victory | Runner-up |
|---|---|---|---|---|---|
| 1 | 12 Jan 1992 | Zimbabwe Open | −16 (72-65-67-68=272) | 9 strokes | (Zimbabwe) Tony Johnstone |

=== Other wins (2) ===
| No. | Date | Tournament | Winning score | Margin of victory | Runner(s)-up |
|---|---|---|---|---|---|
| 1 | 7 Dec 1986 | Nedbank Million Dollar Challenge | −6 (74-70-70-68=282) | 3 strokes | (United States) Lanny Wadkins |
| 2 | 13 Nov 1988 | Benson & Hedges Trophy (with (France) Marie-Laure Taya) | −12 (69-68-67-72=276) | 1 stroke | (Spain) Tania Abitbol and (Spain) José María Cañizares |

=== Champions Tour wins (8) ===
Legend
Champions Tour major championships (1)
Tour Championships (1)
Other Champions Tour (6)

| No. | Date | Tournament | Winning score | Margin of victory | Runner(s)-up |
|---|---|---|---|---|---|
| 1 | 22 Feb 2004 | Outback Steakhouse Pro-Am | −13 (67-65-68=200) | 1 stroke | (United States) Larry Nelson |
| 2 | 17 Oct 2004 | SBC Championship | −18 (67-63-65=195) | 8 strokes | (United States) Gary McCord |
| 3 | 24 Oct 2004 | Charles Schwab Cup Championship | −11 (69-74-68-66=277) | 1 stroke | (United States) Tom Kite |
| 4 | 26 Jun 2005 | Bank of America Championship | −12 (67-69-68=204) | Playoff | (United States) Don Pooley, (United States) Tom Purtzer |
| 5 | 16 Oct 2005 | Administaff Small Business Classic | −16 (66-68-66=200) | 1 stroke | (United States) Gil Morgan |
| 6 | 19 Aug 2007 | JELD-WEN Tradition | −16 (66-68-70-68=272) | 5 strokes | (United States) David Edwards |
| 7 | 31 May 2009 | Principal Charity Classic | −10 (68-69-66=203) | Playoff | (United States) Fred Funk, (Zimbabwe) Nick Price |
| 8 | 24 Apr 2011 | Liberty Mutual Legends of Golf (with (United States) David Eger) | −27 (64-64-61=189) | Playoff | (United States) Scott Hoch and (United States) Kenny Perry |

Champions Tour playoff record (3–1)

| No. | Year | Tournament | Opponents | Result |
|---|---|---|---|---|
| 1 | 2005 | Bank of America Championship | (United States) Don Pooley, (United States) Tom Purtzer | Won with birdie on second extra hole |
| 2 | 2009 | Principal Charity Classic | (United States) Fred Funk, (Zimbabwe) Nick Price | Won with birdie on fourth extra hole Price eliminated by birdie on second hole |
| 3 | 2009 | The Senior Open Championship | (United States) Fred Funk, (United States) Loren Roberts | Roberts won with par on third extra hole Funk eliminated by birdie on first hole |
| 4 | 2011 | Liberty Mutual Legends of Golf (with (United States) David Eger) | (United States) Scott Hoch and (United States) Kenny Perry | Won with par on second extra hole |

== Results in major championships ==
| Tournament | 1980 | 1981 | 1982 | 1983 | 1984 | 1985 | 1986 | 1987 | 1988 | 1989 |
|---|---|---|---|---|---|---|---|---|---|---|
| Masters Tournament | | | | | | | | | T16 | CUT |
| U.S. Open | | T53 | CUT | T50 | CUT | CUT | T35 | T66 | T17 | CUT |
| The Open Championship | T23 | T23 | T54 | T45 | | CUT | T59 | T11 | T28 | T11 |
| PGA Championship | | | T54 | | | T70 | CUT | WD | T17 | |

| Tournament | 1990 | 1991 | 1992 | 1993 | 1994 | 1995 | 1996 | 1997 | 1998 | 1999 |
|---|---|---|---|---|---|---|---|---|---|---|
| Masters Tournament | | T35 | | | | CUT | | CUT | | |
| U.S. Open | | | T33 | | | CUT | | T28 | | |
| The Open Championship | T2 | T64 | T28 | T14 | T11 | T40 | T14 | 32 | CUT | T37 |
| PGA Championship | T8 | T27 | | CUT | T15 | | CUT | | | |

| Tournament | 2000 | 2001 | 2002 | 2003 |
|---|---|---|---|---|
| Masters Tournament | | | | |
| U.S. Open | | | | |
| The Open Championship | T11 | CUT | | T53 |
| PGA Championship | | CUT | | |

Top 10
Did not play

CUT = missed the half-way cut
WD = withdrew
"T" indicates a tie for a place.

=== Summary ===
| Tournament | Wins | 2nd | 3rd | Top-5 | Top-10 | Top-25 | Events | Cuts made |
|---|---|---|---|---|---|---|---|---|
| Masters Tournament | 0 | 0 | 0 | 0 | 0 | 1 | 5 | 2 |
| U.S. Open | 0 | 0 | 0 | 0 | 0 | 1 | 12 | 7 |
| The Open Championship | 0 | 1 | 0 | 1 | 1 | 9 | 22 | 19 |
| PGA Championship | 0 | 0 | 0 | 0 | 1 | 3 | 11 | 6 |
| Totals | 0 | 1 | 0 | 1 | 2 | 14 | 50 | 34 |

- Most consecutive cuts made – 9 (1989 Open Championship – 1993 Open Championship)
- Longest streak of top-10s – 2 (1990 Open Championship – 1990 PGA)

== Results in The Players Championship ==
| Tournament | 1991 | 1992 | 1993 | 1994 | 1995 | 1996 | 1997 |
|---|---|---|---|---|---|---|---|
| The Players Championship | T23 | T13 | | CUT | T23 | | T43 |

Did not play

CUT = missed the halfway cut
"T" indicates a tie for a place

== Results in World Golf Championships ==
| Tournament | 2001 |
|---|---|
| Match Play | R16 |
| Championship | NT^{1} |
| Invitational | |

^{1}Cancelled due to 9/11

Top 10
Did not play

QF, R16, R32, R64 = Round in which player lost in match play
NT = No tournament

== Senior major championships ==
=== Wins (1) ===
| Year | Championship | Winning score | Margin | Runner-up |
|---|---|---|---|---|
| 2007 | JELD-WEN Tradition | −16 (66-68-70-68=272) | 5 strokes | (United States) David Edwards |

=== Senior results timeline ===
Results not in chronological order.

| Tournament | 2004 | 2005 | 2006 | 2007 | 2008 | 2009 | 2010 | 2011 | 2012 | 2013 | 2014 | 2015 | 2016 | 2017 | 2018 | 2019 | 2020 | 2021 | 2022 | 2023 | 2024 |
|---|---|---|---|---|---|---|---|---|---|---|---|---|---|---|---|---|---|---|---|---|---|
| The Tradition | | 8 | T46 | 1 | T25 | T25 | | T16 | T59 | T44 | T46 | T29 | | | | T53 | | | | | |
| Senior PGA Championship | T7 | T6 | T19 | | | T17 | | T34 | T38 | T28 | T48 | T9 | | | | | | | | | |
| U.S. Senior Open | T19 | T7 | T14 | T18 | 3 | T36 | | T48 | | T42 | | | | | | | | | | | |
| Senior Players Championship | T9 | T11 | T41 | T31 | T52 | | | T28 | 77 | T52 | 5 | T54 | | | | | | | | | |
| Senior British Open Championship | T5 | 8 | T27 | T34 | T16 | T2 | | T44 | T18 | T26 | CUT | T31 | CUT | 30 | T60 | T18 | | | | CUT | CUT |

Win
Top 10
Did not play

CUT = missed the halfway cut
"T" indicates a tie for a place

== Team appearances ==
Amateur

- Eisenhower Trophy (representing Rhodesia): 1974

Professional

- Alfred Dunhill Cup (representing Zimbabwe): 1993, 1994, 1995, 1996, 1997, 1998, 1999, 2000
- World Cup (representing Zimbabwe): 1993, 1994, 1995, 1996, 1997, 1998, 1999, 2000, 2001
- Presidents Cup (International team): 1994, 1996
- Alfred Dunhill Challenge (representing Southern Africa): 1995 (winners)
- UBS Cup (representing the Rest of the World): 2004

== See also ==
- List of golfers with most European Tour wins
