= ICL International =

Golf tournament in South Africa

Tournament information
- Location: Pretoria, South Africa
- Established: 1911
- Course: Zwartkop Country Club
- Par: 72
- Tour: Southern Africa Tour
- Format: Stroke play
- Prize fund: R 550,000
- Month played: January
- Final year: 1995

Tournament record score
- Aggregate: 265 Bobby Locke (1939); 265 Bobby Locke (1954); 265 Dale Hayes (1978)
- To par: −22 Tony Johnstone (1988)

Final champion
- (South Africa) Ashley Roestoff
- Location in South Africa Location in Gauteng

The ICL International, formerly the Transvaal Open, was a golf tournament in South Africa as part of the Southern Africa Tour. The list of winners includes major champions Gary Player, Nick Faldo, and Nick Price.

The tournament was initially played at Kensington Golf Club in Johannesburg. It moved to Zwartkop Country Club in Pretoria from 1984 to 1995.

== Winners ==
Year	Winner	Score	To par	Margin of victory	Runner(s)-up	Ref.
ICL International
1995	(South Africa) Ashley Roestoff	275	−13	4 strokes	(United States) Michael Christie (South Africa) Kevin Stone	
1994	(Zimbabwe) Nick Price (3)	267	−21	9 strokes	(South Africa) David Frost (United States) Bruce Vaughan	
1993	(Zimbabwe) Nick Price (2)	273	−15	2 strokes	(Zimbabwe) Mark McNulty (United States) Bruce Vaughan	
1992	(United States) Kevin Johnson	270	−18	2 strokes	(South Africa) De Wet Basson (Zimbabwe) Tony Johnstone	
1991	(South Africa) Fulton Allem	271	−17	3 strokes	(South Africa) Gavan Levenson (South Africa) Ashley Roestoff (South Africa) Wayne Westner	
1990	(South Africa) Gavan Levenson (2)	269	−19	2 strokes	(South Africa) Wayne Westner	
1989	(South Africa) Chris Williams	272	−16	1 stroke	(United States) J. C. Anderson	
1988	(Zimbabwe) Tony Johnstone (2)	266	−22	1 stroke	(England) Denis Durnian	
1987	(Zimbabwe) Tony Johnstone	271	−17	6 strokes	(South Africa) Justin Hobday (South Africa) Wilhelm Winsnes	
1986	(South Africa) Gavan Levenson	270	−18	1 stroke	(South Africa) David Frost	
1985	(Zimbabwe) Nick Price	268	−20	1 stroke	(South Africa) Gavan Levenson	
1984	(Northern Ireland) David Feherty	271	−17	1 stroke	(South Africa) Gavan Levenson (Zimbabwe) Nick Price	
ICL Tournament Players Classic
1983	(South Africa) Wayne Westner	273	−15	1 stroke	(South Africa) Allan Henning	
ICL International
1982: No tournament
1981	(South Africa) Simon Hobday	272	−16	7 strokes	(South Africa) John Bland	
1980	(South Africa) Simon Hobday	281	−7	1 stroke	(South Africa) John Bland (England) Ian Mosey (Zimbabwe) Denis Watson	
1979	(England) Nick Faldo	268	−16	3 strokes	(South Africa) Allan Henning	
1978	(South Africa) Dale Hayes	265	−15	Playoff	(South Africa) Hugh Baiocchi	
1977	(South Africa) Gary Player (6)	268	−12	2 strokes	(South Africa) Bobby Cole	
1976 (Dec)	(South Africa) Hugh Baiocchi (2)	268	−12	1 stroke	(South Africa) Tienie Britz (South Africa) Gary Player	
1976 (Jan)	(England) Peter Townsend	207 (Note: Shortened to 54 holes due to rain.)	−3	1 stroke	(South Africa) Dale Hayes (South Africa) Allan Henning	
ICL Transvaal Open
1975: No tournament (Note: The tournament was postponed in December 1975, and rescheduled to January 1976.)
1974	(South Africa) Vin Baker	280	−8	Playoff	(South Africa) Andries Oosthuizen	
1973 (Dec)	(South Africa) Hugh Baiocchi	276	−12	1 stroke	(South Africa) Dale Hayes	
1973 (Jan)	(South Africa) John Fourie	280	−4	Playoff	(South Africa) Allan Henning	
1972	(South Africa) Bobby Cole	270	−14	Playoff	(South Africa) Tienie Britz	
Leykor Transvaal Open
1971	(England) Peter Oosterhuis	279	−9	6 strokes	(South Africa) Graham Henning	
Transvaal Open
1970	(South Africa) John Bland	281		1 stroke	(Rhodesia) Don Gammon (South Africa) Hugh Inggs	
1969	(South Africa) Bobby Verwey (2)					
1968	(South Africa) Cobie Legrange					
1967	(South Africa) Allan Henning	274		9 strokes	(South Africa) Cobie Legrange	
1966	(South Africa) Gary Player (5)					
1965	(South Africa) Bobby Verwey					
1964: No tournament
1963	(South Africa) Retief Waltman	277		1 stroke	(South Africa) Denis Hutchinson	
1962	(South Africa) Gary Player (4)					
1961 (Dec)	(South Africa) Gary Player (3)	266		9 strokes	(South Africa) Bobby Locke	
1961 (Jan)	(South Africa) Alan Brookes					
1960	(South Africa) Gary Player (2)	271				
1959	(South Africa) Gary Player	266				
1958	(South Africa) Bobby Locke (11)	276				
1957	(South Africa) Harold Henning	278				
1956	(South Africa) Bruce Keyter	281		1 stroke	(South Africa) Bobby Locke	
1955	(South Africa) Bobby Locke (10)	285				
1954	(South Africa) Bobby Locke (9)	265				
1953	(South Africa) Tommy Trevena					
1952	(South Africa) Sandy Guthrie					
1951	(South Africa) Bobby Locke (8)					
1950	(South Africa) Bobby Locke (7)	280				
1949	(South Africa) Bobby Locke (6)					
1948	(South Africa) Otway Hayes					
1947	(South Africa) Roderick Dunn					
1946	(South Africa) Bobby Locke (5)					
1941–1945: No tournament
1940	(South Africa) Bobby Locke (4)					
1939	(South Africa) Bobby Locke (3)	265				
1938	(South Africa) Bobby Locke (2)	277		4 strokes	(South Africa) Sid Brews	
1937	(South Africa) Bobby Locke (a)	286		4 strokes	(England) Alf Padgham	
1936	(South Africa) Sid Brews (8)	285		1 stroke	(South Africa) Bobby Locke	
1935	(South Africa) Sid Brews (7)					
1934	(South Africa) Sid Brews (6)					
1933	(South Africa) Sid Brews (5)					
1932	(South Africa) Sid Brews (4)					
1931	(South Africa) Sid Brews (3)					
1930	(South Africa) Sid Brews (2)					
1929	(England) Charles McIlvenny (2)					
1928: No tournament
1927	(England) Charles McIlvenny					
1926	(England) Bert Elkin					
1925: No tournament
1924	(South Africa) Sid Brews					
1923	(South Africa) Jock Brews (3)					
1922	(South Africa) Fred Jangle					
1921	(South Africa) Jock Brews (2)					
1920	(Scotland) Laurie Waters (3)					
1919	(Scotland) Laurie Waters (2)					
1914–1918: No tournament
1913	(South Africa) Jock Brews					
1912: No tournament
1911	(Scotland) Laurie Waters					
