= 1992–93 Southern Africa Tour =

Golf tour season

1992–93 Southern Africa Tour season
- Duration: 19 December 1992 – 28 February 1993
- Number of official events: 9
- Most wins: (South Africa) Ernie Els (2)
- Order of Merit: (Zimbabwe) Mark McNulty

The 1992–93 Southern Africa Tour, titled as the 1992–93 FNB Tour for sponsorship reasons, was the 22nd season of the Southern Africa Tour, the main professional golf tour in South Africa since it was formed in 1971.

== FNB title sponsorship ==
It was the first season in which the tour had signed a title sponsorship agreement with First National Bank, being renamed as the FNB Tour.

== Season outline ==
A handful of top golfers dominated the first part of the season. Ernie Els won the first event of the season, the FNB Players Championship, by four shots over Mark McNulty. David Frost won the next event, the Nedbank Million Dollar Challenge with Els finishing joint third. Els returned with a victory at the next official event, the Goodyear Classic, by two shots over Retief Goosen. Fijian Vijay Singh won the first event after the Christmas break, the Bell's Cup, defeating McNulty by two shots. McNulty, however, came back and won the following week at the Lexington PGA Championship by one shot over a number of players, including Nick Price. At the fifth official tournament, the Mount Edgecombe Trophy, Goosen won his first event of the season, defeating runner-up Price by five shots. Price returned with a victory the following week at the ICL International.

In the later part of the season, a number of less notable players defeated the top performers. At the seventh event, the Philips South African Open, Clinton Whitelaw was victorious by two shots over Goosen. The following week, at the Hollard Royal Swazi Sun Classic, Sean Pappas defeated Els in a playoff. At the final event of the season, the EVS South African Masters, Zimbabwean Tony Johnstone defeated Roger Wessels by a shot with McNulty, Els, and Goosen all several shots back.

== Schedule ==
The following table lists official events during the 1992–93 season.

Date	Tournament	Location	Purse (R)	Winner (Note: The number in brackets after each winner's name is the number of Southern Africa Tour events they had won up to and including that tournament. This information is only shown for Southern Africa Tour members.)	OWGR points	Notes
22 Nov	FNB Players Championship	Transvaal	500,000	(South Africa) Ernie Els (5)	26	New tournament
20 Dec	Goodyear Classic	Cape	350,000	(South Africa) Ernie Els (6)	14	
10 Jan	Bell's Cup	Cape	450,000	(Fiji) Vijay Singh (n/a)	26	
17 Jan	Lexington PGA Championship	Transvaal	500,000	(Zimbabwe) Mark McNulty (22)	26	
24 Jan	Mount Edgecombe Trophy	Natal	450,000	(South Africa) Retief Goosen (2)	20	New tournament
31 Jan	ICL International	Transvaal	450,000	(Zimbabwe) Nick Price (5)	18	
14 Feb	Philips South African Open	Transvaal	500,000	(South Africa) Clinton Whitelaw (1)	18	
21 Feb	Hollard Royal Swazi Sun Classic	Swaziland	350,000	(South Africa) Sean Pappas (1)	14	
28 Feb	EVS South African Masters	Transvaal	550,000	(Zimbabwe) Tony Johnstone (13)	18	

=== Unofficial events ===
The following events were sanctioned by the Southern Africa Tour, but did not carry official money, nor were wins official.

Date	Tournament	Location	Purse (R)	Winner	OWGR points	Notes
6 Dec	Nedbank Million Dollar Challenge	Transvaal	US$2,500,000	(South Africa) David Frost	52	Limited-field event

== Order of Merit ==
The Order of Merit was based on prize money won during the season, calculated in South African rand.

Position	Player	Prize money (R)
1	(Zimbabwe) Mark McNulty	250,079
2	(South Africa) Ernie Els	222,496
3	(South Africa) Retief Goosen	204,289
4	(Zimbabwe) Nick Price	170,450
5	(South Africa) Roger Wessels	128,843
