= 1985–86 Southern Africa Tour =

Golf tour season

1985–86 Southern Africa Tour season
- Duration: 11 December 1985 – 16 March 1986
- Number of official events: 11
- Most wins: (Zimbabwe) Mark McNulty (5)
- Order of Merit: (Zimbabwe) Mark McNulty

The 1985–86 Southern Africa Tour was the 15th season of the Southern Africa Tour, the main professional golf tour in South Africa since it was formed in 1971.

== Season outline ==
South African David Frost had much success in the early part of the season, finishing in first or second place at the first six events. At the first tournament, the Safmarine South African Masters, Frost finished runner-up, four behind champion Mark McNulty. The Goodyear Classic, played the following week, saw Denis Watson beat Frost by one shot. At the third event, the ICL International, Gavan Levenson beat Frost by one shot. At the Lexington PGA Championship, Frost once again finished runner-up, five shots behind winner Bobby Cole. The final round of the fifth tournament, the Wild Coast Classic, started as a "match-play duel" between Frost and McNulty before McNulty went on to a "runaway win." Frost finished solo second. At the sixth event of the season, the Southern Suns South African Open, Frost finally won, birdieing the final three holes for a three stroke win over Tony Johnstone. This was his last event of the season; days later Frost flew to America play on the PGA Tour.

For the remainder of the season, Fulton Allem and Mark McNulty were the top contenders, earning the top two slots at nearly every late season event. At the seventh event, the AECI Charity Classic, Allem outdueled McNulty down the stretch and defeated him by a shot. The following week, however, McNulty recorded a final round 69 to win by six shots over runner-up Allem at the Barclays Bank Classic. Allem won the next event, the Palabora Classic. The following week, at the Swazi Sun Pro-Am, McNulty shot a 65 and against Allem's 66 in the final round to tie at the end of the regulation. At the par-3 playoff hole, Allem made bogey, giving McNulty the win. McNulty also won the final event, the Trustbank Tournament of Champions. McNulty won the Order of Merit in a "runaway." Allem finished second.

== Schedule ==
The following table lists official events during the 1985–86 season.

Date	Tournament	Location	Purse (R)	Winner (Note: The number in brackets after each winner's name is the number of Southern Africa Tour events they had won up to and including that tournament. This information is only shown for Southern Africa Tour members.)	OWGR points	Notes
14 Dec	Safmarine South African Masters	Cape	100,000	(Zimbabwe) Mark McNulty (10)	n/a	
21 Dec	Goodyear Classic	Transvaal	100,000	(Zimbabwe) Denis Watson (3)	n/a	
18 Jan	ICL International	Transvaal	100,000	(South Africa) Gavan Levenson (4)	10	
25 Jan	Lexington PGA Championship	Transvaal	100,000	(South Africa) Bobby Cole (7)	20	
1 Feb	Wild Coast Classic	Cape	100,000	(Zimbabwe) Mark McNulty (11)	10	
8 Feb	Southern Suns South African Open	Transvaal	100,000	(South Africa) David Frost (2)	20	
15 Feb	AECI Charity Classic	Transvaal	100,000	(South Africa) Fulton Allem (1)	10	
23 Feb	Barclays Bank Classic	Transvaal	100,000	(Zimbabwe) Mark McNulty (12)	10	New tournament
1 Mar	Palabora Classic	Transvaal	110,000	(South Africa) Fulton Allem (2)	10	
9 Mar	Swazi Sun Pro-Am	Swaziland	100,000	(Zimbabwe) Mark McNulty (13)	10	Pro-Am
16 Mar	Trustbank Tournament of Champions	Transvaal	120,000	(Zimbabwe) Mark McNulty (14)	20	Tour Championship

=== Unofficial events ===
The following events were sanctioned by the Southern Africa Tour, but did not carry official money, nor were wins official.

Date	Tournament	Location	Purse (R)	Winner	Notes
8 Dec	Nedbank Million Dollar Challenge	Transvaal	US$1,000,000	(West Germany) Bernhard Langer	Limited-field event

== Order of Merit ==
The Order of Merit was based on prize money won during the season, calculated in South African rand.

Position	Player	Prize money (R)
1	(Zimbabwe) Mark McNulty	113,527
