= Investec Royal Swazi Open =

Golf tournament

Tournament information
- Location: Ezulwini Valley, Eswatini
- Established: 1971
- Course: Royal Swazi Spa
- Par: 72
- Length: 7,834 yards (7,163 m)
- Tour: Sunshine Tour
- Format: Modified Stableford
- Prize fund: R 1,500,000
- Month played: October
- Final year: 2020

Tournament record score
- Aggregate: 259 Mark McNulty (1987)
- To par: −29 as above
- Score: 65 points Jaco van Zyl (2009)

Final champion
- (South Africa) Daniel van Tonder
- Location in Eswatini

The Investec Royal Swazi Open was a golf tournament on the Sunshine Tour. It was first played in 1971 and was played at the Royal Swazi Spa Country Club in the Ezulwini Valley, Eswatini. Since 2003, it was played using a Modified Stableford System.

== Winners ==
Year	Winner	Score	To par	Margin of victory	Runner(s)-up	Ref.
Investec Royal Swazi Open
2020	(South Africa) Daniel van Tonder (2)	48 points		18 points	(South Africa) Neil Schietekat	
2019	(South Africa) Martin Rohwer	59 points		12 points	(South Africa) Jake Roos (England) Steve Surry	
2018	(South Africa) Justin Harding	47 points		1 point	(South Africa) Lyle Rowe	
2017	(South Africa) Peter Karmis	49 points		1 point	(United States) Zack Byrd	
2016	(South Africa) Titch Moore	60 points		11 points	(Brazil) Adilson da Silva	
2015	(South Africa) PH McIntyre	45 points		1 point	(South Africa) Morne Buys	
2014	(South Africa) Daniel van Tonder	48 points		Playoff	(South Africa) Jacques Blaauw (South Africa) Jared Harvey	
2013	(South Africa) James Kingston	45 points		Playoff	(South Africa) Ruan de Smidt	
2012	(South Africa) Christiaan Basson	50 points		1 point	(South Africa) Desvonde Botes (South Africa) Daniel van Tonder	
2011	(South Africa) Justin Walters	45 points		1 point	(South Africa) Divan van den Heever	
2010	(South Africa) Keith Horne	47 points		1 point	(South Africa) Christiaan Basson	
Samsung Royal Swazi Sun Open
2009	(South Africa) Jaco van Zyl	65 points		12 points	(Zimbabwe) Tongoona Charamba (South Africa) Tyrone van Aswegen	
2008	(South Africa) Jean Hugo	56 points		6 points	(South Africa) Neil Schietekat	
2007	(South Africa) Des Terblanche (2)	50 points		2 points	(South Africa) James Kamte	
2006	(South Africa) Thomas Aiken	59 points		9 points	(South Africa) Steve Basson	
Capital Alliance Royal Swazi Sun Open
2005	(South Africa) Hendrik Buhrmann	42 points		1 point	(South Africa) Ross Wellington	
2004	(South Africa) Nic Henning	42 points		1 point	(South Africa) Titch Moore	
2003	(South Africa) Des Terblanche	36 points		Playoff	(Brazil) Adilson da Silva	
Royal Swazi Sun Open
2002	(South Africa) Andrew McLardy	268	−20	2 strokes	(South Africa) Nic Henning	
Investec Royal Swazi Sun Open
2001	(South Africa) Bradford Vaughan	263	−25	8 strokes	(England) Mark Hilton (South Africa) Trevor Immelman	
Stenham Swazi Open
2000	(Zimbabwe) Mark McNulty (5)	267	−13	2 strokes	(Scotland) Doug McGuigan	
Stenham Royal Swazi Sun Open
1999	(Zimbabwe) Marc Cayeux	266	−22	3 strokes	(Zimbabwe) Mark McNulty	
1998	(Eswatini) Paul Friedlander	201	−15	Playoff	(United States) Scott Dunlap	
Hollard Royal Swazi Sun Open
1997	(South Africa) Warrick Druian	269	−19	1 stroke	(England) Chris Davison (South Africa) Nic Henning	
Hollard Royal Swazi Sun Classic
1996	(South Africa) Richard Kaplan	271	−17	Playoff	(South Africa) Wayne Westner	
1995	(United States) Brad Ott	266	−22	2 strokes	(England) Chris Davison (South Africa) Richard Kaplan	
1994	(United States) Omar Uresti	274	−14	2 strokes	(United States) Andrew Pitts	
1993	(South Africa) Sean Pappas	272	−16	Playoff	(South Africa) Ernie Els	
1992	(South Africa) Ernie Els	269	−19	1 stroke	(England) Chris Davison	
1991	(United States) Hugh Royer III	265	−23	4 strokes	(United States) Robin Freeman (South Africa) Des Terblanche	
1990	(United States) John Daly	267	−21	2 strokes	(South Africa) John Bland	
1989	(South Africa) Jeff Hawkes	202 (Note: Shortened to 54 holes due to rain.)	−14	1 stroke	(United States) John Daly (Eswatini) Joe Dlamini	
Helix Swazi Sun Classic
1988	(United States) Don Levin	268	−20	Playoff	(United States) Alan Pate	
Royal Swazi Sun Pro-Am
1987	(Zimbabwe) Mark McNulty (4)	259	−29	6 strokes	(South Africa) Wayne Westner	
Swazi Sun Pro-Am
1986	(Zimbabwe) Mark McNulty (3)	263	−25	Playoff	(South Africa) Fulton Allem	
1985	(Zimbabwe) Mark McNulty (2)	270	−18	1 stroke	(South Africa) Simon Hobday	
1984	(United States) Rick Hartmann	271	−17	1 stroke	(Zimbabwe) Teddy Webber	
Holiday Inns Pro-Am
1983	(South Africa) John Bland (3)	271	−17	2 strokes	(Zimbabwe) Teddy Webber	
1982	(Zimbabwe) Denis Watson	268	−20	4 strokes	(South Africa) Fulton Allem	
1981	(England) Ian Mosey	278	−10	Playoff	(England) Nigel Burch (South Africa) Allan Henning	
Holiday Inns Invitational
1980	(Southern Rhodesia) Mark McNulty	274	−14	1 stroke	(South Africa) Tienie Britz	
Holiday Inns Open
1979	(South Africa) John Bland (2)	267	−21	Playoff	(South Africa) Andries Oosthuizen	
1978: No tournament
Holiday Inns Invitational
1977	(South Africa) John Bland	265	−23	4 strokes	(South Africa) Bobby Cole	
1976	(South Africa) Hugh Baiocchi	273	−15	Playoff	(South Africa) Dale Hayes	
Holiday Inns Open
1975 (Dec)	(South Africa) Dale Hayes (3)	275	−13	Playoff	(South Africa) John Fourie	
Holiday Inns Invitational
1975 (Feb)	(Republic of Ireland) John O'Leary	271	−17	4 strokes	(South Africa) John Fourie (South Africa) Dale Hayes	
Holiday Inns Open
1974	(South Africa) Dale Hayes (2)	269	−19	2 strokes	(New Zealand) Bob Charles	
1973	(South Africa) Dale Hayes	136	−8	1 stroke	(South Africa) Trevor Wilkes	
1972	(United States) John Buczek	270	−18	1 stroke	(South Africa) Cobie Legrange	
Holiday Inns Invitational
1971	(South Africa) Cobie Legrange	273	−15	Playoff	(South Africa) Denis Hutchinson	

== See also ==
- Open golf tournament
