= Holiday Inns Champion of Champions =

Tournament information
- Location: Johannesburg, South Africa
- Established: 1976
- Course: Kensington Golf Club
- Tour: South African Tour
- Format: 36-hole stroke play
- Prize fund: R 10,000
- Month played: December
- Final year: 1976

Final champion
- (South Africa) John Bland
- Location in South Africa Location in Gauteng

The Holiday Inns Champion of Champions was a golf tournament on the South African Tour. It was played just once, in late December 1976, at Kensington Golf Club in Johannesburg, South Africa. The winner was John Bland, who defeated Hugh Baiocchi and Graham Henning in a two-hole aggregate playoff.

== Winners ==
Year	Winner	Score	Margin of victory	Runner(s)-up	Ref.
1976	(South Africa) John Bland	133	Playoff (Note: Bland won a two-hole aggregate playoff (Bland: 3-4, Baiocchi: 4-4, Henning: 4-4).)	(South Africa) Hugh Baiocchi (South Africa) Graham Henning	

== See also ==
- Trustbank Tournament of Champions
