= 1981–82 Southern Africa Tour =

Golf tour season

1981–82 Southern Africa Tour season
- Duration: 25 November 1981 – 19 February 1982
- Number of official events: 9
- Most wins: (Zimbabwe) Mark McNulty (4)
- Order of Merit: (Zimbabwe) Mark McNulty

The 1981–82 Southern Africa Tour was the 11th season of the Southern Africa Tour, the main professional golf tour in South Africa since it was formed in 1971.

== Season outline ==
The early season was dominated by veteran Gary Player who won the top two events, the Datsun South African Open and the Lexington PGA Championship. The remainder of the season belonged to Mark McNulty who won the next three events and secured the Order of Merit by a wide margin.

South African legend Gary Player had much success early in the season. At the second event, the Datsun South African Open, England's Warren Humphreys, John Bland and Player tied at 272 at the end of regulation. An 18-hole playoff took place to decide the champion. Player and Bland scored rounds of 70 to beat Humphreys by two strokes. Player then won with a birdie on the first extra hole of a sudden-death playoff to defeat Bland. At the following event, the Lexington PGA Championship, Player overcame a four stroke 54-hole deficit, shooting a two-under-par 68 against strong winds to win again. "I am incredibly happy to win the PGA after taking the SA Open earlier this year," he said after the event.

Mark McNulty dominated the remainder of the season. In late January, though he "struggled" during the final round, he still won the SAB South African Masters by two shots over Denis Watson. The following week, he overcame a six stroke deficit to defeat Tienie Britz by one at the Sharp Electronics Open. For the third successive week, McNulty won again, this time at the Sun City Classic, defeating John Bland by one shot. McNulty ultimately won the Order of Merit by a wide margin.

== Schedule ==
The following table lists official events during the 1981–82 season.

Date	Tournament	Location	Purse (R)	Winner (Note: The number in brackets after each winner's name is the number of Southern Africa Tour events they had won up to and including that tournament. This information is only shown for Southern Africa Tour members.)	Notes
28 Nov	ICL International	Transvaal	50,000	(South Africa) Simon Hobday (4)	
5 Dec	Datsun South African Open	Transvaal	85,000	(South Africa) Gary Player (19)	
9 Jan	SISA Classic	Natal	50,000	(Zimbabwe) Mark McNulty (3)	New tournament
16 Jan	Lexington PGA Championship	Transvaal	100,000	(South Africa) Gary Player (20)	
23 Jan	SAB South African Masters	Cape	100,000	(Zimbabwe) Mark McNulty (4)	
30 Jan	Sharp Electronics Open	Transvaal	100,000	(Zimbabwe) Mark McNulty (5)	New tournament
6 Feb	Sun City Classic	Transvaal	100,000	(Zimbabwe) Mark McNulty (6)	
13 Feb	Sigma Vaal Reefs Open	Transvaal	40,000	(Zimbabwe) Nick Price (3)	
19 Feb	Holiday Inns Pro-Am	Transvaal	40,000	(Zimbabwe) Denis Watson (2)	Pro-Am

=== Unofficial events ===
The following events were sanctioned by the Southern Africa Tour, but did not carry official money, nor were wins official.

Date	Tournament	Location	Purse (R)	Winner	Notes
3 Jan	Nedbank Million Dollar Challenge	Transvaal	US$1,000,000	(United States) Johnny Miller	Limited-field event

== Order of Merit ==
The Order of Merit was based on prize money won during the season, calculated in South African rand.

Position	Player	Prize money (R)
1	(Zimbabwe) Mark McNulty	67,054
2	(Zimbabwe) Denis Watson	38,512
3	Gary Player	38,286
4	(South Africa) John Bland	36,866
5	(Zimbabwe) Nick Price	28,920
