= Charles McIlvenny =

English golfer

Personal information
- Nationality: England
- Born: 1897 Beaconsfield, Buckinghamshire, England

Career
- Sport: Golf
- Status: Professional
- Professional wins: 7

Best results in major championships
- Masters Tournament: DNP
- PGA Championship: DNP
- U.S. Open: DNP
- The Open Championship: T44: 1930

Charles McIlvenny (born 1897) was an English-born professional golfer. McIlvenny was a professional at West Middlesex and Sudbury in the early 1920s. He reached the third round of the News of the World Match Play in 1924, losing to Ernest Whitcombe, and emigrated to South Africa soon afterwards to become the professional at Port Elizabeth. He won the 1932 South African Open Championship and the South African PGA Championship four times between 1927 and 1932. He returned to England in 1930 and played in the Open Championship. In 1934 he was married in Port Elizabeth to Barbara Kingsmill Hopkins (née Christian).

== Professional wins ==
- 1927 South African PGA Championship, Transvaal Open
- 1929 South African PGA Championship, Transvaal Open
- 1931 South African PGA Championship
- 1932 South African Open Championship, South African PGA Championship

== Results in major championships ==
Tournament	1922	1923	1924	1925	1926	1927	1928	1929	1930
The Open Championship	T49	T53							T44

Note: McIlvenny only played in The Open Championship.

Did not play

"T" indicates a tie for a place
