= Alfred Dunhill Challenge =

1995 golf tournament

The Alfred Dunhill Challenge was a professional team golf tournament played at Houghton Golf Club, Johannesburg, South Africa between teams representing Southern Africa and Australasia. It was played from 24 to 26 February 1995 and involved four-ball and foursomes matches on the first two days, with 9 singles on the final day in a Ryder Cup style contest. Southern Africa won the match 14–11, having led 6½–1½ after first day and 9½–6½ after second day.

There were teams of 9 with a non-playing captain. The Southern Africa team was Fulton Allem, Hendrik Buhrmann, Ernie Els, David Frost, Retief Goosen, Tony Johnstone, Mark McNulty, Nick Price and Wayne Westner, with Gary Player as non-playing captain. The Australasian team was Robert Allenby, Michael Campbell, Mike Clayton, Wayne Grady, Frank Nobilo, Greg Norman, Lucas Parsons, Vijay Singh and Greg Turner, with Terry Gale as non-playing captain.
