= Bell's Cup =

The Bell's Cup was a tournament on the Sunshine Tour during the early 1990s. International stars like Vijay Singh and Ernie Els won the event.

== Winners ==
- 1991 (South Africa) John Bland
- 1992 (Northern Ireland) David Feherty
- 1993 (Fiji) Vijay Singh
- 1994 (Zimbabwe) Tony Johnstone
- 1995 (South Africa) Ernie Els
