= Denis Watson =

Zimbabwean professional golfer (born 1955)

Personal information
- Full name: Denis Leslie Watson
- Nationality: Rhodesia (until 1978); Southern Rhodesia (1979–1980); Zimbabwe (1980–)
- Born: 18 October 1955 (age 71) Salisbury, Rhodesia (now Harare, Zimbabwe)
- Height: 6 ft 0 in (1.83 m)
- Weight: 190 lb (86 kg; 14 st)
- Spouse: Susan E. Loggans
- Children: 7

Career
- Sport: Golf
- Turned professional: 1976
- Former tours: PGA Tour; European Tour; Southern Africa Tour; Champions Tour; European Seniors Tour
- Professional wins: 10

Number of wins by tour
- PGA Tour: 3
- Sunshine Tour: 3
- PGA Tour Champions: 4
- European Senior Tour: 1

Best results in major championships
- Masters Tournament: T27: 1987
- PGA Championship: 33rd: 1984
- U.S. Open: T2: 1985
- The Open Championship: T15: 1982

Achievements and awards
- Champions Tour Rookie of the Year: 2007

Denis Leslie Watson (born 18 October 1955) is a professional golfer from Zimbabwe.

== Early life and amateur career ==
Watson was born in Salisbury, Rhodesia. He was educated at Oriel Boys High School, Chisipite.

Watson represented Rhodesia at the 1974 Eisenhower Trophy in the Dominican Republic, in the same team as Mark McNulty, George Harvey, and Teddy Webber. The team finished 14th and Watson was the best scoring Rhodesian player.

In August 1975, Watson, together with George Harvey, represented Rhodesia at El Rincon Golf Club in Bogotá, Colombia, among 18 two-man nation teams, competing for the Coupa El Rincon over 72 holes stroke-play. The Rhodesian team won, ten strokes ahead of Sweden, and Watson won individually on a score of 7-under par 281, five strokes ahead of Jan Rube, Sweden.

In the early 1970s, Watson served in the Rhodesian military during what he described as a "terrorist war." Watson was awarded Rhodesian Sportsman of the Year in 1975. He would then immigrate to neighboring South Africa to pursue his golf career. He represented South Africa at the World Series of Golf in 1980 and 1982.

== Professional career ==
In 1976, Watson turned professional. He played on the European Tour from 1978 to 1980. Watson attempted to make it onto the PGA Tour at Spring 1981 PGA Tour Qualifying School. He was successful finishing in fourth place. In 1984, he had his career year, recording victories at the Buick Open, NEC World Series of Golf, and Panasonic Las Vegas Invitational. This tied for the most wins on the PGA Tour that season.

Watson finished tied for second in the 1985 U.S. Open, missing out on forcing a playoff by one shot, having incurred a two-stroke penalty earlier in the tournament. The penalty was assessed on the eighth hole in the first round, after he had waited longer than the allowed ten seconds for a putt that had hung on the lip of the hole to drop in. The ball did fall into the hole, but the birdie was disallowed and the penalty strokes added. The USGA and The R&A, the sports governing bodies, have since amended the penalty for this rules infraction to just a single stroke. Andy North eventually beat him by one shot.

Watson's career came to a sudden halt when he was injured while playing in the 1985 Goodyear Classic in South Africa. While hitting his ball out of the rough with a 9-iron, he struck a tree stump that had been hidden from view causing damage to his wrist, elbow and neck. He went on to win the tournament, but his problems had just begun. He required surgery on his wrist and neck, and was initially told that he would never play again. He did, but was unable to consistently reach the high standard that he had previously attained and after several more operations he retired towards the end of the 1990s.

After turning fifty, Watson joined the Champions Tour, and began to rediscover competitive form. He won the 2007 Senior PGA Championship at Kiawah Island, a senior major, by two strokes over Argentina's Eduardo Romero, his first win in 21 years. He was voted the 2007 Champions Tour Rookie of the Year.

== Amateur wins ==
- 1975 Coupa El Rincon, Colombia (team with George Harvey and individual)

== Professional wins (10) ==
=== PGA Tour wins (3) ===
No.	Date	Tournament	Winning score	To par	Margin of victory	Runner-up
1	12 Aug 1984	Buick Open	70-70-63-68=271	−17	1 stroke	(United States) Payne Stewart
2	26 Aug 1984	NEC World Series of Golf	69-62-70-70=271	−9	2 strokes	(United States) Bruce Lietzke
3	23 Sep 1984	Panasonic Las Vegas Invitational	69-66-68-70-68=341	−15	1 stroke	(United States) Andy Bean

PGA Tour playoff record (0–1)

No.	Year	Tournament	Opponents	Result
1	1982	Bay Hill Classic	(United States) Tom Kite, (United States) Jack Nicklaus	Kite won with birdie on first extra hole

=== Southern Africa Tour wins (3) ===
No.	Date	Tournament	Winning score	To par	Margin of victory	Runner(s)-up
1	28 Feb 1981	Asseng Champion of Champions	64-68-67-71=270	−18	4 strokes	(South Africa) Gavan Levenson, (Zimbabwe) Mark McNulty
2	19 Feb 1982	Holiday Inns Pro-Am	70-64-65-69=268	−20	4 strokes	(South Africa) Fulton Allem
3	21 Dec 1985	Goodyear Classic	71-70-72-69=282	−2	1 stroke	(South West Africa) Trevor Dodds, (South Africa) David Frost

Southern Africa Tour playoff record (0–2)

No.	Year	Tournament	Opponent(s)	Result
1	1979	Zimbabwe-Rhodesia Open	(South Africa) Simon Hobday	Lost to par on second extra hole
2	1980	Zimbabwe Open	(South Africa) Hugh Baiocchi, (South Africa) Allan Henning	Baiocchi won with birdie on first extra hole

=== Champions Tour wins (4) ===
Legend
Senior major championships (1)
Other Champions Tour (3)

No.	Date	Tournament	Winning score	To par	Margin of victory	Runner(s)-up
1	27 May 2007	Senior PGA Championship	71-71-69-68=279	−9	2 strokes	(Argentina) Eduardo Romero
2	26 Aug 2007	Boeing Classic	69-69-69=207	−9	Playoff	(United States) R. W. Eaks, (United States) David Eger, (United States) Gil Morgan, (Japan) Naomichi Ozaki, (United States) Dana Quigley, (United States) Craig Stadler
3	16 Mar 2008	AT&T Champions Classic	73-71-65=209	−7	Playoff	(United States) Brad Bryant, (United States) Loren Roberts
4	4 May 2008	FedEx Kinko's Classic	67-70-69=206	−10	1 stroke	(United States) Scott Hoch, (United States) Tim Simpson, (Zimbabwe) Nick Price

Champions Tour playoff record (2–0)

No.	Year	Tournament	Opponents	Result
1	2007	Boeing Classic	(United States) R. W. Eaks, (United States) David Eger, (United States) Gil Morgan, (Japan) Naomichi Ozaki, (United States) Dana Quigley, (United States) Craig Stadler	Won with eagle on second extra hole Eger, Morgan, Ozaki and Quigley eliminated by birdie on first hole
2	2008	AT&T Champions Classic	(United States) Brad Bryant, (United States) Loren Roberts	Won with birdie on third extra hole Bryant eliminated by birdie on second hole

== Playoff record ==
Other playoff record (0–1)

No.	Year	Tournament	Opponent	Result
1	1984	Tallahassee Open	(United States) Kermit Zarley	Lost to bogey on fourth extra hole

== Results in major championships ==
Tournament	1979	1980	1981	1982	1983	1984	1985	1986	1987	1988	1989
Masters Tournament							T53	CUT	T27		
U.S. Open							T2	T12	T36	CUT	
The Open Championship	T41	CUT		T15	WD		T47	CUT			
PGA Championship				CUT		33	T40	71	T40	T48	

Tournament	1990	1991	1992	1993	1994	1995	1996	1997	1998	1999
Masters Tournament										
U.S. Open			WD							
The Open Championship										
PGA Championship										

Tournament	2000	2001	2002	2003	2004	2005	2006	2007
Masters Tournament								
U.S. Open								
The Open Championship								
PGA Championship								CUT

Top 10
Did not play

CUT = missed the half-way cut (3rd round cut in 1980 Open Championship)
WD = withdrew
"T" = tied

=== Summary ===
Tournament	Wins	2nd	3rd	Top-5	Top-10	Top-25	Events	Cuts made
Masters Tournament	0	0	0	0	0	0	3	2
U.S. Open	0	1	0	1	1	2	5	3
The Open Championship	0	0	0	0	0	1	6	3
PGA Championship	0	0	0	0	0	0	7	5
Totals	0	1	0	1	1	3	21	13

- Most consecutive cuts made – 5 (twice)
- Longest streak of top-10s – 1

== Senior major championships ==
=== Wins (1) ===
Year	Championship	Winning score	Margin	Runner-up
2007	Senior PGA Championship	−9 (71-71-69-68=279)	2 strokes	(Argentina) Eduardo Romero

=== Results timeline ===
Results not in chronological order before 2012.

Tournament	2007	2008	2009	2010	2011	2012
Senior PGA Championship	1	T26	CUT	CUT	CUT	DQ
The Tradition	T9	T52	T50	61	T45	62
Senior Players Championship	T31	T27	72	T11		
U.S. Senior Open	T5	T52	T52	T53		
Senior British Open Championship	T16		T8	T41		

Win
Top 10
Did not play

CUT = missed the halfway cut
DQ = Disqualified
"T" indicates a tie for a place

== Team appearances ==
Amateur

- Eisenhower Trophy (representing Rhodesia): 1974
- Coupa El Rincon, Colombia (representing Rhodesia): 1975 (winners and individual winner)

== Awards and honors ==
- Watson was awarded Rhodesian Sportsman of the Year in 1975.
- Watson was voted 2007 Champions Tour Rookie of the Year.

== See also ==
- Spring 1981 PGA Tour Qualifying School graduates
