= Bert Elkin =

English footballer and golfer

Personal information
- Full name: Bertie Henry West Elkin
- Date of birth: 14 January 1886
- Place of birth: Neasden, England
- Date of death: 3 June 1962 (aged 76)
- Place of death: Cape Town, South Africa
- Position: Right back

Senior career*
| Years | Team | Apps | (Gls) |
| – | Fulham | | |
| – | Luton Town | | |
| 1908–1909 | Stockport County | 47 | (0) |
| 1909–1910 | Tottenham Hotspur | 26 | (0) |
- * Club domestic league appearances and goals

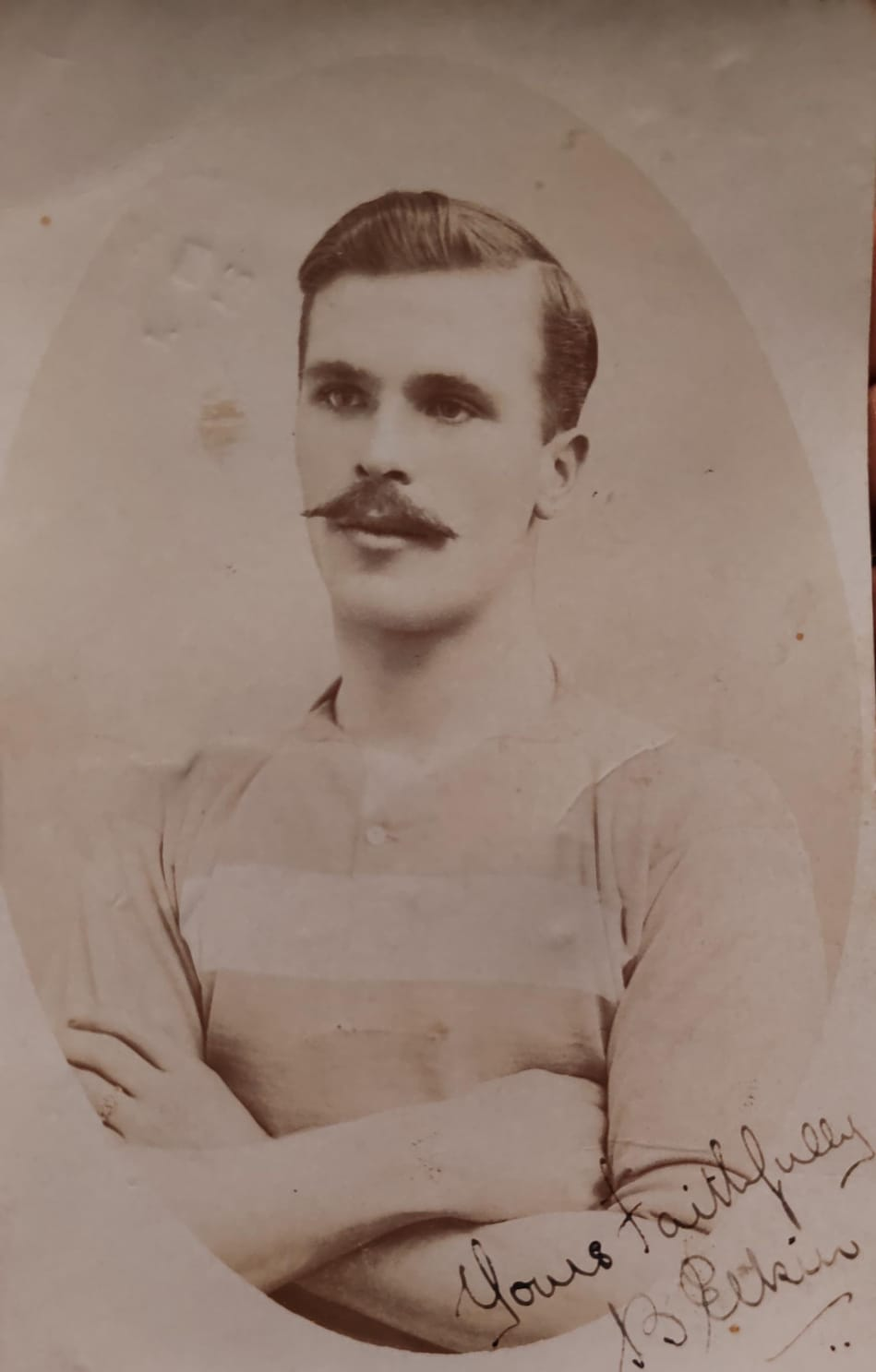
Portrait of Bert Elkin

Bertie Henry West Elkin (14 January 1886 – 3 June 1962) was a professional footballer and golfer. He played football for Fulham, Luton Town, Stockport County and Tottenham Hotspur. Later he emigrated to South Africa and became a professional golfer.

== Football career ==
Elkin had spells at Fulham and Luton before joining Stockport County where he played 47 matches between 1908 and 1909. The right back signed for Tottenham Hotspur in 1909 and went on to feature in 27 matches in all competitions for the Lilywhites.

== Golf career ==
Elkin emigrated to South Africa in September 1911 and became a professional golfer. He won the 1923 South African Professional Match Play Championship, the 1924 South African Open and the 1926 Transvaal Open. He was twice the losing finalist in the South African Professional Match Play Championship, in 1934 and 1940, the latter at the age of 54.
