= Trustbank Tournament of Champions =

South Africa golf tournament

Tournament information
- Location: Johannesburg, South Africa
- Established: 1985
- Course(s): Kensington Golf Club
- Tour(s): Sunshine Tour
- Format: Stroke play
- Final year: 1992

Final champion
- Bobby Lincoln

The Trustbank Tournament of Champions was a professional golf tournament that was held in South Africa between 1985 and 1992. It was played at Kensington Golf Club in Johannesburg and was a fixture on the South African Tour, being the season ending event from 1986 to 1991.

== Winners ==
Year	Winner	Country	Score	Margin of victory	Runner(s)-up	Ref
1992	Bobby Lincoln	South Africa	270 (−18)	1 stroke	(South Africa) Ernie Els	
1991	John Bland	South Africa	269 (−19)	7 strokes	(South Africa) Justin Hobday	
1990	Trevor Dodds	Namibia	272 (−16)	1 stroke	(United States) Fran Quinn	
1989	Jay Townsend	United States	275 (−13)	2 strokes	(United States) Bruce Vaughan	
1988	John Bland	South Africa	268 (−20)	4 strokes	(Canada) Philip Jonas (Zimbabwe) Mark McNulty	
1987	Mark McNulty	Zimbabwe	271 (−17)	4 strokes	(South Africa) Gavan Levenson	
1986	Mark McNulty	Zimbabwe	272 (−12)	6 strokes	(United States) Jack Ferenz (Zimbabwe) Tony Johnstone	
1985	Simon Hobday	South Africa	280	1 stroke	(United States) Jack Ferenz	

== See also ==
- Holiday Inns Champion of Champions
