= Ian Palmer (golfer) =

South African professional golfer

Personal information
- Full name: Ian Stanley Palmer
- Nationality: South Africa
- Born: 13 July 1957 (age 69) Uitenhage, South Africa
- Height: 1.83 m (6 ft 0 in)
- Weight: 85 kg (187 lb; 13.4 st)
- Spouse: Louise (m. 1987)
- Children: 2

Career
- Sport: Golf
- Turned professional: 1981
- Former tours: European Tour; Sunshine Tour; European Senior Tour
- Professional wins: 5

Number of wins by tour
- European Tour: 2
- Sunshine Tour: 1
- Other: 2

Best results in major championships
- Masters Tournament: DNP
- PGA Championship: DNP
- U.S. Open: DNP
- The Open Championship: CUT: 1983, 1992

Ian Stanley Palmer (born 13 July 1957) is a South African professional golfer.

== Career ==
Palmer was born in Uitenhage.

In 1981, Palmer turned professional. He has won the 1985 PAN AM Wild Coast Sun Classic and the 1991 Nissan Challenge on the Southern Africa Tour. He also played on the European Tour for several years, winning the 1992 Johnnie Walker Asian Classic and the 1993 Jersey European Airways Open. He finished a career best 45th on the European Tour Order of Merit in each of those two seasons.

== Professional wins (4) ==
=== European Tour wins (2) ===
No.	Date	Tournament	Winning score	Margin of victory	Runner(s)-up
1	2 Feb 1992	Johnnie Walker Asian Classic	−20 (66-67-67-68=268)	1 stroke	(Germany) Bernhard Langer, (Australia) Brett Ogle, (Northern Ireland) Ronan Rafferty
2	20 Jun 1993	Jersey European Airways Open	−20 (68-67-70-63=268)	2 strokes	(Scotland) Sam Torrance

=== Southern Africa Tour wins (1) ===
No.	Date	Tournament	Winning score	Margin of victory	Runner-up
1	17 Mar 1985	Wild Coast Classic	−3 (68-69-70-70=277)	1 stroke	(South Africa) John Bland

Southern Africa Tour playoff record (0–2)

No.	Year	Tournament	Opponent	Result
1	1989	Palabora Classic	(United States) Stuart Smith	Lost to birdie on first extra hole
2	1998	Vodacom Series (Eastern Cape)	(South Africa) Sammy Daniels	Lost to birdie on third extra hole

=== Other South African wins (2) ===
- 1989 State Mines Open
- 1991 Nissan Challenge

== Results in major championships ==
Tournament	1983	1984	1985	1986	1987	1988	1989	1990	1991	1992
The Open Championship	CUT									CUT

Note: Palmer only played in The Open Championship.

Did not play

CUT = missed the half-way cut
