= Fore Inventors Only =

Fore Inventors Only is a reality TV series that airs nationally on the Golf Channel, featuring different inventors who are trying to successfully sell their golf-related inventions. Just like the TV show American Inventor, the contestants compete against one another in a series of eliminations. The show's host is Vince Cellini.

The inventions range from devices that help with putting to designer "skins" that can be wrapped around one's golf clubs.

The program has been renewed for a second season by the Golf Channel and is currently encouraging interested contestants to apply for the show.
