= Simon Hobday =

South African professional golfer

Personal information
- Full name: Simon Forbes Newbold Hobday
- Nickname: Scruffy
- Nationality: Zambia (until 1969); Rhodesia (1969–1977); South Africa (1977–2017)
- Born: 23 June 1940 Mafikeng, South Africa
- Died: 2 March 2017 (aged 76)
- Height: 5 ft 11 in (1.80 m)
- Weight: 170 lb (77 kg; 12 st)

Career
- Sport: Golf
- Turned professional: 1969
- Former tours: European Tour; Southern Africa Tour; Champions Tour
- Professional wins: 17

Number of wins by tour
- European Tour: 2
- Sunshine Tour: 5
- PGA Tour Champions: 5
- Other: 5

Best results in major championships
- Masters Tournament: DNP
- PGA Championship: DNP
- U.S. Open: CUT: 1995
- The Open Championship: T19: 1983

Simon Forbes Newbold Hobday (23 June 1940 – 2 March 2017) was a South African professional golfer who won tournaments on three continents.

== Early life ==
Hobday was born in the British Embassy in Mafikeng, South Africa. Both of his parents were from England.

== Amateur career ==
Hobday lived part of his life in Zambia and represented the country in the 1966 Eisenhower Trophy. In early 1969, he was still an amateur golfer and still represented Zambia. At the time, he worked as a car salesman in Lusaka, the capital of Zambia.

In April 1969, while still an amateur, Hobday played the Kenya Open. In the final round he broke the course record at the Muthaiga Golf Course with a 66 (−6) to leap into second place. At 284 (−4) he finished joint runner-up with Scotland's Bernard Gallacher, five behind champion Maurice Bembridge. He defeated several notable professionals including Christy O'Connor Snr and Australia's Bob Tuohy.

== Professional career ==
In 1969, Hobday turned professional. He spent his regular career mainly on the Southern Africa Tour, where he won six times and the European Tour, where he won the 1976 German Open and the 1979 Madrid Open.

In 1977, the British government froze his earnings on the British PGA because London had "political and sporting sanctions with Rhodesia." As a response, Hobday changed his sporting nationality from Rhodesia to South Africa. In 1981, he "quit the European tour." That year, he also moved from Zimbabwe to South Africa. He began work at Wingate Park Club in Pretoria, South Africa.

As a senior, he played mainly in the United States on the Senior PGA Tour (now Champions Tour), where he claimed five titles between 1993 and 1995 including one senior major, the 1994 U.S. Senior Open.

== Professional wins (17) ==
=== European Tour wins (2) ===
No.	Date	Tournament	Winning score	Margin of victory	Runner(s)-up
1	15 Aug 1976	German Open	−18 (67-68-65-66=266)	1 stroke	(Spain) Antonio Garrido
2	29 Apr 1979	Madrid Open	−3 (67-73-71-74=285)	2 strokes	(Spain) Francisco Abreu, (England) Gordon J. Brand, (South Africa) Tienie Britz

=== Southern Africa Tour wins (5) ===
No.	Date	Tournament	Winning score	Margin of victory	Runner-up
1	4 Nov 1978	Rhodesian Dunlop Masters	−16 (68-69-69-66=272)	4 strokes	(Rhodesia) Tony Johnstone (a)
2	11 Nov 1978	Victoria Falls Classic	−5 (74-73-73-69=287)	1 stroke	(South Africa) Phil Simmons
3	11 Nov 1979	Zimbabwe-Rhodesia Open	−13 (69-71-65-70=275	Playoff	(Zimbabwe Rhodesia) Denis Watson
4	28 Nov 1981	ICL International	−16 (68-64-70-70=272)	7 strokes	(South Africa) John Bland
5	2 Mar 1985	Trustbank Tournament of Champions	−10 (68-70-68-72=278)	2 strokes	(United States) Jack Ferenz

Southern Africa Tour playoff record (1–0)

No.	Year	Tournament	Opponent	Result
1	1979	Zimbabwe-Rhodesia Open	(Zimbabwe Rhodesia) Denis Watson	Won with par on second extra hole

=== Other wins (1) ===
- 1971 South African Open

=== Senior PGA Tour wins (5) ===
Legend
Senior major championships (1)
Tour Championships (1)
Other Senior PGA Tour (3)

No.	Date	Tournament	Winning score	Margin of victory	Runner(s)-up
1	4 Jul 1993	Kroger Senior Classic	−11 (67-69-66=202)	1 stroke	(United States) Gibby Gilbert, (United States) Mike Hill, (United States) Bob Reith
2	12 Dec 1993	Hyatt Senior Tour Championship	−17 (64-68-67=199)	2 strokes	(United States) Raymond Floyd, (United States) Larry Gilbert
3	3 Jul 1994	U.S. Senior Open	−10 (66-67-66-75=274)	1 stroke	(United States) Jim Albus, (Australia) Graham Marsh
4	4 Sep 1994	GTE Northwest Classic	−7 (70-69-70=209)	Playoff	(United States) Jim Albus
5	17 Sep 1995	Brickyard Crossing Championship	−12 (71-65-68=204)	1 stroke	(Japan) Isao Aoki, (United States) Hale Irwin, (United States) Bob Murphy, (United States) Lee Trevino

Senior PGA Tour playoff record (1–0)

No.	Year	Tournament	Opponent	Result
1	1994	GTE Northwest Classic	(United States) Jim Albus	Won with birdie on third extra hole

=== Other senior wins (4) ===
- 1997/98 Vodacom Senior Classic (South Africa)
- 2001 Nelson Mandela Invitational (with Martin Maritz), Liberty Mutual Legends of Golf - Legendary Division (with Jim Albus)
- 2003 Nelson Mandela Invitational (with Lee Westwood)

== Results in major championships ==
Tournament	1971	1972	1973	1974	1975	1976	1977	1978	1979
U.S. Open									
The Open Championship	WD				T28	T21	CUT	T52	T30

Tournament	1980	1981	1982	1983	1984	1985	1986	1987	1988	1989
U.S. Open										
The Open Championship	T51			T19	CUT	CUT				

Tournament	1990	1991	1992	1993	1994	1995
U.S. Open						CUT
The Open Championship						

Note: Hobday never played in the Masters Tournament or the PGA Championship.

Did not play

WD = withdrew
CUT = missed the half-way cut (3rd round cut in 1977 and 1984 Open Championships)
"T" indicates a tie for a place

== Champions Tour major championships ==
=== Wins (1) ===
Year	Championship	Winning score	Margin	Runners-up
1994	U.S. Senior Open	−10 (66-67-66-75=274)	1 stroke	(United States) Jim Albus, (Australia) Graham Marsh

== Team appearances ==
Amateur

- Eisenhower Trophy (representing Zambia): 1966

Professional

- Double Diamond International (representing the Rest of the World): 1976, 1977

== See also ==
- List of African golfers
