= Wayne Westner =

South African golfer

Personal information
- Full name: Wayne Brett Westner
- Nickname: Westy
- Nationality: South Africa
- Born: 28 September 1961 Johannesburg, South Africa
- Died: 4 January 2017 (aged 55) Pennington, KwaZulu-Natal, South Africa
- Height: 1.80 m (5 ft 11 in)
- Weight: 82 kg (181 lb; 12.9 st)
- Spouse: Alison Jean Westner

Career
- Sport: Golf
- Turned professional: 1982
- Former tours: European Tour; Sunshine Tour
- Professional wins: 13
- Highest ranking: 43 (18 July 1993)

Number of wins by tour
- European Tour: 2
- Sunshine Tour: 7
- Other: 5

Best results in major championships
- Masters Tournament: DNP
- PGA Championship: DNP
- U.S. Open: T50: 1996
- The Open Championship: T34: 1993

Achievements and awards
- Southern Africa Tour Order of Merit winner: 1995–96

Wayne Brett Westner (28 September 1961 – 4 January 2017) was a South African golfer. He was twice winner of the South African Open and also won twice on the European Tour. In partnership with Ernie Els, they won the 1996 World Cup of Golf, played at the Erinvale Golf Club near Cape Town. Els won the individual event with Westner second and the pair won the team event by 18 shots.

== Early life ==
Westner was born in Johannesburg.

== Professional career ==
In 1981, he turned professional. He won several events in his home country, including two South African Opens. He spent many years on the European Tour where he won two tournaments and had a best Order of Merit finish of twentieth in 1993. In the 1992 Carroll's Irish Open, he lost to Nick Faldo at the fourth hole of a sudden-death playoff. In partnership with Ernie Els, they won the 1996 World Cup of Golf for South Africa. Westner finished second, behind Els, in the individual event and the pair won the team event by 18 shots. He won the Sunshine Tour Order of Merit in 1995/96.

At the 1998 Madeira Island Open, during the pre-tournament Pro-Am, Westner tore ankle ligaments after falling over six feet when a railway sleeper crumbled under him. He played only once more that season, and was never able to recover. He later ran his own golf college, The Wayne Westner Golf College.

== Personal life ==
As of 1991, Westner was a born-again Christian.

Westner died by suicide in Pennington, KwaZulu-Natal, on 4 January 2017.

== Professional wins (13) ==
=== European Tour wins (2) ===
No.	Date	Tournament	Winning score	Margin of victory	Runner-up
1	31 Jan 1993	Dubai Desert Classic	−14 (69-66-69-70=274)	2 strokes	(South Africa) Retief Goosen
2	25 Feb 1996	FNB Players Championship^{1}	−18 (66-67-67-70=270)	1 stroke	(Argentina) José Cóceres

^{1}Co-sanctioned by the Southern Africa Tour

European Tour playoff record (0–1)

No.	Year	Tournament	Opponent	Result
1	1992	Carroll's Irish Open	(England) Nick Faldo	Lost after concession on fourth extra hole

=== Southern Africa Tour wins (7) ===
No.	Date	Tournament	Winning score	Margin of victory	Runner(s)-up
1	5 Feb 1983	ICL Tournament Players Classic	−15 (71-66-68-68=273)	1 stroke	(South Africa) Allan Henning
2	31 Jan 1988	Southern Suns South African Open	−13 (69-70-65-71=275)	2 strokes	(England) Ian Mosey
3	2 Feb 1991	Protea Assurance South African Open (2)	−16 (65-70-69-68=272)	4 strokes	(England) Mark James, (Zimbabwe) Tony Johnstone
4	9 Feb 1991	AECI Charity Classic	−15 (69-69-70-65=273)	3 strokes	(United States) Tommy Tolles
5	28 Jan 1996	San Lameer South African Masters	−8 (69-68-70-73=280)	3 strokes	(United States) Patrick Moore, (South Africa) Warren Schutte, (South Africa) Chris Williams
6	4 Feb 1996	Nashua Wild Coast Sun Classic	−12 (66-68-69-65=268)	4 strokes	(United States) Michael Christie, (United States) Greg Petersen
7	25 Feb 1996	FNB Players Championship^{1}	−18 (66-67-67-70=270)	1 stroke	(Argentina) José Cóceres

^{1}Co-sanctioned by the European Tour

Southern Africa Tour playoff record (0–2)

No.	Year	Tournament	Opponent	Result
1	1987	AECI Charity Classic	(Zimbabwe) Mark McNulty	Lost to birdie on first extra hole
2	1996	Hollard Royal Swazi Sun Classic	(South Africa) Richard Kaplan	

=== Other South African wins (4) ===
- 1989 Southern Africa Tour Winter Championship
- 1990 PX Pro-Celebrity Classic, Sun City Classic
- 1992 Wild Coast Sun Classic

=== Other wins (1) ===
No.	Date	Tournament	Winning score	Margin of victory	Runners-up
1	24 Nov 1996	World Cup of Golf (with (South Africa) Ernie Els)	−29 (136-144-130-137=547)	18 strokes	United States − Steve Jones and Tom Lehman

== Results in major championships ==
Tournament	1983	1984	1985	1986	1987	1988	1989	1990	1991	1992	1993	1994	1995	1996	1997
U.S. Open														T50	
The Open Championship	CUT			CUT	71			CUT			T34	CUT		CUT	CUT

Note: Westner never played in the Masters Tournament nor the PGA Championship.

Did not play

CUT = missed the half-way cut
"T" = tied

== Team appearances ==
- Dunhill Cup (representing South Africa): 1994, 1996
- World Cup (representing South Africa): 1994, 1996 (winners), 1997
- Alfred Dunhill Challenge (representing Southern Africa): 1995 (winners)
