= Allan Henning =

South African professional golfer

Personal information
- Nationality: South Africa
- Born: 1 June 1944 (age 82) Johannesburg, South Africa
- Height: 1.89 m (6 ft 2 in)
- Weight: 81 kg (179 lb; 12.8 st)

Career
- Sport: Golf
- Turned professional: 1962
- Former tour: Southern Africa Tour
- Professional wins: 20

Number of wins by tour
- Sunshine Tour: 7
- Other: 13

Best results in major championships
- Masters Tournament: DNP
- PGA Championship: DNP
- U.S. Open: DNP
- The Open Championship: T30: 1966

Achievements and awards
- Southern Africa Tour Order of Merit winner: 1974–75, 1975–76

Allan Henning (born 1 June 1944) is a South African former professional golfer.

== Early life ==
Henning was born into a golfing family. His brothers Harold, Brian, and Graham all became professional golfers.

== Professional career ==
Henning turned professional in 1962. He won a number of tournaments on the South African Tour during the 1960s and 1970s. His biggest win was the South African Open when it was played twice in 1963. Henning also had four playoff losses and three runner up positions in the South African Open.

In 1966, Henning secured playing privileges to play on the PGA Tour at PGA Tour Qualifying School.

Henning won the Sunshine Tour Order of Merit in two consecutive seasons, in 1974/75 and 1975/76. He represented South Africa in World Cup of Golf and World Series of Golf. Henning was also the first to score a record 61 at the Toro Classic played at Glendower GC in 1976.

As a senior, Henning won the South African Senior Championships three times and the Senior Order of Merit three times. He recorded a further nine victories on the now defunct Paradym Tour.

== Professional wins (20) ==
=== Southern African Tour wins (7) ===
No.	Date	Tournament	Winning score	Margin of victory	Runner-up
1	22 Dec 1974	Rhodesian Dunlop Masters	−6 (70-71-69=210) (Note: Shortened to 54 holes due to weather.)	2 strokes	(South Africa) Dale Hayes
2	18 Jan 1975	Rolux Toro Classic	−18 (61-70-69-70=270)	3 strokes	(South Africa) Dale Hayes
3	10 Jan 1976	Datsun International	−19 (66-70-65-68=269)	3 strokes	(South Africa) Dale Hayes
4	24 Jan 1976	NCR Western Province Open	−6 (71-69-72-70=282)	6 strokes	(South Africa) Hugh Baiocchi
5	15 Feb 1976	Rhodesian Dunlop Masters (2)	−9 (71-70-69-69=279)	Playoff	(South Africa) Hugh Baiocchi
6	6 Nov 1977	Rhodesian Dunlop Masters (3)	−12 (67-70-68-71=276)	Playoff	(South Africa) Bobby Cole
7	26 Jan 1980	Orkney Open	−15 (67-71-68-67=273)	2 strokes	(South Africa) Bobby Cole

Southern Africa Tour playoff record (2–3)

No.	Year	Tournament	Opponent(s)	Result
1	1973	ICL Transvaal Open	(South Africa) John Fourie	Lost to par on ninth extra hole
2	1976	Rhodesian Dunlop Masters	(South Africa) Hugh Baiocchi	Won with par on third extra hole
3	1977	Rhodesian Dunlop Masters	(South Africa) Bobby Cole	
4	1980	Zimbabwe Open	(South Africa) Hugh Baiocchi, (Zimbabwe) Denis Watson	Baiocchi won with birdie on first extra hole
5	1981	Holiday Inns Pro-Am	(England) Nigel Burch, (England) Ian Mosey	Mosey won with birdie on first extra hole

=== Other wins (13) ===
- 1963 South African Open
- 1965 Western Province Open
- 1966 Rhodesian Dunlop Masters
- 1967 Transvaal Open, Kalahari Classic
- 1968 Dunlop South African Masters
- 1970 Schoeman Park Open, Bata Bush Babes Tournament, Flame Lily Tournament
- 1994 South African Seniors
- 1998 John Bland Invitational, Vodacom Senior Series: Welkom
- 2000 Nelson Mandela Invitational (with Retief Goosen)

== Team appearances ==
- World Cup (representing South Africa): 1970
- Datsun International (representing South Africa): 1976 (winners)

== See also ==
- 1966 PGA Tour Qualifying School graduates
