= Gavan Levenson =

South African professional golfer (born 1953)

Personal information
- Full name: Gavan Neil Levenson
- Nationality: South Africa
- Born: 18 December 1953 (age 72) Johannesburg, South Africa
- Height: 1.87 m (6 ft 2 in)

Career
- Sport: Golf
- Turned professional: 1978
- Former tours: PGA Tour; European Tour; Southern Africa Tour; European Seniors Tour
- Professional wins: 8

Number of wins by tour
- European Tour: 2
- Sunshine Tour: 5
- European Senior Tour: 1

Best results in major championships
- Masters Tournament: DNP
- PGA Championship: CUT: 1984
- U.S. Open: CUT: 1983, 1984
- The Open Championship: T36: 1984

Achievements and awards
- Southern Africa Tour Order of Merit winner: 1983–84

Gavan Neil Levenson (born 18 December 1953) is a South African professional golfer.

== Early life and amateur career ==
Levenson was born in Johannesburg. He represented South Africa in the 1976 Eisenhower Trophy and won several major amateur tournaments including the French and Rhodesian Open Amateur Championships in 1978.

== Professional career ==
In 1978, Levenson turned professional and joined the European Tour the following year. He won the Belgian Open and finishing in 29th place on the Order of Merit in his rookie season.

After two seasons in Europe, Levenson qualified for the United States-based PGA Tour. He spent four largely unsuccessful years on the tour, only recording one top ten finish when he tied for 4th place at the 1982 Greater Hartford Open. He returned to Europe in 1985, and although he consistently finished inside the top 100 on the Order of Merit, he did not win again on the European Tour until the 1991 Open de Baleares.

Levenson also played on the Southern Africa Tour during the Northern Hemisphere winters. He won five titles in South Africa, including one South African Open Championship and one South African PGA Championship, and topped the Order of Merit in 1983/84.

Since turning fifty, Levenson has played on the European Seniors Tour, where he has one victory, achieved in just his second tournament, the 2004 DGM Barbados Open.

== Amateur wins ==
- 1975 South African Amateur Stroke-Play Championship
- 1978 French Amateur Open Championship, Rhodesian Amateur Open Championship

== Professional wins (8) ==
=== European Tour wins (2) ===
No.	Date	Tournament	Winning score	Margin of victory	Runner(s)-up
1	10 Jun 1979	Belgian Open	−5 (68-71-68-72=279)	3 strokes	(South Africa) Bobby Cole, (England) Nick Faldo, (England) Michael King
2	10 Mar 1991	Open de Baleares	−6 (72-74-67-69=282)	1 stroke	(England) Steven Richardson

=== Southern Africa Tour wins (5) ===
No.	Date	Tournament	Winning score	Margin of victory	Runner-up
1	12 Feb 1983	Sigma Vaal Reefs Open	−14 (75-67-70-62=274)	2 strokes	(Zimbabwe) Nick Price
2	4 Feb 1984	Lexington PGA Championship	−9 (70-66-68-67=271)	3 strokes	(Zimbabwe) Nick Price
3	26 Jan 1985	South African Open	−8 (69-68-72-71=280)	3 strokes	(South Africa) Phil Simmons
4	19 Jan 1986	ICL International	−18 (71-65-67-67=270)	1 stroke	(South Africa) David Frost
5	13 Jan 1990	ICL International (2)	−19 (67-68-66-68=269)	2 strokes	(South Africa) Wayne Westner

=== European Seniors Tour wins (1) ===
No.	Date	Tournament	Winning score	Margin of victory	Runners-up
1	28 Mar 2004	DGM Barbados Open	−12 (69-64-71=204)	2 strokes	(England) Denis Durnian, (England) Carl Mason

== Results in major championships ==
Tournament	1975	1976	1977	1978	1979
U.S. Open					
The Open Championship	CUT				CUT
PGA Championship					

Tournament	1980	1981	1982	1983	1984	1985	1986	1987	1988	1989
U.S. Open				CUT	CUT					
The Open Championship	CUT				T36			CUT		79
PGA Championship					CUT					

Tournament	1990	1991
U.S. Open		
The Open Championship	CUT	T57
PGA Championship		

Note: Levenson never played in the Masters Tournament.

Did not play

CUT = missed the half-way cut
"T" = tied

== Team appearances ==
Amateur

- Commonwealth Tournament (representing South Africa): 1975
- Eisenhower Trophy (representing South Africa): 1976

== See also ==
- Spring 1981 PGA Tour Qualifying School graduates
- 1983 PGA Tour Qualifying School graduates
