= Goodyear Classic =

The Goodyear Classic was a golf tournament on the South African Tour from the 1984 to 1992. It was generally held in December but in the 1989/1990 season it was held in February. The event was held at Humewood Golf Club in Port Elizabeth, South Africa.

== Winners ==
- 1984 (South Africa) John Bland
- 1985 (Zimbabwe) Denis Watson
- 1986 (Zimbabwe) Tony Johnstone
- 1987 (South Africa) John Bland
- 1988 (South West Africa) Trevor Dodds
- 1990 (Feb) (Canada) Philip Jonas
- 1990 (Dec) (South Africa) Fulton Allem
- 1991 (South Africa) Justin Hobday
- 1992 (South Africa) Ernie Els
