= John Bland (golfer) =

South African professional golfer (1945–2023)

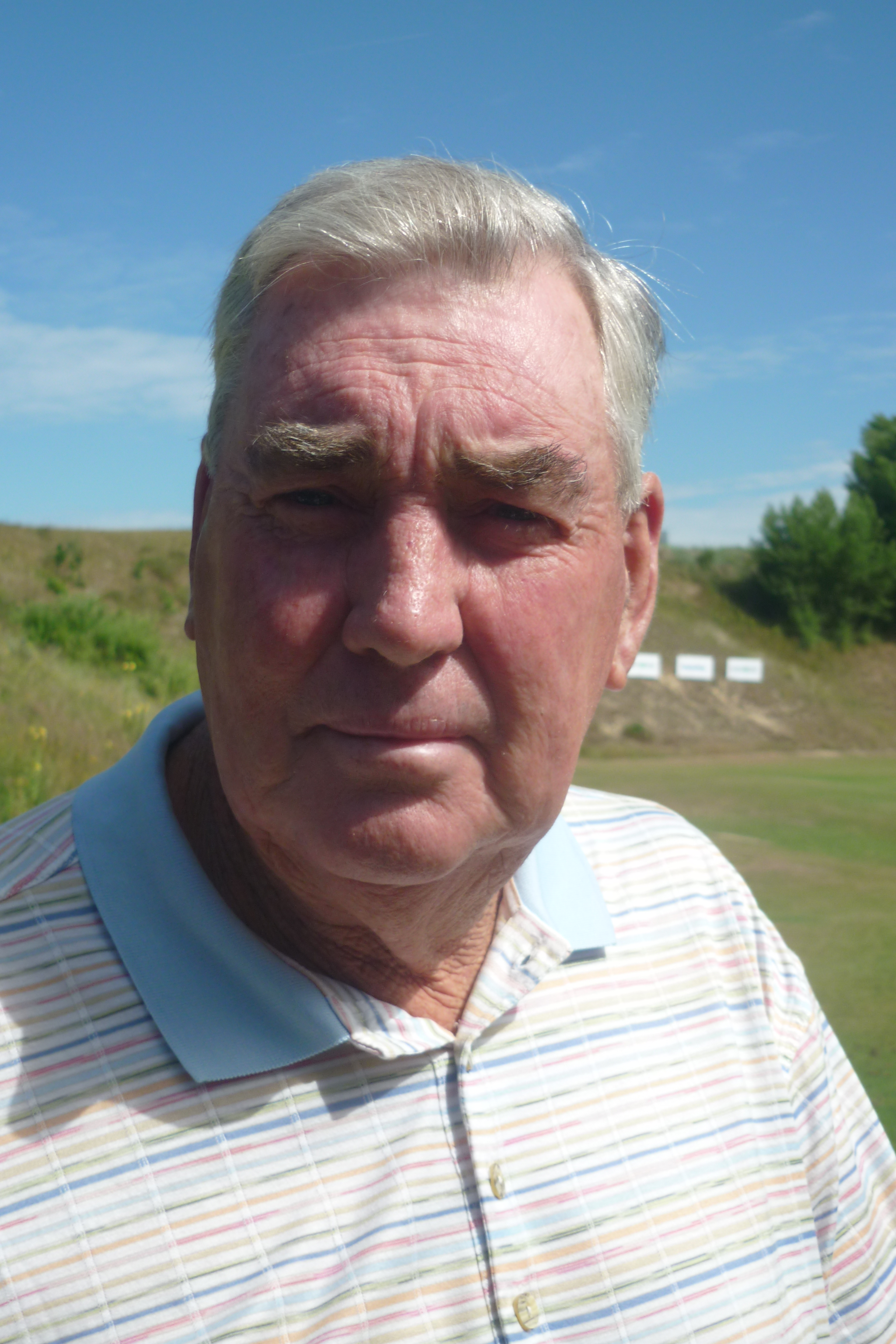
- Bland at the 2010 Dutch Senior Open

Personal information
- Full name: John Louis Bland
- Nationality: South Africa
- Born: 22 September 1945 Johannesburg, Transvaal, South Africa
- Died: 9 May 2023 (aged 77) George, Western Cape, South Africa
- Height: 1.75 m (5 ft 9 in)
- Weight: 73 kg (161 lb; 11.5 st)

Career
- Sport: Golf
- Turned professional: 1969
- Former tours: European Tour; Sunshine Tour; Champions Tour; European Senior Tour
- Professional wins: 36
- Highest ranking: 49 (28 April 1991)

Number of wins by tour
- European Tour: 2
- Sunshine Tour: 19
- Challenge Tour: 1
- PGA Tour Champions: 5
- European Senior Tour: 3
- Other: 6

Best results in major championships
- Masters Tournament: DNP
- PGA Championship: DNP
- U.S. Open: DNP
- The Open Championship: T16: 1980

Achievements and awards
- Southern Africa Tour Order of Merit winner: 1977–78, 1987–88, 1989–90, 1990–91
- Senior PGA Tour Rookie of the Year: 1996

John Louis Bland (22 September 1945 – 9 May 2023) was a South African professional golfer who won more than thirty professional tournaments around the world.

== Early life and career ==
Bland was born in Johannesburg, Union of South Africa. Turning professional in 1969, he was a leading player on the Southern African Tour for over twenty years. He spent the northern summers playing on the European Tour, where he won twice. He was a more consistent contender than this tally might suggest, as he finished in the top-20 on the Order of Merit six times.

After reaching the age of fifty in 1995, Bland played mainly on the United States-based Champions Tour. He won five tournaments on the tour, including four in 1996, when he finished third on the money list. He has also won three tournaments on the European Senior Tour.

== Death ==
Bland died after battling cancer in George, Western Cape, South Africa, on 9 May 2023, at the age of 77.

== Professional wins (36) ==
=== European Tour wins (2) ===
No.	Date	Tournament	Winning score	Margin of victory	Runner-up
1	21 Aug 1983	Benson & Hedges International Open	−15 (68-70-67-68=273)	1 stroke	(West Germany) Bernhard Langer
2	20 Apr 1986	Suze Open	−12 (68-71-70-67=276)	4 strokes	(Spain) Seve Ballesteros

=== Southern Africa Tour wins (19) ===
Legend
Tour Championships (2)
Other Southern Africa Tour (17)

No.	Date	Tournament	Winning score	Margin of victory	Runner(s)-up
1	22 Oct 1977	Lexington PGA Championship	−5 (68-67-70-70=275)	2 strokes	(South Africa) Gary Player
2	29 Oct 1977	Victoria Falls Classic	−9 (70-69-72-72=283)	3 strokes	(South Africa) John Fourie
3	3 Dec 1977	Holiday Inns Invitational	−23 (67-66-65-67=265)	4 strokes	(South Africa) Bobby Cole
4	7 Feb 1979	Holiday Inns Open (2)	−21 (66-69-65-67=267)	Playoff	(South Africa) Andries Oosthuizen
5	17 Jan 1981	Sigma Series 2	−15 (71-65-70-67=273)	3 strokes	(Zimbabwe) Nick Price
6	24 Jan 1981	Sigma Series 3	−15 (71-66-66-70=273)	1 stroke	(South Africa) Tienie Britz, (Zimbabwe) Nick Price
7	26 Feb 1983	Holiday Inns Pro-Am (3)	−17 (68-65-68-70=271)	2 strokes	(Zimbabwe) Teddy Webber
8	5 Mar 1983	Kodak Golf Classic	−17 (65-67-70-69=271)	Playoff	(United States) David Sann
9	22 Dec 1984	Goodyear Classic	−11 (68-69-72-68=277)	Playoff	(Zimbabwe) Nick Price
10	20 Dec 1987	Goodyear Classic (2)	−3 (71-69-72-69=281)	2 strokes	(South Africa) Mark Wiltshire
11	13 Mar 1988	Trustbank Tournament of Champions	−20 (67-66-67-68=268)	3 strokes	(Canada) Philip Jonas, (Zimbabwe) Mark McNulty
12	26 Nov 1988	Safmarine South African Masters	−13 (69-70-63-73=275)	3 strokes	(Zimbabwe) Tony Johnstone
13	7 Jan 1989	Dewar's White Label Trophy	−15 (70-66-71-66=273)	1 stroke	(Zimbabwe) Tony Johnstone
14	3 Mar 1990	Dewar's White Label Trophy (2)	−14 (64-70-71-69=274)	1 stroke	(United States) Jay Townsend
15	17 Nov 1990	Minolta Copiers Match Play	−2 (70)	5 strokes	(South Africa) Hugh Baiocchi
16	15 Dec 1990	Bloemfontein Classic	−15 (65-67-73-68=273)	6 strokes	(South Africa) Hugh Baiocchi
17	12 Jan 1991	Palabora Classic	−10 (70-69-68-71=278)	1 stroke	(South Africa) Mark Wiltshire
18	23 Feb 1991	Bell's Cup	−11 (68-67-71-71=277)	1 stroke	(South Africa) Retief Goosen
19	2 Mar 1991	Trustbank Tournament of Champions (2)	−19 (62-71-70-66=269)	7 strokes	(South Africa) Justin Hobday

Southern Africa Tour playoff record (3–1)

No.	Year	Tournament	Opponent(s)	Result
1	1979	Holiday Inns Open	(South Africa) Andries Oosthuizen	Won with par on fifth extra hole
2	1981	Datsun South African Open	(England) Warren Humphreys, (South Africa) Gary Player	Player won with birdie on third extra hole after 18-hole playoff; Player: −2 (70), Bland: −2 (70), Humphreys: E (72)
3	1983	Kodak Golf Classic	(United States) David Sann	Won with par on third extra hole
4	1984	Goodyear Classic	(Zimbabwe) Nick Price	Won with birdie on first extra hole

=== Challenge Tour wins (1) ===
No.	Date	Tournament	Winning score	Margin of victory	Runner-up
1	22 Jun 1991	Martini Open	−18 (270)	3 strokes	(England) Jon Evans

=== Other wins (2) ===
- 1970 Transvaal Open
- 1976 Holiday Inns Champion of Champions

=== Senior PGA Tour wins (5) ===
No.	Date	Tournament	Winning score	Margin of victory	Runner(s)-up
1	22 Oct 1995	Ralphs Senior Classic	−12 (69-67-65=201)	1 stroke	(United States) Jim Colbert
2	21 Jan 1996	Puerto Rico Senior Tournament of Champions	−9 (69-68-70=207)	1 stroke	(United States) Jim Colbert
3	2 Jun 1996	Bruno's Memorial Classic	−8 (67-70-71=208)	Playoff	(United States) John Paul Cain, (United States) Kermit Zarley
4	18 Aug 1996	Northville Long Island Classic	−14 (70-66-66=202)	3 strokes	(United States) Jim Colbert
5	13 Oct 1996	The Transamerica	−12 (69-69-66=204)	1 stroke	(United States) Jim Colbert

Senior PGA Tour playoff record (1–1)

No.	Year	Tournament	Opponent(s)	Result
1	1996	Bruno's Memorial Classic	(United States) John Paul Cain, (United States) Kermit Zarley	Won with bogey on third extra hole Zarley eliminated by par on second hole
2	1997	Senior British Open	(South Africa) Gary Player	Lost to birdie on second extra hole

=== European Senior Tour wins (3) ===
No.	Date	Tournament	Winning score	Margin of victory	Runner(s)-up
1	1 Oct 1995	London Masters	−6 (70-69-71=210)	4 strokes	(England) Tony Grubb, (South Africa) Hugh Inggs, (England) John Morgan, (South Africa) Bobby Verwey
2	9 Aug 2009	Bad Ragaz PGA Seniors Open	−11 (65-69-65=199)	Playoff	(United States) Bob Boyd
3	20 Jun 2010	Ryder Cup Wales Seniors Open	−8 (69-68-71=208)	1 stroke	(Paraguay) Ángel Franco, (South Africa) Chris Williams

European Senior Tour playoff record (1–1)

No.	Year	Tournament	Opponent	Result
1	1997	Senior British Open	(South Africa) Gary Player	Lost to birdie on second extra hole
2	2009	Bad Ragaz PGA Seniors Open	(United States) Bob Boyd	Won with birdie on second extra hole

=== Other senior wins (4) ===
- 1997 Liberty Mutual Legends of Golf (with Graham Marsh), Franklin Templeton Senior South African Open
- 1998 Franklin Templeton Senior South African Open
- 2010 Liberty Mutual Legends of Golf – Raphael Division (with Graham Marsh)

== Results in major championships ==
Tournament	1977	1978	1979	1980	1981	1982	1983	1984	1985	1986	1987	1988	1989	1990	1991
The Open Championship	CUT	T52	CUT	T16	CUT	CUT	CUT	CUT	CUT	CUT	CUT	CUT	CUT	T53	T80

Note: Bland only played in The Open Championship.
CUT = missed the half-way cut (3rd round cut in 1979, 1981, 1982, 1983 and 1984 Open Championships)
"T" = tied

== Team appearances ==
- World Cup (representing South Africa): 1975
- Hennessy Cognac Cup (representing the Rest of the World): 1982
- Dunhill Cup (representing South Africa): 1991, 1992
