= Sunshine Tour =

Professional golf tour

- Current season, competition or edition: 2026–27 Sunshine Tour
- Formerly: Sunshine Circuit; South African Tour; Southern Africa Tour; Vodacom Tour; FNB Tour
- Sport: Golf
- Founded: 1971 (rebranded as the Sunshine Tour in 2000)
- Commissioner: Thomas Abt
- Countries: Based in South Africa (Note: Schedules have also included events in Botswana, Eswatini, Kenya, Mauritius, Namibia, Rwanda, Zambia and Zimbabwe.)
- Most titles: Order of Merit titles: (Zimbabwe) Mark McNulty (8); Tournament wins: (Zimbabwe) Mark McNulty (33)
- Broadcaster: SuperSport
- Related competitions: Big Easy Tour
- Website: http://www.sunshinetour.com

The Sunshine Tour is a men's professional golf tour based in Southern and East Africa. For much of its early history it was known either as the Southern Africa Tour or Sunshine Circuit; through sponsorship deals, it has also been known as the FNB Tour and the Vodacom Tour. For the 2000–01 season the tour rebranded itself as the Sunshine Tour in an attempt to broaden its appeal. A large majority of the tour events are still staged in South Africa.

== History and status ==
The tour is one of the six leading men's tours which before 2009 made up the membership of the International Federation of PGA Tours, but it offers much less prize money than some of the leading tours, and leading Southern African golfers traditionally prefer to play on the PGA Tour or the European Tour if they can qualify to do so, typically returning to play in Sunshine Tour events a couple of times a year.

Most of the tour's leading official money events, including the South African Open, are co-sanctioned with the European Tour to attract stronger fields. The 2015 season included 27 official money events. The co-sanctioned events had purses ranging from €1,000,000 to US$6,500,000, while the other 21 events had purses designated in South African Rand and ranging from 650,000 rand to 4.5 million rand. There was at least one tournament every month of the year except July, but the main events took place in the South African summer from November to February.

In accordance with the apartheid policy of the governments of Southern Africa, the tour was only open to White players for its first 20 years. The tour has been open to non-White players since 1991. Five black golfers have won events: South Africa's John Mashego at the 1991 Bushveld Classic; South Africa's Lindani Ndwandwe at the 2001 Western Cape Classic and 2009 Highveld Classic; Zimbabwe's Tongoona Charamba at the 2006 SAA Pro-Am Invitational and 2008 MTC Namibia PGA Championship; Zambia's Madalitso Muthiya at the 2016 Vodacom Origins of Golf (Wild Coast); and South Africa's Toto Thimba Jr. at the 2019 KCB Karen Masters.

In 2016, the Sunshine Tour announced an affiliation with the MENA Golf Tour, allowing the top five MENA Tour players Sunshine Tour cards and those 6th-15th into the final stage of Q School. A number of events would also be co-sanctioned among the Sunshine Tour, MENA Tour, and developmental Big Easy Tour.

In May 2022, it was announced that the Order of Merit would be reformatted for the 2022–23 season. It was sponsored by Luno, a cryptocurrency platform. The rankings changed to a points-based system, rather than being decided on money earned. Points earned are based on tournament prize money which are split into five tiers. The leader of the OoM will receive R 500,000; paid in Bitcoin.

Since 2022, the top three players on the Order of Merit at the end of the season earn status to play on the European Tour for the following season.

== Order of Merit winners ==
Season	Winner	Points
2025–26	(South Africa) Casey Jarvis	4,863
2024–25	(South Africa) Daniel van Tonder	4,155
2023–24	(South Africa) Ryan van Velzen	3,525
2022–23	(South Africa) Ockie Strydom	3,336
Season	Winner	Prize money (R)
2021–22	(South Africa) Shaun Norris	4,890,994
2020–21	(South Africa) Christiaan Bezuidenhout	7,789,088
2019–20	(South Africa) J. C. Ritchie	2,162,387
2018–19	(South Africa) Zander Lombard	2,119,985
2017–18	(South Africa) George Coetzee (2)	2,937,226
2016–17	(South Africa) Brandon Stone	7,384,889
2015	(South Africa) George Coetzee	5,470,684
2014	(South Africa) Thomas Aiken	4,057,642
2013	(South Africa) Dawie van der Walt	5,094,333
2012	(South Africa) Branden Grace	2,760,319
2011	(South Africa) Garth Mulroy	3,464,463
2010	(South Africa) Charl Schwartzel (4)	5,097,914
2009	(Denmark) Anders Hansen	4,286,038
2008	(South Africa) Richard Sterne	5,599,265
2007	(South Africa) James Kingston	1,980,689
2006–07	(South Africa) Charl Schwartzel (3)	1,585,117
2005–06	(South Africa) Charl Schwartzel (2)	1,207,460
2004–05	(South Africa) Charl Schwartzel	1,635,850
2003–04	(South Africa) Darren Fichardt (2)	726,545
2002–03	(South Africa) Trevor Immelman	2,044,280
2001–02	(South Africa) Tim Clark	1,669,901
2000–01	(Zimbabwe) Mark McNulty (8)	1,603,481
1999–2000	(South Africa) Darren Fichardt	558,735
1998–99	(South Africa) David Frost	1,189,762
1997–98	(Zimbabwe) Mark McNulty (7)	589,053
1996–97	(Zimbabwe) Nick Price (2)	1,223,027
1995–96	(South Africa) Wayne Westner	709,389
1994–95	(South Africa) Ernie Els (2)	460,488
1993–94	(Zimbabwe) Tony Johnstone (2)	297,359
1992–93	(Zimbabwe) Mark McNulty (6)	250,079
1991–92	(South Africa) Ernie Els	324,017
1990–91	(South Africa) John Bland (4)	333,637
1989–90	(South Africa) John Bland (3)	180,893
1988–89	(Zimbabwe) Tony Johnstone	254,950
1987–88	(South Africa) John Bland (2)	143,301
1986–87	(Zimbabwe) Mark McNulty (5)	134,690
1985–86	(Zimbabwe) Mark McNulty (4)	113,527
1984–85	(Zimbabwe) Mark McNulty (3)	57,750
1983–84	(South Africa) Gavan Levenson	43,940
1982–83	(Zimbabwe) Nick Price	31,986
1981–82	(Zimbabwe) Mark McNulty (2)	67,054
1980–81	(Zimbabwe) Mark McNulty	50,192
1979–80	(South Africa) Gary Player (2)	49,680
1978–79	(South Africa) Hugh Baiocchi	19,804
1977–78	(South Africa) John Bland	25,171
1976–77	(South Africa) Gary Player	19,363
1975–76	(South Africa) Allan Henning (2)	18,275
Season	Winner	Points
1974–75	(South Africa) Allan Henning	1,833
1973–74	(South Africa) Bobby Cole	1,664
1972–73	(South Africa) Dale Hayes	1,252
1971–72	(South Africa) Tienie Britz	1,604

=== Multiple winners ===
Rank	Player	Wins	Years won
1	(Zimbabwe) Mark McNulty	8	1980–81, 1981–82, 1984–85, 1985–86, 1986–87, 1992–93, 1997–98, 2000–01
2	(South Africa) John Bland	4	1977–78, 1987–88, 1989–90, 1990–91
2	(South Africa) Charl Schwartzel	4	2004–05, 2005–06, 2006–07, 2010
T4	(South Africa) George Coetzee	2	2015, 2017–18
T4	(South Africa) Ernie Els	2	1991–92, 1994–95
T4	(South Africa) Darren Fichardt	2	1999–2000, 2003–04
T4	(South Africa) Allan Henning	2	1974–75, 1975–76
T4	(Zimbabwe) Tony Johnstone	2	1988–89, 1993–94
T4	(South Africa) Gary Player	2	1976–77, 1979–80
T4	(Zimbabwe) Nick Price	2	1982–83, 1996–97

== Awards ==
Season	Players' Player of the Year	Rookie of the Year
2025–26	(South Africa) Herman Loubser	(Mexico) Luis Carrera
2024–25	No award	(South Africa) Altin van der Merwe
2023–24	No award	(South Africa) Robin Williams
2022–23	No award	(South Africa) Casey Jarvis
2021–22	No award	(South Africa) Jayden Schaper (2)
2020–21	No award	(South Africa) Jayden Schaper
2019–20	No award	(South Africa) Garrick Higgo
2018–19	No award	(Zimbabwe) Benjamin Follett-Smith
2017–18	(South Africa) Oliver Bekker	(Republic of Ireland) Neil O'Briain
2016–17	Unknown	(South Africa) Christiaan Bezuidenhout
2015	(South Africa) Dean Burmester	(South Africa) Rourke van der Spuy
2014	Unknown	(South Africa) Haydn Porteous
2013	(South Africa) Darren Fichardt	(South Africa) Dylan Frittelli
2012	(South Africa) Trevor Fisher Jnr	(South Africa) Daniel van Tonder
2011	(South Africa) Jean Hugo	(South Africa) Allan Versfeld
2010	(South Africa) Jaco van Zyl	(South Africa) Anthony Michael
2009	Unknown	(Canada) Graham DeLaet
2008	Unknown	(South Africa) Louis Moolman
2007	Unknown	(England) Ross McGowan
2006–07	Unknown	(South Africa) Rossouw Loubser
2005–06	Unknown	(South Africa) Mohamed Tayob
2004–05	Unknown	(Wales) Garry Houston
2003–04	Unknown	(Sweden) Johan Edfors
2002–03	Unknown	(South Africa) Charl Schwartzel
2001–02	Unknown	(South Africa) Nicholas Lawrence
2000–01	Unknown	(South Africa) Trevor Immelman
1999–2000	Unknown	(South Africa) Jean Hugo
1998–99	Unknown	Unknown
1997–98	Unknown	(South Africa) Richard Fulford
1996–97	Unknown	Unknown
1995–96	Unknown	(Scotland) Alan McLean
1994–95	Unknown	Unknown
1993–94	Unknown	(South Africa) Brenden Pappas
