= 1974–75 Southern Africa Tour =

Golf tour season

1974–75 Southern Africa Tour season
- Duration: 13 November 1974 – 9 February 1975
- Number of official events: 10
- Most wins: (South Africa) John Fourie (2) (South Africa) Allan Henning (2) (South Africa) Gary Player (2)
- Order of Merit: (South Africa) Allan Henning

The 1974–75 Southern Africa Tour was the fourth season of the Southern Africa Tour, the main professional golf tour in South Africa since it was formed in 1971.

== Season outline ==
Dale Hayes and Gary Player had the most success at the beginning of the season. In the inaugural Beck's PGA Championship, Hayes shot a course record 65 (−5) in the second round to take a three shot lead. Player, however, shot a 66 to move into second place. Player again shot a 66 in the final round but Hayes closed with rounds of 69-69 to defeat him by one shot. The following week, Hayes represented South Africa at the unofficial 1974 World Cup in South America. His teammate was Bobby Cole. Their team won the event. Player, meanwhile, won the concurrently played General Motors International Classic, an official event on tour. He defeated Andries Oosthuizen by one shot.

The remainder of the season saw Henning and Fourie gain much success. At the third event, the NCR Western Province Open; Fourie held the lead after the first two rounds. Henning grabbed the 54-hole lead though he was overtaken by American Bill Brask. Henning and Fourie, however, shared second place. At the fifth event, the Rhodesian Dunlop Masters; Henning won, defeating Hayes by two shots. Fourie finished joint third, three back. Fourie came back and won the next week, the Vavasseur Natal Open, defeating Henning and Vin Baker by one. Henning finished runner-up the following week too, at the BP South African Open, only behind Gary Player. At the final event, the Holiday Inns Invitational; Fourie finished joint runner-up with Hayes. They outplayed Henning who finished joint fifth. Due to his slightly more consistent play through the season, though, Henning narrowly won the Order of Merit. Hayes finished second and Fourie third.

== Schedule ==
The following table lists official events during the 1974–75 season.

Date	Tournament	Location	Purse (R)	Winner (Note: The number in brackets after each winner's name is the number of Southern Africa Tour events they had won up to and including that tournament. This information is only shown for Southern Africa Tour members.)	Notes
16 Nov	Beck's PGA Championship	Transvaal	35,000	(South Africa) Dale Hayes (8)	
23 Nov	General Motors International Classic	Cape	20,000	(South Africa) Gary Player (7)	
30 Nov	NCR Western Province Open	Cape	15,000	(United States) Bill Brask (n/a)	
14 Dec	ICL Transvaal Open	Transvaal	16,000	(South Africa) Vin Baker (1)	
22 Dec	Rhodesian Dunlop Masters	Rhodesia	Rh$10,000	(South Africa) Allan Henning (1)	
11 Jan	Vavasseur Natal Open	Natal	15,000	(South Africa) John Fourie (5)	
18 Jan	Rolux Toro Classic	Transvaal	16,000	(South Africa) Allan Henning (2)	New tournament
25 Jan	Dunlop South African Masters	Transvaal	18,000	(South Africa) John Fourie (6)	
1 Feb	BP South African Open	Cape	20,000	(South Africa) Gary Player (8)	
9 Feb	Holiday Inns Invitational	Swaziland	12,000	(Republic of Ireland) John O'Leary (1)	

== Order of Merit ==
The Order of Merit was based on tournament results during the season, calculated using a points-based system.

Position	Player	Points
1	(South Africa) Allan Henning	1,833
2	(South Africa) Dale Hayes	1,747
3	(South Africa) John Fourie	1,671
4	(South Africa) Vin Baker	1,050
5	(South Africa) Hugh Baiocchi	987
