= 1972–73 Southern Africa Tour =

Golf tour season

1972–73 Southern Africa Tour season
- Duration: 22 November 1972 – 24 February 1973
- Number of official events: 13
- Most wins: (South Africa) Dale Hayes (3)
- Order of Merit: (South Africa) Dale Hayes

The 1972–73 Southern Africa Tour was the second season of the Southern Africa Tour, the main professional golf tour in South Africa since it was formed in 1971.

== Season outline ==
The first event of the season was the Luyt Lager PGA Championship in November 1972. In the third round, Harold Henning "romped to a five stroke lead." In the final round, Hugh Baiocchi shot a five-under-par 65 to get into contention. However, Henning managed to secure a one shot win. Gary Player recorded a third-place result. However, Player came back and won the following week at the Dunlop South African Masters with a 268 total, defeating Henning by one shot. It was his third straight win at the event.

In addition, at the Dunlop South African Masters, Bobby Cole recorded a joint third place finish. This precipitated much success for Cole over the next month. On 9 December, he won the Natal Open. He followed it up with a second consecutive win, this time at the Rhodesian Dunlop Masters. The following week, he finished runner-up at the Ellerines Team Championship (an unofficial money event), with team-mate Dale Hayes.

A number of golfers had success after the Christmas break. Dale Hayes had continued success, winning the first tournament after break, the Holiday Inns Open in Swaziland. Hugh Baiocchi won the subsequent event, the NCR Western Province Open. England's Peter Oosterhuis was in contention to win the following event; the ICL Transvaal Open. He shot a third round 68 (−3) to take the 54-hole lead. However, John Fourie was victorious. At the following week's Rothmans International Matchplay, Oosterhuis responded with a victory, defeating Gary Player 6 and 5. Fourie, meanwhile, won his second consecutive tournament, winning the concurrently played Rothmans International Strokeplay.

The Order of Merit title was between Hayes and Baiocchi. At the 11th tournament; the General Motors International Classic, Baiocchi and Hayes were tied at 282. Baiocchi defeated Hayes in a sudden-death playoff. The following week, Hayes responded with a victory at the Corlett Drive Classic, shooting a course record 65 in the final round. At the final tournament of the season, Hayes won for the second consecutive week at the Schoeman Park Open. The back-to-back wins helped him secure the Order of Merit over Fourie and Baiocchi by a small margin.

== Schedule ==
The following table lists official events during the 1972–73 season.

Date	Tournament	Location	Purse (R)	Winner (Note: The number in brackets after each winner's name is the number of Southern Africa Tour events they had won up to and including that tournament. This information is only shown for Southern Africa Tour members.)	Notes
25 Nov	Luyt Lager PGA Championship	Transvaal	25,000	(South Africa) Harold Henning (2)	
2 Dec	Dunlop South African Masters	Transvaal	15,000	(South Africa) Gary Player (4)	
9 Dec	Natal Open	Natal	10,000	(South Africa) Bobby Cole (2)	
17 Dec	Rhodesian Dunlop Masters	Rhodesia	Rh$10,000	(South Africa) Bobby Cole (3)	
7 Jan	Holiday Inns Open	Swaziland	5,000	(South Africa) Dale Hayes (2)	
13 Jan	NCR Western Province Open	Cape	14,000	(South Africa) Hugh Baiocchi (1)	
20 Jan	ICL Transvaal Open	Transvaal	15,000	(South Africa) John Fourie (2)	
27 Jan	Rothmans International Matchplay	Transvaal	25,000	(England) Peter Oosterhuis (3)	New tournament
27 Jan	Rothmans International Strokeplay	Natal	5,000	(South Africa) John Fourie (3)	New tournament
3 Feb	BP South African Open	Natal	16,000	(New Zealand) Bob Charles (n/a)	
10 Feb	General Motors International Classic	Cape	15,000	(South Africa) Hugh Baiocchi (2)	
17 Feb	Corlett Drive Classic	Transvaal	10,000	(South Africa) Dale Hayes (3)	New tournament
24 Feb	Schoeman Park Open	Orange Free State	10,000	(South Africa) Dale Hayes (4)	

=== Unofficial events ===
The following events were sanctioned by the Southern Africa Tour, but did not carry official money, nor were wins official.

Date	Tournament	Location	Purse (R)	Winners	Notes
23 Dec	Ellerines Team Championship	Transvaal	10,000	(South Africa) Graham Henning and (South Africa) Harold Henning	Team event

== Order of Merit ==
The Order of Merit was based on tournament results during the season, calculated using a points-based system.

Position	Player	Points
1	(South Africa) Dale Hayes	1,252
2	(South Africa) John Fourie	1,183
3	(South Africa) Hugh Baiocchi	1,149
4	(South Africa) Harold Henning	1,007
5	(South Africa) Bobby Cole	970
