= 1977–78 Southern Africa Tour =

Golf tour season

1977–78 Southern Africa Tour season
- Duration: 19 October 1977 – 3 December 1977
- Number of official events: 6
- Most wins: (South Africa) John Bland (3)
- Order of Merit: (South Africa) John Bland

The 1977–78 Southern Africa Tour was the seventh season of the Southern Africa Tour, the main professional golf tour in South Africa since it was formed in 1971.

== Season outline ==
The season was dominated by John Bland and Gary Player. Bland won the first two events however Player won the consecutive events in the middle of the season to close in on Order of Merit honors. Bland, however, won the final event, the Holiday Inns Invitational, to capture the Order of Merit.

The season was dominated by John Bland and Gary Player. Bland won the first two events however Player won the consecutive events in the middle of the season to close in on Order of Merit honors. Bland, however, won the final event, the Holiday Inns Invitational, to capture the Order of Merit.

South African John Bland had much success at the beginning of the season. He won the first event of the year, the Lexington PGA Championship, by two shots over joint runner-up Player. The following week, he also won the Victoria Falls Classic.

Later in the season, Player had much success. In November, he played the Yellow Pages South African Open which held at Royal Johannesburg Golf Club. He shot a course-record 63 in the third round which helped him take a three shot lead over Dale Hayes. He went on to defeat Hayes and Bobby Cole by the same margin. He also won the ICL International the following week. Bland, however, won the final event, the Holiday Inns Invitational. This helped him secure the Order of Merit title over Player.

== Schedule ==
The following table lists official events during the 1977–78 season.

Date	Tournament	Location	Purse (R)	Winner (Note: The number in brackets after each winner's name is the number of Southern Africa Tour events they had won up to and including that tournament. This information is only shown for Southern Africa Tour members.)	Notes
22 Oct	Lexington PGA Championship	Transvaal	50,000	(South Africa) John Bland (1)	
29 Oct	Victoria Falls Classic	Rhodesia	50,000	(South Africa) John Bland (2)	New to Southern Africa Tour
6 Nov	Rhodesian Dunlop Masters	Rhodesia	Rh$14,000	(South Africa) Allan Henning (6)	
12 Nov	Yellow Pages South African Open	Transvaal	40,000	(South Africa) Gary Player (13)	
19 Nov	ICL International	Transvaal	25,000	(South Africa) Gary Player (14)	
3 Dec	Holiday Inns Invitational	Swaziland	20,000	(South Africa) John Bland (3)	

== Order of Merit ==
The Order of Merit was based on prize money won during the season, calculated in South African rand.

Position	Player	Prize money (R)
1	(South Africa) John Bland	25,171
2	(South Africa) Gary Player	21,450
3	(South Africa) Bobby Cole	18,150
4	(South Africa) John Fourie	11,480
5	(South Africa) Dale Hayes	11,399
