= Natal Open =

Tournament information
- Established: 1925
- Tour(s): Southern African Tour
- Format: Stroke play
- Month played: January
- Final year: 1975

Tournament record score
- Aggregate: 277 Bobby Cole (Dec 1972)

Final champion
- (South Africa) John Fourie

The Natal Open was a golf tournament in South Africa. It was organised by the Natal Golf Union and ran from 1925 through to 1975. In latter years it was included within the Southern African Tour's Order of Merit. During the mid-20th century, major champions Bobby Locke and Gary Player had much success, winning several times each. In the 1960s, the tournament received international media coverage as Sewsunker Sewgolum, an Indian South African, controversially was allowed to enter the event and won it twice. In the final years of the Natal Open, Bobby Cole dominated, winning four times.

== History ==
The early years of the tournament were dominated by the Brews brothers, Jock Brews and Sid Brews, who won the first four tournaments. In 1935, a young Bobby Locke won the Natal Open. He repeated the following year. Due to his amateur status, he also won he amateur division of the event too. In the late 1950s, a young Gary Player had much success at the event. In 1958, Player won the event defeating runner-up Trevor Wilkes by five shots. Locke and Harold Henning finished a further shot back. The following year, Player defeated Locke in a 36-hole playoff, 135-142.

In the 1960s, the tournament was dominated by coverage of colored golfer Sewsunker Sewgolum. Sewgolum, recent back-to-back champion of the Dutch Open, had his application for entry into the 1961 event rejected. However, in 1963, Sewgolum was allowed to participate in the tournament. He won the event, defeating Denis Hutchinson and Bobby Verwey by a stroke. Sewgolum earned a 400 pound cheque and a silver trophy. He had to accept these prizes outside in the rain, however, due to the country's racial discrimination laws prohibiting non-whites from the clubhouse. Sewgolum's win and discriminatory victory celebration received international media attention, including from The New York Times. He became the first non-white person "to win a sanctioned golf tournament in competition with whites" in South Africa. Sewgolum also won the event two years later, defeating Gary Player and Harold Henning. Once again he had to accept his prizes outside of the clubhouse.

The later years of the tournament were dominated by Bobby Cole. In 1969, he defeated Peter Oosterhuis by a shot. Cole repeated as champion. The following year, Cole was tied for the third-round lead with Terry Westbrook. Cole shot a final round 69 but was overtaken by Westbrook's 68. He finished solo runner-up. Cole, however, came back and won the following year, in December 1972. Cole again repeated as champion a year and a half later.

In December 1975, the Natal Open scheduled for the following year was cancelled. New owners of tournament sponsors, Vavasseur International, withdrew support for the event, and the Natal Golf Union were unable to find a replacement.

== Winners ==
Year	Winner	Score	Margin of victory	Runner(s)-up	Ref.
Natal Open
1925	(South Africa) Jock Brews				
1926	(South Africa) Sid Brews				
1927	(South Africa) Sid Brews (2)				
1928	No tournament				
1929	(South Africa) Sid Brews (3)				
1930-34	No tournament				
1935	(South Africa) Bobby Locke (a)				
1936	(South Africa) Bobby Locke (a) (2)		1 stroke	(South Africa) Sid Brews	
1937	(South Africa) Sid Brews (4)				
1938	(South Africa) Otway Hayes (a)				
1939	(South Africa) Jock Verwey				
1940-45	No tournament due to World War II				
1946	(South Africa) Otway Hayes (2)				
1947	(South Africa) Eric Moore				
1948	(South Africa) Otway Hayes (3)				
1949	No tournament				
1950	(South Africa) George Van Niekerk	299			
1951	(South Africa) Sandy Guthrie	279			
1952	(South Africa) Sandy Guthrie (2)	291			
1953	(South Africa) Bobby Locke (3)				
1954	(South Africa) Bruce Keyter (a)				
1955	(South Africa) Denis Hutchinson (a)				
1956	(South Africa) Harold Henning	289			
1957	(South Africa) Bruce Keyter	286			
1958	(South Africa) Gary Player	289	5 strokes	(South Africa) Trevor Wilkes	
1959	(South Africa) Gary Player (2)		Playoff (Note: Player defeated Locke 135-142 in a 36-hole playoff.)	(South Africa) Bobby Locke	
1960	(South Africa) Gary Player (3)	282			
1961	(South Africa) Harold Henning	278	Playoff (Note: Henning defeated Brookes 141-144 in a 36-hole playoff.)	(South Africa) Alan Brookes	
1962	(Scotland) Stewart Davies	285			
1963 (Jan)	(South Africa) Sewsunker Sewgolum	293	1 stroke	(South Africa) Denis Hutchinson (South Africa) Bobby Verwey	
1963 (Dec)	(South Africa) Cedric Amm	291	Playoff (Note: Amm defeated Verwey in a 36-hole playoff.)	(South Africa) Bobby Verwey	
1965	(South Africa) Sewsunker Sewgolum (2)	285	1 stroke	(South Africa) Gary Player (South Africa) Harold Henning	
1966	(South Africa) Gary Player (4)	286	2 strokes	(South Africa) Cobie Legrange	
1967	(South Africa) Cobie Legrange	281	1 stroke	(South Africa) Bobby Verwey	
1968	(South Africa) Gary Player (5)	281	6 strokes	(South Africa) Cobie Legrange	
1969	(South Africa) Bobby Cole	282	1 stroke	(England) Peter Oosterhuis	
1970	(South Africa) Bobby Cole (2)	285	1 stoke	(South Africa) Cobie Legrange	
1971	(South Africa) Terry Westbrook	283	1 stroke	(South Africa) Bobby Cole	
1972 (Jan)	(South Africa) Tienie Britz	282	1 stroke	(Rhodesia) Simon Hobday	
1972 (Dec)	(South Africa) Bobby Cole (3)	277	1 stroke	(South Africa) Dale Hayes	
Vavasseur Natal Open
1974	(South Africa) Bobby Cole (4)	284	1 stroke	(South Africa) Tienie Britz	
1975	(South Africa) John Fourie	281	1 stroke	(South Africa) Hugh Baiocchi (South Africa) David Wren	
~~1976~~	Cancelled				
