= 1971–72 Southern Africa Tour =

Golf tour season

1971–72 Southern Africa Tour season
- Duration: 24 November 1971 – 4 March 1972
- Number of official events: 13
- Most wins: (South Africa) Gary Player (3)
- Order of Merit: (South Africa) Tienie Britz

The 1971–72 Southern Africa Tour was the inaugural season of the Southern Africa Tour, the main professional golf tour in South Africa since it was formed in 1971.

== Season outline ==
According to The Guardian, South Africa's Tienie Britz was "the season's most successful player" though England's Peter Oosterhuis often contended. At the inaugural event, the Luyt Lager PGA Championship, Britz, Oosterhuis, and Rhodesia's Don Gammon finished regulation tied at 280. Britz won the 18-hole playoff, scoring a 67 against Oosterhuis' 70 and Gammon's 71. At the third tournament, the Schoeman Park Open, Oosterhuis was "well placed to win," possessing a three shot lead entering the final round. He shot over-par in the final round though still finished second. The following week, meanwhile, Oosterhuis finally triumphed, defeating Britz by two shots at the Rhodesian Dunlop Masters.

The middle of the season belonged to legend Gary Player though Harold Henning often challenged him. At the Western Province Open, playing against "windy conditions," Player managed to secure an even-par final round to win by four. At the following week's Dunlop South African Masters, Player continued with success, shooting a 267 aggregate to win by three. The following month, at the General Motors International Classic, again playing against "windy conditions," Player "pulled up into second place" with a two-under-par 72, two back of leader Harold Henning. However, Henning outplayed Player by two over the final round; Player finished solo runner-up. The subsequent week was the flagship event, South African Open. Henning again played well, opening with a seven-under-par 66 to tie for the lead. In the third round, however, Player "hit top form" with a 66 to stay on "Henning's heels," one back. Henning then "slipped back" with a final round 72 allowing Player to pass him. Player won the event for the 8th time.

Peter Oosterhuis bookended the season with success contending at the final two tournaments. At the penultimate event, the Holiday Inns Open, he scored a third round 67 (−4) to tie for the lead. Oosterhuis "slipped back" in the final round, only matching par, though still finished in the top five. At the final event, meanwhile, Oosterhuis managed to secure victory, defeating Hugh Baiocchi in a playoff at the Glen Anil Classic. The victory also helped him ensure a top five finish on the Order of Merit. Tienie Britz, meanwhile, managed to shoot a final round 68 to finish in the top ten. This helped him win the Order of Merit by a small margin.

== Schedule ==
The following table lists official events during the 1971–72 season.

Date	Tournament	Location	Purse (R)	Winner (Note: The number in brackets after each winner's name is the number of Southern Africa Tour events they had won up to and including that tournament. This information is only shown for Southern Africa Tour members.)	Notes
27 Nov	Luyt Lager PGA Championship	Transvaal	25,000	(South Africa) Tienie Britz (1)	
4 Dec	Bert Hagerman Invitational	Transvaal	10,000	(South Africa) Dale Hayes (1)	New tournament
11 Dec	Schoeman Park Open	Orange Free State	10,000	(South Africa) Terry Westbrook (1)	
19 Dec	Rhodesian Dunlop Masters	Rhodesia	Rh$10,000	(England) Peter Oosterhuis (1)	
1 Jan	State Mines Open	Transvaal	5,000	(South Africa) John Fourie (1)	New tournament
8 Jan	ICL Transvaal Open	Transvaal	10,000	(South Africa) Bobby Cole (1)	
15 Jan	NCR Western Province Open	Cape	12,000	(South Africa) Gary Player (1)	
22 Jan	Dunlop South African Masters	Transvaal	10,000	(South Africa) Gary Player (2)	
29 Jan	Natal Open	Natal	10,000	(South Africa) Tienie Britz (2)	
5 Feb	General Motors International Classic	Cape	15,000	(South Africa) Harold Henning (1)	
12 Feb	South African Open	Transvaal	15,000	(South Africa) Gary Player (3)	
19 Feb	Holiday Inns Open	Swaziland	10,000	(United States) John Buczek (1)	
4 Mar	Glen Anil Classic	Transvaal	10,000	(England) Peter Oosterhuis (2)	New tournament

=== Unofficial events ===
The following events were sanctioned by the Southern Africa Tour, but did not carry official money, nor were wins official.

Date	Tournament	Location	Purse (R)	Winners	Notes
26 Feb	Ellerines Team Championship	Transvaal	10,000	(South Africa) Graham Henning and (South Africa) Harold Henning	New team event

== Order of Merit ==
The Order of Merit was based on tournament results during the season, calculated using a points-based system.

Position	Player	Points
1	(South Africa) Tienie Britz	1,604
2	(South Africa) John Bland	1,578
3	(South Africa) Hugh Baiocchi	1,571
4	(South Africa) Harold Henning	1,548
5	(England) Peter Oosterhuis	1,498
