= 1976–77 Southern Africa Tour =

Golf tour season

1976–77 Southern Africa Tour season
- Duration: 3 November 1976 – 19 December 1976
- Number of official events: 6
- Most wins: (South Africa) Hugh Baiocchi (3)
- Order of Merit: (South Africa) Gary Player

The 1976–77 Southern Africa Tour was the sixth season of the Southern Africa Tour, the main professional golf tour in South Africa since it was formed in 1971.

== Season outline ==
Hugh Baiocchi and Gary Player had much success throughout the season. Player won two of the first three events and finished runner-up in the other, the Sportsman Lager PGA Championship. However, Baiocchi closed the season with three consecutive wins, including a defeat of Player at the ICL Transvaal International.

Gary Player had much success at the beginning of the season. He won the inaugural event, the Dunlop South African Masters, by four over joint runner-up Hugh Baiocchi. At the Sportsman Lager PGA Championship, the second event of the season, Player finished one shot behind champion Dale Hayes while Baiocchi finished joint third. Player went on to win the subsequent event, the Yellow Pages South African Open. This was his 10th victory of his national open beating the previous record set by Bobby Locke. However, it was Baiocchi who had the most success at the end of the season. He won the final three events, including a defeat of Player at the ICL Transvaal International.

== Schedule ==
The following table lists official events during the 1976–77 season.

Date	Tournament	Location	Purse (R)	Winner (Note: The number in brackets after each winner's name is the number of Southern Africa Tour events they had won up to and including that tournament. This information is only shown for Southern Africa Tour members.)	Notes
6 Nov	Dunlop South African Masters	Transvaal	25,000	(South Africa) Gary Player (11)	
20 Nov	Sportsman Lager PGA Championship	Transvaal	50,000	(South Africa) Dale Hayes (12)	
27 Nov	Yellow Pages South African Open	Natal	35,000	(South Africa) Gary Player (12)	
4 Dec	Holiday Inns Invitational	Swaziland	20,000	(South Africa) Hugh Baiocchi (4)	
11 Dec	ICL International	Transvaal	25,000	(South Africa) Hugh Baiocchi (5)	
19 Dec	Rhodesian Dunlop Masters	Rhodesia	15,000	(South Africa) Hugh Baiocchi (6)	

== Order of Merit ==
The Order of Merit was based on prize money won during the season, calculated in South African rand.

Position	Player	Prize money (R)
1	(South Africa) Gary Player	19,363
2	(South Africa) Hugh Baiocchi	18,938
3	(South Africa) Dale Hayes	15,470
4	(South Africa) Cobie Legrange	9,938
5	(South Africa) Bobby Verwey	8,922
