= Hugh Inggs =

South African professional golfer

Personal information
- Full name: Hugh William Inggs
- Nationality: South Africa
- Born: 15 May 1938 (age 88) Boksburg, South Africa
- Height: 1.83 m (6 ft 0 in)
- Weight: 83 kg (183 lb; 13.1 st)

Career
- Sport: Golf
- Turned professional: 1958
- Former tours: South African Tour; PGA Tour; European Senior Tour
- Professional wins: 2

Hugh William Inggs (born 15 May 1938) is a South African professional golfer.

== Career ==
Inggs was born in Boksburg, South Africa. He started to play golf at the age of 15.

Inggs turned pro at the age of 20. In 1965, he recorded a 3rd-place finish at the South African Open behind Gary Player. In February 1969, he would finish 2nd place to compatriot Graham Henning at the General Motors Open. Although these were good placings they would also prefigure a tough-luck career as Inggs would ultimately record well over a dozen 2nd and 3rd place finishes but would rarely win.

He did, however, finally win a month later in March 1969 at the Rhodesian Masters. Inggs avenged the previous month's defeat to Graham Henning, defeating his fellow South African by a shot. He would successfully defend his title the following year.

In April 1969, Inggs was one of 15 players who qualified for the PGA Tour at Spring 1969 PGA Tour Qualifying School. He made his debut at the Western Open in June and played a number of events, finishing with the Canadian Open at the end of July. In the Minnesota Golf Classic, an event played as an alternative to the 1969 Open Championship, he finished joint runner-up behind champion Frank Beard.

Late in his career, he would play the European Senior Tour from 1992 to 2001. He played part-time for the first three seasons, making little mark, but was much more successful in his fourth season. He finished in the top-10 in half of the eight events he played, including a runner-up at the 1995 London Seniors Masters to fellow South African John Bland. He would finish 13th on that season's Order of Merit. His next best finish would be 3rd place at the 1998 Lawrence Batley Seniors.

== Personal life ==
Inggs married Alma in 1964 and they have two children.

== Professional wins (2) ==
=== Rhodesian circuit wins (2) ===
- 1969 Rhodesian Masters
- 1970 Rhodesian Masters

== See also ==
- Spring 1969 PGA Tour Qualifying School graduates
