= Bruce Keyter =

South African golfer

Personal information
- Full name: Bruce M. Keyter
- Nationality: South Africa
- Born: South Africa

Career
- Sport: Golf
- Turned professional: 1955
- Professional wins: 4

Bruce M. Keyter is a South African professional golfer.

== Career ==
Keyter won the Natal Open as an amateur in 1954. He also won the 1955 South African Amateur Championship.

In 1955, he turned professional. Keyter began his career as an assistant professional at Royal Durban Country Club. His first victory as a pro was at the 1956 Transvaal Open where he defeated South African legend Bobby Locke by a shot. It was a surprising victory; Australia's The Argus noted that it was Locke's first defeat in a big South African tournament in 20 years. Two months later, in April, Keyter was runner-up to Gary Player in the South African Open. A year later, in 1957, he won the Natal Open.

In 1963, Keyter won what was arguably the biggest win of his career at the South African Masters, a triple crown event. He shot 291 (−9) to win by three over Terry Westbrook, Harold Inggs, and Eric Moore. In December, he was runner-up in the South African Open for the second time, two strokes behind Allan Henning.

== Amateur wins ==
- 1955 South African Amateur

== Professional wins (4) ==
- 1954 Natal Open (as an amateur)
- 1956 Transvaal Open
- 1957 Natal Open
- 1963 South African Masters
