= 1973–74 Southern Africa Tour =

Golf tour season

1973–74 Southern Africa Tour season
- Duration: 28 November 1973 – 23 February 1974
- Number of official events: 11
- Most wins: (South Africa) Dale Hayes (3)
- Order of Merit: (South Africa) Bobby Cole

The 1973–74 Southern Africa Tour was the third season of the Southern Africa Tour, the main professional golf tour in South Africa since it was formed in 1971.

== Season outline ==
Dale Hayes had much success at the beginning of the season. He won the second tournament; the Rhodesian Dunlop Masters, shooting under-par every day. At the next tournament; the Rolux Open, Hayes opened with a 64, breaking the course record. He finished with a 68 to win for the second consecutive week. He recorded a runner-up finish at the ICL Transvaal Open, one shot behind Hugh Baiocchi.

After the Christmas break, Bobby Cole found much success. In late January, he won the Vavasseur Natal Open. At the following event; the Dunlop South African Masters, Cole finished runner-up, losing in a playoff to Gary Player. A few days later began the flagship event, the South African Open held at Royal Johannesburg & Kensington Golf Club. In the second round, Cole broke the course record, shooting a 65 (−7) to take the lead. In the final round, Cole broke his own course record, shooting a 64 to secure a four-shot win.

Dale Hayes found form again towards the end of the season. At the penultimate event; the Schoeman Park Open, he finished joint runner-up. At the final event, the Holiday Inns Open, Hayes opened with a course record 64. He ultimately defeated Bob Charles by two shots. It was his third win of the season. Due to his consistent play in the middle of the season, however, Cole won the Order of Merit, narrowly defeating Hayes who finished second.

== Schedule ==
The following table lists official events during the 1973–74 season.

Date	Tournament	Location	Purse (R)	Winner (Note: The number in brackets after each winner's name is the number of Southern Africa Tour events they had won up to and including that tournament. This information is only shown for Southern Africa Tour members.)	Notes
1 Dec	Luyt Lager PGA Championship	Transvaal	35,000	(United States) Tom Weiskopf (n/a)	
9 Dec	Rhodesian Dunlop Masters	Rhodesia	Rh$10,000	(South Africa) Dale Hayes (5)	
15 Dec	Rolux Open	Transvaal	15,000	(South Africa) Dale Hayes (6)	New tournament
22 Dec	ICL Transvaal Open	Transvaal	15,000	(South Africa) Hugh Baiocchi (3)	
12 Jan	NCR Western Province Open	Cape	14,000	(South Africa) John Fourie (4)	
20 Jan	Vavasseur Natal Open	Natal	15,000	(South Africa) Bobby Cole (4)	
26 Jan	Dunlop South African Masters	Transvaal	15,000	(South Africa) Gary Player (5)	
2 Feb	South African Open	Transvaal	18,000	(South Africa) Bobby Cole (5)	
9 Feb	General Motors International Classic	Cape	20,000	(South Africa) Gary Player (6)	
15 Feb	Schoeman Park Open	Orange Free State	10,000	(South Africa) Cobie Legrange (1)	
23 Feb	Holiday Inns Open	Swaziland	10,000	(South Africa) Dale Hayes (7)	

== Order of Merit ==
The Order of Merit was based on tournament results during the season, calculated using a points-based system.

Position	Player	Points
1	(South Africa) Bobby Cole	1,664
2	(South Africa) Dale Hayes	1,570
3	(South Africa) John Fourie	1,454
4	(South Africa) Hugh Baiocchi	1,377
5	(South Africa) Allan Henning	1,320
