= Schoeman Park Open =

Golf tournament in South Africa

Tournament information
- Location: Bloemfontein, South Africa
- Established: 1970
- Course: Schoeman Park Golf Club
- Par: 72
- Tour: Southern Africa Tour
- Format: Stroke play
- Prize fund: R 10,000
- Month played: February
- Final year: 1974

Tournament record score
- Aggregate: 267 Peter Oosterhuis (1971)
- To par: −13 Peter Oosterhuis (1971) −13 Terry Westbrook (1971)

Final champion
- (South Africa) Cobie Legrange

Location map
- Location in South Africa Location in the Orange Free State

The Schoeman Park Open (/ˈskuːmən/) was a golf tournament on the Southern Africa Tour. The inaugural event was played in 1970 and joined the tour schedule in December 1971, being played to the 1973/1974 season. It was held in February or March, except that the 1971/1972 event was held in December. The event was held at Schoeman Park Golf Club in Bloemfontein, South Africa.

== Winners ==
Year	Winner	Score	To par	Margin of victory	Runner(s)-up	Ref.
1974	(South Africa) Cobie Legrange	281	−7	2 strokes	(South Africa) Dale Hayes (South Africa) Bobby Verwey	
1973	(South Africa) Dale Hayes	278	−10	5 strokes	(South Africa) Dave Wren	
1972: No tournament
1971 (Dec)	(South Africa) Terry Westbrook	275	−13	2 strokes	(England) Peter Oosterhuis	
1971 (Mar)	(England) Peter Oosterhuis	267	−13	3 strokes	(South Africa) John Bland	
1970	(South Africa) Allan Henning	271	−9	2 strokes	(South Africa) Tienie Britz	
