= Spring 1969 PGA Tour Qualifying School graduates =

This is a list of Spring 1969 PGA Tour Qualifying School graduates.

== History ==
The tournament was played at the PGA National Golf Club in Palm Beach Gardens, Florida in April. The tour reduced the length of the tournament from 144 holes to 72 holes for the first time. There were 91 players in the field and 15 earned their tour card. The final three cards were determined in a six-man playoff. Bob Eastwood was the medallist at 291, three strokes ahead of Jerry Preuss.

== List of graduates ==
#	Player	Notes
1	(United States) Bob Eastwood	Winner of 1966 California State Amateur
2	(United States) Jerry Preuss	
T3	(United States) Bobby Greenwood	
T3	(United States) Gary Groh	
T3	(United States) Don Parson	
T3	(United States) Hal Underwood	Winner of 1967 Eastern Amateur
T7	(United States) Jon Cutshall	
T7	(United States) Chuck Montalbano	
T7	(United States) John Schroeder	
T10	(United States) Rod Curl	
T10	(South Africa) Hugh Inggs	Winner of 1969 Rhodesian Masters
T10	(United States) Johnny Miller	Low amateur at 1966 U.S. Open
T13	(United States) Mahlon Moe	
T13	(United States) Mike Nugent	
T13	(United States) Mike Reasor	
