= Rhodesian Dunlop Masters =

Tournament information
- Location: Salisbury, Rhodesia
- Established: 1966
- Course: Royal Salisbury Golf Club
- Par: 72
- Tours: Southern Africa Tour; Rhodesian Circuit
- Format: Stroke play
- Prize fund: Rh$14,000
- Month played: November
- Final year: 1978

Tournament record score
- Aggregate: 268 Bobby Cole (1972)
- To par: −20 as above

Final champion
- (South Africa) Simon Hobday

Location map
- Location in Rhodesia

The Rhodesian Dunlop Masters was a golf tournament that was held in Rhodesia. It was an event on the Southern Africa Tour until the late 1970s.

== History ==
The tournament rotated round three host courses, Royal Salisbury Golf Club and Chapman Golf Club in Salisbury (now Harare), and Bulawayo Golf Club in Bulawayo.

Due to the seasonal nature of the circuit there were two tournaments held in both 1971 and 1976, and no event in 1975, as it was rescheduled between early and late dates in the season.

== Winners ==
Year	Tour (Note: AFR − Southern Africa Tour; RHO − Rhodesian Circuit.)	Winner	Score	To par	Margin of victory	Runner-up	Ref.
1978	AFR	(South Africa) Simon Hobday	272	−16	4 strokes	(Rhodesia) Tony Johnstone (a)	
1977	AFR	(South Africa) Allan Henning (4)	276	−12	Playoff	(South Africa) Bobby Cole	
1976 (Dec)	AFR	(South Africa) Hugh Baiocchi	274	−14	2 strokes	(South Africa) Andries Oosthuizen	
1976 (Feb)	AFR	(South Africa) Allan Henning (3)	279	−9	Playoff	(South Africa) Hugh Baiocchi	
1975: No tournament
1974	AFR	(South Africa) Allan Henning (2)	210 (Note: Shortened to 54 holes due to weather.)	−6	2 strokes	(South Africa) Dale Hayes	
1973	AFR	(South Africa) Dale Hayes	275	−13	2 strokes	(South Africa) Allan Henning	
1972	AFR	(South Africa) Dale Hayes	268	−20	4 strokes	(South Africa) Cobie Legrange	
1971 (Dec)	AFR	(England) Peter Oosterhuis	272	−16	3 strokes	(South Africa) Tienie Britz	
1971 (Mar)	RHO	(South Africa) Denis Hutchinson	277	−11	4 strokes	(Rhodesia) Simon Hobday	
1970	RHO	(South Africa) Hugh Inggs (2)	277	−7	4 strokes	(England) Peter Oosterhuis	
1969	RHO	(South Africa) Hugh Inggs	278	−6	1 stroke	(South Africa) Graham Henning	
1968	RHO	(South Africa) Cobie Legrange	281	−7	1 stroke	(Rhodesia) J. Hayes	
1967	RHO	(South Africa) Graham Henning	276				
1966	RHO	(South Africa) Allan Henning	283				
