= 1975–76 Southern Africa Tour =

Golf tour season

1975–76 Southern Africa Tour season
- Duration: 26 November 1975 – 15 February 1976
- Number of official events: 9 (Note: One further tournament was scheduled but was cancelled.)
- Most wins: (South Africa) Dale Hayes (3) (South Africa) Allan Henning (3)
- Order of Merit: (South Africa) Allan Henning

The 1975–76 Southern Africa Tour was the fifth season of the Southern Africa Tour, the main professional golf tour in South Africa since it was formed in 1971.

== Season outline ==
The season was dominated by Dale Hayes and Allan Henning who won the majority of the events. Hayes started the season well, winning the first two events. However, Henning won the Datsun International and the NCR Western Province Open to close in on the Order of Merit race. Hayes won the flagship event, the BP South African Open, but Henning won the season's final event; the Rhodesian Dunlop Masters, to capture the Order of Merit honors.

The first tournament of the season was the Beck's PGA Championship at Wanderers Golf Club. Hayes shot a 62 (−8) in the third round which placed him in good position in the tournament. He described it as his best round ever. The round broke the course recorded by three shots. Hayes followed it up with a three-under-par 67 to defeat Henning, the solo runner-up, by six shots. Hayes won the following event, the Holiday Inns Open, as well, defeating John Fourie in a playoff.

Henning won the fourth official tournament of the season, the Datsun International, while Hayes finished runner-up. The next week, at the ICL International, Hayes and Henning finished joint runner-up, one behind England's Peter Townsend. Henning then won the next event, the NCR Western Province Open. In late January, Hayes tied John Fourie at the end of regulation play at the BP South African Open. Like earlier in the season, Hayes again defeated Fourie in a playoff. Henning, however, won the final event of the year, the Rhodesian Dunlop Masters. This assured that he secured the Order of Merit by a small margin over Hayes.

== Schedule ==
The following table lists official events during the 1975–76 season.

Date	Tournament	Location	Purse (R)	Winner (Note: The number in brackets after each winner's name is the number of Southern Africa Tour events they had won up to and including that tournament. This information is only shown for Southern Africa Tour members.)	Notes
29 Nov	Beck's PGA Championship	Transvaal	35,000	(South Africa) Dale Hayes (9)	
6 Dec	Holiday Inns Open	Swaziland	20,000	(South Africa) Dale Hayes (10)	
13 Dec	General Motors International Classic	Cape	20,000	(South Africa) Gary Player (9)	
10 Jan	Datsun International	Transvaal	20,000	(South Africa) Allan Henning (3)	
~~17 Jan~~	Natal Open	Natal	–	Cancelled	
17 Jan	ICL International	Transvaal	20,000	(England) Peter Townsend (1)	
24 Jan	NCR Western Province Open	Cape	15,000	(South Africa) Allan Henning (4)	
31 Jan	BP South African Open	Transvaal	20,000	(South Africa) Dale Hayes (11)	
7 Feb	Dunlop South African Masters	Transvaal	18,000	(South Africa) Gary Player (10)	
15 Feb	Rhodesian Dunlop Masters	Rhodesia	15,000	(South Africa) Allan Henning (5)	

=== Unofficial events ===
The following events were sanctioned by the Southern Africa Tour, but did not carry official money, nor were wins official.

Date	Tournament	Location	Purse (R)	Winners	Notes
4 Jan	Datsun International	Transvaal	n/a	Team South Africa	Team event

== Order of Merit ==
The Order of Merit was based on prize money won during the season, calculated in South African rand.

Position	Player	Prize money (R)
1	(South Africa) Allan Henning	18,275
2	(South Africa) Dale Hayes	17,630
3	(South Africa) John Fourie	12,001
4	(South Africa) Cobie Legrange	10,413
5	(South Africa) Hugh Baiocchi	9,880
