= Andries Oosthuizen =

South African professional golfer (born 1954)

Personal information
- Nationality: South Africa
- Born: c. 1954 (age c. 71–72)

Career
- Sport: Golf
- Turned professional: 1973
- Former tour: European Tour

Best results in major championships
- Masters Tournament: DNP
- PGA Championship: DNP
- U.S. Open: DNP
- The Open Championship: T12: 1975

Andries Oosthuizen (born c. 1954) is a South African professional golfer. He played on the European Tour from 1974 to 1977 and finished tied for 12th place in the 1975 Open Championship.

== Amateur career ==
Oosthuizen won the 1973 South African Amateur beating Coen Dreyer, 3 and 2, in the final. Later in the year he finished runner-up to George Harvey at the South African Tour's Qualifying School and he turned professional in November 1973.

== Professional career ==
Oosthuizen played full-time on the European Tour from 1974 to 1977. In one of his early professional tournaments, the 1974 Penfold Tournament he made an albatross and was joint leader after the first round, although he eventually finished well down the field.

In the northern hemisphere winter, Oosthuizen would play on his home South African Tour. He performed excellently at the General Motors Open that November and was tied with Gary Player after the first three rounds. The final round was a "tense duel" between the overnight leaders and Oosthuizen actually outplayed Player, the defending Masters and Open champion, by one shot through 16 holes. However, Player would come through down the stretch with a birdie-birdie finish to win by one. The following month Oosthuizen would record a second runner-up finish in South Africa, this time to compatriot Vin Baker at the ICL International. It was another difficult defeat as Baker recorded a birdie 3 on the first playoff hole to defeat Oosthuizen.

The following season was his best season on the European Tour. He was beaten by Bob Shearer in the final of the 1975 Piccadilly Medal, losing the match at the 19th hole. This would be his best finish ever on the European Tour. Oosthuizen may be best known for his performance in the 1975 Open Championship. He opened with rounds of 69, 69 and 70 and was tied for fifth place after three rounds, starting the final day only four strokes behind fellow South African and leader Bobby Cole. However in the difficult conditions he would score 78 (+6) in the final round and finish tied for 12th place. He finished 1975 a career best 14th on the European Tour's Order of Merit.

In the late 1970s Oosthuizen would come close to winning two events near his homeland of South Africa. In November 1976, Oosthuizen finished runner-up at the Victoria Falls Classic, an event in Rhodesia. He lost a playoff to England's Nick Job. In 1979, Oosthuizen again had another playoff loss in the region. This time it was to John Bland on the 5th extra hole at the Holiday Inns Open, an event in Swaziland.

1977 was his second best season on the European Tour and he finished 27th in the Order of Merit. In the Penfold PGA Championship, he was joint leader after 36 holes with Peter Oosterhuis but a third round 81 dropped him well down the field. Later in the year he also started well in the Carroll's Irish Open and was only one stroke behind the leader after 36 holes, but again faded and finished outside the top-10.

After the 1977 season, Oosthuizen would not play on the European Tour full-time again, although he played part-time between 1978 and 1985.

== Amateur wins ==
- 1973 South African Amateur

== Playoff record ==
Southern Africa Tour playoff record (0–2)

No.	Year	Tournament	Opponent	Result
1	1974	ICL Transvaal Open	(South Africa) Vin Baker	Lost to birdie on first extra hole
2	1979	Holiday Inns Open	(South Africa) John Bland	Lost to par on fifth extra hole

== Results in major championships ==
Tournament	1974	1975	1976	1977
The Open Championship	CUT	T12	T55	CUT

Note: Oosthuizen only played in The Open Championship.
CUT = missed the half-way cut
"T" indicates a tie for a place

== Team appearances ==
- Datsun International (representing South Africa): 1976 (winners)
