= 1980–81 Southern Africa Tour =

Golf tour season

1980–81 Southern Africa Tour season
- Duration: 13 November 1980 – 28 February 1981
- Number of official events: 13
- Most wins: (South Africa) Hugh Baiocchi (3)
- Order of Merit: (Zimbabwe) Mark McNulty

The 1980–81 Southern Africa Tour was the 10th season of the Southern Africa Tour, the main professional golf tour in South Africa since it was formed in 1971.

== Season outline ==
This was a breakout season for a trio of young Zimbabwean golfers, Mark McNulty, Nick Price, and Denis Watson. Early in the season, however, they regularly finished runner-up to veterans like Hugh Baiocchi, Harold Henning, and Bobby Cole. Late in the season, however, they all won tournaments with McNulty capturing Order of Merit honours.

Early in the season it was veterans who dominated, often beating young golfers down the stretch. Veteran Hugh Baiocchi won the inaugural event of the season, the Zimbabwe Open, by one over joint runner-up Watson. Baiocchi also won the subsequent event, the Lexington PGA Championship, by one shot over joint runner-up McNulty. The following week's event, the ICL International, was won by a 46-year-old Harold Henning by a stroke over Watson, again joint runner-up. The next week, at the Datsun South African Open, McNulty was runner-up again, four behind champion Bobby Cole, another veteran.

Late in the year, the trio of young golfers from Zimbabwe started winning tournaments. At the first event after the Christmas interlude, Mark McNulty finally won, earning a victory at the Sigma Series 1, defeating Nick Price, the solo runner-up. The second edition of the series was won by John Bland. Bland won again at the Sigma Series 3 with Price finishing as runner-up. In February, at the Sun City Classic, McNulty looked set to win but a late hole "blunder" gave Lee Trevino the victory. The following week, Price finally won, earning a victory at the SAB South African Masters by four shots over McNulty. At the final event of the year, the Asseng Champion of Champions, Denis Watson claimed his first victory on tour. McNulty finished solo second. McNulty won the Order of Merit with Price coming in third and Watson fifth.

== Schedule ==
The following table lists official events during the 1980–81 season.

Date	Tournament	Location	Purse (R)	Winner (Note: The number in brackets after each winner's name is the number of Southern Africa Tour events they had won up to and including that tournament. This information is only shown for Southern Africa Tour members.)	Notes
16 Nov	Zimbabwe Open	Zimbabwe	30,000	(South Africa) Hugh Baiocchi (8)	
22 Nov	Lexington PGA Championship	Transvaal	100,000	(South Africa) Hugh Baiocchi (9)	
29 Nov	ICL International	Transvaal	45,000	(South Africa) Harold Henning (3)	
6 Dec	Datsun South African Open	Natal	75,000	(South Africa) Bobby Cole (6)	
13 Dec	Kalahari Diamond Classic	Botswana	20,000	(England) Ian Mosey (1)	
10 Jan	Sigma Series 1	Cape	30,000	(Zimbabwe) Mark McNulty (2)	New tournament series
17 Jan	Sigma Series 2	Orange Free State	30,000	(South Africa) John Bland (5)	
24 Jan	Sigma Series 3	Cape	30,000	(South Africa) John Bland (6)	
31 Jan	Vaal Reefs Open	Transvaal	30,000	(South Africa) Hugh Baiocchi (10)	
7 Feb	Sun City Classic	Transvaal	100,000	(United States) Lee Trevino (n/a)	
14 Feb	SAB South African Masters	Cape	100,000	(Zimbabwe) Nick Price (2)	
21 Feb	Holiday Inns Pro-Am	Swaziland	40,000	(England) Ian Mosey (2)	Pro-Am
28 Feb	Asseng Champion of Champions	Transvaal	40,000	(Zimbabwe) Denis Watson (1)	New tournament

== Order of Merit ==
The Order of Merit was based on prize money won during the season, calculated in South African rand.

Position	Player	Prize money (R)
1	(Zimbabwe) Mark McNulty	50,193
2	Hugh Baiocchi	43,402
3	Nick Price	34,436
4	(South Africa) John Bland	25,046
5	(Zimbabwe) Denis Watson	22,704
