= Harold Henning =

South African professional golfer (1934–2004)

Personal information
- Nickname: Horse
- Nationality: South Africa
- Born: 3 October 1934 Johannesburg, South Africa
- Died: 1 January 2004 (aged 69) Miami Beach, Florida, U.S.
- Height: 6 ft 0 in (1.83 m)
- Weight: 165 lb (75 kg; 11.8 st)

Career
- Sport: Golf
- Turned professional: 1953
- Former tours: PGA Tour; European Tour; Champions Tour
- Professional wins: 43

Number of wins by tour
- PGA Tour: 2
- European Tour: 1
- PGA Tour Champions: 3
- Other: 37

Best results in major championships
- Masters Tournament: T11: 1962
- PGA Championship: T44: 1969
- U.S. Open: T37: 1968
- The Open Championship: T3: 1960, 1970

Harold Henning (3 October 1934 – 1 January 2004) was a South African professional golfer. He played on the PGA Tour and the Senior PGA Tour. He won professional tournaments on the highest level in Africa, Australia, Asia, North America and Europe.

== Early life ==
Henning was born in Johannesburg, South Africa in 1934. His brothers Allan, Brian, and Graham all became professional golfers.

== Professional career ==
Nicknamed The Horse, he turned pro in 1953. From 1953 to 1965, Henning traveled the world playing on international circuits, winning the national championships of Switzerland. South Africa, Italy, and Germany. A win with Gary Player at the 1965 Canada Cup convinced him to play on the PGA Tour.

In 1966, Henning won the PGA Tour's Texas Open. However, he was not a PGA Tour member yet and was expected to earn membership at 1966 PGA Tour Qualifying School. However, shortly before the tournament, the PGA Tour gave him an exemption from the event.

In 1970, Henning won the Tallahassee Open Invitational on the PGA Tour. He then retired in 1972.

He returned to the game six years later and recorded a victory at the KLM Dutch Open in 1981. Henning won the title in dramatic fashion, going out on the last hole of the tournament in the last group with Nick Price, both of them on seven under par. Ray Floyd stood in the clubhouse, having finished on seven under par. Henning went in to a greenside bunker with his third shot, while Price was on the green in three. Then Henning holed his bunker shot for a birdie 4 and won the tournament with one-shot-margin.

Upon reaching age 50 in October 1984, Henning began play on the Senior PGA Tour. During his 18 seasons on this Tour, he won three official events and two Liberty Mutual Legends of Golf Championships.

== Personal life ==
Henning died after a long illness in 2004.

== Professional wins (43) ==
=== PGA Tour wins (2) ===
No.	Date	Tournament	Winning score	Margin of victory	Runner(s)-up
1	1 May 1966	Texas Open Invitational	−8 (72-67-65-68=272)	3 strokes	(United States) Wes Ellis, (United States) Gene Littler, (United States) Ken Still
2	26 Apr 1970	Tallahassee Open Invitational	−11 (67-76-64-70=277)	1 stroke	(United States) Rives McBee

PGA Tour playoff record (0–1)

No.	Year	Tournament	Opponent	Result
1	1969	Los Angeles Open	(United States) Charlie Sifford	Lost to birdie on first extra hole

=== European Tour wins (1) ===
No.	Date	Tournament	Winning score	Margin of victory	Runners-up
1	26 Jul 1981	KLM Dutch Open	−8 (71-68-70-71=280)	1 stroke	(United States) Raymond Floyd, (Zimbabwe) Nick Price

=== Other European wins (12) ===
- 1957 Italian Open
- 1958 Daks Tournament (tie with Peter Thomson), Yorkshire Evening News Tournament (tie with Eric Brown)
- 1959 Spalding Tournament (tie with Eric Lester)
- 1960 Swiss Open, Sprite International
- 1964 Swiss Open, Pringle of Scotland Tournament, Lancia d'Oro
- 1965 Swiss Open, German Open
- 1966 Engadine Open

=== Far East Circuit wins (1) ===
No.	Date	Tournament	Winning score	Margin of victory	Runner-up
1	13 Mar 1966	Malayan Open	−10 (70-69-71-68=278)	3 strokes	(Australia) Peter Thomson

=== Southern Africa Tour wins (3) ===
No.	Date	Tournament	Winning score	Margin of victory	Runner(s)-up
1	5 Feb 1972	General Motors International Classic	−16 (65-70-74-71=280)	4 strokes	(South Africa) Gary Player
2	25 Nov 1972	Luyt Lager PGA Championship	−1 (69-68-71-71=279)	1 stroke	(South Africa) Hugh Baiocchi
3	29 Nov 1980	ICL International	−7 (73-67-69-72=281)	1 stroke	(South Africa) John Bland, (England) Ian Mosey, (Zimbabwe) Denis Watson

=== Other South African wins (17) ===
- 1956 Natal Open, Cock of the North (Zambia)
- 1957 South African Open, Transvaal Open, 1.000 Guineas Anglo-African Tournament (Rhodesia)
- 1959 Cock of the North (Zambia), Western Province Open
- 1960 Northern Transvaal Open
- 1961 Natal Open
- 1962 South African Open
- 1965 South African PGA Championship
- 1966 South African PGA Championship, Kimberley Tournament (South Africa) (tie with Tony Jacklin), General Motors Open
- 1967 South African PGA Championship
- 1972 International Better-ball (with Graham Henning), Ellerines Team Tournament (with Graham Henning)

=== Other wins (2) ===
No.	Date	Tournament	Winning score	Margin of victory	Runners-up
1	4 Oct 1958	Wiseman's Tournament	−10 (278)	5 strokes	(Australia) Peter Thomson (South Africa) Gary Player
2	3 Oct 1965	Canada Cup (with (South Africa) Gary Player)	−5 (142-138-139-152=571)	8 strokes	Spain − Ángel Miguel and Ramón Sota

=== Senior PGA Tour wins (3) ===
No.	Date	Tournament	Winning score	Margin of victory	Runner(s)-up
1	27 Oct 1985	Seiko-Tucson Senior Match Play Championship	4 & 3		(United States) Dan Sikes
2	13 Mar 1988	GTE Classic	−2 (68-73-73=214)	3 strokes	(Australia) Bruce Crampton, (United States) Dale Douglass
3	8 Sep 1991	First of America Classic	−11 (72-64-66=202)	Playoff	(United States) Gibby Gilbert

Senior PGA Tour playoff record (1–2)

No.	Year	Tournament	Opponent(s)	Result
1	1988	Silver Pages Classic	(South Africa) Gary Player	Lost to birdie on first extra hole
2	1989	GTE Suncoast Classic	(New Zealand) Bob Charles, (United States) Dave Hill, (United States) Jim Ferree	Charles won with birdie on third extra hole Ferree and Hill eliminated by birdie on first hole
3	1991	First of America Classic	(United States) Gibby Gilbert	Won with birdie on first extra hole

=== Other senior wins (2) ===
- 1989 Liberty Mutual Legends of Golf (with Al Geiberger)
- 1993 Liberty Mutual Legends of Golf

== Results in major championships ==
Tournament	1957	1958	1959
Masters Tournament			
U.S. Open			
The Open Championship	29	13	T23
PGA Championship			

Tournament	1960	1961	1962	1963	1964	1965	1966	1967	1968	1969
Masters Tournament	CUT		T11		CUT	CUT	T22	T36	T22	T13
U.S. Open								CUT	T37	
The Open Championship	T3	T10	T30	T20	T8		T13	T6		T16
PGA Championship									T45	T44

Tournament	1970	1971	1972	1973	1974	1975	1976	1977	1978	1979
Masters Tournament	CUT	41								
U.S. Open										
The Open Championship	T3			T10						
PGA Championship										

Tournament	1980	1981	1982	1983	1984
Masters Tournament					
U.S. Open					
The Open Championship	T51	CUT	41	T6	CUT
PGA Championship					

Top 10
Did not play

CUT = missed the half-way cut (3rd round cut in 1984 Open Championship)
"T" indicates a tie for a place

=== Summary ===
Tournament	Wins	2nd	3rd	Top-5	Top-10	Top-25	Events	Cuts made
Masters Tournament	0	0	0	0	0	4	10	6
U.S. Open	0	0	0	0	0	0	2	1
The Open Championship	0	0	2	2	6	12	18	16
PGA Championship	0	0	0	0	0	0	2	2
Totals	0	0	2	2	6	16	32	19

- Most consecutive cuts made – 7 (1967 Open Championship – 1969 PGA)
- Longest streak of top-10s – 1 (six times)

== Team appearances ==
this list may be incomplete

- World Cup (representing South Africa): 1957, 1958, 1959, 1961, 1965 (winners), 1966, 1967, 1970, 1971
