= 1978–79 Southern Africa Tour =

Golf tour season

1978–79 Southern Africa Tour season
- Duration: 1 November 1978 – 7 February 1979
- Number of official events: 8
- Most wins: (South Africa) Dale Hayes (2) (South Africa) Simon Hobday (2)
- Order of Merit: (South Africa) Hugh Baiocchi

The 1978–79 Southern Africa Tour was the eighth season of the Southern Africa Tour, the main professional golf tour in South Africa since it was formed in 1971.

== Season outline ==
Simon Hobday was the top player early in the season. At the inaugural event, the Rhodesian Dunlop Masters, he was victorious. The following event, the Victoria Falls Classic, also held in Rhodesia, was being played in the middle of the Rhodesian Bush War. Hobday tried to recruit a number of top European players to play in the event but was not successful. He went on the win the event.

South Africans Dale Hayes, Hugh Baiocchi, and Tienie Britz were the top players later in the season. In the third event, the ICL International, Hayes defeated Baiocchi in a playoff. At the fifth tournament, Baiocchi won the Yellow Pages South African Open by one shot. The following week Hayes defeated Britz in a playoff at the Kronenbrau Masters. Britz won the Kalahari Classic the week after, however. Baiocchi went on to win the Order of Merit.

== Schedule ==
The following table lists official events during the 1978–79 season.

Date	Tournament	Location	Purse (R)	Winner (Note: The number in brackets after each winner's name is the number of Southern Africa Tour events they had won up to and including that tournament. This information is only shown for Southern Africa Tour members.)	Notes
4 Nov	Rhodesian Dunlop Masters	Rhodesia	Rh$14,000	(South Africa) Simon Hobday (1)	
11 Nov	Victoria Falls Classic	Rhodesia	35,000	(South Africa) Simon Hobday (2)	
18 Nov	ICL International	Transvaal	35,000	(South Africa) Dale Hayes (13)	
2 Dec	Lexington PGA Championship	Transvaal	50,000	(United States) Hale Irwin (n/a)	
9 Dec	Yellow Pages South African Open	Cape	45,000	(South Africa) Hugh Baiocchi (7)	
15 Dec	Kronenbrau Masters	Cape	30,000	(South Africa) Dale Hayes (14)	
14 Jan	Kalahari Classic	Botswana	18,000	(South Africa) Tienie Britz (3)	New tournament
7 Feb	Holiday Inns Open	Swaziland	20,000	(South Africa) John Bland (4)	

== Order of Merit ==
The Order of Merit was based on prize money won during the season, calculated in South African rand.

Position	Player	Prize money (R)
1	(South Africa) Hugh Baiocchi	19,804
