= General Motors Open =

General Motors International Classic
Tournament information
- Location: Port Elizabeth, South Africa
- Established: 1966
- Course: Wedgewood Park Country Club
- Par: 74
- Tour: Southern Africa Tour
- Format: Stroke play
- Prize fund: R 20,000
- Month played: December
- Final year: 1975

Tournament record score
- Aggregate: 276 Gary Player (1971)
- To par: −20 as above

Final champion
- (South Africa) Gary Player

Location map
- Location in South Africa Location in Eastern Cape

The General Motors Open was a golf tournament on the Southern Africa Tour from 1966 to 1975. The event was held at Wedgewood Golf Club in Port Elizabeth, South Africa. Gary Player won the event four times. It was also the site of Peter Oosterhuis' first professional victory.

== Winners ==
Year	Winner	Score	To par	Margin of victory	Runner(s)-up	Ref.
General Motors International Classic
1975	(South Africa) Gary Player (4)	285	−11	3 strokes	(South Africa) John Fourie	
1974 (Nov)	(South Africa) Gary Player (3)	280	−16	1 stroke	(South Africa) Andries Oosthuizen	
1974 (Feb)	(South Africa) Gary Player (2)	283	−13	5 strokes	(South Africa) Hugh Baiocchi (South Africa) John Fourie	
1973	(South Africa) Hugh Baiocchi	282	−14	Playoff	(South Africa) Dale Hayes	
1972	(South Africa) Harold Henning (2)	280	−16	4 strokes	(South Africa) Gary Player	
General Motors Open
1971	(South Africa) Gary Player	276	−20	9 strokes	(England) John Garner (England) Peter Oosterhuis	
1970	(England) Peter Oosterhuis	285	−11	2 strokes	(South Africa) Gary Player	
1969	(South Africa) Graham Henning	279	−17	2 strokes	(South Africa) Hugh Inggs	
1968	(South Africa) Cobie Legrange (2)					
1967	(South Africa) Cobie Legrange					
1966	(South Africa) Harold Henning					
