= Engadine Open =

Golf tournament

Tournament information
- Location: St. Moritz, Switzerland
- Established: 1962
- Course(s): Engadine Golf Club
- Par: 70
- Format: Stroke play
- Month played: August
- Final year: 1970

Tournament record score
- Aggregate: 265 Graham Henning (1967)

Final champion
- (South Africa) Cobie Legrange

The Engadine Open was a golf tournament in Switzerland from 1962 to the late 1960s. The event was played at Engadine Golf Club near St. Moritz, Switzerland. As of the last tournament, it was a par 70 measuring 6,545 yards.

== Winners ==
Year	Winner	Score	Margin of victory	Runner(s)-up	Ref
1962	(New Zealand) Bob Charles	271	1 stroke	(South Africa) Bobby Verwey	
1963	(England) Neil Coles	276	2 strokes	(Scotland) Stewart Davies (United Arab Republic) Abdel Halim Kahoul	
1964	(South Africa) Cobie Legrange	276	1 stroke	(United Arab Republic) Cherif El-Sayed Cherif	
1965	(Italy) Carlo Grappasonni	273			
1966	(South Africa) Harold Henning	274	4 strokes	(South Africa) Allan Henning (Netherlands) Martin Roesink (Belgium) Donald Swaelens	
1967	(South Africa) Graham Henning	265	10 strokes	(Australia) Randall Vines	
1968	(Australia) Randall Vines	269	2 strokes	(Italy) Luciano Bernardini	
1969	(South Africa) Cobie Legrange	268	5 strokes	(Italy) Roberto Bernardini	
1970	(South Africa) Cobie Legrange	204	1 stroke	(South Africa) Barry Franklin	
