= Bobby Cole (golfer) =

South African professional golfer (born 1948)

Personal information
- Full name: Robert Eric Cole
- Nationality: South Africa
- Born: 11 May 1948 (age 78) Springs, South Africa
- Height: 5 ft 10 in (1.78 m)
- Weight: 170 lb (77 kg; 12 st)
- Spouse: Linda Parker
- Children: 7, including Eric

Career
- Sport: Golf
- Turned professional: 1967
- Former tours: PGA Tour; Southern Africa Tour; Champions Tour
- Professional wins: 14

Number of wins by tour
- PGA Tour: 1
- Sunshine Tour: 7
- Other: 6

Best results in major championships
- Masters Tournament: T15: 1975
- PGA Championship: T3: 1974
- U.S. Open: T13: 1971
- The Open Championship: T3: 1975

Achievements and awards
- Southern Africa Tour Order of Merit winner: 1973–74

Robert Eric Cole (born 11 May 1948) is a South African professional golfer.

== Early life ==
Cole was born in Springs, South Africa. After suffering a bicycle accident related knee injury, Cole took up golf at the age of eleven. He grew up playing golf on the course maintained for employees of the gold mine where his father, James Cole, worked. As a child, he was influenced by the careers of Bobby Locke and Gary Player.

He won both the South Africa junior golf championship and the Vaal Amateur.

== Amateur career ==
In 1966, Cole won the British Amateur at Carnoustie, Scotland, at age 18, the youngest winner to that stage. Cole held the record as youngest-ever winner of the tournament until Matteo Manassero won the event in 2009, at age 16. Cole also held the record as the youngest player to play in and make the cut at the Masters Tournament, in 1967, at just short of 19 of age, until Manassero, in 2010, again beat his record.

== Professional career ==
In the fall of 1967, Cole tried out for the PGA Tour at 1967 PGA Tour Qualifying School. He earned medalist honors. In 1974, he claimed both the team and the individual wins in the World Cup. Cole is a two-time winner of the South African Open in 1974 and 1980. In 1986, he won the South African PGA Championship.

On the PGA Tour, Cole won the 1977 Buick Open. He has had nine top-25 finishes in the major championships including a tie for third in the 1975 Open Championship, one stroke out of a playoff. During the event, Cole shot back-to-back rounds of 66, setting and then matching the course record at Carnoustie.

Cole played on the Champions Tour from 1998 to 2001.

== Personal life ==
Cole is married to author Linda Parker. He resides in Windermere, Florida where he teaches private lessons, corporate retreats, and plays ProAms and other golf events.

On 12 December 1980, Cole married American professional golfer Laura Baugh in Cape Town, South Africa. The couple divorced, remarried, and then divorced again. They had seven children together, including professional golfer Eric Cole, who was awarded 2022–23 PGA Tour Rookie of the Year.

== Awards and honors ==
- During the 1973–74 season, Cole earned the Order of Merit for the Southern Africa Tour
- In 2012, Cole was inducted into the Southern Africa Golf Hall of Fame

== Amateur wins ==
- 1964 South African Boys Championship
- 1966 British Amateur, Golf Illustrated Gold Vase (tie with Peter Townsend)

== Professional wins (14) ==
=== PGA Tour wins (1) ===
No.	Date	Tournament	Winning score	Margin of victory	Runner-up
1	4 Sep 1977	Buick Open	−17 (67-69-68-67=271)	1 stroke	(United States) Fred Marti

=== Southern Africa Tour wins (7) ===
No.	Date	Tournament	Winning score	Margin of victory	Runner(s)-up
1	8 Jan 1972	ICL Transvaal Open	−14 (65-67-68-70=270)	Playoff	(South Africa) Tienie Britz
2	9 Dec 1972	Natal Open	−11 (71-68-72-66=277)	1 stroke	(South Africa) Dale Hayes
3	17 Dec 1972	Rhodesian Dunlop Masters	−20 (66-68-63-71=268)	4 strokes	(South Africa) Cobie Legrange
4	20 Jan 1974	Vavasseur Natal Open (2)	−4 (74-72-69-69=284)	1 stroke	(South Africa) Tienie Britz
5	2 Feb 1974	South African Open	−16 (70-65-73-64=272)	4 strokes	(South Africa) Allan Henning
6	6 Dec 1980	Datsun South African Open (2)	−9 (73-63-70-73=279)	4 strokes	(Zimbabwe) Nick Price
7	26 Jan 1986	Lexington PGA Championship	−15 (66-65-66-68=265)	5 strokes	(South Africa) David Frost, (Zimbabwe) Teddy Webber

Southern Africa Tour playoff record (1–2)

No.	Year	Tournament	Opponent	Result
1	1972	ICL Transvaal Open	(South Africa) Tienie Britz	Won with birdie on first extra hole
2	1974	Dunlop South African Masters	(South Africa) Gary Player	Lost to par on second extra hole
3	1977	Rhodesian Dunlop Masters	(South Africa) Allan Henning	

=== Tournament Player Series wins (1) ===
No.	Date	Tournament	Winning score	Margin of victory	Runner-up
1	4 Aug 1985	Seattle-Everett Open	−12 (70-65-66=201)	1 stroke	(United States) Dave Stockton

=== Other South African wins (3) ===
- 1969 Natal Open, Dunlop South African Masters
- 1970 Natal Open

=== Other wins (2) ===
No.	Date	Tournament	Winning score	Margin of victory	Runner(s)-up
1	24 Nov 1974	World Cup (with (South Africa) Dale Hayes)	−6 (137-138-139-140=554)	5 strokes	Japan − Isao Aoki and Masashi Ozaki
2	24 Nov 1974	World Cup Individual Trophy	−9 (66-70-67-68=271)	5 strokes	(Japan) Masashi Ozaki

== Results in major championships ==
Tournament	1966	1967	1968	1969
Masters Tournament		T44		
U.S. Open			CUT	T31
The Open Championship	T30	CUT	T13	CUT
PGA Championship				T21

Tournament	1970	1971	1972	1973	1974	1975	1976	1977	1978	1979
Masters Tournament			CUT			T15	47		28	
U.S. Open	T12	T13	T47		CUT					
The Open Championship	T28				T7	T3	T32	T15		
PGA Championship					T3	T40			T54	

Tournament	1980	1981	1982	1983	1984	1985	1986	1987
Masters Tournament								
U.S. Open				CUT				
The Open Championship								
PGA Championship								T43

Top 10
Did not play

CUT = missed the half-way cut
"T" indicates a tie for a place

=== Summary ===
Tournament	Wins	2nd	3rd	Top-5	Top-10	Top-25	Events	Cuts made
Masters Tournament	0	0	0	0	0	1	5	4
U.S. Open	0	0	0	0	0	2	7	4
The Open Championship	0	0	1	1	2	4	9	7
PGA Championship	0	0	1	1	1	2	5	5
Totals	0	0	2	2	3	9	26	20

- Most consecutive cuts made – 10 (1974 Open Championship – 1978 PGA)
- Longest streak of top-10s – 2 (1974 Open Championship – 1974 PGA)

== Team appearances ==
Amateur

- Eisenhower Trophy (representing South Africa): 1966

Professional

- World Cup (representing South Africa): 1969, 1974 (winners, individual winner), 1976

== See also ==
- 1967 PGA Tour Qualifying School graduates
