= Victoria Falls Classic =

The Victoria Falls Classic was a Rhodesian golf tournament held from 1976 to 1979. Starting in 1977 it was on the Southern African Tour.

== History ==
The event was played at Elephant Hills Country Club at Victoria Falls, Rhodesia. The course was a par-73 measuring 7,868 yards. It was the longest course in Africa.

The inaugural event was sponsored by Meikles. Englishman Nick Job beat South African Andries Oosthuizen in a sudden-death playoff after they had tied on 293. The following year, days after the event, the Elephant Hills Country Club was destroyed by fire, after being hit by a missile during the Rhodesian Bush War. In 1978, the war was still going on but the tournament continued to be played.

== Winners ==
- 1976 (England) Nick Job
- 1977 (South Africa) John Bland
- 1978 (South Africa) Simon Hobday
- 1979 (South Africa) Phil Simmons
