= Dale Hayes =

South African professional golfer

Personal information
- Nationality: South Africa
- Born: 1 July 1952 (age 74) Pretoria, Union of South Africa
- Height: 6 ft 3 in (1.91 m)
- Weight: 276 lb (125 kg; 19.7 st)

Career
- Sport: Golf
- Turned professional: 1970
- Former tours: PGA Tour; European Tour; Southern Africa Tour
- Professional wins: 23

Number of wins by tour
- European Tour: 4
- Sunshine Tour: 14
- Other: 5

Best results in major championships
- Masters Tournament: T19: 1976
- PGA Championship: DNP
- U.S. Open: DNP
- The Open Championship: T11: 1978

Achievements and awards
- Southern Africa Tour Order of Merit winner: 1972–73
- European Tour Order of Merit winner: 1975

Dale Hayes (born 1 July 1952) is a South African professional golfer.

== Amateur career ==
In 1969, Hayes won the 15–17 Boys category at the Junior World Golf Championships.

In 1970, during his last year as an amateur, Hayes won the South African Amateur Stroke Play Championship as well as the Scottish Amateur Stroke Play Championship, still 17 years old.

== Professional career ==
In 1970, Hayes turned professional. On December 6, 1971, Hayes won the Bert Hagerman Invitational on his 19th birthday, his first win on tour. Overall, Hayes won more than a dozen events in South Africa, leading the Southern African Tour's Order of Merit in 1972/73. He also finished as runner-up on the Order of Merit in 1974, 1975, 1976 and 1979. In 1974, he won the World Cup of Golf for South Africa in partnership with Bobby Cole.

In 1971, Hayes won the Spanish Open at the age of 18 years. In 1973, he was fourth on the European Tour Order of Merit, improving to second in 1974 and first in 1975. He played on the PGA Tour in 1976 and 1977, with a best finish of tied for second at the 1977 Florida Citrus Open. He also finished in the top four on the European Tour's Order of Merit in 1978 and 1979, but played little professional golf after his late twenties.

Since he stopped playing tour golf, Hayes has remained involved in the sport in a variety of ways. He has worked as a broadcaster in South Africa and for the Golf Channel, started and edited a golf magazine and helped to found an internet golf shopping business. He is involved in golf course design through a company called Matkovich & Hayes, although he deals only with marketing and public relations, while the actual design is handled by his business partner Peter Matkovic, a professional golfer. Hayes also works as a public speaker and gives golf clinics.

== Awards and honors ==
- In 1972-73, Hayes won the Southern Africa Tour Order of Merit.
- In 1975, Hayes was the European Tour Order of Merit winner.

== Amateur wins ==
- 1969 World Junior Championship (Boys 15–17), South African Amateur Stroke Play Championship, German Amateur Championship, Brazilian Amateur Championship
- 1970 South African Amateur Stroke Play Championship, Scottish Amateur Stroke Play Championship

== Professional wins (23) ==
=== European Tour wins (4) ===
No.	Date	Tournament	Winning score	Margin of victory	Runner(s)-up
1	20 Jul 1975	Swiss Open	−7 (68-69-66-70=273)	1 stroke	(South Africa) Tienie Britz, (Scotland) Bernard Gallacher, (South Africa) Gary Player
2	7 May 1978	Italian Open	+5 (74-72-68-79=293)	3 strokes	(South Africa) Vin Baker, (England) Tommy Horton
3	15 May 1978	French Open	−19 (66-69-67-67=269)	11 strokes	(Spain) Seve Ballesteros
4	22 Apr 1979	Spanish Open	−10 (70-75-67-66=278)	2 strokes	(Scotland) Brian Barnes

European Tour playoff record (0–1)

No.	Year	Tournament	Opponent	Result
1	1979	Italian Open	(Scotland) Brian Barnes	Lost to birdie on fourth extra hole

=== Southern Africa Tour wins (14) ===
No.	Date	Tournament	Winning score	Margin of victory	Runner-up
1	4 Dec 1971	Bert Hagerman Invitational	−22 (66-66-66-68=266)	5 strokes	(South Africa) Hugh Baiocchi
2	7 Jan 1973	Holiday Inns Open	−8 (69-67=136)	1 stroke	(South Africa) Trevor Wilkes
3	17 Feb 1973	Corlett Drive Classic	−14 (68-72-69-65=274)	2 strokes	(South Africa) Comrie du Toit
4	24 Feb 1973	Schoeman Park Open	−10 (72-71-66-69=278)	5 strokes	(South Africa) Dave Wren
5	9 Dec 1973	Rhodesian Dunlop Masters	−13 (69-68-68-70=275)	2 strokes	(South Africa) Allan Henning
6	15 Dec 1973	Rolux Open	−21 (64-67-68-68=267)	7 strokes	(South Africa) Harold Henning
7	23 Feb 1974	Holiday Inns Open	−19 (64-68-67-70=269)	2 strokes	(New Zealand) Bob Charles
8	16 Nov 1974	Beck's PGA Championship	−9 (68-65-69-69=271)	1 stroke	(South Africa) Gary Player
9	29 Nov 1975	Beck's PGA Championship (2)	−14 (66-71-62-67=266)	6 strokes	(South Africa) Allan Henning
10	6 Dec 1975	Holiday Inns Open (2)	−13 (69-75-66-65=275)	Playoff	(South Africa) John Fourie
11	31 Jan 1976	BP South African Open	−1 (75-69-71-72=287)	Playoff	(South Africa) John Fourie
12	20 Nov 1976	Sportsman Lager PGA Championship (3)	−14 (68-66-66-66=266)	1 stroke	(South Africa) Gary Player
13	18 Nov 1978	ICL International	−15 (65-65-66-69=265)	Playoff	(South Africa) Hugh Baiocchi
14	15 Dec 1978	Kronenbrau Masters	−13 (67-72-66-70=275)	Playoff	(South Africa) Tienie Britz

Southern Africa Tour playoff record (4–2)

No.	Year	Tournament	Opponent	Result
1	1973	General Motors International Classic	(South Africa) Hugh Baiocchi	Lost to par on second extra hole
2	1975	Holiday Inns Open	(South Africa) John Fourie	Won with par on fourth extra hole
3	1976	BP South African Open	(South Africa) John Fourie	Won 18-hole playoff; Hayes: −3 (69), Fourie: E (72)
4	1976	Holiday Inns Invitational	(South Africa) Hugh Baiocchi	Lost to par on fourth extra hole
5	1978	ICL International	(South Africa) Hugh Baiocchi	Won with par on third extra hole
6	1978	Kronenbrau Masters	(South Africa) Tienie Britz	Won with birdie on third extra hole

=== Other wins (5) ===
This list is incomplete.

- 1971 Spanish Open
- 1974 Coca-Cola Young Professionals' Championship, World Cup (with Bobby Cole)
- 1975 T.P.D. Young Professionals' Championship
- 1980 Columbian Open

== Results in major championships ==
Tournament	1969	1970	1971	1972	1973	1974	1975	1976	1977	1978	1979	1980	1981
Masters Tournament							CUT	T19	CUT				
The Open Championship	CUT		17	CUT	T39	CUT	T32	T48		T11	CUT	T38	CUT

Did not play

CUT = missed the half-way cut (3rd round cut in 1972 Open Championship)
"T" = tied
Note: Hayes never played in the U.S. Open or the PGA Championship.

== Team appearances ==
Amateur

- Eisenhower Trophy (representing South Africa): 1970

Professional

- World Cup (representing South Africa): 1974 (winners), 1976
- Datsun International (representing South Africa): 1976 (winners)

== See also ==
- Fall 1975 PGA Tour Qualifying School graduates
