= Cobie Legrange =

South African professional golfer (born 1942)

Personal information
- Full name: Cobie Legrange
- Nationality: South Africa
- Born: 1942 (age 83–84) Boksburg, South Africa

Career
- Sport: Golf
- Former tours: European Tour; Southern African Tour
- Professional wins: 20

Number of wins by tour
- Sunshine Tour: 1
- Other: 19

Best results in major championships
- Masters Tournament: CUT: 1965, 1966
- PGA Championship: DNP
- U.S. Open: CUT: 1967
- The Open Championship: T11: 1969

Cobie Legrange (born 1942) is a South African professional golfer. He was one of the best South African golfers of the 1960s and reached a peak ranking of #15 in the world.

== Early life ==
Legrange was born in Boksburg, South Africa.

== Professional career ==
In 1962, Legrange played on the British circuit but performed poorly. In April 1963, he returned to South Africa to improve his play. He maintained a very diligent practice schedule, practicing 8 hours a day, 5 days a week for the remainder of the year.

The results immediately paid off. In the summer of 1964 he finished second in the French Open to Argentine legend Roberto De Vicenzo, taking him to a playoff. On 28 June 1964 he won the Dunlop Masters at Royal Birkdale Golf Club by one stroke. He built a 4-shot lead on the front nine but nearly lost it all. However two strong pars on the last two holes assured a one shot win. He was the only player to match par (288) on the esteemed course. One week later, on 4 July, he won the qualifier for the 1964 Open Championship earning him entry to his first major championship. He also won a number of events on the Australian circuit that fall. On 21 September 1964, he won the Lake Karrinyup Bowl by one stroke over Australian veteran Kel Nagle. On 26 October 1964, he won the Wills Masters in dramatic fashion over American star Jack Nicklaus and Australian Bruce Devlin. Legrange built an eight shot lead on the front nine but after a three-putt on the 16th he had nearly lost it all to playing partner Nicklaus. He dramatically birdied the last two holes, however, to shoot an even par 73 win by three. He earned 4,000 pounds in the victory. Finally, on 8 December 1964, at the Wattie's Tournament in New Zealand, he tied Bill Dunk for a third and final victory down under. He was two behind on the 71st hole but eagled it and then went up and down for par at the last. This extraordinary play earned him a special foreign invitation to the 1965 Masters Tournament.

His 1965 season did not meet the same heights but was still quite good. At the Pringle of Scotland Tournament in June, after an opening round 66 (-6), he led wire-to-wire to defeat two players by three shots. He also finished runner-up at the French Open again, losing to Spanish professional Ramón Sota by a stroke. Once again he earned a special foreign invitation to the Masters.

The following year he finally won in his homeland at the 1966 Western Province Open. He was also runner-up at the South African Open that year. He would become a mainstay on the South African circuit, ultimately winning several times over the next decade.

1969 was one of his final great years on the international circuit. Early in the calendar year he won the Western Province Open for the second and final time. In July, at the 1969 Open Championship, he recovered from a disastrous 79 in the opening round to finish T-11, actually outscoring the rest of the field over the last three rounds. This would be his best showing in a major championship. Later in the summer he would finish runner-up at the German Open to Frenchman Jean Garaïalde and to Englishman Peter Butler at the R.T.V. International Trophy. He would record his final victory in Europe in September, winning the Dunlop Masters for the second time. Like his first Dunlop Masters win he built a big lead, but this time easily held on to it despite bogeying two of the last three holes.

Legrange's final good years were in the early 1970s. At the 1971 South African PGA Championship, one of South Africa's elite Triple Crown events, he finished runner-up, one shot back to compatriot Tienie Britz. Two weeks later he won the Holiday Inns Royal Swazi Sun Open, an official event on the South African Tour held in Mbabane, Swaziland. Legrange tied compatriot Denis Hutchinson after regulation play with a 273 total and then defeated Hutchinson on the second playoff hole. The next year he nearly defended his title in Swaziland, coming up a shot short of American pro John Buczek. He would also finish runner-up at the Western Province Open, at event he won twice, in 1972 and 1974. Legrange's final win was at the 1974 Schoeman Park Open.

Legrange was known for being an extremely deliberate player with an unusual swing process. According to a Scottish golf writer his process was to "fall back on the right foot, drag the club some two feet along the ground, and stop, then restart." By the mid-1970s, however, this method had become far too deliberate and Legrange suffered a severe loss of confidence in his backswing. He would often refuse to complete a shot, stepping away from the ball even after taking the clubhead away from the ball. Naturally, his form tailed off and he would not win again.

After he retired as a touring professional he worked as a club professional at Randpark Golf Club near Johannesburg. In addition he worked as a television commentator, golf course designer, and golf coach.

== Professional wins (20) ==
=== Southern Africa Tour wins (1) ===
No.	Date	Tournament	Winning score	Margin of victory	Runners-up
1	15 Feb 1974	Schoeman Park Open	−7 (66-67-76-72=281)	2 strokes	(South Africa) Dale Hayes, (South Africa) Bobby Verwey

=== New Zealand Golf Circuit wins (1) ===
No.	Date	Tournament	Winning score	Margin of victory	Runner-up
1	8 Dec 1964	Wattie's Tournament	−6 (69-68-70-67=274)	Shared title with (Australia) Bill Dunk	

=== Other South African wins (7) ===
- 1966 Western Province Open
- 1967 Natal Open, General Motors Open
- 1968 Transvaal Open, General Motors Open
- 1969 Western Province Open
- 1971 Holiday Inns Royal Swazi Sun Open

=== British PGA circuit wins (4) ===
- 1964 Dunlop Masters
- 1965 Pringle of Scotland Tournament
- 1966 Senior Service Tournament
- 1969 Dunlop Masters

=== Rhodesian circuit wins (2) ===
- 1968 Rhodesian Dunlop Masters, Bata Bush Babes Tournament

=== Other wins (5) ===
note: this list may be incomplete

- 1964 Engadine Open, Wills Masters, Lake Karrinyup Bowl
- 1969 Engadine Open
- 1970 Engadine Open

== Results in major championships ==
Tournament	1964	1965	1966	1967	1968	1969
Masters Tournament		CUT	CUT			
U.S. Open				CUT		
The Open Championship	CUT	T17	CUT			T11

Note: Legrange never played in the PGA Championship.

Did not play

CUT = missed the half-way cut
"T" = tied

== Team appearances ==
- World Cup (representing South Africa): 1968
- Datsun International (representing South Africa): 1976 (winners)
