= Graham Henning =

South African golfer

Graham Henning was a South African professional golfer. In the late 1960s and early 70s Henning was briefly one of the top golfers in South Africa. He recorded several 1st and 2nd place finishes in top international events across Europe and Africa. This excellent play helped him qualify for South Africa's 1969 World Cup team.

== Early life ==
Henning was born into a golfing family. His brothers Allan, Brian, and Harold all became professional golfers.

== Professional career ==
Henning's first top performance on the international stage was at the 1967 Engadine Open. After opening with an even par 70 Henning fired consecutive rounds of 67 and 66 to get into contention. As the final round started he was at −7, one back of Australia's Randall Vines. Henning fired an astonishing final round 62 to outplay Vines by 11 and win by 10 strokes.

Two years later, in 1969, he would play excellently on the international circuit. In February, he won the 1969 General Motors Open at the Wedgewood Golf Course in Port Elizabeth, South Africa. He defeated compatriot Hugh Inggs by two shots. A month later he nearly won again on the South African circuit. He held the 36-hole lead at the Rhodesian Masters before shooting a "disastrous" third round 75 (+4) and ultimately finishing one behind, this time losing to Inggs. In June, he tied England's Alex Caygill at the Martini International on the European circuit. Henning had a chance to win outright but hit his drive in the woods on the last hole and would make bogey. In August, he finished runner-up to Italy's Roberto Bernardini at Munich's Agfa-Gevaert Tournament, one stroke behind.

His final high finishes were in the early 1970s. In 1971 he would finish a distant runner-up to England's Peter Oosterhuis at the Transvaal Open. The following year he would win two team events with brother Harold.

After his touring career was over Henning was the club professional at Wanderers for many years.

== Personal life ==
His son Nic Henning is a professional golfer.

== Professional wins (7) ==
=== Southern African circuit wins (5) ===
- 1967 Bata Bush Babes Tournament, Rhodesian Dunlop Masters
- 1969 General Motors Open
- 1972 International Better-Ball (with Harold Henning), Ellerines Team Tournament (with Harold Henning)

=== European circuit wins (2) ===
- 1967 Engadine Open
- 1969 Martini International (tied with Alex Caygill)

== Team appearances ==
Professional

- World Cup (representing South Africa): 1969
