= Hugh Baiocchi =

South African professional golfer

Personal information
- Full name: Hugh John Baiocchi
- Nationality: South Africa
- Born: 17 August 1946 (age 80) Johannesburg, South Africa
- Height: 6 ft 0 in (1.83 m)
- Weight: 170 lb (77 kg; 12 st)
- Spouse: Patricia Joan (m. 1971)
- Children: 2

Career
- Sport: Golf
- College: University of Witwaterstrand
- Turned professional: 1971
- Former tours: European Tour; Southern Africa Tour; Champions Tour
- Professional wins: 24
- Highest ranking: 54 (14 June 1987)

Number of wins by tour
- European Tour: 6
- Sunshine Tour: 11
- PGA Tour Champions: 3
- Other: 4

Best results in major championships
- Masters Tournament: T22: 1975
- PGA Championship: DNP
- U.S. Open: WD: 1979
- The Open Championship: T9: 1984

Achievements and awards
- Southern Africa Tour Order of Merit winner: 1978–79

Hugh John Baiocchi (born 17 August 1946) is a South African professional golfer who has won more than 20 professional tournaments around the world.

== Early life ==
Baiocchi was born in Johannesburg.

== Professional career ==
In 1971, Baiocchi turned professional and spent his regular career playing mainly in Europe. He was a member of the European Tour from its first season in 1972 until 1993 and made the top one hundred on the Order of Merit for the Tour's first nineteen seasons, including three top ten placings: 1973 (3rd); 1975 (6th) and 1977 (2nd). He won six official money events on the tour. He also competed regularly on the Southern Africa Tour during the Northern Hemisphere winter, winning several tournaments there and winning the Order of Merit in 1978/79.

As a senior (over 50) golfer, Baiocchi played mainly on the U.S.-based Champions Tour, where he has three wins.

He also designed many golf courses such as the Legend Course at the Constance Belle Mare Plage Resort in Mauritius, venue of the 2011 MCB Tour Championship.

== Personal life ==
Baiocchi is married to Joan. He has two children. He currently lives in Tequesta, Florida. His daughter, Lauren, was married to well-known retired baseball player Johnny Bench.

== Amateur wins ==
- 1968 Brazil Amateur Open Championship
- 1970 South African Amateur

== Professional wins (24) ==
=== European Tour wins (6) ===
No.	Date	Tournament	Winning score	Margin of victory	Runner(s)-up
1	29 Jul 1973	Swiss Open	−2 (68-70-69-71=278)	1 stroke	(Australia) Jack Newton, (Northern Ireland) Eddie Polland
2	10 Aug 1975	Dutch Open	−9 (71-72-69-67=279)	2 strokes	(South Africa) Dale Hayes, (Rhodesia) Simon Hobday
3	18 Jul 1976	Scandinavian Enterprise Open	−17 (68-65-70-68=271)	2 strokes	(Republic of Ireland) Eamonn Darcy
4	21 May 1977	Sun Alliance Match Play Championship	6 and 5		(Wales) Brian Huggett
5	2 Sep 1979	Swiss Open (2)	−5 (68-67-73-67=275)	5 strokes	(Spain) Antonio Garrido, (South Africa) Dale Hayes, (Italy) Delio Lovato
6	9 Jul 1983	State Express Classic	−9 (70-68-70-71=279)	Playoff	(Republic of Ireland) Eamonn Darcy, (United States) Mike Sullivan

European Tour playoff record (1–1)

No.	Year	Tournament	Opponents	Result
1	1983	State Express Classic	(Republic of Ireland) Eamonn Darcy, (United States) Mike Sullivan	Won with birdie on first extra hole
2	1986	Benson & Hedges International Open	(England) Mark James, (United States) Lee Trevino	James won with birdie on first extra hole

=== Southern Africa Tour wins (11) ===
No.	Date	Tournament	Winning score	Margin of victory	Runner(s)-up
1	13 Jan 1973	NCR Western Province Open	E (76-70-74-72=292)	1 stroke	(Republic of Ireland) John O'Leary
2	10 Feb 1973	General Motors International Classic	−14 (68-70-74-70=282)	Playoff	(South Africa) Dale Hayes
3	22 Dec 1973	ICL Transvaal Open	−12 (68-67-71-70=276)	1 stroke	(South Africa) Dale Hayes
4	4 Dec 1976	Holiday Inns Invitational	−15 (69-65-70-69=273)	Playoff	(South Africa) Dale Hayes
5	11 Dec 1976	ICL International (2)	−12 (68-66-69-65=268)	1 stroke	(South Africa) Tienie Britz, (South Africa) Gary Player
6	19 Dec 1976	Rhodesian Dunlop Masters	−14 (67-72-66-69=274)	2 strokes	(South Africa) Andries Oosthuizen
7	9 Dec 1978	Yellow Pages South African Open	−3 (71-69-74-71=285)	1 stroke	(South Africa) Gavan Levenson
8	16 Nov 1980	Zimbabwe Open	−9 (67-70-70-72=279)	Playoff	(South Africa) Allan Henning, (Zimbabwe) Denis Watson
9	22 Nov 1980	Lexington PGA Championship	−12 (65-68-68-67=268)	1 stroke	(Zimbabwe) Mark McNulty, (South Africa) Gary Player
10	31 Jan 1981	Vaal Reefs Open	−12 (70-69-68-69=276)	2 strokes	(South Africa) Tienie Britz
11	17 Dec 1989	Twee Jonge Gezellen Masters	−7 (69-68-74-70=281)	1 stroke	(South Africa) Tertius Claassens, (South Africa) Ernie Els, (United States) Rick Hartmann

Southern Africa Tour playoff record (3–5)

No.	Year	Tournament	Opponent(s)	Result
1	1972	Glen Anil Classic	(England) Peter Oosterhuis	Lost to birdie on second extra hole
2	1973	General Motors International Classic	(South Africa) Dale Hayes	Won with par on second extra hole
3	1976	Rhodesian Dunlop Masters	(South Africa) Allan Henning	Lost to par on third extra hole
4	1976	Holiday Inns Invitational	(South Africa) Dale Hayes	Won with par on fourth extra hole
5	1978	ICL International	(South Africa) Dale Hayes	Lost to par on third extra hole
6	1980	Zimbabwe Open	(South Africa) Allan Henning, (Zimbabwe) Denis Watson	Won with birdie on first extra hole
7	1985	Palabora Classic	(Zimbabwe) Mark McNulty	Lost to birdie on fifth extra hole
8	1995	Phalaborwa Mafunyane Trophy	(South Africa) Roger Wessels	

=== Other wins (4) ===
- 1980 BCA Tournament
- 1989 Murphy's Cup, SA Railfreight
- 2002 Nelson Mandela Invitational (with Deane Pappas)

=== Senior PGA Tour wins (3) ===
No.	Date	Tournament	Winning score	Margin of victory	Runner(s)-up
1	31 Aug 1997	Pittsburgh Senior Classic	−10 (70-70-66=206)	Playoff	(United States) Bob Duval
2	13 Sep 1998	Comfort Classic	−20 (66-63-67=196)	2 strokes	(United States) Bruce Summerhays
3	20 Sep 1998	Kroger Senior Classic	−7 (67-66=133) (Note: Shortened to 36 holes due to weather.)	Playoff	(New Zealand) Bob Charles, (United States) Frank Conner, (United States) Larry Nelson, (United States) Bruce Summerhays

Senior PGA Tour playoff record (2–2)

No.	Year	Tournament	Opponent(s)	Result
1	1997	Cadillac NFL Golf Classic	(Australia) Bruce Crampton	Lost to birdie on third extra hole
2	1997	Saint Luke's Classic	(United States) Bruce Summerhays	Lost to par on second extra hole
3	1997	Pittsburgh Senior Classic	(United States) Bob Duval	Won with par on sixth extra hole
4	1998	Kroger Senior Classic	(New Zealand) Bob Charles, (United States) Frank Conner, (United States) Larry Nelson, (United States) Bruce Summerhays	Won with birdie on second extra hole

== Results in major championships ==
Tournament	1972	1973	1974	1975	1976	1977	1978	1979	1980	1981	1982	1983	1984	1985	1986	1987	1988
Masters Tournament			T31	T22	CUT												
U.S. Open								WD									
The Open Championship	CUT	T18	CUT	T23	CUT	CUT	CUT	T41	T29	CUT	CUT	CUT	T9	T35	CUT	T66	CUT

Note: Baiocchi never played in the PGA Championship.

Top 10
Did not play

CUT = missed the half-way cut (3rd round cut in 1972, 1976, 1977, 1978, 1982 and 1983 Open Championships)
WD = Withdrew
"T" indicates a tie for a place

=== Summary ===
Tournament	Wins	2nd	3rd	Top-5	Top-10	Top-25	Events	Cuts made
Masters Tournament	0	0	0	0	0	1	3	2
U.S. Open	0	0	0	0	0	0	1	0
The Open Championship	0	0	0	0	1	3	17	7
PGA Championship	0	0	0	0	0	0	0	0
Totals	0	0	0	0	1	4	21	9

- Most consecutive cuts made – 2 (four times)
- Longest streak of top-10s – 1

== Team appearances ==
Amateur

- Commonwealth Tournament (representing South Africa): 1967
- Eisenhower Trophy (representing South Africa): 1968, 1970

Professional

- Double Diamond International (representing the Rest of the World): 1972, 1973, 1976, 1977 (captain)
- World Cup (representing South Africa): 1973, 1977
- Datsun International (representing South Africa): 1976 (winners)
- Hennessy Cognac Cup (representing the Rest of the World): 1982
