= Gary Player =

South African professional golfer (born 1935)

Gary Player DMS OIG
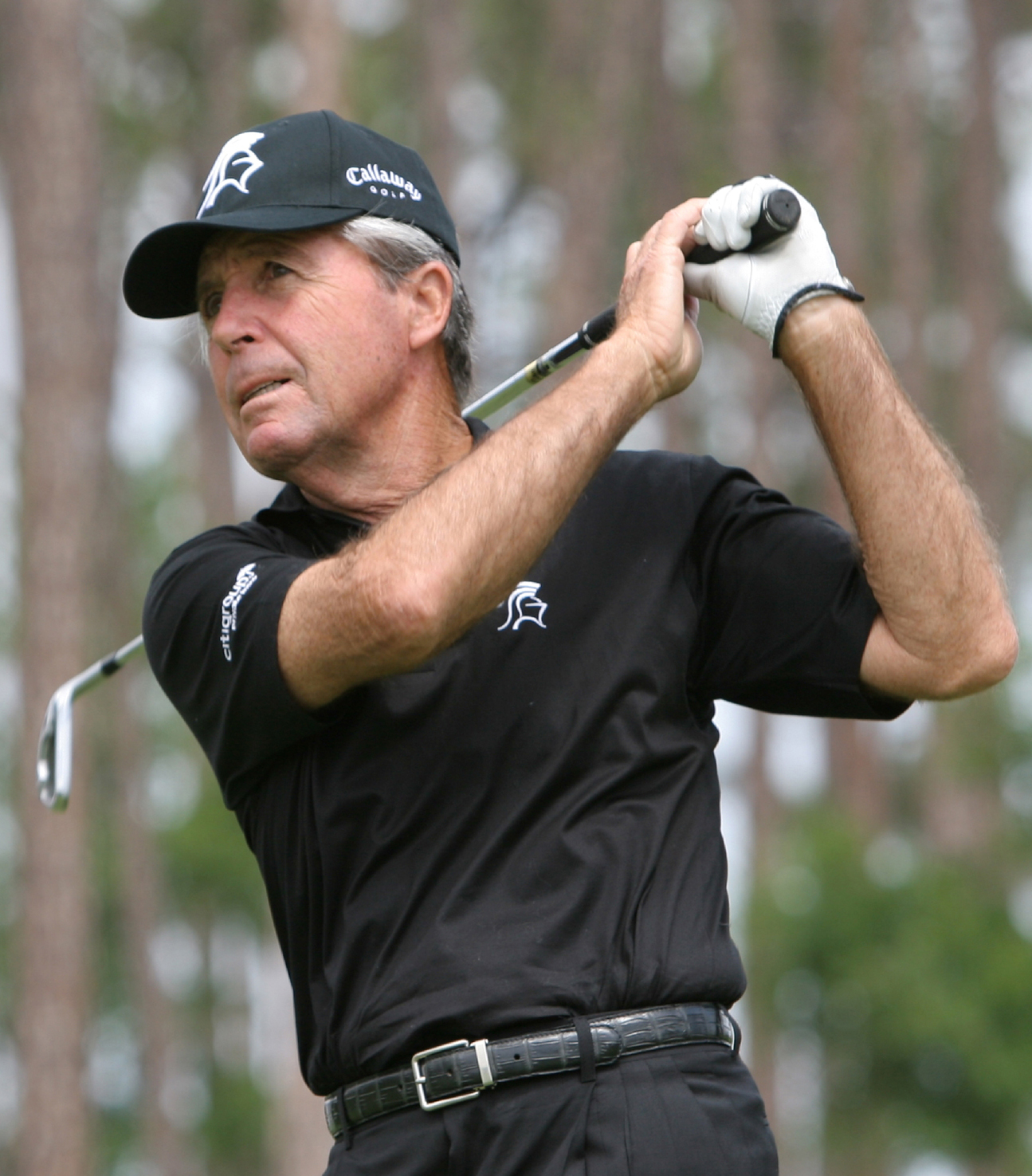
- Player in 2008

Personal information
- Full name: Gary James Player
- Nicknames: The Black Knight, Mr Fitness
- Nationality: South Africa
- Born: 1 November 1935 (age 91) Johannesburg, Union of South Africa
- Height: 5 ft 6 in (168 cm)
- Weight: 150 lb (68 kg; 11 st)
- Spouse: Vivienne Verwey (m. 1957; died 2021)
- Children: 6

Career
- Sport: Golf
- Turned professional: 1953
- Former tours: PGA Tour; Southern Africa Tour; Champions Tour
- Professional wins: 159

Number of wins by tour
- PGA Tour: 24
- European Tour: 4
- Sunshine Tour: 20
- PGA Tour of Australasia: 2
- PGA Tour Champions: 22 (Tied-7th all-time)
- European Senior Tour: 3
- Other: 63 (regular); 6 (senior)

Best results in major championships (wins: 9)
- Masters Tournament: Won: 1961, 1974, 1978
- PGA Championship: Won: 1962, 1972
- U.S. Open: Won: 1965
- The Open Championship: Won: 1959, 1968, 1974

Achievements and awards
- World Golf Hall of Fame: 1974 (member page)
- PGA Tour money list winner: 1961
- Southern Africa Tour Order of Merit winner: 1976–77, 1979–80
- PGA Tour Lifetime Achievement Award: 2012
- Presidential Medal of Freedom: 2021
- (For a full list of awards, see here)

Gary James Player OIG (born 1 November 1935) is a South African retired professional golfer who is widely considered to be one of the greatest golfers of all time. Player won over 160 professional tournaments across six continents, including nine major championships.

Following victories at the 1959 Open Championship, 1961 Masters Tournament and 1962 PGA Championship, Player won the 1965 U.S. Open to become the first non-American to win the career grand slam. He was the third golfer to win the modern career grand slam, and only three more players have achieved the feat since. Player was inducted into the World Golf Hall of Fame in 1974.

Nicknamed "the Black Knight", "Mr Fitness", and "the International Ambassador of Golf", Player has been prolific as a golf course architect with more than 400 design projects throughout the world. He has also authored or co-written 36 books on golf instruction, design, philosophy, motivation and fitness. In 2021, Player was awarded the Presidential Medal of Freedom by United States president Donald Trump.

== Background and family ==
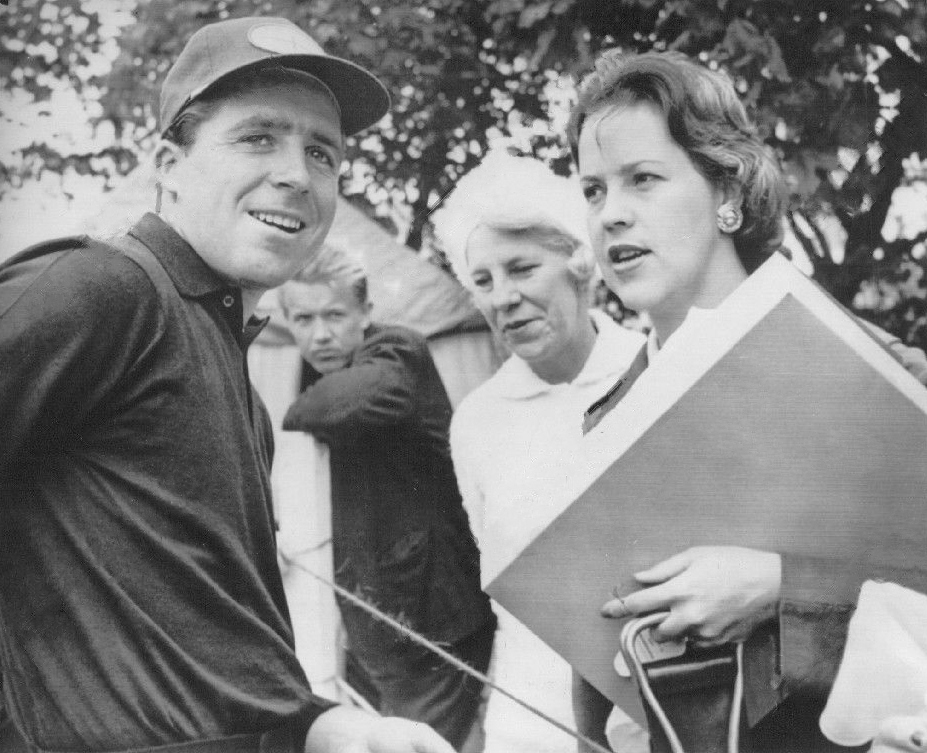
Player with his wife (holding object) and her mother, who were his dedicated supporters at golf tournaments, 1961

Player was born in Johannesburg, South Africa, the youngest of Muriel and Harry Player's three children. At age 17, he became a professional golfer.

Player married wife Vivienne Verwey (sister of professional golfer Bobby Verwey) on 19 January 1957, four years after turning professional. Together they had six children: Jennifer, Marc, Wayne, Michele, Theresa, and Amanda. He also has 22 grandchildren and two great-grandchildren. During the early days of his career, Player would travel from tournament to tournament with his wife, six children, their nanny and a tutor in tow. Vivienne died of cancer in August 2021.

Player's eldest son, Marc, owns and operates The Player Group, including all trademarks and intellectual property. The Player Group exclusively represents Player in all his commercial activities, including all endorsements, licensing, merchandising, golf course design, and real estate development. In 2020, Player won a legal battle against the Gary Player Group. He was awarded $5 million and the rights to his name and likeness back from the company.

Today, the Gary & Vivienne Player Foundation (established after Vivienne's death in 2022) operates in South Africa and the United States.

Player is the brother of Ian Player, a South African environmental educator, activist and conservationist.

== Playing career ==
Player is one of the most successful golfers in history, tied for fourth in major championship victories with nine. Along with Arnold Palmer and Jack Nicklaus he is often referred to as one of "The Big Three" golfers of the mid-1960's. From the late 1950s through the late 1970s golf boomed in the United States and around the world and was greatly encouraged by expanded television coverage. Along with Gene Sarazen, Ben Hogan, Jack Nicklaus, Tiger Woods and Rory McIlroy, he is one of only six players to win golf's "career Grand Slam". He completed the Grand Slam in 1965 at the age of 29. At the time, he was the youngest player to do this, though Jack Nicklaus (26) and Tiger Woods (24) subsequently broke this record. Player was the second multiple majors winner from South Africa, following Bobby Locke, then was followed by Ernie Els, and Retief Goosen.

Player competed regularly on the U.S. based PGA Tour from the late 1950s. He led the Tour money list in 1961, and went on to accumulate 24 career Tour titles. He also played an exceptionally busy schedule all over the world, and he has been called the world's most traveled athlete. Player has logged more than 26 million km (16 million mi) in air travel – in 2005 it was estimated that he had "probably flown further … than any athlete in history".

Player has more victories than anyone else in the South African Open (13) and the Australian Open (7). He held the record for most victories in the World Match Play Championship, with five wins, from 1973 until 1991 when this feat was equalled by Seve Ballesteros, finally losing his share of the record in 2004, when Ernie Els won the event for the sixth time. Player was in the top ten of Mark McCormack's world golf rankings from their inception in 1968 until 1981; he was ranked second in 1969, 1970 and 1972, each time to Jack Nicklaus.

Player was the only player in the 20th century to win the British Open in three different decades. His first win, as a 23-year-old in 1959 at Muirfield, came after he double-bogeyed the last hole. In 1974, he became one of the few golfers in history to win two major championships in the same season. Player last won the Masters in 1978, when he started seven strokes behind 54-hole leader Hubert Green entering the final round, and won by one shot with birdies at seven of the last 10 holes for a back nine 30 and a final round 64. One week later, Player again came from seven strokes back in the final round to win the Tournament of Champions. In 1984, at the age of 48 Player nearly became the oldest ever major champion, finishing in second place behind Lee Trevino at the PGA Championship. And in gusty winds at the 1998 Masters, he became the oldest golfer ever to make the cut, breaking the 25-year-old record set by Sam Snead. Player credited this feat to his dedication to the concept of diet, health, practice and golf fitness.

Player has occasionally been accused of cheating, particularly in the 1974 Open; he has strongly denied the accusations. Later, at a skins game in Arizona in 1983, Tom Watson accused him of cheating by moving a leaf from behind his ball.

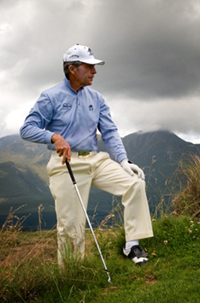
Player at the Fancourt Golf Resort in South Africa, 2008

Being South African, Player never played in the Ryder Cup in which American and European golfers compete against each other. Regarding the event, Player remarked, "The things I have seen in the Ryder Cup have disappointed me. You are hearing about hatred and war." He was no longer an eligible player when the Presidents Cup was established to give international players the opportunity to compete in a similar event, but he was non-playing captain of the International Team for the Presidents Cup in 2003, which was held on a course he designed, The Links at Fancourt, in George, South Africa. After 2003 ended in a tie, he was reappointed as captain for the 2005 Presidents Cup, and his team lost to the Americans 15.5 to 18.5. Both Player and Jack Nicklaus were appointed to captain their respective teams again in 2007 in Canada; the United States won.

=== Augusta National green jacket ===
The green jacket is reserved for Augusta National members and golfers who win the Masters Tournament. Jackets are kept on club grounds, and taking them off the premises is forbidden. The exception is for the winner, who can take it home and return it to the club the following year. Player, who became the tournament's first international winner in 1961, said he did not know that, he packed the jacket and took it to his home in South Africa. That led to a call from club Chairman Clifford Roberts, who was a stickler for rules. "I didn't know you were supposed to leave it there," Player said. "Next thing you know, there was a call from Mr. Roberts."

== Legacy ==
In 2000, Player was voted "Sportsman of the Century" in South Africa. In 1966, he was awarded the Bob Jones Award, the highest honour given by the United States Golf Association in recognition of distinguished sportsmanship in golf. He was inducted into the World Golf Hall of Fame in 1974. The "Gary Player – A Global Journey" exhibition was launched by the Hall of Fame as of March 2006.

In 2000, Golf Digest magazine ranked Player as the eighth greatest golfer of all time.

On 10 April 2009, he played for the last time in the Masters, where he was playing for his record 52nd time – every year since 1957 except for 1973, when he was recovering from surgery.

At age 73 on 23 July 2009, Player competed in the Senior British Open Championship at Sunningdale Golf Club, 53 years after capturing his maiden European Tour victory at the Berkshire venue.

Augusta National Golf Club and the Masters announced on 5 July 2011 that Player had been invited to join Jack Nicklaus and Arnold Palmer as an honorary starter. The Big Three were reunited in this capacity starting with the 2012 tournament.

In July 2013, Player became the oldest athlete ever to pose nude in ESPN The Magazine's annual Body Issue to inspire people to keep looking after themselves throughout their lives whatever their age.

== Views ==
=== Views on apartheid ===
In 1966, Player espoused support for the apartheid policies of Hendrik Verwoerd in his book Grand Slam Golf, stating: "I must say now, and clearly, that I am of the South Africa of Verwoerd and apartheid ... a nation which ... is the product of its instinct and ability to maintain civilised values and standards amongst the alien barbarians. The African may well believe in witchcraft and primitive magic, practise ritual murder and polygamy; his wealth is in cattle". Activists publicly demonstrated against Player's espousal of apartheid, including protesting against Player at the 1969 PGA Championship. Australian activists also strongly protested against Player. In 1971 there were several threats to protest against Player at tournaments though they never came to fruition. In October 1974, Australian activists screamed at Player, "Go home, racist!", as he was lining up a putt on the 72nd hole in a tournament he had a chance to win.

In a 1987 interview with The Los Angeles Times, Player disavowed the system of apartheid, stating, "We have a terrible system in apartheid ... it's almost a cancerous disease. I'm happy to say it's being eliminated. [...] We've got to get rid of this apartheid." In an interview with Graham Bensinger, Player discussed his early support for apartheid stating that the South African Government had "pulled the wool over our eyes" and that the people were "brainwashed" into supporting these policies.

=== Views on golf ===
In July 2007, Player made statements at the Open Championship golf tournament about the use of performance-enhancing drugs in golf. He alleged that at least ten players were "taking something", citing human growth hormone, steroids and creatine as possible substances. Both the PGA Tour and European Tour were in the process of introducing random testing programmes at the time.

In June 2016, in an interview with bunkered.co.uk, Player branded as "laughable" a report released by the R&A and USGA governing bodies which said that driving distance in golf was only increasing minimally. He warned of a "tsunami coming" due to the governing bodies' failure to address issues surrounding new golf technology. After the 2017 Alfred Dunhill Links Championship, Player reiterated these comments, taking to messaging service Twitter to say he was sad to see the Old Course at St Andrews "brought to her knees" after Ross Fisher broke the course record on a day of very low scoring during the final round.

== Distinctions and honours ==
- On 8 June 1961, Player was the guest on NBC's The Ford Show, Starring Tennessee Ernie Ford. In a comedy skit, he gives Tennessee Ernie Ford a golf lesson.
- Received the 1965 BBC Overseas Sports Personality of the Year Award.
- Received the 1966 Bob Jones Award from the United States Golf Association.
- Named Honorary Member of the Royal and Ancient Golf Club of St Andrews in 1994.
- Received Honorary Doctor of Laws Degree from University of St Andrews in 1995.
- Received Honorary Doctor of Science from the University of Ulster, Northern Ireland in 1997
- The WGC-Bridgestone Invitational trophy is named the Gary Player Cup.
- Named Honorary Member of Carnoustie in 1999
- Received Honorary Doctorate in Law, University of Dundee, Scotland in 1999
- South African Sportsman of the Century award in 2000
- Received the 2003 Laureus Lifetime Achievement Award at the Laureus World Sports Awards in Monte Carlo.
- Awarded the Order of Ikhamanga (in gold for exceptional achievement) in 2003 by President Mbeki of South Africa for excellence in golf and contribution to non-racial sport in South Africa.
- He was the world's first golfer to be featured on any country's postal stamp in South Africa.
- Has designed over 400 golf courses on six continents around the world.
- He received the 2006 Payne Stewart Award from the PGA Tour.
- Played in his 52nd Masters Tournament at Augusta National in April 2009, extending his record of for most Masters appearances
- Inducted into the African American Sports Hall of Fame in May 2007, with Lifetime Achievement Award
- Has played in a record 46 consecutive British Open Championships, winning 3 times over 3 decades.
- Stars with Camilo Villegas in a MasterCard "priceless foursome" television commercial launched during the U.S. Open in June 2009
- In November 2009 he was awarded the inaugural Breeders Cup "Sports and Racing Excellence Award" at Santa Anita Park in California which honours owners and breeders of thoroughbred race horses.
- Was inducted into the Asian Pacific Golf Hall of Fame with Jack Nicklaus in 2011 at a ceremony in Pattaya, Thailand.
- In December 2011, Gary Player Design was selected amongst the finalists to design the golf course for the 2016 Olympic Games in Rio de Janeiro
- He received the PGA Tour Lifetime Achievement Award at The Players Championship in May 2012. The first international person to receive this accolade.
- Received the 2020 GCSAA Old Tom Morris Award from the Golf Course Superintendents Association of America
- Received the Presidential Medal of Freedom on 7 January 2021 from then President Donald Trump.
- With the death of Jack Burke Jr., Player becomes the oldest living Masters champion.

== Professional wins (159) ==
=== PGA Tour wins (24) ===
Legend
Major championships (9)
Other PGA Tour (15)

No.	Date	Tournament	Winning score	Margin of victory	Runner(s)-up
1	20 Apr 1958	Kentucky Derby Open	−14 (68-68-69-69=274)	3 strokes	(United States) Chick Harbert, (United States) Ernie Vossler
2	3 Jul 1959	The Open Championship	−4 (75-71-70-68=284)	2 strokes	(England) Fred Bullock, (Belgium) Flory Van Donck
3	29 Jan 1961	Lucky International Open	−12 (70-69-68-65=272)	2 strokes	(United States) George Bayer, (United States) Don Whitt
4	26 Mar 1961	Sunshine Open Invitational	−15 (69-68-67-69=273)	1 stroke	(United States) Arnold Palmer
5	10 Apr 1961	Masters Tournament	−8 (69-68-69-74=280)	1 stroke	(United States) Charles Coe, (United States) Arnold Palmer
6	22 Jul 1962	PGA Championship	−2 (72-67-69-70=278)	1 stroke	(United States) Bob Goalby
7	13 Jan 1963	San Diego Open Invitational	−14 (65-65-70-70=270)	1 stroke	(United States) Tony Lema
8	9 Mar 1964	Pensacola Open Invitational	−14 (71-68-66-69=274)	Playoff	(United States) Miller Barber, (United States) Arnold Palmer
9	31 May 1964	500 Festival Open Invitation	−11 (70-66-70-67=273)	1 stroke	(United States) Doug Sanders, (United States) Art Wall Jr.
10	21 Jun 1965	U.S. Open	+2 (70-70-71-71=282)	Playoff	(Australia) Kel Nagle
11	13 Jul 1968	The Open Championship (2)	+1 (74-71-71-73=289)	2 strokes	(New Zealand) Bob Charles, (United States) Jack Nicklaus
12	20 Apr 1969	Tournament of Champions	−4 (69-74-69-72=284)	2 strokes	(United States) Lee Trevino
13	5 Apr 1970	Greater Greensboro Open	−13 (70-63-73-65=271)	2 strokes	(United States) Miller Barber
14	21 Mar 1971	Greater Jacksonville Open	−7 (70-70-72-69=281)	Playoff	(United States) Hal Underwood
15	28 Mar 1971	National Airlines Open Invitational	−14 (69-67-70-68=274)	2 strokes	(United States) Lee Trevino
16	26 Mar 1972	Greater New Orleans Open	−9 (73-69-68-69=279)	1 stroke	(United States) Dave Eichelberger, (United States) Jack Nicklaus
17	6 Aug 1972	PGA Championship (2)	+1 (71-71-67-72=281)	2 strokes	(United States) Tommy Aaron, (United States) Jim Jamieson
18	9 Sep 1973	Southern Open	−10 (69-65-67-69=270)	1 stroke	(United States) Forrest Fezler
19	14 Apr 1974	Masters Tournament (2)	−10 (71-71-66-70=278)	2 strokes	(United States) Dave Stockton, (United States) Tom Weiskopf
20	26 May 1974	Danny Thomas Memphis Classic	−15 (65-72-69-67=273)	2 strokes	(United States) Lou Graham, (United States) Hubert Green
21	13 Jul 1974	The Open Championship (3)	−2 (69-68-75-70=282)	4 strokes	(England) Peter Oosterhuis
22	9 Apr 1978	Masters Tournament (3)	−11 (72-72-69-64=277)	1 stroke	(United States) Rod Funseth, (United States) Hubert Green, (United States) Tom Watson
23	16 Apr 1978	MONY Tournament of Champions (2)	−7 (70-68-76-67=281)	2 strokes	(United States) Andy North, (United States) Lee Trevino
24	23 Apr 1978	Houston Open	−18 (64-67-70-69=270)	1 stroke	(United States) Andy Bean

PGA Tour playoff record (3–10)

No.	Year	Tournament	Opponent(s)	Result
1	1958	Dallas Open Invitational	(United States) Julius Boros, (United States) John McMullin, (United States) Sam Snead	Snead won with birdie on first extra hole
2	1959	Memphis Open	(Canada) Al Balding, (United States) Don Whitt	Whitt won with par on second extra hole Balding eliminated by birdie on first hole
3	1961	American Golf Classic	(United States) Jay Hebert	Lost to birdie on second extra hole
4	1962	Masters Tournament	(United States) Dow Finsterwald, (United States) Arnold Palmer	Palmer won 18-hole playoff; Palmer: −4 (68), Player: −1 (71), Finsterwald: +5 (77)
5	1962	Memphis Open Invitational	(United States) Lionel Hebert, (United States) Gene Littler	Hebert won with birdie on first extra hole
6	1963	Palm Springs Golf Classic	(United States) Jack Nicklaus	Lost 18-hole playoff; Nicklaus: −7 (65), Player: +1 (73)
7	1964	Pensacola Open Invitational	(United States) Miller Barber, (United States) Arnold Palmer	Won 18-hole playoff; Player: −1 (71), Palmer: E (72), Barber: +2 (74)
8	1965	U.S. Open	(Australia) Kel Nagle	Won 18-hole playoff; Player: +1 (71), Nagle: +4 (74)
9	1967	Oklahoma City Open Invitational	(United States) Miller Barber	Lost to birdie on third extra hole
10	1968	Azalea Open Invitational	(United States) Steve Reid	Lost to birdie on second extra hole
11	1971	Greater Jacksonville Open	(United States) Hal Underwood	Won with par on second extra hole
12	1971	Kemper Open	(United States) Dale Douglass, (United States) Lee Trevino, (United States) Tom Weiskopf	Weiskopf won with birdie on first extra hole
13	1975	MONY Tournament of Champions	(United States) Al Geiberger	Lost to birdie on first extra hole

=== European Tour wins (4) ===
Legend
Major championships (4)
Other European Tour (0)

No.	Date	Tournament	Winning score	Margin of victory	Runner(s)-up
1	6 Aug 1972	PGA Championship (Note: Not a European Tour event at the time, but retrospectively counted as an official win.)	+1 (71-71-67-72=281)	2 strokes	(United States) Tommy Aaron, (United States) Jim Jamieson
2	14 Apr 1974	Masters Tournament	−10 (71-71-66-70=278)	2 strokes	(United States) Dave Stockton, (United States) Tom Weiskopf
3	13 Jul 1974	The Open Championship	−2 (69-68-75-70=282)	4 strokes	(England) Peter Oosterhuis
4	9 Apr 1978	Masters Tournament (2)	−11 (72-72-69-64=277)	1 stroke	(United States) Rod Funseth, (United States) Hubert Green, (United States) Tom Watson

European Tour playoff record (0–2)

No.	Year	Tournament	Opponent(s)	Result
1	1974	Dunlop Masters	(Scotland) Bernard Gallacher	Lost to birdie on first extra hole
2	1976	Penfold PGA Championship	(England) Neil Coles, (Republic of Ireland) Eamonn Darcy	Coles won with par on third extra hole Player eliminated by par on first hole

=== Southern Africa Tour wins (20) ===
No.	Date	Tournament	Winning score	Margin of victory	Runner(s)-up
1	15 Jan 1972	NCR Western Province Open	−10 (69-69-67-73=278)	4 strokes	(South Africa) Cobie Legrange
2	22 Jan 1972	Dunlop South African Masters	−17 (71-65-65-66=267)	3 strokes	(South Africa) Bobby Cole
3	12 Feb 1972	South African Open	−18 (69-71-66-68=274)	1 stroke	(South Africa) Bobby Cole
4	2 Dec 1972	Dunlop South African Masters (2)	−12 (65-68-68-67=268)	1 stroke	(South Africa) Harold Henning
5	26 Jan 1974	Dunlop South African Masters (3)	−10 (69-66-70-75=270)	Playoff	(South Africa) Bobby Cole
6	9 Feb 1974	General Motors International Classic	−13 (71-70-71-71=283)	5 strokes	(South Africa) Hugh Baiocchi, (South Africa) John Fourie
7	23 Nov 1974	General Motors International Classic (2)	−16 (71-67-72-70=280)	1 stroke	(South Africa) Andries Oosthuizen
8	1 Feb 1975	BP South African Open (2)	−10 (68-67-72-71=278)	6 strokes	(South Africa) Allan Henning
9	13 Dec 1975	General Motors International Classic (3)	−11 (74-70-68-73=285)	3 strokes	(South Africa) John Fourie
10	7 Feb 1976	Dunlop South African Masters (4)	−12 (68-63-67-70=268)	1 stroke	(South Africa) Cobie Legrange
11	6 Nov 1976	Dunlop South African Masters (5)	−10 (67-65-70-68=270)	4 strokes	(South Africa) Hugh Baiocchi, (South Africa) Simon Hobday
12	27 Nov 1976	Yellow Pages South African Open (3)	−8 (70-68-73-69=280)	6 strokes	(South Africa) David Suddards (a), (South Africa) Bobby Verwey
13	12 Nov 1977	Yellow Pages South African Open (4)	−15 (69-71-63-70=273)	3 strokes	(South Africa) Bobby Cole, (South Africa) Dale Hayes
14	19 Nov 1977	ICL International	−12 (67-66-66-69=268)	2 strokes	(South Africa) Bobby Cole
15	23 Nov 1979	Lexington PGA Championship	−7 (71-66-66=203) (Note: Shortened to 36/54 holes due to weather.)	1 stroke	(South Africa) Bobby Cole, (South Africa) Harold Henning, (Zimbabwe Rhodesia) Nick Price, (Zimbabwe Rhodesia) Denis Watson
16	1 Dec 1979	SAB South African Masters (6)	−18 (67-65-70-68=270)	6 strokes	(Republic of Ireland) John O'Leary
17	8 Dec 1979	British Airways/Yellow Pages South African Open (5)	−9 (67-75-71-66=279)	1 stroke	(England) Ian Mosey
18	15 Dec 1979	Sun City Classic	−10 (70-71-67-70=278)	4 strokes	(South Africa) Bobby Verwey
19	5 Dec 1981	Datsun South African Open (6)	−16 (67-72-67-66=272)	Playoff	(South Africa) John Bland, (England) Warren Humphreys
20	16 Jan 1982	Lexington PGA Championship (2)	−8 (68-70-66-68=272)	3 strokes	(Scotland) Gordon Brand Jnr, (Zimbabwe) Mark McNulty, (United States) Bill Rogers

Southern Africa Tour playoff record (2–0)

No.	Year	Tournament	Opponent(s)	Result
1	1974	Dunlop South African Masters	(South Africa) Bobby Cole	Won with par on second extra hole
2	1981	Datsun South African Open	(South Africa) John Bland, (England) Warren Humphreys	Won with birdie on third extra hole after 18-hole playoff; Player: −2 (70), Bland: −2 (70), Humphreys: E (72)

=== PGA Tour of Australia wins (2) ===
No.	Date	Tournament	Winning score	Margin of victory	Runner-up
1	3 Nov 1974	Qantas Australian Open	−11 (69-72-63-73=277)	3 strokes	(Scotland) Norman Wood
2	15 Nov 1981	Tooth Gold Coast Classic	−13 (65-71-72-67=275)	4 strokes	(Australia) Bob Shearer

PGA Tour of Australia playoff record (0–1)

No.	Year	Tournament	Opponents	Result
1	1979	Victorian Open	(Australia) Rodger Davis, (Australia) Geoff Parslow	Davis won with birdie on second extra hole

=== Safari Circuit wins (1) ===
No.	Date	Tournament	Winning score	Margin of victory	Runner-up
1	9 Mar 1980	Trophée Félix Houphouët-Boigny	−23 (66-66-69-64=265)	Playoff	(England) Peter Townsend

=== South American Golf Circuit wins (1) ===
No.	Date	Tournament	Winning score	Margin of victory	Runner-up
1	9 Nov 1980	Chile Open	−4 (72-67-74-71=284)	1 stroke	(United States) Alan Pate

=== Other European wins (10) ===
No.	Date	Tournament	Winning score	Margin of victory	Runner-up
1	4 May 1956	Dunlop Tournament	70-64-64-72-68=338	2 strokes	(England) Arthur Lees
2	16 Oct 1965	Piccadilly World Match Play Championship	3 and 2		(Australia) Peter Thomson
3	8 Oct 1966	Piccadilly World Match Play Championship (2)	6 and 4		(United States) Jack Nicklaus
4	12 Oct 1968	Piccadilly World Match Play Championship (3)	1 up		(New Zealand) Bob Charles
5	9 Oct 1971	Piccadilly World Match Play Championship (4)	5 and 4		(United States) Jack Nicklaus
6	13 Oct 1973	Piccadilly World Match Play Championship (5)	40th hole		(Australia) Graham Marsh
7	8 Nov 1974	La Manga International Pro-Am	−42 (67-54-63-60=244)	Playoff	(England) Clive Clark
8	10 Nov 1974	European Ibergolf Trophy	+1 (73-72=145)	Playoff	(England) Peter Townsend
9	12 Oct 1975	Trophée Lancôme	−10 (73-65-69-71=278)	6 strokes	(United States) Lanny Wadkins
10	21 Oct 1984	Johnnie Walker Trophy	−16 (68-71-66-67=272)	Playoff	(Spain) Seve Ballesteros

=== Japan wins (2) ===
No.	Date	Tournament	Winning score	Margin of victory	Runner(s)-up
1	6 Nov 1961	Yomiuri Pro Championship	+1 (75-72-72-70=289)	5 strokes	(Taiwan) Chen Ching-Po
2	14 May 1972	Japan Airlines Open	−8 (67-71-72-70=280)	1 stroke	(Taiwan) Lu Liang-Huan, (Japan) Tōru Nakamura, (Australia) Peter Thomson, (Japan) Haruo Yasuda

=== Other South African wins (39) ===
- 1955 East Rand Open
- 1956 East Rand Open, South African Open
- 1957 Western Province Open
- 1958 Natal Open
- 1959 East Rand Open, Natal Open, South African Professional Match Play Championship, Transvaal Open
- 1960 Natal Open, South African Masters, Transvaal Open, Western Province Open, South African Open
- 1961 Transvaal Open (Dec.)
- 1962 Transvaal Open
- 1963 Liquid Air Tournament, Richelieu Grand Prix (Cape Town), Richelieu Grand Prix (Johannesburg), Sponsored 5000
- 1964 South African Masters
- 1965 South African Open
- 1966 Natal Open, Transvaal Open, South African Open
- 1967 South African Masters, South African Open
- 1968 Natal Open, Western Province Open, South African Open
- 1969 South African PGA Championship, South African Open
- 1971 General Motors Open, South African Masters, Western Province Open
- 1974 Rand International Open
- 1986 Nissan Skins Game
- 1988 Nissan Skins Game
- 1991 Nissan Skins Game

=== Other Australasian wins (17) ===
No.	Date	Tournament	Winning score	Margin of victory	Runner(s)-up
1	19 Sep 1956	Western Australian Open	69-27-74-74=289	5 strokes	(Australia) Len Thomas
2	7 Oct 1956	North Coast Open	−4 (69-67=136)	Playoff	(Australia) Norm Berwick
3	17 Nov 1956	Ampol Tournament	66-73-69-72=280	6 strokes	(United States) Bo Wininger
4	13 Oct 1957	North Coast Open (2)	−5 (68-67=135)	1 stroke	(Australia) Eric Cremin
5	2 Nov 1957	Ampol Tournament (2)	74-70-66-71=281	2 strokes	(Wales) Dave Thomas
6	21 Nov 1957	Australian PGA Championship	2 up		(Australia) Peter Thomson
7	30 Aug 1958	Australian Open	68-67-70-66=271	5 strokes	(Australia) Kel Nagle
8	7 Nov 1959	Victorian Open	−17 (70-69-69-67=275)	5 strokes	(South Africa) Harold Henning
9	14 Nov 1959	Ampol Tournament (3)	73-70-69=212	Shared title with (Australia) Kel Nagle	
10	28 Oct 1961	Wills Classic	−2 (78-68-71-69=286)	3 strokes	(Australia) Eric Cremin
11	3 Nov 1962	Australian Open (2)	69-70-71-71=281	2 strokes	(Australia) Kel Nagle
12	2 Nov 1963	Australian Open (3)	−18 (70-70-70-68=278)	7 strokes	(Australia) Bruce Devlin
13	30 Oct 1965	Australian Open (4)	−28 (62-71-62-69=264)	6 strokes	(Australia) Frank Phillips, (United States) Jack Nicklaus
14	10 Nov 1968	Wills Masters	−15 (69-70-66-72=277)	Playoff	(England) Peter Townsend
15	26 Oct 1969	Australian Open (5)	E (64-69-68-77=288)	1 stroke	(England) Guy Wolstenholme
16	25 Oct 1970	Australian Open (6)	−8 (71-65-70-74=280)	3 strokes	(Australia) Bruce Devlin
17	1 Nov 1970	Dunlop International	−6 (71-67-73-71=282)	1 stroke	(United States) Bill Brask, (Australia) Kel Nagle, (United States) Lee Trevino

=== Other South American wins (2) ===
No.	Date	Tournament	Winning score	Margin of victory	Runner-up
1	24 Nov 1972	Brazil Open	−6 (65-68-68-69=270)	10 strokes	(United States) Steve Melnyk
2	1 Dec 1974	Brazil Open (2)	−9 (67-59-70-71=267)	5 strokes	(United States) Mark Hayes

=== Other wins (11) ===
- 1955 Egyptian Matchplay
- 1965 World Series of Golf, NTL Challenge Cup (Canada), World Cup of Golf, World Cup of Golf Individual Trophy
- 1968 World Series of Golf
- 1972 World Series of Golf
- 1977 World Cup of Golf Individual Trophy
- 1979 PGA Grand Slam of Golf (shared title with Andy North)
- 1983 Skins Game
- 1986 Fred Meyer Challenge (with Greg Norman - team shared title with Peter Jacobsen and Curtis Strange)

=== Senior PGA Tour wins (22) ===
Legend
Senior PGA Tour major championships (9)
Other Senior PGA Tour (13)

No.	Date	Tournament	Winning score	Margin of victory	Runner(s)-up
1	23 Nov 1985	Quadel Seniors Classic	−11 (73-64-68=205)	3 strokes	(United States) Jim Ferree, (United States) Ken Still
2	16 Feb 1986	General Foods PGA Seniors' Championship	−7 (68-68-73-72=281)	2 strokes	(United States) Lee Elder
3	18 May 1986	United Hospitals Senior Golf Championship	−4 (66-70-70=206)	1 stroke	(New Zealand) Bob Charles, (United States) Lee Elder
4	1 Jun 1986	Denver Post Champions of Golf	−8 (70-67-71=208)	Playoff	(Argentina) Roberto De Vicenzo
5	14 Jun 1987	Mazda Senior Tournament Players Championship	−8 (69-73-69-69=280)	1 stroke	(Australia) Bruce Crampton, (United States) Chi-Chi Rodríguez
6	12 Jul 1987	U.S. Senior Open	−14 (69-68-67-66=270)	6 strokes	(United States) Doug Sanders
7	13 Sep 1987	PaineWebber World Seniors Invitational	−9 (68-67-72=207)	Playoff	(New Zealand) Bob Charles
8	14 Feb 1988	General Foods PGA Seniors' Championship (2)	−4 (69-73-72=70=284)	3 strokes	(United States) Chi-Chi Rodríguez
9	28 Feb 1988	Aetna Challenge	−9 (70-70-67=207)	1 stroke	(United States) Dave Hill
10	26 Jun 1988	Silver Pages Classic	−13 (69-68-66=203)	Playoff	(South Africa) Harold Henning
11	24 Jul 1988	Volvo Seniors' British Open	−8 (65-66-72-69=272)	1 stroke	(United States) Billy Casper
12	8 Aug 1988	U.S. Senior Open (2)	E (74-71-70-73=288)	Playoff	(New Zealand) Bob Charles
13	11 Sep 1988	GTE North Classic	−15 (70-65-66=201)	2 strokes	(United States) Dave Hill
14	10 Sep 1989	GTE North Classic (2)	−9 (67-68=135)	1 stroke	(United States) Billy Casper, (United States) Al Geiberger, (United States) Joe Jimenez
15	8 Oct 1989	RJR Championship	−3 (65-71-71=207)	1 stroke	(United States) Rives McBee
16	15 Apr 1990	PGA Seniors' Championship (3)	−7 (74-69-65-73=281)	2 strokes	(United States) Chi-Chi Rodríguez
17	29 Jul 1990	Volvo Seniors' British Open (2)	E (69-65-71-75=280)	1 stroke	(United States) Deane Beman, (England) Brian Waites
18	3 Feb 1991	Royal Caribbean Classic	−13 (67-65-68=200)	2 strokes	(New Zealand) Bob Charles, (United States) Chi-Chi Rodríguez, (United States) Lee Trevino
19	19 Sep 1993	Bank One Senior Classic	−14 (68-68-66=202)	3 strokes	(United States) Dale Douglass
20	24 Sep 1995	Bank One Classic (2)	−5 (72-75-64=211)	2 strokes	(United States) Jack Kiefer
21	27 Jul 1997	Senior British Open (3)	−10 (68-70-72-68=278)	Playoff	(South Africa) John Bland
22	23 Aug 1998	Northville Long Island Classic	−12 (68-68-68=204)	1 stroke	(United States) Walter Hall, (United States) J. C. Snead

Senior PGA Tour playoff record (5–2)

No.	Year	Tournament	Opponent	Result
1	1986	Denver Post Champions of Golf	(Argentina) Roberto De Vicenzo	Won with par on fourth extra hole
2	1987	PaineWebber World Seniors Invitational	(New Zealand) Bob Charles	Won with birdie on first extra hole
3	1988	Silver Pages Classic	(South Africa) Harold Henning	Won with birdie on first extra hole
4	1988	U.S. Senior Open	(New Zealand) Bob Charles	Won 18-hole playoff; Player: −4 (68), Charles: −2 (70)
5	1990	Bell Atlantic Classic	(United States) Dale Douglass	Lost to par on second extra hole
6	1996	FHP Health Care Classic	(United States) Walter Morgan	Lost to birdie on first extra hole
7	1997	Senior British Open	(South Africa) John Bland	Won with birdie on second extra hole

=== European Seniors Tour wins (3) ===
Legend
Senior major championships (1)
Other European Seniors Tour (2)

No.	Date	Tournament	Winning score	Margin of victory	Runner(s)-up
1	15 Aug 1993	Belfast Telegraph Irish Senior Masters	−5 (68-68-72=208)	2 strokes	(Spain) José María Roca
2	27 Jul 1997	Senior British Open	−10 (68-70-72-68=278)	Playoff	(South Africa) John Bland
3	3 Aug 1997	Shell Wentworth Senior Masters	−9 (69-68-70=207)	1 stroke	(Spain) José María Cañizares, (England) David Creamer

European Seniors Tour playoff record (1–0)

No.	Year	Tournament	Opponent	Result
1	1997	Senior British Open	(South Africa) John Bland	Won with birdie on second extra hole

=== Other senior wins (6) ===
- 1987 Northville Invitational (United States), German PGA Team Championship
- 1997 Dai-ichi Seimei Cup (Japan)
- 2000 Senior Skins Game (U.S. – unofficial event)
- 2009 Liberty Mutual Legends of Golf – Demaret Division (with Bob Charles)
- 2010 Liberty Mutual Legends of Golf – Demaret Division (with Bob Charles)

^{*}The Senior British Open was retroactively recognised by the PGA Tour Champions as a senior major in 2018.

== Major championships ==
=== Wins (9) ===
Year	Championship	54 holes	Winning score	Margin	Runner(s)-up
1959	The Open Championship	4 shot deficit	−4 (75-71-70-68=284)	2 strokes	(England) Fred Bullock, (Belgium) Flory Van Donck
1961	Masters Tournament	4 shot lead	−8 (69-68-69-74=280)	1 stroke	(United States) Charles Coe, (United States) Arnold Palmer
1962	PGA Championship	2 shot lead	−2 (72-67-69-70=278)	1 stroke	(United States) Bob Goalby
1965	U.S. Open	2 shot lead	+2 (70-70-71-71=282)	Playoff^{1}	(Australia) Kel Nagle
1968	The Open Championship (2)	2 shot deficit	+1 (74-71-71-73=289)	2 strokes	(New Zealand) Bob Charles, (United States) Jack Nicklaus
1972	PGA Championship (2)	1 shot lead	+1 (71-71-67-72=281)	2 strokes	(United States) Tommy Aaron, (United States) Jim Jamieson
1974	Masters Tournament (2)	1 shot deficit	−10 (71-71-66-70=278)	2 strokes	(United States) Dave Stockton, (United States) Tom Weiskopf
1974	The Open Championship (3)	3 shot lead	−2 (69-68-75-70=282)	4 strokes	(England) Peter Oosterhuis
1978	Masters Tournament (3)	7 shot deficit	−11 (72-72-69-64=277)	1 stroke	(United States) Rod Funseth, (United States) Hubert Green, (United States) Tom Watson

^{1}Defeated Nagle in 18-hole playoff; Player 71 (+1), Nagle 74 (+4).

=== Results timeline ===
Tournament	1956	1957	1958	1959
Masters Tournament		T24	CUT	T8
U.S. Open			2	T15
The Open Championship	4	T24	7	1
PGA Championship				

Tournament	1960	1961	1962	1963	1964	1965	1966	1967	1968	1969
Masters Tournament	T6	1	2	T5	T5	T2	T28	T6	T7	T33
U.S. Open	T19	T9	T6	T8	T23	1	T15	T12	T16	T48
The Open Championship	7	WD	CUT	T7	T8	WD	T4	T3	1	T23
PGA Championship		T29	1	T8	T13	T33	T3			2

Tournament	1970	1971	1972	1973	1974	1975	1976	1977	1978	1979
Masters Tournament	3	T6	T10		1	T30	T28	T19	1	T17
U.S. Open	T44	T27	T15	12	T8	T43	T23	T10	T6	T2
The Open Championship	CUT	T7	6	T14	1	T32	T28	T22	T34	T19
PGA Championship	T12	T4	1	T51	7	T33	T13	T31	T26	T23

Tournament	1980	1981	1982	1983	1984	1985	1986	1987	1988	1989
Masters Tournament	T6	T15	T15	CUT	T21	T36	CUT	T35	CUT	CUT
U.S. Open	CUT	T26	CUT	T20	T43				CUT	CUT
The Open Championship	CUT	CUT	T42	CUT	CUT	CUT	T35	T66	T60	CUT
PGA Championship	T26	T49	CUT	T42	T2	CUT				

Tournament	1990	1991	1992	1993	1994	1995	1996	1997	1998	1999
Masters Tournament	T24	CUT	CUT	60	CUT	CUT	CUT	CUT	46	CUT
U.S. Open										
The Open Championship	CUT	T57	CUT	CUT	CUT	T68	CUT	CUT	CUT	CUT
PGA Championship										

Tournament	2000	2001	2002	2003	2004	2005	2006	2007	2008	2009
Masters Tournament	CUT	CUT	CUT	CUT	CUT	CUT	CUT	CUT	CUT	CUT
U.S. Open										
The Open Championship	CUT	CUT								
PGA Championship										

Win
Top 10
Did not play

CUT = missed the halfway cut (3rd round cut in 1970, 1980, 1981 and 1985 Open Championships)
WD = withdrew
"T" = indicates a tie for a place.

=== Summary ===
Tournament	Wins	2nd	3rd	Top-5	Top-10	Top-25	Events	Cuts made
Masters Tournament	3	2	1	8	15	22	52	30
U.S. Open	1	2	0	3	9	19	29	25
The Open Championship	3	0	1	6	12	17	46	26
PGA Championship	2	2	1	6	8	12	23	21
Totals	9	6	3	23	44	70	150	102

- Most consecutive cuts made – 37 (1970 PGA – 1980 Masters)
- Longest streak of top-10s – 6 (1962 PGA – 1964 Masters)

== Results in The Players Championship ==
Tournament	1974	1975	1976	1977	1978	1979	1980	1981	1982	1983	1984
The Players Championship	CUT	T21	T9	T13	T28	CUT	T8	CUT	CUT		61

Top 10
Did not play

CUT = missed the halfway cut
"T" indicates a tie for a place

== Senior major championships ==
=== Wins (9) ===
Year	Championship	Winning score	Margin	Runner(s)-up
1986	General Foods PGA Seniors' Championship	−7 (68-68-73-72=281)	2 strokes	(United States) Lee Elder
1987	U.S. Senior Open	−14 (69-68-67-66=270)	6 strokes	(United States) Doug Sanders
1987	Mazda Senior Tournament Players Championship	−8 (69-73-69-69=280)	1 stroke	(Australia) Bruce Crampton (United States) Chi-Chi Rodríguez
1988	General Foods PGA Seniors' Championship (2)	−4 (69-73-72-70=284)	3 strokes	(United States) Chi-Chi Rodríguez
1988	Volvo Seniors' British Open	−8 (65-66-72-69=272)	1 stroke	(United States) Billy Casper
1988	U.S. Senior Open (2)	E (74-70-71-73=288)	Playoff^{1}	(New Zealand) Bob Charles
1990	PGA Seniors' Championship (3)	−7 (74-69-65-73=281)	2 strokes	(United States) Chi-Chi Rodríguez
1990	Volvo Seniors' British Open (2)	E (69-65-71-75=280)	1 stroke	(United States) Deane Beman, (England) Brian Waites
1997	Senior British Open (3)	−10 (68-70-72-68=278)	Playoff^{2}	(South Africa) John Bland

^{1}Defeated Charles in 18-hole playoff; Player (68), Charles (70).
^{2}Defeated Bland with a birdie on the second hole of a sudden-death playoff.

=== Results timeline ===
Tournament	1986	1987	1988	1989
Senior PGA Championship	1	T8	1	T8
U.S. Senior Open	2	1	1	T9
The Tradition	NYF	NYF	NYF	2
Senior Players Championship	T14	1	T3	3

Tournament	1990	1991	1992	1993	1994	1995	1996	1997	1998	1999
Senior PGA Championship	1	T8	5	T16	T19	T60	T31	T20	T39	T43
U.S. Senior Open	T3	T8	T3	T17	T13	T19	T60	T21		
The Tradition	2	T15	T20	T17	T27	T17	T9	T51	T17	T50
Senior Players Championship	T18	T43	T18	T33	T42		T49	T49		T29

Tournament	2000	2001	2002	2003	2004	2005	2006	2007	2008	2009
Senior PGA Championship	T46	T8	T45	CUT	CUT	CUT	CUT	CUT		
The Senior Open Championship	–^{1}	–^{1}	–^{1}	T51	CUT	T61	T65		CUT	CUT
U.S. Senior Open	CUT	57	CUT	T54	CUT		CUT			
The Tradition	T34	T19	T62	75	T64	T73	T76			67
Senior Players Championship	T57	T56			T58		T74			

^{1}The Senior Open Championship was not a Champions Tour major until 2003, though it was on the European Seniors Tour. Player won the event three times prior to this recognition.

Win
Top 10
Did not play

CUT = Missed the half-way cut
NYF = Tournament not yet founded
"T" = tied

== Team appearances ==
- World Cup (representing South Africa): 1956, 1957, 1958, 1959, 1960, 1962, 1963, 1964, 1965 (winners, individual winner), 1966, 1967, 1968, 1971, 1972, 1973, 1977 (individual winner)
- Slazenger Trophy (representing British Commonwealth and Empire): 1956
- Chrysler Cup (representing the International team): 1986 (captain), 1987 (captain, winners), 1988 (captain), 1989 (captain), 1990 (captain), 1991, 1992, 1993, 1994 (winners)
- Dunhill Cup (representing South Africa): 1991
- Alfred Dunhill Challenge (representing Southern Africa): 1995 (non-playing captain, winners)
- UBS Cup (representing the Rest of the World): 2001 (captain), 2002 (captain), 2004 (captain)
- Insperity Invitational – Greats of Golf: 2012 (winners), 2014 (winners), 2015 (winners), 2017 (winners)

== See also ==
- Career Grand Slam champions
- List of golfers with most Champions Tour major championship wins
- List of golfers with most Champions Tour wins
- List of golfers with most PGA Tour wins
- List of longest PGA Tour win streaks
- List of men's major championships winning golfers
