= Tienie Britz =

South African professional golfer

Personal information
- Nationality: South Africa
- Born: 14 May 1945 (age 81) Johannesburg, South Africa
- Height: 1.80 m (5 ft 11 in)
- Spouse: Frances
- Children: 2

Career
- Sport: Golf
- Turned professional: 1965
- Former tours: European Tour; Southern Africa Tour; European Seniors Tour
- Professional wins: 8

Number of wins by tour
- European Tour: 1
- Sunshine Tour: 4
- Other: 3

Best results in major championships
- Masters Tournament: DNP
- PGA Championship: DNP
- U.S. Open: DNP
- The Open Championship: T19: 1983

Achievements and awards
- Southern Africa Tour Order of Merit winner: 1971–72

Tienie Britz (born 14 May 1945) is a South African professional golfer.

== Early life ==
Britz was born in Johannesburg.

== Professional career ==
Britz won the South African PGA Championship twice in 1971 and led the South African Tour Order of Merit in 1971/72. He has also played extensively on the European Tour and the European Seniors Tour. His best finish on the European Tour's Order of Merit was 19th place in 1977. That year he also won his only event on the tour at the German Open, having had to pre-qualify first. Britz represented South Africa three times in the World Cup: in Australia with Gary Player, in Thailand with John Bland, and in Columbia with Bobby Verwey.

Since 1986, Britz has been the head teaching professional at Broome Park Golf Club in Barham, near Canterbury, Kent, England.

== Professional wins (8) ==
=== European Tour wins (1) ===
No.	Date	Tournament	Winning score	Margin of victory	Runner-up
1	7 Aug 1977	German Open	−13 (66-67-71-71=275)	2 strokes	(South Africa) Hugh Baiocchi

=== Southern Africa Tour wins (4) ===
No.	Date	Tournament	Winning score	Margin of victory	Runner(s)-up
1	27 Nov 1971	Luyt Lager PGA Championship	−8 (69-72-69-70=280)	Playoff	(Rhodesia) Don Gammon, (England) Peter Oosterhuis
2	29 Jan 1972	Natal Open	−6 (71-73-70-68=282)	1 stroke	(Rhodesia) Simon Hobday
3	14 Jan 1979	Kalahari Classic	−14 (64-72-66=202)	Playoff	(South Africa) Jannie Legrange
4	19 Jan 1980	Kalahari Classic (2)			(South Africa) Hugh Baiocchi

Southern Africa Tour playoff record (2–2)

No.	Year	Tournament	Opponent(s)	Result
1	1971	Luyt Lager PGA Championship	(Rhodesia) Don Gammon, (England) Peter Oosterhuis	Won 18-hole playoff; Britz: −5 (67), Oosterhuis: −2 (70), Gammon: −1 (71)
2	1972	ICL Transvaal Open	(South Africa) Bobby Cole	Lost to birdie on first extra hole
3	1978	Kronenbrau Masters	(South Africa) Dale Hayes	Lost to birdie on third extra hole
4	1979	Kalahari Classic	(South Africa) Jannie Legrange	

=== Other wins (2) ===
- 1969 Bush Babes Open
- 1971 Bush Babes Open, South African PGA Championship (Feb)

== Results in major championships ==
Tournament	1971	1972	1973	1974	1975	1976	1977	1978	1979	1980	1981	1982	1983	1984
The Open Championship	T49	T59			T32			T29			CUT	T47	T19	CUT

Note: Britz only played in The Open Championship.

Did not play

CUT = missed the half-way cut (3rd round cut in 1981 Open Championship)
"T" indicates a tie for a place

== Team appearances ==
- World Cup (representing South Africa): 1972, 1975, 1980
