= Western Province Open =

Tournament information
- Established: 1936
- Tour: Southern African Tour
- Format: Stroke play
- Month played: January
- Final year: 1976

Tournament record score
- Aggregate: 268 Gary Player (1971)
- To par: −16 as above

Final champion
- (South Africa) Allan Henning

The Western Province Open was a golf tournament in South Africa as part of the Southern Africa Tour. In the early years of the tournament, Bobby Locke and Harold Henning had much success, winning the event multiple times each. During the middle and later phase of the tournament legend Gary Player had much success, ultimately winning the event five times.

== History ==
Bobby Locke, Gary Player, Harold Henning, and Bobby Verwey had the most success in the early years of the tournament. In 1956, Locke was victorious, defeating Australia's Peter Thomson by two shots. A young Gary Player finished solo third. The following year, Player and Henning shared the championship, three ahead of Locke, the third place finisher. Locke came back the following year with a blowout win, defeating joint runner-up Henning by 11 shots. Henning won the following year, defeating Eric Moore by two. Locke finished third at 283. Player won the following year but Henning captured the title again in 1961 defeating Bobby Verwey by a stroke. Two years later Verwey "led throughout" and defeated Eric Moore by four.

In the late 1960s and early 1970s, the tournament was dominated by Gary Player and Cobie Legrange. In 1968, Player set the course record in the third round on his way to an easy win. The following year, Legrange was victorious, defeating England's Peter Oosterhuis down the stretch. In 1970, Scotland's Bobby Walker won the tournament defeating fellow Briton Jimmy Hitchcock. According to The Guardian, Walker "became the first overseas player to win the Western Province open." In 1971, however, Player came back and won easily, winning by seven. The following year Player successfully defended his championship, defeating Legrange by four.

In the final years of the event, a variety of golfers had success. In 1973, Hugh Baiocchi overcame a two shot deficit to Ireland's John O'Leary and win. The following year, South African John Fourie won handily, defeating Legrange by seven. Fourie finished joint runner-up the following year, one behind champion Bill Brask. In 1976, at the final edition of the event, Allan Henning was victorious, defeating Baiocchi by six.

== Winners ==
Year	Winner	Score	To par	Margin of victory	Runner(s)-up	Ref.
1936	(England) Alf Padgham	278		6 strokes	(South Africa) Sid Brews (England) Bill Cox	
1956	(South Africa) Bobby Locke	287		2 strokes	(Australia) Peter Thomson	
1957	(South Africa) Harold Henning (South Africa) Gary Player	285		Tied		
1958	(South Africa) Bobby Locke (2)	286		11 strokes	(South Africa) Harold Henning (South Africa) Ronnie Glennie (a)	
1959	(South Africa) Harold Henning (2)	280		2 strokes	(South Africa) Eric Moore	
1960	(South Africa) Gary Player (2)	271				
1961	(South Africa) Harold Henning (3)	284		1 stroke	(South Africa) Bobby Verwey	
1962	(South Africa) Tommy Trevena	289				
1963	(South Africa) Bobby Verwey	286		4 strokes	(South Africa) Eric Moore	
1964	(South Africa) Retief Waltman					
1965	(South Africa) Allan Henning					
1966	(South Africa) Cobie Legrange					
1967	(South Africa) Denis Hutchinson					
1968	(South Africa) Gary Player (3)	280	−12	4 strokes	(England) Clive Clark	
1969	(South Africa) Cobie Legrange (2)	272	−12	2 strokes	(England) Peter Oosterhuis	
1970	(Scotland) Bobby Walker	284		1 stroke	(England) Jimmy Hitchcock	
1971	(South Africa) Gary Player (4)	268	−16	7 strokes	(South Africa) Harold Henning (United States) Craig Shankland	
1972	(South Africa) Gary Player (5)	278	−10	4 strokes	(South Africa) Cobie Legrange	
1973	(South Africa) Hugh Baiocchi	292	E	1 stroke	(Republic of Ireland) John O'Leary	
1974 (Jan)	(South Africa) John Fourie	277	−11	7 strokes	(South Africa) Cobie Legrange	
1974 (Nov)	(United States) Bill Brask	280	−4	1 stroke	(South Africa) John Fourie (South Africa) Allan Henning	
1975	No tournament due to rescheduling from November to January					
1976	(South Africa) Allan Henning	282	−6	6 strokes	(South Africa) Hugh Baiocchi	
