= 1993 European Tour =

Golf tour season

1993 European Tour season
- Duration: 14 January 1993 – 7 November 1993
- Number of official events: 38 (Note: A further two tournaments were scheduled but were cancelled.)
- Most wins: (Germany) Bernhard Langer (3) (Scotland) Sam Torrance (3)
- Order of Merit: (Scotland) Colin Montgomerie
- Golfer of the Year: (Germany) Bernhard Langer
- Sir Henry Cotton Rookie of the Year: (Scotland) Gary Orr

The 1993 European Tour, titled as the 1993 Volvo Tour for sponsorship reasons, was the 22nd season of the European Tour, the main professional golf tour in Europe since its inaugural season in 1972.

It was the sixth season of the tour under a title sponsorship agreement with Volvo, that was announced in May 1987.

== Changes for 1993 ==
The season was made up of 38 tournaments counting for the Order of Merit, and five non-counting "Approved Special Events".

There were few changes from the previous season, with the addition of the Madeira Island Open and a ProServ tournament in Bologna replacing the Volvo Open di Firenze. A new tournament was planned for South Africa but was not finalised.

The cancellation of the Monte Carlo Open in February prompted rescheduling of the Carroll's Irish Open to ensure there was no gap in the schedule prior to The Open Championship. The Honda Open, originally scheduled opposite the Dunhill Cup, was later moved to the fill the dates vacated by the Carroll's Irish Open. In early March, the Kronenbourg Open was added to replace the cancelled ProServ tournament.

== Schedule ==
The following table lists official events during the 1993 season.

Date	Tournament	Host country	Purse (£)	Winner (Note: The number in brackets after each winner's name is the number of European Tour events they had won up to and including that tournament. This information is only shown for European Tour members and are inclusive of the three United States-based major championships which were included on the schedule for the first time in 1998, with earlier editions having retrospectively been recognised as official tour wins.)	OWGR points	Notes
17 Jan	Madeira Island Open	Portugal	250,000	(England) Mark James (15)	20	New tournament
31 Jan	Dubai Desert Classic	UAE	US$500,000	(South Africa) Wayne Westner (1)	40	
7 Feb	Johnnie Walker Classic	Singapore	550,000	(England) Nick Faldo (27)	52	
14 Feb	Turespaña Iberia Open de Canarias	Spain	350,000	(England) Mark James (16)	26	
21 Feb	Moroccan Open	Morocco	375,000	(England) David Gilford (3)	30	
28 Feb	Turespaña Masters Open de Andalucía	Spain	350,000	(Scotland) Andrew Oldcorn (1)	38	
7 Mar	Turespaña Open Mediterrania	Spain	400,000	(New Zealand) Frank Nobilo (3)	40	
14 Mar	Turespaña Iberia Open de Baleares	Spain	300,000	(England) Jim Payne (1)	32	
21 Mar	Portuguese Open	Portugal	250,000	(England) David Gilford (4)	22	
~~28 Mar~~	ProServ Tournament	Italy	–	Cancelled	–	New tournament
28 Mar	Kronenbourg Open	Italy	200,000	(Scotland) Sam Torrance (15)	20	New tournament
4 Apr	Open de Lyon	France	250,000	(Italy) Costantino Rocca (1)	22	
11 Apr	Masters Tournament	United States	US$1,700,000	(Germany) Bernhard Langer (28)	100	Major championship (Note: Unofficial money event at the time, but retrospectively counted as an official win.)
18 Apr	Roma Masters	Italy	300,000	(France) Jean van de Velde (1)	20	
25 Apr	Heineken Open	Spain	300,000	(Scotland) Sam Torrance (16)	28	
2 May	Air France Cannes Open	France	400,000	(Australia) Rodger Davis (7)	34	
9 May	Benson & Hedges International Open	England	550,000	(England) Paul Broadhurst (3)	46	
16 May	Peugeot Spanish Open	Spain	500,000	(Sweden) Joakim Haeggman (1)	46	
23 May	Lancia Martini Italian Open	Italy	450,000	(New Zealand) Greg Turner (2)	36	
31 May	Volvo PGA Championship	England	700,000	(Germany) Bernhard Langer (29)	64	Flagship event
6 Jun	Dunhill British Masters	England	600,000	(England) Peter Baker (2)	48	
13 Jun	Honda Open	Germany	500,000	(Scotland) Sam Torrance (17)	38	
20 Jun	U.S. Open	United States	US$1,600,000	(United States) Lee Janzen (n/a)	100	Major championship
20 Jun	Jersey European Airways Open	Jersey	300,000	(South Africa) Ian Palmer (2)	20	
27 Jun	Peugeot Open de France	France	500,000	(Italy) Costantino Rocca (2)	38	
~~3 Jul~~	Monte Carlo Open	France	–	Cancelled	–	
4 Jul	Carroll's Irish Open	Ireland	575,000	(England) Nick Faldo (28)	50	
10 Jul	Bell's Scottish Open	Scotland	600,000	(Sweden) Jesper Parnevik (1)	42	
18 Jul	The Open Championship	England	1,000,000	(Australia) Greg Norman (13)	100	Major championship
25 Jul	Heineken Dutch Open	Netherlands	650,000	(Scotland) Colin Montgomerie (3)	46	
1 Aug	Scandinavian Masters	Sweden	650,000	(England) Peter Baker (3)	46	
8 Aug	BMW International Open	Germany	500,000	(Australia) Peter Fowler (1)	38	
15 Aug	Hohe Brücke Austrian Open	Austria	250,000	(Northern Ireland) Ronan Rafferty (7)	20	
15 Aug	PGA Championship	United States	US$1,700,000	(United States) Paul Azinger (n/a)	100	Major championship
22 Aug	Murphy's English Open	England	600,000	(Wales) Ian Woosnam (21)	38	
29 Aug	Volvo German Open	Germany	650,000	(Germany) Bernhard Langer (30)	42	
5 Sep	Canon European Masters	Switzerland	625,000	(England) Barry Lane (3)	42	
12 Sep	GA European Open	England	600,000	(Scotland) Gordon Brand Jnr (8)	50	
19 Sep	Trophée Lancôme	France	550,000	(Wales) Ian Woosnam (22)	50	Limited-field event
3 Oct	Mercedes German Masters	Germany	600,000	(England) Steven Richardson (3)	48	
10 Oct	Alfred Dunhill Open	Belgium	600,000	(Northern Ireland) Darren Clarke (1)	52	
31 Oct	Madrid Open	Spain	400,000	(Republic of Ireland) Des Smyth (7)	28	
7 Nov	Volvo Masters	Spain	750,000	(Scotland) Colin Montgomerie (4)	50	Tour Championship

=== Unofficial events ===
The following events were sanctioned by the European Tour, but did not carry official money, nor were wins official.

Date	Tournament	Host country	Purse (£)	Winner(s)	OWGR points	Notes
26 Sep	Ryder Cup	England	n/a	Team USA	n/a	Team event
17 Oct	Dunhill Cup	Scotland	US$1,500,000	Team USA	n/a	Team event
24 Oct	Toyota World Match Play Championship	England	600,000	(United States) Corey Pavin	46	Limited-field event
14 Nov	World Cup of Golf	United States	US$1,200,000	(United States) Fred Couples and (United States) Davis Love III	n/a	Team event
14 Nov	World Cup of Golf Individual Trophy	United States	US$1,200,000	(Germany) Bernhard Langer	n/a	
19 Dec	Johnnie Walker World Golf Championship	Jamaica	US$2,500,000	(United States) Larry Mize	58	Limited-field event

== Order of Merit ==
The Order of Merit was titled as the Volvo Order of Merit and was based on prize money won during the season, calculated in Pound sterling.

Position	Player	Prize money (£)
1	(Scotland) Colin Montgomerie	613,683
2	(England) Nick Faldo	558,738
3	(Wales) Ian Woosnam	501,353
4	(Germany) Bernhard Langer	469,570
5	(Scotland) Sam Torrance	421,328
6	(Italy) Costantino Rocca	403,866
7	(England) Peter Baker	387,989
8	(Northern Ireland) Darren Clarke	369,675
9	(Scotland) Gordon Brand Jnr	367,589
10	(England) Barry Lane	339,218

== Awards ==
Award	Winner	Ref.
Golfer of the Year	(Germany) Bernhard Langer	
Sir Henry Cotton Rookie of the Year	(Scotland) Gary Orr	

== See also ==
- 1993 Challenge Tour
- 1993 European Seniors Tour
