= Jay Townsend (golfer) =

American professional golfer (born 1962)

Personal information
- Nationality: United States
- Born: March 14, 1962 (age 64)
- Height: 6 ft 3 in (1.91 m)

Career
- Sport: Golf
- College: University of Florida
- Turned professional: 1984
- Former tours: European Tour; Southern Africa Tour
- Professional wins: 2

Number of wins by tour
- Sunshine Tour: 1
- Other: 1

Best results in major championships
- Masters Tournament: DNP
- PGA Championship: DNP
- U.S. Open: DNP
- The Open Championship: CUT: 1990, 1996

Jay Townsend (born March 14, 1962) is an American professional golfer and broadcaster.

== Early life and amateur career ==
Townsend was born in Michigan, but grew up primarily in Ohio. His father was a club professional. Townsend attended the University of Florida and was on the golf team. He was an All-American and graduated in 1984.

== Professional career ==
Townsend qualified for the European Tour in the fall of 1984. In his first season, Townsend played in 14 events and made the majority of cuts. However he did not record many high finishes while retaining his tour card. Townsend’s career in Europe stretched from 1985 through 1998. He says he enjoyed the experience in Europe immensely. He stated later in life, "I picked up more in my first five years in Europe than I did in 17 years of school at home. I saw the world and it made me a more rounded person."

During this interim period he played on the South African Tour. In 1988, he finished joint runner-up at the Bloemfontein Classic with John Bland behind Jeff Hawkes. At the very end of the 1988–89 season, he won the Trustbank Tournament of Champions over fellow American Bruce Vaughan. The following season, he finished runner-up at the 1990 Dewars W Lab Tournament, this time behind John Bland.

He recorded his first top-10 on the European Tour in 1991, a T-9 at the Murphy's Cup. His following year was his best season on the European Tour. In 1992 he made 16 of 24 cuts and finished in the top-100 of the Order of Merit for the first time. He also recorded his best finishes, placing T-5 at the Liebig Ligurian Open and T-3 at the Lyon Open V33 that summer. The following season, in 1993, he recorded his best finish of his European Tour career, a solo runner-up finish at the Heineken Open, three behind Scotland's Sam Torrance. In 1995, he recorded his best overall season in his career with 5 top-10s and finishing 43rd on the Order of Merit, both career bests. This success would continue through the early 1996 season as he would open with a 64 (−8) against an "elite field" at the Dubai Desert Classic, placing him in second place, one behind Miguel Ángel Jiménez. He followed that with three consecutive rounds of 71 to finish at –11 and a tie for 7th. His Official World Golf Ranking reached #173, the best so far of his career.

This high placing, however, would represent Townsend's career peak as he did not improve on his global ranking. He finished in a tie for third at the 1997 Alamo English Open which was his best finish of the season. Townsend finished no better than 89th on the Order of Merit in the late 1990s. He ceased playing as a touring professional during the 1998 season, retiring in mid-year.

=== Broadcasting career ===
Since retiring as a touring professional, Townsend has worked as a golf broadcaster. He has worked for the BBC, and more recently he has worked for European Tour Productions' "World Feed", which is broadcast to TV platforms around the world including Golf Channel in the United States. He says he has always enjoyed radio prior to his television career. In the mid-2000s, Townsend was the golf analyst for Network 10 in Australia for three seasons in addition to his work on the European Tour. He is currently also doing some analyst work for PGA Tour Live which is streamed on ESPN+

In 2011, Townsend criticized Rory McIlroy's "shocking course management" at the Irish Open. McIlroy responded angrily on Twitter, saying: "Shut up. You're a commentator and a failed golfer, your opinion means nothing." The media speculated that McIlroy might be fined by the European Tour.

== Personal life ==
Despite working mainly in Europe, Townsend's permanent residence is in Heber City, Utah. He is married to Betsy and has two children from a previous marriage, Zachary and Alexandra. He enjoys daily skiing in the winter months, fly fishing and is a pilot flying a Bearhawk Companion backcountry style plane to remote areas for fishing and hiking .

== Professional wins (2) ==
=== Southern Africa Tour wins (1) ===
Legend
Tour Championships (1)
Other Southern Africa Tour (0)

No.	Date	Tournament	Winning score	Margin of victory	Runner-up
1	Feb 25, 1989	Trustbank Tournament of Champions	−9 (67-70-67-71=275)	2 strokes	(United States) Bruce Vaughan

=== Other wins (1) ===
- 1997 Florida Open

== Results in major championships ==
Tournament	1990	1991	1992	1993	1994	1995	1996
The Open Championship	CUT						CUT

Did not play

CUT = missed the half-way cut
Note: Townsend only played in The Open Championship.
