= 1992 Volvo PGA Championship =

Tournament information
- Dates: 22–25 May 1992
- Location: Virginia Water, Surrey, England; 51.40°N 0.59°W
- Courses: Wentworth Club; West Course
- Tour: European Tour

Statistics
- Par: 72
- Field: 150 players, 68 after cut
- Cut: 145 (+1)
- Prize fund: €602,694
- Winner's share: €140,000

Champion
- (Zimbabwe) Tony Johnstone
- 272 (−16)

Location map
- Location in England Location in Surrey

The 1992 Volvo PGA Championship was the 38th edition of the Volvo PGA Championship, an annual professional golf tournament on the European Tour. It was held 22–25 May at the West Course of Wentworth Club in Virginia Water, Surrey, England, a suburb southwest of London.

Tony Johnstone shot a final-round 65 to win his first Volvo PGA Championship by two shots ahead of Gordon Brand Jnr and José María Olazábal.

== Round summaries ==
=== First round ===
Thursday, 22 May 1992

Place	Player	Score	To par
1	(England) David Gilford	64	−8
T2	(England) Peter Mitchell	65	−7
T2	(Wales) Mark Mouland	65	−7
T4	(England) Richard Boxall	67	−5
T4	(Scotland) Gordon Brand Jnr	67	−5
T4	(Scotland) John Chillas	67	−5
T4	(Australia) Rodger Davis	67	−5
T4	(Zimbabwe) Tony Johnstone	67	−5
T4	(Australia) Peter Senior	67	−5
T4	(England) Jamie Spence	67	−5

=== Second round ===
Friday, 23 May 1992

Place	Player	Score	To par
1	(England) Jamie Spence	67-66=133	−11
2	(England) Andrew Sherborne	70-65=135	−9
3	(Australia) Peter Senior	67-69=136	−8
T4	(Scotland) Gordon Brand Jnr	67-70=137	−7
T4	(England) David Gilford	64-73=137	−7
T4	(Zimbabwe) Tony Johnstone	67-70=137	−7
T7	(England) Nick Faldo	70-68=138	−6
T7	(England) Peter Mitchell	65-73=138	−6
T7	(Sweden) Johan Ryström	69-69=138	−6
T7	(England) David Williams	69-69=138	−6

=== Third round ===
Saturday, 24 May 1992

Place	Player	Score	To par
1	(Sweden) Magnus Sunesson	72-68-64=204	−12
2	(Scotland) Gordon Brand Jnr	67-60-68=205	−11
T3	(England) Gary Evans	74-66-66=206	−10
T3	(England) Andrew Sherborne	70-65-71=206	−10
T5	(England) Nick Faldo	70-68-69=207	−9
T5	(Zimbabwe) Tony Johnstone	67-70-70=207	−9
T5	(England) Peter Mitchell	65-73-69=207	−9
T5	(Republic of Ireland) Eoghan O'Connell	69-70-68=207	−9
T9	(Spain) José María Cañizares	70-72-66=208	−8
T9	(England) David Gilford	64-73-71=208	−8
T9	(Spain) José María Olazábal	71-70-67=208	−8
T9	(England) Jamie Spence	67-66-75=208	−8
T9	(England) Paul Way	71-69-68=208	−8
T9	(England) David Williams	69-69-70=208	−8

=== Final round ===
Sunday, 25 May 1992

Place	Player	Score	To par	Money (€)
1	(Zimbabwe) Tony Johnstone	67-70-70-65=272	−16	140,000
T2	(Scotland) Gordon Brand Jnr	67-70-68-69=274	−14	72,954
T2	(Spain) José María Olazábal	71-70-67-66=274	−14	72,954
T4	(England) Gary Evans	74-66-66-69=275	−13	38,780
T4	(Sweden) Magnus Sunesson	72-68-64-71=275	−13	38,780
T6	(Spain) José María Cañizares	70-72-66-68=276	−12	27,300
T6	(England) David Gilford	64-73-71-68=276	−12	27,300
7	(England) Nick Faldo	70-68-69-70=277	−11	21,000
8	(Sweden) Johan Ryström	69-69-72-68=278	−10	18,816
T9	(Scotland) Colin Montgomerie	70-72-67-70=279	−9	14,599
T9	(Argentina) Eduardo Romero	70-70-69-70=279	−9	14,599
T9	(Australia) Peter Senior	67-69-74-69=279	−9	14,599
T9	(England) Jamie Spence	67-66-75-71=279	−9	14,599
T9	(England) Paul Way	71-69-68-71=279	−9	14,599
