= 1987–88 Southern Africa Tour =

Golf tour season

1987–88 Southern Africa Tour season
- Duration: 11 November 1987 – 12 February 1988
- Number of official events: 14
- Most wins: (Zimbabwe) Tony Johnstone (3)
- Order of Merit: (South Africa) John Bland

The 1987–88 Southern Africa Tour was the 17th season of the Southern Africa Tour, the main professional golf tour in South Africa since it was formed in 1971.

== Season outline ==
Local golfers from Zimbabwe and South African had success at the beginning of the season. At the first event, the Minolta Copiers Match Play, Zimbabwe's Tony Johnstone defeated countryman Mark McNulty 66 to 69 in the medal match play final to claim victory. At the second tournament of the season, the Protea Assurance Classic, South Africa's Bobby Lincoln defeated compatriot Fulton Allem by one shot. The following week, Johnstone won for the second time, producing a victory at the Protea Assurance Challenge. The fourth event, Safmarine South African Masters, was won by South Africa's David Frost. South Africa's John Bland was the champion the following week at the Goodyear Classic. Allem won the fifth event of the season, the Palabora Classic. The following week, at the ICL International, defending champion Johnstone was victorious again.

A number of overseas golfers had much success during the middle of the season. At the eighth tournament of the season, the Lexington PGA Championship, Northern Irishman David Feherty won, defeating fellow Irishman Eamonn Darcy by one shot. Darcy was the "tournament favourite" at the following event, the Southern Suns South African Open. He was in good position entering the final round, in third place, but was late to his tee time and was disqualified. Darcy's "absence took the pressure off" for South Africa's Wayne Westner, the overnight leader. With a final round 71, Westner won by two strokes over England's Ian Mosey. South African Jeff Hawkes won the next event, the Bloemfontein Classic, defeating American Jay Townsend by one shot. The following week was the Danglo Tournament Players Championship. The event was won by Englishman Mark James. It was first win in South Africa. Late in the season, at the Helix Swazi Sun Classic, Americans Don Levin and Alan Pate were tied at the end of regulation. Levin defeated Pate at the first playoff hole.

The Order of Merit race ultimately came down to Tony Johnstone and John Bland at the final event of the season, the Trustbank Tournament of Champions. Johnstone held a slight lead on the Order of Merit. Bland needed a top two finish at the event to defeat him. Bland opened with a 67 to take the joint lead. Johnstone also played well and was only one back. Bland followed with a 66 to take the solo lead by two over Mark McNulty with Johnstone now in joint third, three back. In the third round, Bland shot a 67 to extend his lead while Johnstone shot a 73 to fall out of contention. Bland shot a final round 68 to secure the win. Johnstone finished in solo fourth place at the event. Bland's win secured the Order of Merit title.

== Schedule ==
The following table lists official events during the 1987–88 season.

Date	Tournament	Location	Purse (R)	Winner (Note: The number in brackets after each winner's name is the number of Southern Africa Tour events they had won up to and including that tournament. This information is only shown for Southern Africa Tour members.)	OWGR points	Notes
14 Nov	Minolta Copiers Match Play	Transvaal	175,000	(Zimbabwe) Tony Johnstone (6)	12	New tournament
21 Nov	Protea Assurance Classic	Transvaal	250,000	(South Africa) Bobby Lincoln (1)	12	New tournament
27 Nov	Protea Assurance Challenge	Cape	150,000	(Zimbabwe) Tony Johnstone (7)	12	
12 Dec	Safmarine South African Masters	Cape	175,000	(South Africa) David Frost (3)	10	
20 Dec	Goodyear Classic	Transvaal	150,000	(South Africa) John Bland (10)	10	
9 Jan	Palabora Classic	Transvaal	200,000	(South Africa) Fulton Allem (5)	8	
16 Jan	ICL International	Transvaal	200,000	(Zimbabwe) Tony Johnstone (8)	8	
23 Jan	Lexington PGA Championship	Transvaal	200,000	(Northern Ireland) David Feherty (2)	8	
31 Jan	Southern Suns South African Open	Natal	150,000	(South Africa) Wayne Westner (2)	16	
13 Feb	Bloemfontein Classic	Orange Free State	200,000	(South Africa) Jeff Hawkes (1)	10	New tournament
20 Feb	Danglo Tournament Players Championship	Transvaal	250,000	(England) Mark James (n/a)	10	New tournament
27 Feb	AECI Charity Classic	Transvaal	150,000	(South Africa) Bobby Lincoln (2)	10	
6 Mar	Helix Swazi Sun Classic	Swaziland	150,000	(United States) Don Levin (1)	8	
12 Mar	Trustbank Tournament of Champions	Transvaal	200,000	(South Africa) John Bland (11)	8	Tour Championship

=== Unofficial events ===
The following events were sanctioned by the Southern Africa Tour, but did not carry official money, nor were wins official.

Date	Tournament	Location	Purse (R)	Winner	OWGR points	Notes
6 Dec	Nedbank Million Dollar Challenge	Transvaal	US$1,000,000	(Wales) Ian Woosnam	22	Limited-field event

== Order of Merit ==
The Order of Merit was based on prize money won during the season, calculated in South African rand.

Position	Player	Prize money (R)
1	(South Africa) John Bland	143,301
2	(Zimbabwe) Tony Johnstone	139,132
3	(South Africa) Fulton Allem	95,273
4	(South Africa) Hugh Baiocchi	52,643
5	(Northern Ireland) David Feherty	87,519
