= Jeff Hawkes =

South African professional golfer (born 1953)

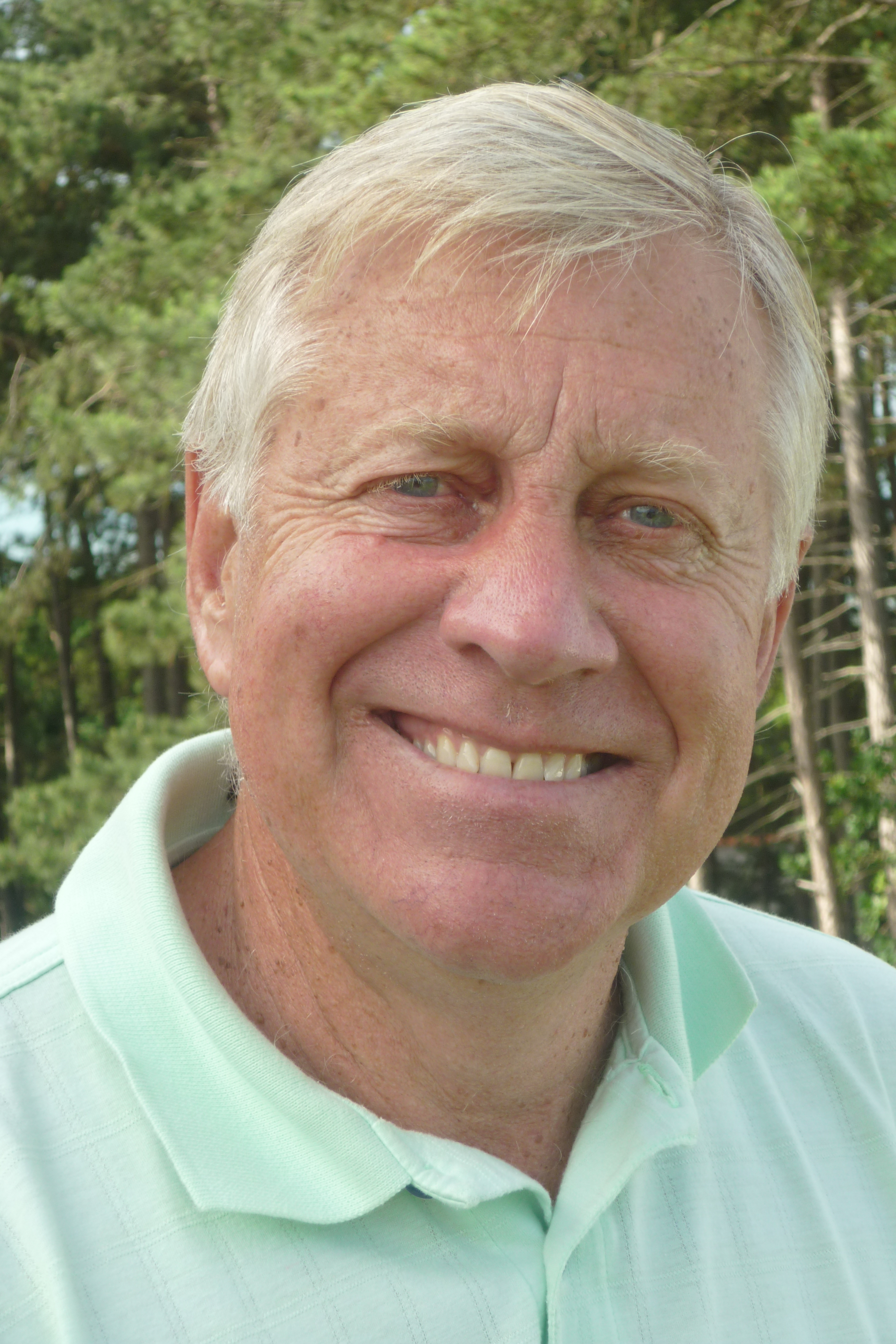

Personal information
- Full name: Jeffrey Owen Hawkes
- Nationality: South Africa
- Born: 3 September 1953 (age 73) Mthatha, Eastern Cape, South Africa
- Height: 1.77 m (5 ft 10 in)
- Children: 2

Career
- Sport: Golf
- Turned professional: 1974
- Former tours: European Tour; Sunshine Tour; European Senior Tour
- Professional wins: 5
- Highest ranking: 89 (30 July 1989)

Number of wins by tour
- European Tour: 1
- Sunshine Tour: 3
- Other: 1

Best results in major championships
- Masters Tournament: DNP
- PGA Championship: DNP
- U.S. Open: DNP
- The Open Championship: T30: 1989

Jeffrey Owen Hawkes (born 3 September 1953) is a South African professional golfer, who formerly played on the European Tour. In 1991, he won the Canon European Masters Swiss Open.

== Early life ==
Hawkes was born in Mthatha (then Umtata), Eastern Cape, South Africa. In addition to his home in Bruma near Johannesburg, he also resides in Bracknell, England.

== Amateur career ==
Hawkes represented South Africa at the 1974 Eisenhower Trophy in the Dominican Republic, where he finished tied tenth individually and fourth with his team, behind United States, Japan and Brazil.

== Professional career ==
In 1974, Hawkes turned professional. He played on the European Tour for over twenty years, making the top one hundred on the European Tour Order of Merit every year from 1977 to 1991, with a best ranking of 34th in 1987.

In 1982, Hawkes was part of the ten-man-team representing Rest of World, under the captaincy of Greg Norman, in the Hennessy Cognac Cup, a team event between Great Britain and Ireland, Continent of Europe and Rest of World.

In 1985, Hawkes finished second, reaching his best finish so far on the European Tour, at the Sanyo Open at Real Club de Golf El Prat, Terrassa, Barcelona, Spain. In May 1987, Hawkes finished second to Mats Lanner at the European Tour match-play event Epson Grand Prix of Europe Matchplay Championship at St Pierre Golf & Country Club in Wales, losing with 1 hole on the last green in the final. In the semi-final, Hawkes beat Seve Ballesteros 3 and 2. Another second place finish came at the 1989 Torras Monte Carlo Golf Open at Monte Carlo Golf Club outside Monaco.

His sole European Tour win came at the 1991 Canon European Masters Swiss Open, were he held on a late charge from Seve Ballesteros, who finished one shot behind.

Hawkes has also won three tournaments 1988-1989 on the Southern Africa Tour, later named the Sunshine Tour.

His best finish in a major championship was tied 30th in The 1989 Open Championship at Royal Troon Golf Club, Scotland, after which he reached a career best 89th on the Official World Golf Ranking.

Hawkes joined the European Seniors Tour in 2004, but did not win at that level, although his playing schedule was rather limited as he also worked as a golf commentator and analyst for Sky Sports in the United Kingdom and ran his own waste management business in South Africa. He played his last tournament in 2010.

== Professional wins (5) ==
=== European Tour wins (1) ===
No.	Date	Tournament	Winning score	Margin of victory	Runner-up
1	8 Sep 1991	Canon European Masters Swiss Open	−20 (68-69-65-66=268)	1 stroke	(Spain) Seve Ballesteros

=== Southern Africa Tour wins (3) ===
No.	Date	Tournament	Winning score	Margin of victory	Runner(s)-up
1	13 Feb 1988	Bloemfontein Classic	−20 (64-69-66-69=268)	1 stroke	(South Africa) John Bland, (United States) Jay Townsend
2	11 Feb 1989	AECI Charity Classic	−15 (67-64-70=201)	2 strokes	(Zimbabwe) Tony Johnstone
3	19 Feb 1989	Hollard Royal Swazi Sun Classic	−14 (67-66-69=202) (Note: Shortened to 54 holes due to weather.)	1 stroke	(United States) John Daly, (Eswatini) Joe Dlamini

=== Other wins (1) ===
- 1979 Rolex Pro-Am (Switzerland)

== Results in major championships ==
Tournament	1977	1978	1979	1980	1981	1982	1983	1984	1985	1986	1987	1988	1989	1990
The Open Championship	CUT					CUT		CUT		T46	74		T30	CUT

Note: Hawkes only played in The Open Championship.

Did not play

CUT = missed the half-way cut (3rd round cut in 1977 and 1982 Open Championships)
"T" = tied

== Team appearances ==
Amateur

- Eisenhower Trophy (representing South Africa): 1974

Professional

- Hennessy Cognac Cup (representing the Rest of the World): 1982

== See also ==
- Spring 1980 PGA Tour Qualifying School graduates
