= Mark James (golfer) =

English golfer (born 1953)

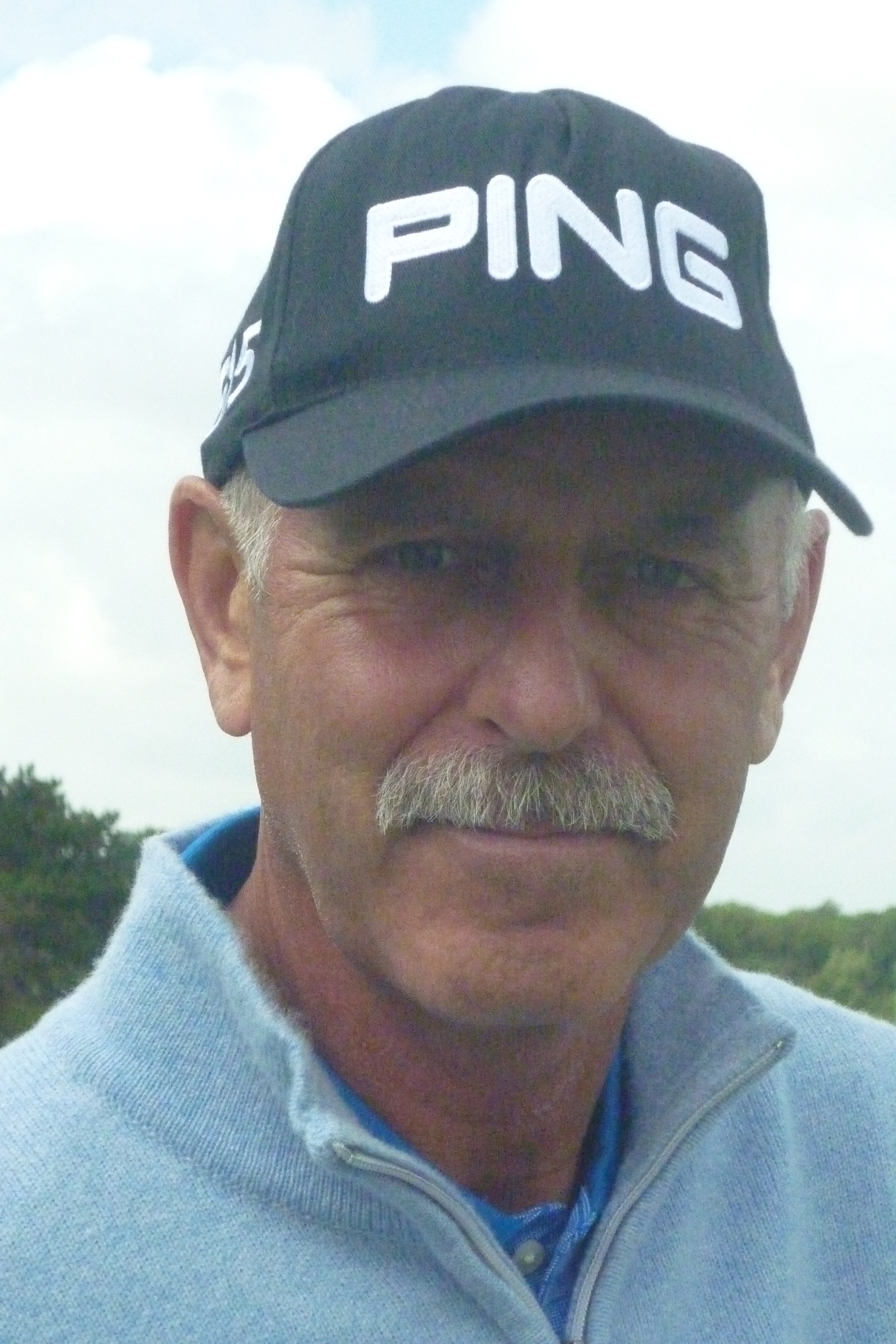
- James in 2011

Personal information
- Full name: Mark Hugh James
- Nickname: Jesse
- Nationality: England
- Born: 28 October 1953 (age 73) Manchester, England
- Height: 6 ft 0 in (1.83 m)
- Weight: 178 lb (81 kg; 12.7 st)

Career
- Sport: Golf
- Turned professional: 1976
- Current tour: European Senior Tour
- Former tours: European Tour; Champions Tour
- Professional wins: 32
- Highest ranking: 25 (5 May 1991)

Number of wins by tour
- European Tour: 18
- Sunshine Tour: 1
- PGA Tour Champions: 3
- European Senior Tour: 2
- Other: 8

Best results in major championships
- Masters Tournament: CUT: 1980
- PGA Championship: T31: 1999
- U.S. Open: CUT: 1990, 1996
- The Open Championship: T3: 1981

Achievements and awards
- Sir Henry Cotton Rookie of the Year: 1976

Mark Hugh James (born 28 October 1953) is an English professional golfer who had a long career on the European Tour and captained Europe in the 1999 Ryder Cup. He has also played senior golf on the European Senior Tour and the U.S.-based Champions Tour.

== Early life and amateur career ==
James was born in Manchester, England and educated at Stamford School. He won the English Amateur championship at Woodhall Spa in 1974 and was a member of the Great Britain & Ireland 1975 Walker Cup team.

== Professional career ==
=== European Tour ===
His first professional win was the 1977 Lusaka Open and the following year he picked up the first of his eighteen wins on the European Tour at the Sun Alliance Match Play Championship. He also holds the record for the highest European Tour event 18-hole-round of 111 strokes at the 1978 Italian Open in Sardinia, when refusing to with-draw despite an injury. Four years later he won the same tournament.

James never won a major championship, but he had four top-five finishes at The Open Championship. He was consistently competitive on the European Tour winning 12 times with 20 top-30 finishes on the Order of Merit, including seven top-10 finishes, the best of them third place in 1979. He was diagnosed with testicular cancer in 2000, but after treatment began playing golf again in 2001.

=== Ryder Cup ===
James represented Great Britain & Ireland or Europe in the Ryder Cup seven times. Future Ryder Cup-winning captain Tony Jacklin considered the "disruptive" behaviour of James and fellow player Ken Brown at the 1979 event "a total disgrace"; they were each fined and later banned from international matches. James was a member of the team in 1989 when Europe tied the match and retained the cup they had won in 1987, and 1995 when they won it outright. He was also European captain in the controversial "Battle of Brookline" in 1999, when the behaviour of the American galleries and team created a great deal of resentment in Europe, and also James' own actions during the matches drew fire from both sides of the Atlantic.

Prior to the event, James chose Andrew Coltart as his second captain's pick on the team, thus leaving out Nick Faldo and Bernhard Langer (veterans who were the two most successful players for the European team in Ryder Cup history). In one of the most discussed moves in the Ryder Cup, James then kept Jean van de Velde, Jarmo Sandelin and Coltart on the bench during all sixteen matches during the first two days of play, relegating them to singles matches on Sunday only. His refusal to play those three first-time players helped lead to Europe's defeat, as none of the three won their one match. On the other hand, United States captain Ben Crenshaw played all twelve players at least once during the first two days, even though Mark O'Meara only played once.

James published a best selling book about the event called Into the Bear Pit in 2000. In addition to criticising the behaviour of the Americans at Brookline, it also detailed James' clashes with some of his fellow Europeans including Faldo, the fading superstar whose merits as a potential captain's pick for the Ryder Cup had been much debated in the UK. James revealed in his book that just before the Ryder Cup began he had thrown a letter of encouragement from Faldo into the bin rather than share it with team. The controversy that this revelation aroused led to James resigning as one of Europe's Ryder Cup vice-captains for 2001.

A follow-up book, called After the Bear Pit, covering James' cancer and his experiences as a European Tour player, as well as further thoughts on the Ryder Cup, appeared in 2002.

=== Senior Tour and other commitments ===
James qualified to play senior golf when he turned fifty in late 2003. He chose to play mainly in the U.S. and was second in the Champions Tour Qualifying Tournament Finals that November. In 2004 he became the first European player to win one of the Champions Tour's senior majors with victory at the Ford Senior Players Championship. In 2005, he won on the Champions Tour for a second time at the ACE Group Classic and finished in the top 20 on the money list for a second consecutive season. His last full season on the Champions Tour was 2010 and he has played mainly on the European Senior Tour since then.

James has also worked as a golf commentator for the BBC.

== Professional wins (32) ==
=== European Tour wins (18) ===
No.	Date	Tournament	Winning score	Margin of victory	Runner(s)-up
1	1 Jul 1978	Sun Alliance Match Play Championship	3 and 2		(England) Neil Coles
2	17 Jun 1979	Welsh Golf Classic	−6 (72-68-68-70=278)	Playoff	(Scotland) Mike Miller, (Northern Ireland) Eddie Polland
3	26 Aug 1979	Carroll's Irish Open	−6 (73-75-69-65=282)	1 stroke	(United States) Ed Sneed
4	17 Aug 1980	Carroll's Irish Open (2)	−4 (71-66-74-73=284)	1 stroke	(Scotland) Brian Barnes
5	2 May 1982	Italian Open	−8 (70-67-71-72=280)	3 strokes	(United States) Bobby Clampett, (Wales) Ian Woosnam
6	17 Apr 1983	Tunisian Open	−4 (74-69-69-72=284)	2 strokes	(England) Gordon J. Brand, (Scotland) Gordon Brand Jnr, (United States) Tom Sieckmann
7	19 May 1985	GSI L'Equipe Open	−16 (68-67-71-66=272)	3 strokes	(England) Carl Mason
8	17 Aug 1986	Benson & Hedges International Open	−14 (65-70-69-70=274)	Playoff	(South Africa) Hugh Baiocchi, (United States) Lee Trevino
9	15 May 1988	Peugeot Spanish Open	−18 (63-68-63-68=262)	3 strokes	(England) Nick Faldo
10	5 Mar 1989	Karl Litten Desert Classic	−11 (69-68-72-68=277)	Playoff	(Australia) Peter O'Malley
11	27 Mar 1989	AGF Open	−11 (69-67-69-72=277)	3 strokes	(Wales) Mark Mouland
12	18 Jun 1989	NM English Open	−9 (72-70-69-68=279)	1 stroke	(Republic of Ireland) Eamonn Darcy, (Australia) Craig Parry, (Scotland) Sam Torrance
13	3 Jun 1990	Dunhill British Masters	−18 (70-67-66-67=270)	2 strokes	(Northern Ireland) David Feherty
14	19 Aug 1990	NM English Open (2)	−4 (76-68-65-75=284)	Playoff	(Scotland) Sam Torrance
15	17 Jan 1993	Madeira Island Open	−7 (71-69-70-71=281)	3 strokes	(England) Gordon J. Brand, (England) Paul Broadhurst
16	14 Feb 1993	Turespaña Iberia Open de Canarias	−13 (71-69-69-66=275)	6 strokes	(South Africa) De Wet Basson
17	12 Mar 1995	Moroccan Open	−13 (70-70-70-65=275)	1 stroke	(England) David Gilford
18	27 Apr 1997	Peugeot Open de España (2)	−11 (67-68-73-69=277)	Playoff	(Australia) Greg Norman

European Tour playoff record (5–4)

No.	Year	Tournament	Opponent(s)	Result
1	1979	Welsh Golf Classic	(Scotland) Mike Miller, (Northern Ireland) Eddie Polland	Won with par on third extra hole Polland eliminated by birdie on second hole
2	1984	St. Mellion Timeshare TPC	(Brazil) Jaime Gonzalez	Lost to par on second extra hole
3	1985	Trophée Lancôme	(Zimbabwe) Nick Price	Lost to par on third extra hole
4	1986	Benson & Hedges International Open	(South Africa) Hugh Baiocchi, (United States) Lee Trevino	Won with birdie on first extra hole
5	1989	Karl Litten Desert Classic	(Australia) Peter O'Malley	Won with birdie on first extra hole
6	1989	German Open	(Australia) Craig Parry	Lost to par on second extra hole
7	1990	NM English Open	(Scotland) Sam Torrance	Won with birdie on first extra hole
8	1992	BMW International Open	(United States) Paul Azinger, (United States) Glen Day, (Sweden) Anders Forsbrand, (Germany) Bernhard Langer	Azinger won with birdie on first extra hole
9	1997	Peugeot Open de España	(Australia) Greg Norman	Won with par on third extra hole

=== Southern Africa Tour wins (1) ===
No.	Date	Tournament	Winning score	Margin of victory	Runner-up
1	20 Feb 1988	Danglo Tournament Players Championship	−14 (66-70-69-69=274)	2 strokes	(South Africa) Hugh Baiocchi

Southern Africa Tour playoff record (0–1)

No.	Year	Tournament	Opponents	Result
1	1991	Lexington PGA Championship	(United States) Hugh Royer III, (South Africa) Roger Wessels	Wessels won par with on second extra hole Royer eliminated by par on first hole

=== Safari Circuit wins (1) ===
No.	Date	Tournament	Winning score	Margin of victory	Runner-up
1	20 Mar 1977	Lusaka Open	−13 (70-74-68-67=279)	1 stroke	(England) Gary Cullen

=== Other wins (5) ===
- 1980 Euro Masters Invitational (Italy – not a European Tour event)
- 1981 Heublein Open (Brazil)
- 1982 Hennessy Cognac Cup Individual
- 1983 Euro Masters Invitational (Italy – not a European Tour event)
- 2011 Gary Player Invitational (with George Coetzee)

=== Champions Tour wins (3) ===
Legend
Champions Tour major championships (1)
Other Champions Tour (2)

No.	Date	Tournament	Winning score	Margin of victory	Runner(s)-up
1	11 Jul 2004	Ford Senior Players Championship	−13 (68-67-67-73=275)	1 stroke	(Spain) José María Cañizares
2	20 Feb 2005	ACE Group Classic	−13 (69-68-66=203)	2 strokes	(United States) Hale Irwin, (United States) Tom Wargo
3	11 Feb 2007	Allianz Championship	−15 (64-69-68=201)	2 strokes	(United States) Jay Haas

=== European Senior Tour wins (2) ===
No.	Date	Tournament	Winning score	Margin of victory	Runner-up
1	4 Sep 2005	Bovis Lend Lease European Senior Masters	−9 (70-71-66=207)	Playoff	(Scotland) Sam Torrance
2	10 May 2009	Son Gual Mallorca Senior Open	−10 (70-70-66=206)	Playoff	(Republic of Ireland) Eamonn Darcy

European Senior Tour playoff record (2–0)

No.	Year	Tournament	Opponent	Result
1	2005	Bovis Lend Lease European Senior Masters	(Scotland) Sam Torrance	Won with birdie on first extra hole
2	2009	Son Gual Mallorca Senior Open	(Republic of Ireland) Eamonn Darcy	Won with birdie on third extra hole

=== Other senior wins (2) ===
- 2011 Liberty Mutual Legends of Golf - Raphael Division (with Des Smyth)
- 2012 Liberty Mutual Legends of Golf - Raphael Division (with Des Smyth)

== Results in major championships ==
Tournament	1973	1974	1975	1976	1977	1978	1979
Masters Tournament							
U.S. Open							
The Open Championship	CUT	CUT		T5	CUT	CUT	4
PGA Championship							

Tournament	1980	1981	1982	1983	1984	1985	1986	1987	1988	1989
Masters Tournament	CUT									
U.S. Open										
The Open Championship	T45	T3	T51	T29	T44	T20	T35	CUT	T62	T13
PGA Championship										

Tournament	1990	1991	1992	1993	1994	1995	1996	1997	1998	1999	2000
Masters Tournament											
U.S. Open	CUT						CUT				
The Open Championship	T31	T26	CUT	T27	T4	T8	T22	T20	T19	T43	CUT
PGA Championship	CUT		T40	CUT	CUT		CUT			T31	

Top 10
Did not play

CUT = missed the half-way cut (3rd round cut in 1974, 1977 and 1978 Open Championships)
"T" indicates a tie for a place

=== Summary ===
Tournament	Wins	2nd	3rd	Top-5	Top-10	Top-25	Events	Cuts made
Masters Tournament	0	0	0	0	0	0	1	0
U.S. Open	0	0	0	0	0	0	2	0
The Open Championship	0	0	1	4	5	10	26	20
PGA Championship	0	0	0	0	0	0	6	2
Totals	0	0	1	4	5	10	35	22

- Most consecutive cuts made – 7 (1980 Open Championship – 1986 Open Championship)
- Longest streak of top-10s – 1 (five times)

== Results in World Golf Championships ==
Tournament	1999
Match Play	
Championship	T25
Invitational	

Did not play

"T" = Tied

== Senior major championships ==
=== Wins (1) ===
Year	Championship	Winning score	Margin	Runner-up
2004	Ford Senior Players Championship	−13 (68-67-67-73=275)	1 stroke	(Spain) José María Cañizares

=== Results timeline ===
Results not in chronological order before 2021.

Tournament	2004	2005	2006	2007	2008	2009	2010	2011	2012	2013	2014	2015	2016	2017	2018	2019	2020	2021
The Tradition	T19	4	T4			T41	T50										NT	
Senior PGA Championship	T4	T10	CUT	T33	T62	T9	T56	CUT	T56	CUT							NT	
Senior Players Championship	1	T49	T11			T22	T11											
U.S. Senior Open	T15	T54	T14	T47	T29												NT	
Senior British Open Championship	4	T12	T15	T61	T16	T43	T20	T72	T53	47	CUT	CUT			CUT	CUT	NT	CUT

Win
Top 10
Did not play

CUT = missed the halfway cut
"T" indicates a tie for a place
NT = No tournament due to COVID-19 pandemic

== Team appearances ==
Amateur

- Walker Cup (representing Great Britain & Ireland): 1975
- European Amateur Team Championship (representing England): 1975

Professional

- Hennessy Cognac Cup (representing Great Britain and Ireland): 1976 (winners), 1978 (winners), 1980 (winners), 1982 (winners & individual winner), (representing England) 1984 (winners)
- Ryder Cup (representing Great Britain and Ireland/Europe): 1977, 1979, 1981, 1989 (tied and retained cup), 1991, 1993, 1995 (winners), 1999 (non-playing captain)
- World Cup (representing England): 1978, 1979, 1982, 1984, 1987, 1988, 1990, 1993, 1997, 1999
- Alfred Dunhill Cup (representing England): 1988, 1989, 1990, 1993, 1995, 1997, 1999
- Four Tours World Championship (representing Europe): 1988, 1989, 1990

== See also ==
- List of golfers with most European Tour wins
