= Heineken Open =

Heineken Open may refer to:

- Heineken Open (tennis), a men's tennis tournament in Auckland, New Zealand
- Heineken Open (golf), a golf tournament (now known as the Catalan Open)
