= Fred Wadsworth =

American professional golfer (born 1962)

Personal information
- Full name: Frederick Willi Wadsworth
- Nationality: United States
- Born: July 17, 1962 (age 64) Munich, Germany
- Height: 6 ft 3 in (1.91 m)
- Weight: 170 lb (77 kg; 12 st)

Career
- Sport: Golf
- College: University of South Carolina
- Turned professional: 1984
- Former tours: PGA Tour; Southern Africa Tour
- Professional wins: 2

Number of wins by tour
- PGA Tour: 1
- Sunshine Tour: 1

Best results in major championships
- Masters Tournament: CUT: 1987
- PGA Championship: CUT: 1987
- U.S. Open: T75: 1987
- The Open Championship: DNP

Frederick Willi Wadsworth (born July 17, 1962) is an American professional golfer. He played on the PGA Tour and the Southern Africa Tour. He won the 1986 Southern Open on the PGA Tour and the 1989 South African Open.

== Early life ==
Wadsworth was born in Munich, Germany and grew up in Columbia, South Carolina. He attended the University of South Carolina.

== Professional career ==
Wadsworth turned professional in 1984. He was a Monday qualifier who won a PGA Tour event, seven months after Kenny Knox did the same to win the Honda Classic. His victory came at the 1986 Southern Open when he shot a final round 67 to finish at 11-under-par 269 to win by two strokes over four other golfers. The victory gave Wadsworth a two-year exemption. He played poorly in the 1987 and 1988 seasons producing only one top-10 in 66 events.

Failing to maintain his PGA Tour card, Wadsworth played on the South African Tour in 1989. He won the tour's most prestigious event, the South African Open, defeating fellow American and future star Tom Lehman. In the 1990s, he played primarily on the Ben Hogan Tour in an effort to get back on the PGA Tour. He did not do very well, recording only two top-10s despite playing in over 100 events.

== Personal life ==
Wadsworth lives in Columbia, South Carolina.

== Amateur wins ==
- 1984 Eastern Amateur

== Professional wins (2) ==
=== PGA Tour wins (1) ===
| No. | Date | Tournament | Winning score | Margin of victory | Runners-up |
|---|---|---|---|---|---|
| 1 | Sep 14, 1986 | Southern Open | −11 (67-67-68-67=269) | 2 strokes | (United States) George Archer, (United States) John Cook, (United States) Tim Simpson, (United States) Jim Thorpe |

=== Southern Africa Tour wins (1) ===
| No. | Date | Tournament | Winning score | Margin of victory | Runner-up |
|---|---|---|---|---|---|
| 1 | Feb 4, 1989 | Protea Assurance South African Open | −10 (72-68-70-68=278) | 1 stroke | (United States) Tom Lehman |

== Results in major championships ==
| Tournament | 1985 | 1986 | 1987 |
|---|---|---|---|
| Masters Tournament | | | CUT |
| U.S. Open | CUT | CUT | T75 |
| PGA Championship | | | CUT |

Note: Wadsworth never played in The Open Championship.

Did not play

CUT = missed the half-way cut
"T" = tied

== See also ==
- 2000 PGA Tour Qualifying School graduates
