= Turespaña Open De Canaria =

Coordinates: 28.114°N 16.748°W

Tenerife Open
Tournament information
- Location: Tenerife, Spain
- Established: 1989
- Course: Golf Costa Adeje
- Par: 71
- Length: 6,857 yd (6,270 m)
- Tour: European Tour
- Format: Stroke play
- Prize fund: €1,500,000
- Month played: April/May
- Final year: 2021

Tournament record score
- Aggregate: 259 Dean Burmester (2021)
- To par: −25 as above

Final champion
- (South Africa) Dean Burmester
- Location in the Canary Islands Location in Tenerife

The Tenerife Open was a professional golf tournament on the European Tour. Formerly known as the Turespaña Open De Canaria when the tournament was last held in 1995. In 2021, the tournament was revived into the European Tour schedule. It is played in the Canary Islands of Spain, usually in Tenerife. Turespaña is the Spanish national tourism body, and it sponsored several golf tournaments in the 1980s and 1990s to promote Spain's role as a leading warm weather golf holiday destination in Europe. The most notable winner was Spaniard José María Olazábal, who later went on to win two Masters.

== Winners ==
Year	Winner	Score	To par	Margin of victory	Runner(s)-up	Venue
Tenerife Open
2021	(South Africa) Dean Burmester	259	−25	5 strokes	(Germany) Nicolai von Dellingshausen	Golf Costa Adeje (Tenerife)
1996–2020: No tournament
Turespaña Open De Canaria
1995	(Sweden) Jarmo Sandelin	282	−6	1 stroke	(Spain) Seve Ballesteros (England) Paul Eales	Campo de Golf da Maspalomas (Gran Canaria)
Turespaña Open De Tenerife
1994	(England) David Gilford	278	−10	2 strokes	(England) Andrew Murray (Spain) Juan Quirós (Australia) Wayne Riley	Golf del Sur (Tenerife)
Turespaña Iberia Open de Canarias
1993	(England) Mark James	275	−13	6 strokes	(South Africa) De Wet Basson	Golf del Sur (Tenerife)
Turespaña Open de Tenerife
1992	(Spain) José María Olazábal (2)	273	−15	5 strokes	(Spain) Miguel Ángel Martín	Golf del Sur (Tenerife)
Tenerife Open
1991: No tournament
1990	(Argentina) Vicente Fernández	282	−6	Playoff	(Wales) Mark Mouland	Amarilla G&CC (Tenerife)
1989	(Spain) José María Olazábal	275	−13	3 strokes	(Spain) José María Cañizares (England) David Gilford	Golf del Sur (Tenerife)
