= 1992 European Tour =

Golf tour season

1992 European Tour season
- Duration: 30 January 1992 – 1 November 1992
- Number of official events: 38
- Most wins: (England) Nick Faldo (4)
- Order of Merit: (England) Nick Faldo
- Golfer of the Year: (England) Nick Faldo
- Sir Henry Cotton Rookie of the Year: (England) Jim Payne

The 1992 European Tour, titled as the 1992 Volvo Tour for sponsorship reasons, was the 21st season of the European Tour, the main professional golf tour in Europe since its inaugural season in 1972.

It was the fifth season of the tour under a title sponsorship agreement with Volvo, that was announced in May 1987.

== Changes for 1992 ==
The European Tour ventured to East Asia for the first time, with the addition of the Johnnie Walker Asian Classic in Thailand to the tour schedule.

The season was made up of 38 tournaments counting for the Order of Merit, and five non-counting "Approved Special Events".

Other changes from the previous season included the return of the Dubai Desert Classic, the Tenerife Open and the Moroccan Open; the addition of the Johnnie Walker Asian Classic, the Turespaña Masters Open de Andalucía, the Roma Masters, the Lyon Open V33 and the Honda Open; and the loss of the Girona Open, the Murphy's Cup, the European Pro-Celebrity and the Epson Grand Prix of Europe.

== Schedule ==
The following table lists official events during the 1992 season.

Date	Tournament	Host country	Purse (£)	Winner (Note: The number in brackets after each winner's name is the number of European Tour events they had won up to and including that tournament. This information is only shown for European Tour members and are inclusive of the three United States-based major championships which were included on the schedule for the first time in 1998, with earlier editions having retrospectively been recognised as official tour wins.)	OWGR points	Notes
2 Feb	Johnnie Walker Asian Classic	Thailand	500,000	(South Africa) Ian Palmer (1)	48	New to European Tour
9 Feb	Dubai Desert Classic	UAE	US$650,000	(Spain) Seve Ballesteros (46)	42	
16 Feb	Turespaña Masters Open de Andalucía	Spain	300,000	(Fiji) Vijay Singh (3)	36	New tournament
23 Feb	Turespaña Open de Tenerife	Spain	300,000	(Spain) José María Olazábal (12)	24	
1 Mar	Open Mediterrania	Spain	400,000	(Spain) José María Olazábal (13)	38	
8 Mar	Turespaña Open de Baleares	Spain	250,000	(Spain) Seve Ballesteros (47)	26	
14 Mar	Catalan Open	Spain	300,000	(Spain) José Rivero (4)	24	
22 Mar	Portuguese Open	Portugal	225,000	(Northern Ireland) Ronan Rafferty (6)	20	
29 Mar	Volvo Open di Firenze	Italy	225,000	(Sweden) Anders Forsbrand (3)	20	
5 Apr	Roma Masters	Italy	225,000	(Spain) José María Cañizares (5)	20	New tournament
12 Apr	Jersey European Airways Open	Jersey	225,000	(Portugal) Daniel Silva (1)	20	
12 Apr	Masters Tournament	United States	US$1,500,000	(United States) Fred Couples (n/a)	100	Major championship (Note: Unofficial money event at the time, but retrospectively counted as an official win.)
19 Apr	Moroccan Open	Morocco	250,000	(England) David Gilford (2)	24	
26 Apr	Credit Lyonnais Cannes Open	France	350,000	(Sweden) Anders Forsbrand (4)	32	
3 May	Lancia Martini Italian Open	Italy	375,000	(Scotland) Sandy Lyle (17)	38	
10 May	Benson & Hedges International Open	England	500,000	(Australia) Peter Senior (4)	46	
17 May	Peugeot Spanish Open	Spain	400,000	(England) Andrew Sherborne (2)	44	
25 May	Volvo PGA Championship	England	600,000	(Zimbabwe) Tony Johnstone (4)	64	Flagship event
31 May	Dunhill British Masters	England	600,000	(Republic of Ireland) Christy O'Connor Jnr (4)	52	
7 Jun	Carroll's Irish Open	Ireland	450,000	(England) Nick Faldo (23)	44	
14 Jun	Mitsubishi Austrian Open	Austria	350,000	(England) Peter Mitchell (1)	20	
21 Jun	Lyon Open V33	France	225,000	(England) David J. Russell (2)	20	New tournament
21 Jun	U.S. Open	United States	US$1,500,000	(United States) Tom Kite (n/a)	100	Major championship
28 Jun	Peugeot Open de France	France	400,000	(Spain) Miguel Ángel Martín (1)	38	
4 Jul	The European Newspaper Monte Carlo Open	France	450,000	(Wales) Ian Woosnam (20)	38	
11 Jul	Bell's Scottish Open	Scotland	600,000	(Australia) Peter O'Malley (1)	54	
19 Jul	The Open Championship	Scotland	1,000,000	(England) Nick Faldo (24)	100	Major championship
26 Jul	Heineken Dutch Open	Netherlands	600,000	(Germany) Bernhard Langer (26)	46	
2 Aug	Scandinavian Masters	Sweden	600,000	(England) Nick Faldo (25)	46	
9 Aug	BMW International Open	Germany	500,000	(United States) Paul Azinger (n/a)	42	
16 Aug	PGA Championship	United States	US$1,600,000	(Zimbabwe) Nick Price (3)	100	Major championship
23 Aug	Volvo German Open	Germany	525,000	(Fiji) Vijay Singh (4)	38	
31 Aug	Murphy's English Open	England	550,000	(Argentina) Vicente Fernández (4)	26	
6 Sep	Canon European Masters	Switzerland	575,000	(England) Jamie Spence (1)	40	
13 Sep	GA European Open	England	600,000	(England) Nick Faldo (26)	46	
20 Sep	Trophée Lancôme	France	475,000	(England) Mark Roe (2)	50	Limited-field event
27 Sep	Piaget Belgian Open	Belgium	600,000	(Spain) Miguel Ángel Jiménez (1)	48	
4 Oct	Mercedes German Masters	Germany	600,000	(England) Barry Lane (2)	50	
11 Oct	Honda Open	Germany	450,000	(Germany) Bernhard Langer (27)	36	New tournament
25 Oct	Iberia Madrid Open	Spain	400,000	(Northern Ireland) David Feherty (5)	30	
1 Nov	Volvo Masters	Spain	650,000	(Scotland) Sandy Lyle (18)	50	Tour Championship

=== Unofficial events ===
The following events were sanctioned by the European Tour, but did not carry official money, nor were wins official.

Date	Tournament	Host country	Purse (£)	Winner(s)	OWGR points	Notes
15 Sep	Equity & Law Challenge	England	150,000	(Sweden) Anders Forsbrand	n/a	
11 Oct	Toyota World Match Play Championship	England	550,000	(England) Nick Faldo	48	Limited-field event
18 Oct	Dunhill Cup	Scotland	US$1,700,000	Team England	n/a	Team event
8 Nov	World Cup	Italy	US$1,100,000	(United States) Fred Couples and (United States) Davis Love III	n/a	Team event
8 Nov	World Cup Individual Trophy	Italy	US$1,100,000	(Australia) Brett Ogle	n/a	
20 Dec	Johnnie Walker World Golf Championship	Jamaica	US$2,700,000	(England) Nick Faldo	62	Limited-field event

== Order of Merit ==
The Order of Merit was titled as the Volvo Order of Merit and was based on prize money won during the season, calculated in Pound sterling.

Position	Player	Prize money (£)
1	(England) Nick Faldo	708,522
2	(Germany) Bernhard Langer	488,913
3	(Scotland) Colin Montgomerie	444,713
4	(Sweden) Anders Forsbrand	417,471
5	(England) Barry Lane	394,252
6	(Spain) José María Olazábal	385,627
7	(Zimbabwe) Tony Johnstone	340,917
8	(Scotland) Sandy Lyle	333,141
9	(Fiji) Vijay Singh	293,737
10	(England) Jamie Spence	287,957

== Awards ==
Award	Winner	Ref.
Golfer of the Year	(England) Nick Faldo	
Sir Henry Cotton Rookie of the Year	(England) Jim Payne	

== See also ==
- 1992 Challenge Tour
- 1992 European Seniors Tour
