= Catalan Open =

Tournament information
- Location: Catalonia, Spain
- Established: 1989
- Course: Club de Golf Bonmont
- Par: 72
- Tour: European Tour
- Format: Stroke play
- Prize fund: £300,000
- Month played: March
- Final year: 1996

Tournament record score
- Aggregate: 271 José María Olazábal (1991)
- To par: −17 as above

Final champion
- (Scotland) Paul Lawrie
- Location in Spain Location in Catalonia

The Catalan Open was a European Tour golf tournament which was played annually from 1989 to 1996, except for 1990. It was played at several different golf courses in Catalonia, Spain. It never had the same full official name two years in a row, due to sponsorship and preferred language changes. The winners included future two-time Masters champion José María Olazábal. The prize fund was £200,000 in 1989 and £300,000 in all other years (plus the usual minor increments to the guaranteed amount for additional players who made the cut). By the final year this was the second smallest purse on the tour.

== Winners ==
Year	Winner	Score	To par	Margin of victory	Runner(s)-up	Venue
Catalan Open
1996	(Scotland) Paul Lawrie	135 (Note: Tournament reduced to 36 holes due to bad weather.)	−9	1 stroke	(Spain) Fernando Roca	Bonmont
Open Catalonia
1995	(Republic of Ireland) Philip Walton	281	−7	3 strokes	(Scotland) Andrew Coltart	Peralada
Heineken Open Catalonia
1994	(Argentina) José Cóceres	275	−13	3 strokes	(France) Jean-Louis Guépy	Pals
Heineken Open
1993	(Scotland) Sam Torrance	201 (Note: Tournament reduced to 54 holes.)	−15	3 strokes	(United States) Jay Townsend	Osona Montanya
Catalan Open
1992	(Spain) José Rivero	280	−8	1 stroke	(Spain) José María Cañizares (Sweden) Johan Ryström (England) Haydn Selby-Green	Mas Nou
Open Catalonia
1991	(Spain) José María Olazábal	271	−17	6 strokes	(Northern Ireland) David Feherty	Bonmont Terres Noves
Catalan Open
1990	Cancelled due to lack of sponsorship					
Massimo Dutti Catalan Open
1989	(England) Mark Roe	279	−13	1 stroke	(Scotland) Gordon Brand Jnr (Scotland) Colin Montgomerie (Spain) José María Olazábal	Pals
