= Jamie Spence =

English golfer (born 1963)

Personal information
- Full name: James Stephen Spence
- Nationality: England
- Born: 26 May 1963 (age 63) Royal Tunbridge Wells, Kent, England
- Height: 1.73 m (5 ft 8 in)
- Weight: 76 kg (168 lb; 12.0 st)

Career
- Sport: Golf
- Turned professional: 1985
- Current tours: European Seniors Tour; Champions Tour
- Former tour: European Tour
- Professional wins: 3
- Highest ranking: 57 (6 September 1992)

Number of wins by tour
- European Tour: 2
- Challenge Tour: 1

Best results in major championships
- Masters Tournament: DNP
- PGA Championship: DNP
- U.S. Open: DNP
- The Open Championship: T12: 1992

James Stephen Spence (born 26 May 1963) is an English professional golfer.

== Career ==
Spence was born in Royal Tunbridge Wells, Kent. He turned professional in 1985 and has finished in the top 100 on the European Tour Order of Merit more than a dozen times, with a best placing of tenth in 1992. His two European Tour wins came at the 1992 Canon European Masters and the 2000 Moroccan Open.

In 2003 he succeeded Mark James as the Chairman of The European Tour's Tournament Committee.

Spence also appeared on the Sky TV scientific programme Brainiac: Science Abuse where he took part in "Brainiac Golf", in which a Brainiac went head to head against Spence. Every time a ball was putted it set off a fuse which ignited a caravan filled with a unique chemical compound, e.g. lead nitrate, which coloured the explosive flame.

Spence also has a radio show named in his honour, 'The Jamie Spence Show' on Bolton FM.

== Professional wins (3) ==
=== European Tour wins (2) ===
No.	Date	Tournament	Winning score	Margin of victory	Runner(s)-up
1	6 Sep 1992	Canon European Masters	−17 (67-71-73-60=271)	Playoff	(Sweden) Anders Forsbrand
2	23 Apr 2000	Moroccan Open Méditel	−22 (66-68-68-64=266)	4 strokes	(France) Sébastien Delagrange, (France) Thomas Levet, (England) Ian Poulter

European Tour playoff record (1–0)

No.	Year	Tournament	Opponent	Result
1	1992	Canon European Masters	(Sweden) Anders Forsbrand	Won with birdie on second extra hole

=== Challenge Tour wins (1) ===
- 1989 Open della Pinetina

== Results in major championships ==
Tournament	1990	1991	1992	1993	1994	1995	1996	1997	1998	1999	2000	2001	2002
The Open Championship	T22	T44	T12	T63		CUT		T62			CUT		CUT

Note: Spence only played in The Open Championship.

Did not play

CUT = missed the half-way cut
"T" = tied

== Team appearances ==
Professional

- Alfred Dunhill Cup (representing England): 1992 (winners), 2000
- World Cup (representing England): 2000

== See also ==
- List of people from Royal Tunbridge Wells
