= Feherty (TV program) =

American television program broadcast by Golf Channel

- Starring: David Feherty
- Country of origin: United States

Production
- Running time: 60 minutes

Original release
- Network: Golf Channel
- Release: June 21, 2011 – October 31, 2020

Feherty is an American talk show that was broadcast by Golf Channel from 2011 to 2020. It was hosted by retired professional golfer and television analyst David Feherty, and featured one-on-one interviews between him and other notable figures in golf.

It premiered on June 21, 2011, with an episode featuring an interview with Lee Trevino. Golf Channel's coverage of the 2011 U.S. Open was used to bolster the impending premiere. It was the most-watched original premiere in Golf Channel history.

In January 2015, Feherty broadcast live episodes from the Orpheum Theatre in Phoenix, Arizona, as cross-promotion for NBC's telecast of Super Bowl XLIX in nearby Glendale.

Feherty was renewed in September 2015, as part of a larger five-year deal that saw Feherty leave CBS to join NBC Sports and Golf Channel.

The tenth season premiered on February 24, 2020. The show was cancelled in January 2021 after its tenth season.

Feherty was executive produced and directed by Keith Allo, and produced by a team that included Dean Butler, Ryan Griffiths, Jason Harper, and James Ponti.

== Reception ==
Feherty received positive reviews from critics. Scott Michaux of The Augusta Chronicle commented that the show "has all the ingredients to be a breakout hit", and praised its premiere episode featuring Lee Trevino for being "a poignant self-confession of Feherty's own sins [with] enough little bits and pieces of humor to keep the whole thing rollicking."
