= Mallorca Open Senior =

Tournament information
- Location: Son Servera, Mallorca, Spain
- Established: 2009
- Course: Pula Golf Club
- Par: 71
- Length: 6,746 yards (6,169 m)
- Tour: European Senior Tour
- Format: Stroke play
- Prize fund: €200,000
- Month played: May
- Final year: 2012

Tournament record score
- Aggregate: 205 Gary Wolstenholme (2012)
- To par: −10 Mark James (2009)

Final champion
- (England) Gary Wolstenholme
- Location in Spain Location in Mallorca

The Mallorca Open Senior was a men's golf tournament on the European Senior Tour. In 2009 the tournament was called the Son Gual Mallorca Senior Open and was held at Son Gual Golf, Palma, Mallorca while in 2012 it was played at Pula Golf, Son Servera, Mallorca, Spain. In 2012 the prize fund was €200,000.

== Winners ==
Year	Winner	Score	To par	Margin of victory	Runner(s)-up	Venue
Mallorca Open Senior
2012	(England) Gary Wolstenholme	205	−8	2 strokes	(Australia) Mike Harwood (England) Paul Wesselingh (South Africa) Chris Williams	Pula
2010–11: No tournament
Son Gual Mallorca Senior Open
2009	(England) Mark James	206	−10	Playoff	(Republic of Ireland) Eamonn Darcy	Son Gual
