= 1989 European Tour =

Golf tour season

1989 European Tour season
- Duration: 23 February 1989 – 29 October 1989
- Number of official events: 33 (Note: One further tournament was scheduled but was cancelled.)
- Most wins: (England) Nick Faldo (4)
- Order of Merit: (Northern Ireland) Ronan Rafferty
- Golfer of the Year: (England) Nick Faldo
- Sir Henry Cotton Rookie of the Year: (England) Paul Broadhurst

The 1989 European Tour, titled as the 1989 Volvo Tour for sponsorship reasons, was the 18th season of the European Tour, the main professional golf tour in Europe since its inaugural season in 1972.

It was the second season of the tour under a title sponsorship agreement with Volvo, that was announced in May 1987.

== Changes for 1989 ==
The season was made up of 33 tournaments counting for the Order of Merit, and ten non-counting "Approved Special Events".

There were several changes from the previous season, with the addition of the Tenerife Open, the Dubai Desert Classic, the Volvo Open Championship, the Murphy's Cup (an approved special event), the BMW International Open and the Catalan Open, which replaced the cancelled Barcelona Open. A renewal of the Europcar Cup, a team event which debuted in 1988, was planned but was ultimately cancelled.

== Schedule ==
The following table lists official events during the 1989 season.

Date	Tournament	Host country	Purse (£)	Winner (Note: The number in brackets after each winner's name is the number of European Tour events they had won up to and including that tournament. This information is only shown for European Tour members and are inclusive of the three United States-based major championships which were included on the schedule for the first time in 1998, with earlier editions having retrospectively been recognised as official tour wins.)	OWGR points	Notes
26 Feb	Tenerife Open	Spain	200,000	(Spain) José María Olazábal (5)	18	New tournament
5 Mar	Karl Litten Desert Classic	UAE	US$450,000	(England) Mark James (10)	18	New tournament
13 Mar	Open Renault de Baleares	Spain	225,000	(Sweden) Ove Sellberg (2)	26	
~~19 Mar~~	Barcelona Open	Spain	–	Cancelled	–	
19 Mar	Massimo Dutti Catalan Open	Spain	200,000	(England) Mark Roe (1)	18	New tournament
27 Mar	AGF Open	France	150,000	(England) Mark James (11)	16	
2 Apr	Volvo Open Championship	Italy	200,000	(Fiji) Vijay Singh (1)	16	New tournament
9 Apr	Jersey European Airways Open	Jersey	150,000	(Republic of Ireland) Christy O'Connor Jnr (3)	16	
9 Apr	Masters Tournament	United States	US$1,000,000	(England) Nick Faldo (16)	100	Major championship (Note: Unofficial money event at the time, but retrospectively counted as an official win.)
16 Apr	Credit Lyonnais Cannes Open	France	200,000	(England) Paul Broadhurst (1)	14	
23 Apr	Cepsa Madrid Open	Spain	225,000	(Spain) Seve Ballesteros (40)	26	
30 Apr	Peugeot Spanish Open	Spain	250,000	(West Germany) Bernhard Langer (20)	40	
7 May	Epson Grand Prix of Europe Matchplay Championship	Wales	300,000	(Spain) Seve Ballesteros (41)	40	Limited-field event
14 May	Volvo Belgian Open	Belgium	200,000	(England) Gordon J. Brand (1)	18	
21 May	Lancia Italian Open	Italy	225,000	(Northern Ireland) Ronan Rafferty (1)	36	
30 May	Volvo PGA Championship	England	350,000	(England) Nick Faldo (17)	64	
4 Jun	Dunhill British Masters	England	300,000	(England) Nick Faldo (18)	42	
11 Jun	Wang Four Stars	England	200,000	(Australia) Craig Parry (1)	18	Pro-Am
18 Jun	NM English Open	England	250,000	(England) Mark James (12)	16	
18 Jun	U.S. Open	United States	US$1,000,000	(United States) Curtis Strange (n/a)	100	Major championship
25 Jun	Carroll's Irish Open	Ireland	250,000	(Wales) Ian Woosnam (12)	38	
2 Jul	Peugeot Open de France	France	325,000	(England) Nick Faldo (19)	46	
8 Jul	Torras Monte Carlo Open	France	300,000	(Zimbabwe) Mark McNulty (8)	24	
15 Jul	Bell's Scottish Open	Scotland	300,000	(United States) Michael Allen (1)	46	
23 Jul	The Open Championship	Scotland	725,000	(United States) Mark Calcavecchia (n/a)	100	Major championship
30 Jul	KLM Dutch Open	Netherlands	275,000	(Spain) José María Olazábal (6)	40	
6 Aug	Scandinavian Enterprise Open	Sweden	325,000	(Northern Ireland) Ronan Rafferty (2)	32	
13 Aug	Benson & Hedges International Open	England	300,000	(Scotland) Gordon Brand Jnr (7)	34	
13 Aug	PGA Championship	United States	US$1,200,000	(United States) Payne Stewart (n/a)	100	Major championship
20 Aug	PLM Open	Sweden	300,000	(Australia) Mike Harwood (2)	24	
27 Aug	German Open	West Germany	325,000	(Australia) Craig Parry (2)	38	
3 Sep	Ebel European Masters Swiss Open	Switzerland	425,000	(Spain) Seve Ballesteros (42)	40	
10 Sep	Panasonic European Open	England	350,000	(England) Andrew Murray (1)	64	
17 Sep	Trophée Lancôme	France	400,000	(Argentina) Eduardo Romero (1)	64	Limited-field event
8 Oct	German Masters	West Germany	325,000	(West Germany) Bernhard Langer (21)	48	
15 Oct	BMW International Open	West Germany	275,000	(Northern Ireland) David Feherty (3)	22	New tournament
22 Oct	Portuguese Open TPC	Portugal	275,000	(Scotland) Colin Montgomerie (1)	18	
29 Oct	Volvo Masters	Spain	400,000	(Northern Ireland) Ronan Rafferty (3)	40	Tour Championship

=== Unofficial events ===
The following events were sanctioned by the European Tour, but did not carry official money, nor were wins official.

Date	Tournament	Host country	Purse (£)	Winner(s)	OWGR points	Notes
19 Aug	Murphy's Cup	Wales	160,000	(South Africa) Hugh Baiocchi	n/a	New tournament
24 Sep	Ryder Cup	England	n/a	Tie ( Team Europe retain)	n/a	Team event
26 Sep	Equity & Law Challenge	England	135,000	(Australia) Brett Ogle	n/a	
30 Sep	Motorola Classic	England	60,000	(Wales) David Llewellyn	4	
1 Oct	Dunhill Cup	Scotland	US$1,200,000	Team USA	n/a	Team event
1 Oct	UAP European Under-25 Championship	France	n/a	(Northern Ireland) Stephen Hamill	n/a	
15 Oct	Suntory World Match Play Championship	England	325,000	(England) Nick Faldo	36	Limited-field event
~~5 Nov~~	Europcar Cup	France	–	Cancelled	–	Team event
5 Nov	Asahi Glass Four Tours World Championship	Japan	US$1,030,000	Team USA	n/a	Team event
12 Nov	Benson & Hedges Trophy	Spain	200,000	(Spain) Miguel Ángel Jiménez and (Spain) Xonia Wunsch-Ruiz	n/a	Team event
19 Nov	World Cup	Spain	US$1,000,000	(Australia) Peter Fowler and (Australia) Wayne Grady	n/a	Team event
19 Nov	World Cup Individual Trophy	Spain	US$1,000,000	(Australia) Peter Fowler	n/a	

== Order of Merit ==
The Order of Merit was titled as the Volvo Order of Merit and was based on prize money won during the season, calculated in Pound sterling.

Position	Player	Prize money (£)
1	(Northern Ireland) Ronan Rafferty	400,311
2	(Spain) José María Olazábal	336,239
3	(Australia) Craig Parry	277,322
4	(England) Nick Faldo	261,553
5	(England) Mark James	245,917
6	(Wales) Ian Woosnam	210,101
7	(West Germany) Bernhard Langer	205,195
8	(Spain) Seve Ballesteros	202,763
9	(Zimbabwe) Mark McNulty	179,694
10	(Northern Ireland) David Feherty	178,167

== Awards ==
Award	Winner	Ref.
Golfer of the Year	(England) Nick Faldo	
Sir Henry Cotton Rookie of the Year	(England) Paul Broadhurst	

== See also ==
- 1989 Challenge Tour
