= 1988–89 Southern Africa Tour =

Golf tour season

1988–89 Southern Africa Tour season
- Duration: 7 November 1988 – 25 February 1989
- Number of official events: 12
- Most wins: (Zimbabwe) Tony Johnstone (3)
- Order of Merit: (Zimbabwe) Tony Johnstone

The 1988–89 Southern Africa Tour was the 18th season of the Southern Africa Tour, the main professional golf tour in South Africa since it was formed in 1971.

== Season outline ==
With three wins and three runner-up finishes in the opening seven tournaments, the first half of the season belonged to Tony Johnstone. At the first event, the Minolta Copiers Match Play, he defeated Wayne Westner by two in the stroke play final. Johnstone also won the following week at the Bloemfontein Classic. He then finished runner-up at the next two events, the Safmarine South African Masters and the Goodyear Classic. The fifth event, the Dewar's White Label Trophy, developed into a "two-man battle" between Johnstone and Bland; a birdie at the 72nd hole secured a one stroke victory for Bland. Despite his third runner-up finish in succession, Johnstone had established a big lead on the money list. Chris Williams won the sixth tournament, ICL International. However, the next week Johnstone won his third title of the season, defeating Williams in a playoff at the Lexington PGA Championship.

Americans dominated the remainder of the season. In late January, Stuart Smith won the Palabora Classic. The following week at the Protea Assurance South African Open, Tom Lehman led by four strokes entering the final round. However, fellow American Fred Wadsworth outplayed Lehman with a 68 on Sunday to win by one. The final event of the season, the Trustbank Tournament of Champions, was won by another American, Jay Townsend.

Zimbabwe's Tony Johnstone dominated the Order of Merit. During the twelve tournament season, he won three times, including the Lexington PGA Championship, had four runner-up finishes.

== Schedule ==
The following table lists official events during the 1988–89 season.

Date	Tournament	Location	Purse (R)	Winner (Note: The number in brackets after each winner's name is the number of Southern Africa Tour events they had won up to and including that tournament. This information is only shown for Southern Africa Tour members.)	OWGR points	Notes
13 Nov	Minolta Copiers Match Play	Transvaal	250,000	(Zimbabwe) Tony Johnstone (9)	8	
19 Nov	Bloemfontein Classic	Orange Free State	250,000	(Zimbabwe) Tony Johnstone (10)	8	
26 Nov	Safmarine South African Masters	Cape	250,000	(South Africa) John Bland (12)	8	
18 Dec	Goodyear Classic	Cape	250,000	(South West Africa) Trevor Dodds (1)	8	
7 Jan	Dewar's White Label Trophy	Natal	250,000	(South Africa) John Bland (13)	8	New tournament
14 Jan	ICL International	Transvaal	250,000	(South Africa) Chris Williams (2)	8	
21 Jan	Lexington PGA Championship	Transvaal	250,000	(Zimbabwe) Tony Johnstone (11)	8	
28 Jan	Palabora Classic	Transvaal	250,000	(United States) Stuart Smith (1)	8	
4 Feb	Protea Assurance South African Open	Transvaal	300,000	(United States) Fred Wadsworth (1)	16	
10 Feb	AECI Charity Classic	Transvaal	250,000	(South Africa) Jeff Hawkes (2)	6	
19 Feb	Hollard Royal Swazi Sun Classic	Swaziland	250,000	(South Africa) Jeff Hawkes (3)	6	
25 Feb	Trustbank Tournament of Champions	Transvaal	250,000	(United States) Jay Townsend (1)	8	Tour Championship

=== Unofficial events ===
The following events were sanctioned by the Southern Africa Tour, but did not carry official money, nor were wins official.

Date	Tournament	Location	Purse (R)	Winner	OWGR points	Notes
4 Dec	Nedbank Million Dollar Challenge	Transvaal	US$1,500,000	(South Africa) Fulton Allem	22	Limited-field event

== Order of Merit ==
The Order of Merit was based on prize money won during the season, calculated in South African rand.

Position	Player	Prize money (R)
1	(Zimbabwe) Tony Johnstone	254,950
2	(South Africa) John Bland	143,448
3	(South Africa) Jeff Hawkes	141,677
4	(South Africa) Wayne Westner	103,466
5	(South Africa) Chris Williams	100,384
