= Maruman Open =

Tournament information
- Location: Japan
- Established: 1980
- Tour: Japan Golf Tour
- Format: Stroke play
- Final year: 1994

Tournament record score
- Aggregate: 264 Masahiro Kuramoto (1987)
- To par: −24 as above

Final champion
- (United States) David Ishii

The Maruman Open was a professional golf tournament that was held in Japan. Founded in 1980 as the Descente Cup Hokkoku Open, it was an event on the Japan Golf Tour until 1994, except for 1984 when it was held without a title sponsor. It was hosted at several different courses.

== Tournament hosts ==
Year(s)	Host course	Location
1994	Narita Springs Golf Club	Narita, Chiba
1989–1993	Hatoyama Country Club	Hatoyama, Saitama
1987–1988	Higashimatsuyama Country Club	Higashimatsuyama, Saitama
1980–1986	Katayamazu Golf Club	Kaga, Ishikawa

== Winners ==
Year	Tour (Note: JPN − PGA of Japan Tour.)	Winner	Score	To par	Margin of victory	Runner(s)-up	Ref.
Maruman Open
1994	JPN	(United States) David Ishii	279	−9	Playoff	(Japan) Hirofumi Miyase (Japan) Nobuo Serizawa	
1993	JPN	(Philippines) Frankie Miñoza	272	−16	Playoff	(Taiwan) Chen Tze-chung	
1992	JPN	(United States) Todd Hamilton	272	−16	1 stroke	(Japan) Masashi Ozaki	
1991	JPN	(Japan) Tetsu Nishikawa	274	−14	Playoff	(Japan) Tateo Ozaki	
1990	JPN	(Japan) Masashi Ozaki (3)	273	−15	5 strokes	(Japan) Tsuneyuki Nakajima	
1989	JPN	(Japan) Koichi Suzuki	278	−10	1 stroke	(Japan) Satoshi Higashi (Japan) Tsukasa Watanabe	
1988	JPN	(Japan) Masashi Ozaki (2)	207 (Note: Shortened to 54 holes due to rain.)	−6	3 strokes	(Japan) Hajime Meshiai (Japan) Yoshimi Niizeki	
1987	JPN	(Japan) Masahiro Kuramoto	264	−24	4 strokes	(Japan) Masashi Ozaki	
1986	JPN	(Japan) Masashi Ozaki	276	−12	3 strokes	(Japan) Saburo Fujiki (Japan) Naomichi Ozaki	
1985	JPN	(Australia) Brian Jones	279	−9	1 stroke	(Japan) Teruo Suzumura	
Hokkoku Open
1984		(Japan) Shinsaku Maeda	279	−9	3 strokes	(Japan) Seiji Ebihara (Taiwan) Hsu Sheng-san	
Descente Cup Hokkoku Open
1983	JPN	(Japan) Shozo Miyamoto	283	−5	3 strokes	(Taiwan) Hsieh Yu-shu (Taiwan) Hung Wen-neng (Taiwan) Lu Hsi-chuen	
1982	JPN	(Japan) Kikuo Arai	276	−12	2 strokes	(Japan) Tsuneyuki Nakajima	
1981	JPN	(Japan) Saburo Fujiki	282	−6	2 strokes	(Japan) Katsuji Hasegawa (Japan) Masahiro Kuramoto	
1980	JPN	(Japan) Akira Yabe	278	−10	4 strokes	(Taiwan) Hsieh Yung-yo	
