= 1974 Eisenhower Trophy =

Coordinates: 18.415°N 68.937°W

Tournament information
- Dates: 30 October – 2 November
- Location: La Romana, Dominican Republic
- Courses: Casa de Campo; Teeth of the Dog course
- Format: 72 holes stroke play

Statistics
- Par: 72
- Length: 6,744 yards (6,167 m)
- Field: 35 teams 139 players

Champion
- United States; George Burns, Gary Koch, Jerry Pate & Curtis Strange
- 888 (+24)

The 1974 Eisenhower Trophy took place 30 October to 2 November at the Casa de Campo in La Romana, Dominican Republic. It was the ninth World Amateur Team Championship for the Eisenhower Trophy. The tournament was a 72-hole stroke play team event with 35 four-man teams. The best three scores for each round counted towards the team total.

The United States won the Eisenhower Trophy for the fourth successive time, finishing 10 strokes ahead of the silver medalists, Japan. Brazil took the bronze medal while South Africa finished fourth. Jaime Gonzalez from Brazil and American Jerry Pate had the lowest individual scores, six-over-par 294.

The event was originally planned to be played in Malaysia but was moved because of the inability of all member countries to compete there as the Malaysian government's policy prohibited entry into Malaysia of representatives of South Africa.

== Teams ==
35 teams contested the event. Each team except one had four players. The team representing El Salvador had only three players.

Country	Players
Argentina	Horacio Carbonetti, Juan Carlos Devoto, Jorge Ledesma, Roberto Monguzzi
Australia	Terry Gale, Tony Gresham, Colin Kaye, Phil Wood
Bahamas	Valdo Prosa, Brendan Lynch, Valdo Prosa, Michael Taylor
Belgium	John Bigwood, Benoit Dumont, Eric Boyer, Fredric Rodesch
Bermuda	Brendam Ingham, Lois Moniz, Bill Pitt, Noel van Putten
Brazil	Priscillo Diniz, Jaime Gonzalez, Rafael Navarro, Ricardo Rossi
Canada	Pierre Archambault, Bruce Brewer, Ken Doig, Doug Roxburgh
Chile	Roberto Desmaras, Mauricio Galeno, Edmund Grasty, Felipe Taverne
Chinese Taipei	Chang Ter-kuei, Chen Tze-ming, Hung Wen-nung, Liao Kuo-chih
Colombia	Albert Evers, Gustavo Giraldo, Alfonso Linares, Fernando Sanchez
Dominican Republic	Ramon Baez Jr, Jack Corrie, Luis F. Henriquez, Luis Hernandez
Ecuador	Fernando Fiore, Isidro Icaza, Joe Monge, Danilo Murtinho
El Salvador	Guillermo Aceto, Mauricio Alvarez, José Duran
France	Patrick Cotton, Alexis Godillot, George Leven, Philippe Ploujoux
Great Britain & Ireland	John Davies, Richard Eyles, Peter Hedges, Ian Hutcheon
Iceland	Johann Benediktsson, E. Gudnasson, J. Holton, Torbjörn Kjaerbo,
Italy	Antonio Lionello, Massimo Mannelli, Lorenzo Silva, Giuseppe Sita
Jamaica	Stafford Demarcado, Herman McDonald, Ian Sturdy, Bill Ward
Japan	Ginjiro Nakabe, Tsutomu Irie, Tetsuo Sakata, Satoshi Yamazaki
Mexico	Rafael Alarcón, Oscar Fernandez, Tomás Lehmann, José Ortega
Netherlands	Carel Braun, Jaap van Neck, Victor Swane, Tony Trienen
New Zealand	Richard Coombes, Ted McDougall, Ross Murray, Michael Nicholson
Norway	Erik Dønnestad, Westye Høegh, Asbjørn Ramnefjell, Alexander Vik
Panama	Francisco Arias, Leo Dehlinger, Anibal Galindo, Antonio de Janon
Papua New Guinea	Wayne Brittain, Greg Fennell, Tony Gover, John Keating
Puerto Rico	Welby van Horn, Butch James, Victor Morales, James Teale
Rhodesia	George Harvey, Mark McNulty, Denis Watson, Teddy Webber
South Africa	Coen Dreyer, Jeff Hawkes, Robbie Meier, Neville Sundelson
South Korea	Il Keun Kim, Mee Rang Kim, Youn Chang Kim, Won Taek Park
Spain	Eduardo de la Riva, Snr, José Gancedo, Nicasio Sagardia, Roman Taya
Sweden	Olle Dahlgren, Hans Hedjerson, Göran Lundquist, Jan Rube
Switzerland	Yves Hofstetter, Martin Kessler, Michel Rey, Johnny Storjohann
United States	George Burns, Gary Koch, Jerry Pate, Curtis Strange
Venezuela	Jonathan Coles, Gustavo Larrazabal, Carlos Plaza, Carlos Whaite
West Germany	Peter Jochums, Uwe Nievert, Veit Pagel, Christoph Stadler

== Scores ==
Place	Country	Score	To par
1st place, gold medalist(s)	United States	224-221-219-224=888	+24
2nd place, silver medalist(s)	Japan	226-226-219-227=898	+34
3rd place, bronze medalist(s)	Brazil	225-229-221-226=901	+37
4	South Africa	227-223-225-233=908	+44
5	Australia	235-231-229-221=916	+52
6	Great Britain & Ireland	227-233-228-234=922	+58
7	Chinese Taipei	243-227-228-230=928	+64
8	Argentina	239-227-231-234=931	+67
9	Canada	238-239-224-231=932	+68
T10	France	245-230-235-226=936	+72
T10	Sweden	237-234-235-230=936	+72
12	West Germany	242-232-231-234=939	+75
13	Spain	237-242-229-233=941	+77
14	Rhodesia	247-233-228-234=942	+78
15	New Zealand	241-237-236-233=947	+83
16	Venezuela	241-243-236-236=956	+92
17	Switzerland	245-242-233-239=959	+95
18	Italy	240-241-232-247=960	+96
19	Papua New Guinea	245-234-231-251=961	+97
20	Mexico	248-231-240-243=962	+98
21	Netherlands	248-239-244-233=964	+100
22	Chile	250-244-238-237=969	+105
23	Belgium	242-239-246-243=970	+106
24	Colombia	250-244-235-251=980	+116
25	South Korea	250-247-252-236=985	+121
26	Panama	251-249-246-242=988	+124
27	Ecuador	260-243-236-250=989	+125
T28	Jamaica	244-254-244-248=990	+126
T28	Norway	255-246-244-245=990	+126
30	Dominican Republic	257-250-246-245=998	+134
31	Puerto Rico	244-251-253-255=1003	+139
32	Bermuda	250-246-255-253=1004	+140
33	Bahamas	261-248-270-267=1046	+182
34	Iceland	288-290-268-263=1109	+245
35	El Salvador	282-288-274-282=1126	+262

== Individual leaders ==
There was no official recognition for the lowest individual scores.

Place	Player	Country	Score	To par
T1	Jaime Gonzalez	Brazil	73-74-74-73=294	+6
T1	Jerry Pate	United States	73-77-73-71=294	+6
3	Satoshi Yamazaki	Japan	73-75-76-71=295	+7
4	George Burns	United States	74-76-70-77=297	+9
T5	Priscillo Diniz	Brazil	73-80-70-77=300	+12
T5	Terry Gale	Australia	78-75-75-72=300	+12
7	Gary Koch	United States	79-70-76-76=301	+13
8	Robbie Meier	South Africa	72-76-73-81=302	+14
9	Coen Dreyer	South Africa	76-75-73-80=304	+16
T10	Tsutomu Irie	Japan	75-77-73-80=305	+17
T10	Jeff Hawkes	South Africa	79-72-79-75=305	+17
