= Tetsu Nishikawa =

Japanese professional golfer

Personal information
- Nationality: Japan
- Born: 2 May 1968 (age 58) Tokyo, Japan
- Height: 1.75 m (5 ft 9 in)
- Weight: 68 kg (150 lb; 10.7 st)

Career
- Sport: Golf
- Status: Professional
- Current tour: Japan Golf Tour
- Professional wins: 5

Number of wins by tour
- Japan Golf Tour: 3
- Other: 2

Tetsu Nishikawa (西川 哲, Nishikawa Tetsu; born 2 May 1968) is a Japanese professional golfer and ex-husband of singer and actress Momoko Kikuchi.

== Career ==
Nishikawa played on the Japan Golf Tour, winning three times.

== Professional wins (5) ==
=== PGA of Japan Tour wins (3) ===
No.	Date	Tournament	Winning score	Margin of victory	Runner(s)-up
1	25 Aug 1991	Maruman Open	−14 (68-70-66-70=274)	Playoff	(Japan) Tateo Ozaki
2	4 Apr 1993	Descente Classic	−7 (70-74-69-68=281)	2 strokes	(Japan) Shigenori Mori, (Japan) Tsuyoshi Yoneyama
3	16 Jul 1995	Nikkei Cup Torakichi Nakamura Memorial	−19 (65-67-69-68=269)	2 strokes	(Japan) Tomohiro Maruyama

PGA of Japan Tour playoff record (1–1)

No.	Year	Tournament	Opponent	Result
1	1991	Maruman Open	(Japan) Tateo Ozaki	Won with birdie on third extra hole
2	1992	Bridgestone Open	(Japan) Masahiro Kuramoto	Lost to birdie on second extra hole

=== Japan Challenge Tour wins (2) ===
- 1990 Kanto Kokusai Open, Korakuen Cup (2nd)

== Team appearances ==
- Alfred Dunhill Cup (representing Japan): 1993, 2000
