= Vincent Tshabalala =

South African professional golfer

Personal information
- Full name: Vincent Vesele Tshabalala
- Nationality: South Africa
- Born: 16 March 1942 Reitvlei, Johannesburg, Transvaal, Union of South Africa
- Died: 3 June 2017 (aged 75)
- Height: 1.73 m (5 ft 8 in)

Career
- Sport: Golf
- Turned professional: 1963
- Former tours: European Tour; Southern Africa Tour; European Seniors Tour
- Professional wins: 9

Number of wins by tour
- European Tour: 1
- Other: 8

Best results in major championships
- Masters Tournament: DNP
- PGA Championship: DNP
- U.S. Open: DNP
- The Open Championship: T56: 1977

Vincent Vesele Tshabalala (16 March 1942 – 3 June 2017) was a South African professional golfer. He won a number of tournaments organised by the non-white Tournament Players Association and in 1976 he won the French Open.

== Early life ==
Tshabalala was born on 16 March 1942 to Philip and Maria Tshabalala in Rietvlei and had eight siblings. He attended George Goch school and shortly thereafter completed an apprenticeship as a mechanic. Tshabalala was introduced to golf at Rietvlei Golf Club, where he worked as a caddie after school, and saved up for golf clubs to pursue his passion for golf, a sport that was historically a white sport.

== Professional career ==
When he turned professional it was with a mixed set of clubs bought one by one. Tshabalala was from the Zulu ethnic group.

Tshabalala started competing professionally in the 1960s on the Non-European Tour, where he had six wins, four second-place finished and third place once. He was barred from the Southern African Tour in his prime during the 1970s as a result of apartheid; however with assistance from Gary Player he gained entry to tournaments on the European Tour. He made his European Tour debut at the Madrid Open at Puerto de Hierro on 28 April 1976, finishing tied for 45th place. The following week (on 9 May 1976), he claimed a shock victory in the Open de France at Le Touquet while pulling his own bag, finishing two strokes ahead of Salvador Balbuena, winning £3,570. He was the first black man to win on the European Tour. That season, he played nine events and would finish joint 7th in the Sumrie-Bournemouth Better-Ball (with John O'Leary), 17th at the Italian Open and joint 21st in the Piccadilly Medal.

Later in 1976, Tshabalala was selected to represent South Africa with Gary Player in the 1976 World Cup but refused for political reasons. He also played on the Southern Africa Tour after racial restrictions preventing black golfers from playing the tour were removed in the early 1970s. He finished in the top-10 10 times and in the top-15 16 times, counting both regular and senior events. In 1982, Tshabalala became a member of the PGA and as president of the PGA in 1990, he played an integral part in uniting the Professional Golfers Association (PGA) and Tournament Players Association (TGA).

Tshabalala played on the European Seniors Tour from its formation in 1992. He was twice runner-up; behind John Fourie in the 1992 Belfast Telegraph Irish Senior Masters and behind Maurice Bembridge in the 1996 Hippo Jersey Seniors. He won the Nelson Mandela Invitational in both 2004 and 2005, playing with Ernie Els in the former year and with Tim Clark in the latter year.

After his active career he became a dedicated teacher of golf, more of interest to help and see people gain than to earn money. For four years he worked as pro at Mälarbadens GC in Sweden during the summers.

Tshabalala played his full shots cross-handed.

== Death ==
Tshabalala died on 3 June 2017 at the age of 75. He is buried at Avalon cemetery in Soweto.

== Awards and honors ==
- In 2003, Tshabalala earned a certificate of recognition from City of Johannesburg for his dedication to overcome racial barriers in sport and a golf award from SABC Sports for his excellent contribution to the promotion and development of golf as the premier sport in South Africa.
- In 2005, he earned a lifetime achievement award from Union of Golf Societies
- In 2010, Tshabalala was bestowed a Presidential Sports Award from President Thabo Mbeki
- In 2010, he was also inducted to the Southern Africa Golf Hall of Fame

== Professional wins (9) ==
=== European Tour wins (1) ===
No.	Date	Tournament	Winning score	Margin of victory	Runner-up
1	9 May 1976	French Open	−16 (69-70-66-67=272)	2 strokes	(Spain) Salvador Balbuena

=== Non-European Tour wins (6) ===
- 1965 South African Non-European Open
- 1971 South African Non-European Open
- 1972 Transvaal Non-European Open, Natal Non-European Open
- 1977 South African Non-European Open
- 1983 South African Non-European Open

=== Other wins (2) ===
No.	Date	Tournament	Winning score	Margin of victory	Runners-up
1	28 Nov 2004	Nelson Mandela Invitational (with (South Africa) Ernie Els)	−14 (64-66=130)	1 stroke	(South Africa) Simon Hobday and (England) Lee Westwood
2	27 Nov 2005	Nelson Mandela Invitational (2) (with (South Africa) Tim Clark)	−17 (63-64=127)	4 strokes	(South Africa) Trevor Immelman and (South Africa) Gary Player

== Results in major championships ==
Tournament	1976	1977
The Open Championship	CUT	T56

Note: Tshabalala only played in The Open Championship.
CUT = missed the half-way cut
"T" = tied
