= Nelson Mandela Invitational =

The Nelson Mandela Invitational was a charity golf tournament which took place annually in South Africa from 2000 until 2006. It was named in honor of former South African President Nelson Mandela, and hosted by South Africa's most successful professional golfer Gary Player. Player and Mandela appeared at the event almost every year to accept proceeds on behalf of the Children's Fund and the Player Foundation who were equal beneficiaries.

Just prior to the 2007 edition, the Nelson Mandela Children's Fund withdrew their support citing concerns over Player's involvement with the design of a golf course in Burma. Both Mandela and Desmond Tutu subsequently accepted Gary Player's position and statement on Burma and requested that the event continue, however the Children's Fund CEO refused to do so and thus forfeited on the name and future charitable funds raised through the tournament. The event continued as the Gary Player Invitational until 2013.

The field was made up of eight teams of four, each consisting of a senior professional, a regular tour professional, a celebrity and a businessman. The teams competed for the Alliance Medal, in which the best two scores of the four players counted on each hole. A second better-ball competition for the professionals was staged, with the best score of the two counting on each hole.

== Winners ==
=== Pro-Am Team Tournament (2000–2013) ===
Gary Player Team Invitational: (4 player team)

Year	Winners
2013	Retief Goosen, Herschelle Gibbs, Anthony Leeming, Mike Dladla
2012	Tim Clark, Kenny Dalglish, Alex Maditsi, Doug Jackson
2011	Wessel Witthuhn, Shaun Pollock
2010	John Cook, Sergio García, Sinead Kenny, Dwight Yorke
2009	Thomas Aiken, Vincent Tshabalala, DJ Spoony, Abdullah Al Naboodah
2008	Retief Goosen, Costantino Rocca, Ines Sastre, Alan Pearson
2007	Luke Donald, Sally Little, Alex Maditsi, Marc Player

Nelson Mandela Team Invitational: (4 player team)

Year	Winners
2006	Sandy Lyle, Omar Sandys, Ashleigh Simon, David Lyons
2005	Gary Player, Trevor Immelman, Ahmad Rashad, Alex Maditsi
2004	Lee Westwood, Simon Hobday, Inés Sastre, Doug Jackson
2003	Lee Westwood, Simon Hobday, Mark Boucher, Carl Ware
2002	Hugh Baiocchi, Deane Pappas, Gary Lineker, Dave King
2001	Simon Hobday, Martin Maritz, Nick Mallet, Doug Jackson
2000	Gary Player, Don Gammon, Julius Erving, Dave King

== Winners ==
=== Professional Tournament (2000–2011) ===
Gary Player Invitational

Year	Winners
2011	George Coetzee and Mark James
2010	John Cook and Sergio García
2009	Ángel Cabrera and Tony Johnstone
2008	Bobby Lincoln and Garth Mulroy
2007	Sally Little and Luke Donald

Nelson Mandela Invitational

Year	Winners
2006	Bobby Lincoln and Retief Goosen
2005	Vincent Tshabalala and Tim Clark
2004	Vincent Tshabalala and Ernie Els
2003	Lee Westwood and Simon Hobday
2002	Hugh Baiocchi and Deane Pappas
2001	Simon Hobday and Martin Maritz
2000	Retief Goosen and Allan Henning
