= 2000 WGC-World Cup =

2000 World Cup
Tournament information
- Dates: 7–10 December
- Location: Buenos Aires, Argentina; 34.467°S 58.699°W
- Course: Buenos Aires Golf Club
- Format: 72 holes stroke play (best ball & alternate shot)

Statistics
- Par: 72
- Length: 6,896 yards (6,306 m)
- Field: 24 two-man teams
- Cut: None
- Prize fund: US$3.0 million
- Winner's share: US$1.0 million

Champion
- United States; David Duval & Tiger Woods
- 254 (−34)
- Location in South America Location in Argentina Location in Buenos Aires Province

The 2000 WGC-World Cup took place 7–10 December at the Buenos Aires Golf Club in Buenos Aires, Argentina. It was the 46th World Cup and the first as a World Golf Championship event. 24 countries competed and each country sent two players. The prize money totaled $3,000,000 with $1,000,000 going to the winning pair. The American team of David Duval and Tiger Woods won by three strokes over the home Argentine team of Ángel Cabrera and Eduardo Romero.

== Qualification and format ==
18 teams qualified based on the Official World Golf Ranking and were six teams via qualifiers.

The tournament was a 72-hole stroke play team event with each team consisting of two players. The first and third days were fourball play and the second and final days were foursomes play.

== Teams ==
Country	Players
Argentina	Ángel Cabrera and Eduardo Romero
Australia	Peter O'Malley and Lucas Parsons
Canada	Glen Hnatiuk and Mike Weir
Colombia	Jesús Amaya and Gustavo Mendoza
England	Brian Davis and Jamie Spence
Finland	Mikael Piltz and Kalle Väinölä
France	Thomas Levet and Jean van de Velde
Germany	Alex Čejka and Thomas Gögele
Ireland	Pádraig Harrington and Paul McGinley
Japan	Shigeki Maruyama and Hidemichi Tanaka
Malaysia	Danny Chia and Rashid Ishmail
New Zealand	Frank Nobilo and Greg Turner
Paraguay	Carlos Franco and Esteban Isasi
Scotland	Paul Lawrie and Gary Orr
South Africa	Darren Fichardt and Retief Goosen
South Korea	Choi Gwang-soo and Park Nam-sin
Spain	Miguel Ángel Jiménez and José María Olazábal
Sweden	Pierre Fulke and Mathias Grönberg
Thailand	Chawalit Plaphol and Thammanoon Sriroj
Trinidad and Tobago	Robert Ames and Stephen Ames
United States	David Duval and Tiger Woods
Venezuela	Cipriano Castro and Miguel Martinez
Wales	Phillip Price and Ian Woosnam
Zimbabwe	Tony Johnstone and Mark McNulty

== Scores ==
Place	Country	Score	To par	Money (US$)
1	United States	61-65-60-68=254	−34	1,000,000
2	Argentina	57-67-65-68=257	−31	500,000
3	Paraguay	64-66-68-67=265	−23	300,000
4	Japan	60-71-67-68=266	−22	150,000
5	Scotland	64-69-65-70=268	−20	115,000
6	New Zealand	57-67-65-80=269	−19	100,000
T7	Germany	62-69-66-73=270	−18	80,000
T7	Spain	63-69-67-71=270	−18	80,000
T7	Sweden	64-70-63-73=270	−18	80,000
T10	Canada	61-72-62-76=271	−17	57,500
T10	Ireland	64-66-66-75=271	−17	57,500
T12	Australia	58-70-69-75=272	−16	45,000
T12	South Africa	65-72-66-69=272	−16	45,000
T12	Zimbabwe	62-72-67-71=272	−16	45,000
15	Wales	68-64-67-74=273	−15	39,000
16	England	66-69-70-69=274	−14	38,000
T17	South Korea	61-72-66-79=278	−10	36,500
T17	Thailand	63-70-66-79=278	−10	36,500
19	Trinidad and Tobago	68-67-67-77=279	−9	35,000
20	France	62-72-70-76=280	−8	34,000
21	Finland	68-70-70-73=281	−7	33,000
22	Colombia	66-67-72-79=284	−4	32,000
23	Malaysia	70-74-71-81=296	+8	31,000
24	Venezuela	67-81-68-84=300	+12	30,000
