= 1983–84 Southern Africa Tour =

Golf tour season

1983–84 Southern Africa Tour season
- Duration: 25 January 1984 – 2 March 1984
- Number of official events: 6
- Most wins: (Zimbabwe) Tony Johnstone (2)
- Order of Merit: (South Africa) Gavan Levenson

The 1983–84 Southern Africa Tour was the 13th season of the Southern Africa Tour, the main professional golf tour in South Africa since it was formed in 1971.

== Season outline ==
Local golfers Mark McNulty, Gavan Levenson, and Tony Johnstone had much success at the beginning of the season. The first tournament of the year, the PAN AM Wild Coast, was won by McNulty. The following week, Levenson won the Lexington PGA Championship, defeating Nick Price by three shots. At the next event, the South African Open, Zimbabwe's Johnstone was victorious. Johnstone would go on to win the following week as well at the SA Charity Classic. It was Levenson, however, that would go on to win the Order of Merit.

The final two events of the year were won by foreign players. At the ICL International, Northern Ireland's David Feherty was victorious. At the final event of the year, the Swazi Sun Pro-Am, American Rick Hartmann defeated Teddy Webber by one shot.

== Schedule ==
The following table lists official events during the 1983–84 season.

Date	Tournament	Location	Purse (R)	Winner (Note: The number in brackets after each winner's name is the number of Southern Africa Tour events they had won up to and including that tournament. This information is only shown for Southern Africa Tour members.)	Notes
28 Jan	PAN AM Wild Coast	Cape	150,000	(Zimbabwe) Mark McNulty (7)	New tournament
4 Feb	Lexington PGA Championship	Transvaal	100,000	(South Africa) Gavan Levenson (2)	
11 Feb	South African Open	Transvaal	100,000	(Zimbabwe) Tony Johnstone (1)	
18 Feb	SA Charity Classic	Transvaal	80,000	(Zimbabwe) Tony Johnstone (2)	New tournament
25 Feb	ICL International	Transvaal	60,000	(Northern Ireland) David Feherty (1)	
2 Mar	Swazi Sun Pro-Am	Swaziland	60,000	(United States) Rick Hartmann (1)	Pro-Am

=== Unofficial events ===
The following events were sanctioned by the Southern Africa Tour, but did not carry official money, nor were wins official.

Date	Tournament	Location	Purse (R)	Winner	Notes
4 Dec	Nedbank Million Dollar Challenge	Transvaal	US$1,000,000	(Spain) Seve Ballesteros	Limited-field event

== Order of Merit ==
The Order of Merit was based on prize money won during the season, calculated in South African rand.

Position	Player	Prize money (R)
1	(South Africa) Gavan Levenson	43,940
2	(Zimbabwe) Tony Johnstone	36,988
3	Nick Price	30,655
4	(Zimbabwe) Mark McNulty	28,042
5	(South Africa) Fulton Allem	23,199
