= 1993 Dunhill Cup =

Coordinates: 56.351484°N 2.816147°W

Tournament information
- Dates: 14–17 October
- Location: St Andrews, Scotland
- Course: Old Course at St Andrews
- Format: Match play

Statistics
- Par: 72
- Length: 6,933 yards (6,340 m)
- Field: 16 teams of 3 players
- Prize fund: US$1,500,000
- Winner's share: US$450,000

Champion
- United States (Fred Couples, John Daly, Payne Stewart)

The 1993 Dunhill Cup was the ninth Dunhill Cup. It was a team tournament featuring 16 countries, each represented by three players. The Cup was played 14–17 October at the Old Course at St Andrews in Scotland. The sponsor was the Alfred Dunhill company. The American team of Fred Couples, John Daly, and Payne Stewart beat the English team of Peter Baker, Nick Faldo, and Mark James in the final. It was the second win for the United States.

== Format ==
The Cup was a match play event played over four days. The teams were divided into four four-team groups. The top eight teams were seeded with the remaining teams randomly placed in the groups. After three rounds of round-robin play, the top team in each group advanced to a single elimination playoff.

In each team match, the three players were paired with their opponents and played 18 holes at medal match play. Matches tied at the end of 18 holes were extended to a sudden-death playoff. The tie-breaker for ties within a group was based on match record, then head-to-head.

== Group play ==
=== Round one ===
Group 1

Zimbabwe – 0		Ireland – 3	
Player	Score	Player	Score
Tony Johnstone	75	Ronan Rafferty	74
Mark McNulty	74	Paul McGinley	74
Nick Price	72	David Feherty	71

McGinley won on the fourth playoff hole.

Spain – 2		Argentina – 1	
Player	Score	Player	Score
José María Olazábal	69	José Cóceres	72
Miguel Ángel Jiménez	78	Vicente Fernández	74
José Rivero	73	Eduardo Romero	76

Group 2

South Africa – 2		Taiwan – 1	
Player	Score	Player	Score
Fulton Allem	71	Chung Chun-hsing	80
Ernie Els	71	Chen Liang-hsi	77
David Frost	77	Yuan Ching-Chi	73

England – 3		Mexico – 0	
Player	Score	Player	Score
Peter Baker	73	Carlos Espinoza	75
Nick Faldo	72	Rafael Alarcón	75
Mark James	75	Juan Brito	80

Group 3

Scotland – 1		Paraguay – 2	
Player	Score	Player	Score
Sam Torrance	74	Carlos Franco	70
Gordon Brand Jnr	71	Ángel Franco	77
Colin Montgomerie	75	Raúl Fretes	74

United States – 3		Wales – 0	
Player	Score	Player	Score
John Daly	72	Mark Mouland	77
Payne Stewart	78	Paul Mayo	80
Fred Couples	71	Ian Woosnam	72

Group 4

Australia – 1		Canada – 2	
Player	Score	Player	Score
Peter Senior	77	Richard Zokol	70
Rodger Davis	71	Jim Rutledge	71
Craig Parry	73	Dave Barr	73

Rutledge won on the first playoff hole.
Parry won on the second playoff hole.

Sweden – 3		Japan – 0	
Player	Score	Player	Score
Jesper Parnevik	68	Tetsu Nishikawa	80
Joakim Haeggman	71	Yoshi Mizumaki	73
Anders Forsbrand	73	Tsuyoshi Yoneyama	74

=== Round two ===
Group 1

Zimbabwe – 2		Argentina – 1	
Player	Score	Player	Score
Nick Price	71	Eduardo Romero	71
Mark McNulty	69	Vicente Fernández	71
Tony Johnstone	76	José Cóceres	76

Romero won on the first playoff hole.
Johnstone won on the third playoff hole.

Ireland – 1		Spain – 2	
Player	Score	Player	Score
David Feherty	72	Miguel Ángel Jiménez	74
Paul McGinley	74	José Rivero	72
Ronan Rafferty	74	José María Olazábal	71

Group 2

South Africa – 1		Mexico – 2	
Player	Score	Player	Score
Ernie Els	73	Rafael Alarcón	72
Fulton Allem	72	Carlos Espinoza	72
David Frost	70	Juan Brito	75

Espinoza won on the first playoff hole.

England – 2		Taiwan – 1	
Player	Score	Player	Score
Peter Baker	71	Yuan Ching-Chi	76
Nick Faldo	73	Chen Liang-hsi	72
Mark James	71	Chung Chun-hsing	77

Group 3

United States – 2		Paraguay – 1	
Player	Score	Player	Score
John Daly	76	Ángel Franco	76
Payne Stewart	70	Raúl Fretes	73
Fred Couples	70	Carlos Franco	73

Franco won on the second playoff hole.

Scotland – 3		Wales – 0	
Player	Score	Player	Score
Colin Montgomerie	67	Ian Woosnam	74
Sam Torrance	71	Paul Mayo	78
Gordon Brand Jnr	72	Mark Mouland	75

Group 4

Australia – 1		Japan – 2	
Player	Score	Player	Score
Rodger Davis	74	Yoshi Mizumaki	73
Craig Parry	74	Tsuyoshi Yoneyama	74
Peter Senior	78	Tetsu Nishikawa	75

Parry won on the second playoff hole.

Sweden – 2		Canada – 1	
Player	Score	Player	Score
Jesper Parnevik	72	Richard Zokol	71
Joakim Haeggman	71	Jim Rutledge	73
Anders Forsbrand	69	Dave Barr	71

=== Round three ===
Group 1

Ireland – 3		Argentina – 0	
Player	Score	Player	Score
Ronan Rafferty	74	José Cóceres	77
Paul McGinley	75	Vicente Fernández	78
David Feherty	72	Eduardo Romero	76

Zimbabwe – 2		Spain – 1	
Player	Score	Player	Score
Nick Price	77	José María Olazábal	73
Mark McNulty	76	Miguel Ángel Jiménez	77
Tony Johnstone	74	José Rivero	74

Rivero won on the second playoff hole.

Group 2

South Africa – 2		England – 1	
Player	Score	Player	Score
Ernie Els	72	Peter Baker	71
Fulton Allem	71	Mark James	79
David Frost	70	Nick Faldo	74

Taiwan – 2		Mexico – 1	
Player	Score	Player	Score
Chen Liang-hsi	76	Rafael Alarcón	73
Chung Chun-hsing	79	Carlos Espinoza	87
Yuan Ching-Chi	81	Juan Brito	82

Group 3

Paraguay – 2		Wales – 1	
Player	Score	Player	Score
Carlos Franco	74	Ian Woosnam	70
Raúl Fretes	77	Paul Mayo	78
Ángel Franco	74	Mark Mouland	75

Scotland – 0		United States – 3	
Player	Score	Player	Score
Sam Torrance	78	John Daly	73
Gordon Brand Jnr	80	Payne Stewart	74
Colin Montgomerie	73	Fred Couples	69

Group 4

Canada – 2		Japan – 1	
Player	Score	Player	Score
Dave Barr	74	Tetsu Nishikawa	76
Jim Rutledge	81	Tsuyoshi Yoneyama	75
Richard Zokol	72	Yoshi Mizumaki	77

Australia – 1		Sweden – 2	
Player	Score	Player	Score
Rodger Davis	77	Jesper Parnevik	75
Peter Senior	82	Anders Forsbrand	72
Craig Parry	74	Joakim Haeggman	82

=== Standings ===
Group 1
Country	W	L	MW	ML
Ireland	2	1	7	2
Spain	2	1	5	4
Zimbabwe	2	1	4	5
Argentina	0	3	2	7

Group 2
Country	W	L	MW	ML
England	2	1	6	3
South Africa	2	1	5	4
Taiwan	1	2	4	5
Mexico	1	2	3	6

Group 3
Country	W	L	MW	ML
United States	3	0	8	1
Paraguay	2	1	5	4
Scotland	1	2	4	5
Wales	0	3	1	8

Group 4
Country	W	L	MW	ML
Sweden	3	0	7	2
Canada	2	1	5	4
Japan	1	2	3	6
Australia	0	3	3	6

== Playoffs ==
=== Bracket ===
Semi-finals
5	England	3
Ireland	0
6	United States	2
7	Sweden	1

Final
5	England	1
6	United States	2

=== Semi-finals ===
England – 3		Ireland – 0	
Player	Score	Player	Score
Mark James	67	Ronan Rafferty	70
Peter Baker	72	David Feherty	73
Nick Faldo	70	Paul McGinley	74

United States – 2		Sweden – 1	
Player	Score	Player	Score
Payne Stewart	68	Jesper Parnevik	66
John Daly	68	Joakim Haeggman	71
Fred Couples	67	Anders Forsbrand	69

=== Final ===
England – 1		United States – 2	
Player	Score	Player	Score
Mark James	70	Payne Stewart	74
Nick Faldo	69	Fred Couples	68
Peter Baker	73	John Daly	70

== Team results ==
Country	Place	W	L	MW	ML	Seed
United States	1	5	0	12	3	6
England	2	3	2	10	5	5
Sweden	T3	3	1	8	4	7
Ireland	T3	2	2	7	5	
Canada	T5	2	1	5	4	
Paraguay	T5	2	1	5	4	
South Africa	T5	2	1	5	4	4
Spain	T5	2	1	5	4	8
Zimbabwe	T5	2	1	4	5	1
Scotland	T10	1	2	4	5	3
Taiwan	T10	1	2	4	5	
Japan	T10	1	2	3	6	
Mexico	T10	1	2	3	6	
Australia	T14	0	3	3	6	2
Argentina	T14	0	3	2	7	
Wales	T14	0	3	1	8	

== Player results ==
Country	Player	W	L
United States	Fred Couples	5	0
United States	John Daly	4	1
United States	Payne Stewart	3	2
England	Peter Baker	4	1
England	Mark James	4	1
England	Nick Faldo	2	3
Sweden	Anders Forsbrand	3	1
Sweden	Jesper Parnevik	3	1
Sweden	Joakim Haeggman	2	2
Ireland	David Feherty	3	1
Ireland	Paul McGinley	2	2
Ireland	Ronan Rafferty	2	2
Canada	Richard Zokol	3	0
Canada	Dave Barr	1	2
Canada	Jim Rutledge	1	2
Paraguay	Ángel Franco	2	1
Paraguay	Raúl Fretes	2	1
Paraguay	Carlos Franco	1	2
South Africa	Fulton Allem	2	1
South Africa	David Frost	2	1
South Africa	Ernie Els	1	2
Spain	José María Olazábal	3	0
Spain	José Rivero	2	1
Spain	Miguel Ángel Jiménez	0	3
Zimbabwe	Tony Johnstone	2	1
Zimbabwe	Mark McNulty	2	1
Zimbabwe	Nick Price	0	3
Scotland	Gordon Brand Jnr	2	1
Scotland	Colin Montgomerie	1	2
Scotland	Sam Torrance	1	2
Taiwan	Yuan Ching-Chi	2	1
Taiwan	Chen Liang-hsi	1	2
Taiwan	Chung Chun-hsing	1	2
Japan	Yoshi Mizumaki	1	2
Japan	Tetsu Nishikawa	1	2
Japan	Tsuyoshi Yoneyama	1	2
Mexico	Rafael Alarcón	2	1
Mexico	Carlos Espinoza	1	2
Mexico	Juan Brito	0	3
Australia	Craig Parry	3	0
Australia	Rodger Davis	0	3
Australia	Peter Senior	0	3
Argentina	Vicente Fernández	1	2
Argentina	Eduardo Romero	1	2
Argentina	José Cóceres	0	3
Wales	Ian Woosnam	1	2
Wales	Paul Mayo	0	3
Wales	Mark Mouland	0	3
