= Tony Johnstone =

Zimbabwean professional golfer (born 1956)

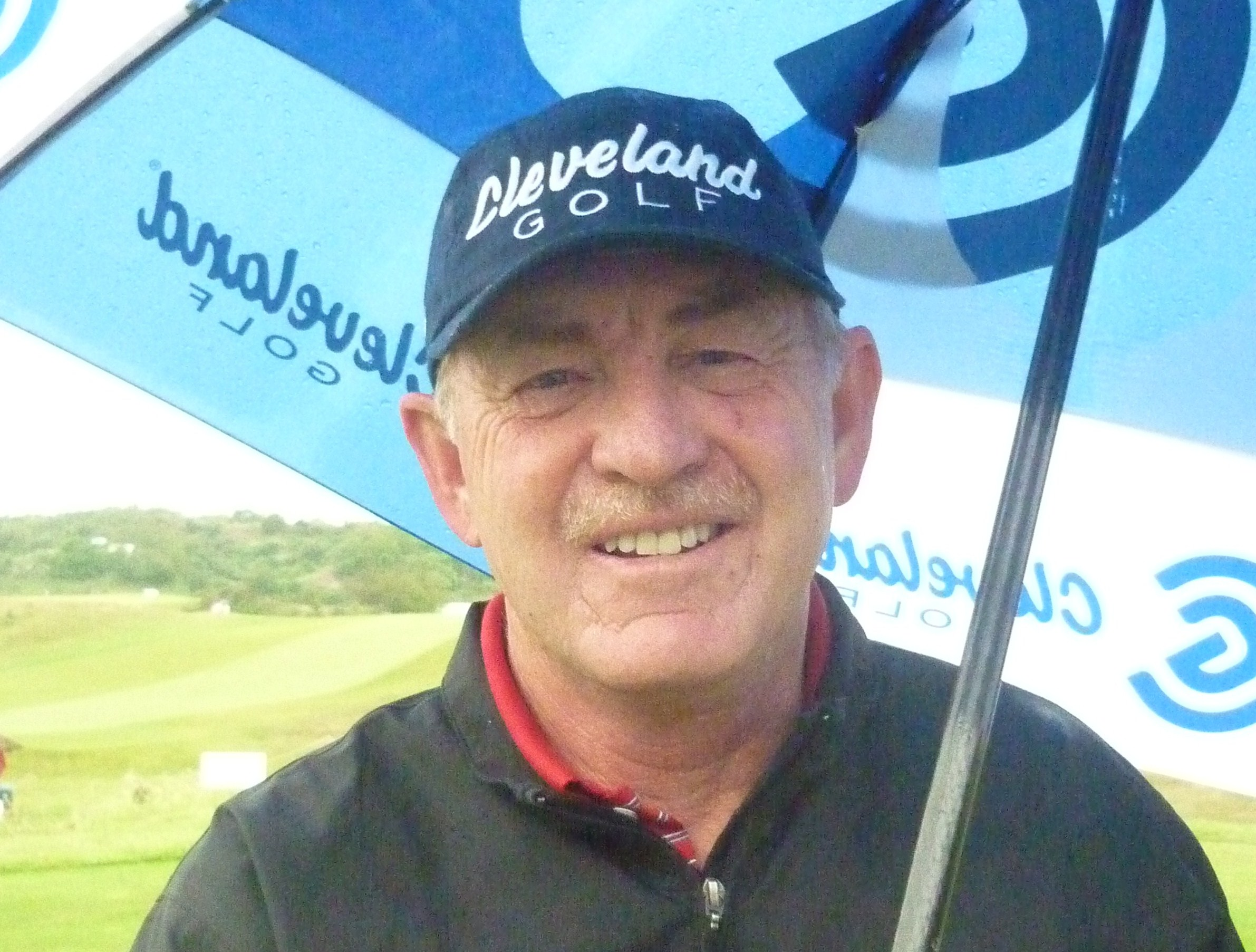

Personal information
- Full name: Anthony Alastair Johnstone
- Nationality: Zimbabwe
- Born: 2 May 1956 (age 70) Bulawayo, Southern Rhodesia (now Zimbabwe)
- Height: 1.74 m (5 ft 9 in)
- Weight: 68 kg (150 lb; 10.7 st)

Career
- Sport: Golf
- Turned professional: 1979
- Former tours: European Tour; Sunshine Tour; European Senior Tour
- Professional wins: 25
- Highest ranking: 22 (30 January 1994)

Number of wins by tour
- European Tour: 6
- Sunshine Tour: 17
- European Senior Tour: 2
- Other: 1

Best results in major championships
- Masters Tournament: CUT: 1993
- PGA Championship: CUT: 1992, 1993, 1994
- U.S. Open: T77: 1993
- The Open Championship: T34: 1992

Achievements and awards
- Southern Africa Tour Order of Merit winner: 1988–89, 1993–94

Anthony Alastair Johnstone (born 2 May 1956) is a Zimbabwean professional golfer.

== Career ==
Johnstone was born in Bulawayo, Rhodesia. He attended Christian Brothers College.

In 1979, Johnstone turned professional and has spent his career playing mainly on the Southern African Tour and the European Tour. He won six times in Europe and finished a career best seventh on the European Tour Order of Merit in 1992. His most prestigious win came at the 1992 British PGA Championship. He won seventeen times on the Southern African Tour and topped the tour's Order of Merit in 1988–89 and 1993–94. He has represented Zimbabwe in international competition many times.

In 2008, he won his first EST event, the Jersey Seniors Classic. He won his second event on the Senior tour in 2009 at the Travis Perkins plc Senior Masters.

Johnstone is noted for his excellent short game and topped the European Tour's short game statistics in 1998, 1999 and 2000.

=== Broadcasting career ===
Johnstone currently works for Sky Sports as a golf commentator. He was also a presenter for a television series called Bush Hacking. Three seasons were produced which were filmed in the Kruger Park and Shamwari in South Africa. The two minute episodes were broadcast as fillers during live golf coverage on Sky Sports and also broadcast on SuperGolf on SuperSport.

He has also played some on the European Seniors Tour.

== Personal life ==
In 2004, Johnstone was diagnosed with multiple sclerosis, possibly ending his playing career. With a revolutionary drug treatment, he appears to have put his MS in remission.

Johnstone lives in Sunningdale, England.

== Professional wins (25) ==
=== European Tour wins (6) ===
Legend
Flagship events (1)
Other European Tour (5)

No.	Date	Tournament	Winning score	Margin of victory	Runner(s)-up
1	4 Nov 1984	Portuguese Open	−14 (70-69-67-68=274)	3 strokes	(England) Michael King
2	12 Aug 1990	Murphy's Cup	50 pts (6-23-6-15=50)	2 points	(England) Malcolm MacKenzie
3	9 Jun 1991	Murphy's Cup (2)	40 pts (10-9-9-12=40)	Playoff	(Republic of Ireland) Eamonn Darcy
4	25 May 1992	Volvo PGA Championship	−16 (67-70-70-65=272)	2 strokes	(Scotland) Gordon Brand Jnr, (Spain) José María Olazábal
5	15 Feb 1998	Alfred Dunhill South African PGA Championship^{1}	−17 (68-64-67-72=271)	2 strokes	(South Africa) Ernie Els
6	11 Mar 2001	Qatar Masters	−14 (68-70-66-70=274)	2 strokes	(Sweden) Robert Karlsson

^{1}Co-sanctioned by the Southern Africa Tour

European Tour playoff record (1–4)

No.	Year	Tournament	Opponent(s)	Result
1	1981	Swiss Open	(Spain) Antonio Garrido, (Spain) Manuel Piñero	Piñero won with birdie on first extra hole
2	1991	Murphy's Cup	(Republic of Ireland) Eamonn Darcy	Won with eagle on second extra hole
3	1992	Benson & Hedges International Open	(Australia) Peter Senior	Lost to par on first extra hole
4	1992	Dunhill British Masters	(Republic of Ireland) Christy O'Connor Jnr	Lost to birdie on first extra hole
5	1996	Turespaña Masters	(Spain) Diego Borrego	Lost to par on third extra hole

=== Southern Africa Tour wins (17) ===
No.	Date	Tournament	Winning score	Margin of victory	Runner(s)-up
1	11 Feb 1984	South African Open	−14 (67-65-72-70=274)	3 strokes	(South Africa) Fulton Allem
2	18 Feb 1984	SA Charity Classic	−26 (63-71-63-69=266)	2 strokes	(South Africa) Gavan Levenson
3	15 Dec 1984	Safmarine South African Masters	−11 (68-66-70-73=277)	1 stroke	(South Africa) Fulton Allem
4	21 Dec 1986	Goodyear Classic	−9 (69-67-70-69=275)	1 stroke	(South Africa) Fulton Allem
5	18 Jan 1987	ICL International	−17 (69-67-64-71=271)	6 strokes	(South Africa) Justin Hobday, (South Africa) Wilhelm Winsnes
6	14 Nov 1987	Minolta Copiers Match Play	−6 (66)	3 strokes	(Zimbabwe) Mark McNulty
7	27 Nov 1987	Protea Assurance Challenge	−18 (66-64-67-65=262)	7 strokes	(South Africa) Hugh Baiocchi
8	16 Jan 1988	ICL International (2)	−22 (66-66-65-69=266)	1 stroke	(England) Denis Durnian
9	13 Nov 1988	Minolta Copiers Match Play (2)	−1 (71)	2 strokes	(South Africa) Wayne Westner
10	19 Nov 1988	Bloemfontein Classic	−12 (66-71-69-69=276)	2 strokes	(England) Phil Harrison, (South West Africa) Schalk van der Merwe
11	21 Jan 1989	Lexington PGA Championship	−11 (71-65-66-67=269)	Playoff	(South Africa) Chris Williams
12	24 Feb 1990	Palabora Classic	−14 (73-70-65-66=274)	3 strokes	(South Africa) John Bland, (South Africa) Wayne Westner
13	28 Feb 1993	EVS South African Masters (2)	−13 (67-66-68-74=275)	1 stroke	(South Africa) Roger Wessels
14	28 Nov 1993	Zimbabwe Open	−15 (71-68-66-68=273)	8 strokes	(South Africa) Nic Henning, (South Africa) James Kingston
15	12 Dec 1993	Phillips South African Open (2)	−21 (64-69-69-65=267)	7 strokes	(South Africa) Ernie Els
16	9 Jan 1994	Bell's Cup	−17 (65-68-68-70=271)	3 strokes	(South Africa) Ernie Els, (South Africa) David Frost
17	15 Feb 1998	Alfred Dunhill South African PGA Championship^{1} (2)	−17 (68-64-67-72=271)	2 strokes	(South Africa) Ernie Els

^{1}Co-sanctioned by the European Tour

Southern Africa Tour playoff record (1–1)

No.	Year	Tournament	Opponent	Result
1	1989	Lexington PGA Championship	(South Africa) Chris Williams	Won with birdie on first extra hole
2	1994	Autopage Mount Edgecombe Trophy	(United States) Bruce Vaughan	Lost to par on second extra hole

=== Other wins (1) ===
No.	Date	Tournament	Winning score	Margin of victory	Runners-up
1	28 Nov 2009	Gary Player Invitational (with (Argentina) Ángel Cabrera)	−15 (66-65=131)	3 strokes	(South Africa) John Bland and (South Africa) Tjaart van der Walt, (Scotland) Bill Longmuir and (South Africa) Omar Sandys

=== European Senior Tour wins (2) ===
No.	Date	Tournament	Winning score	Margin of victory	Runner(s)-up
1	8 Jun 2008	Jersey Seniors Classic	−3 (69-70-74=213)	2 strokes	(England) Gordon J. Brand, (Scotland) Ross Drummond, (Paraguay) Ángel Franco, (South Africa) Bertus Smit
2	6 Sep 2009	Travis Perkins plc Senior Masters	−10 (69-71-66=206)	1 stroke	(Australia) Peter Senior

== Results in major championships ==
Tournament	1982	1983	1984	1985	1986	1987	1988	1989	1990	1991	1992	1993	1994	1995	1996	1997	1998	1999	2000
Masters Tournament												CUT							
U.S. Open												T77							
The Open Championship	CUT	CUT	CUT	T39	CUT		CUT	T52		T73	T34	CUT	CUT	CUT	CUT		CUT		CUT
PGA Championship											CUT	CUT	CUT						

Did not play

CUT = missed the half-way cut (3rd round cut in 1982 Open Championship)
"T" indicates a tie for a place

== Team appearances ==
Amateur

- Eisenhower Trophy (representing Rhodesia): 1976

Professional

- Hennessy Cognac Cup (representing the Rest of the World): 1982
- Alfred Dunhill Cup (representing Zimbabwe): 1993, 1994, 1995, 1996, 1997, 1998, 1999, 2000
- World Cup (representing Zimbabwe): 1994, 1995, 1996, 1997, 1998, 1999, 2000, 2001
- Alfred Dunhill Challenge (representing Southern Africa): 1995 (winners)
