= Open V33 Grand Lyon =

Tournament information
- Location: Lyon, France
- Established: 1992
- Course: Golf Club de Lyon
- Par: 72
- Tour: European Tour
- Format: Stroke play
- Prize fund: £225,000
- Month played: April
- Final year: 1994

Tournament record score
- Aggregate: 267 David J. Russell (1992); 267 Costantino Rocca (1993)
- To par: −21 as above

Final champion
- (Trinidad and Tobago) Stephen Ames
- Location in France Location in Auvergne-Rhône-Alpes

The Open V33 Grand Lyon was a golf tournament on the European Tour which was played annually from 1992 to 1994. It was played at Golf Club de Lyon in Villette-d'Anthon near Lyon, France.

== Winners ==
Year	Winner	Score	To par	Margin of victory	Runner(s)-up
Open V33 Grand Lyon
1994	(Trinidad and Tobago) Stephen Ames	282	−6	2 strokes	(Sweden) Gabriel Hjertstedt (Spain) Pedro Linhart
Open de Lyon
1993	(Italy) Costantino Rocca	267	−21	6 strokes	(Sweden) Joakim Haeggman (Sweden) Gabriel Hjertstedt (England) Barry Lane (Republic of Ireland) Paul McGinley
Lyon Open V33
1992	(England) David J. Russell	267	−21	6 strokes	(Australia) Brett Ogle
