= Volvo Open di Firenze =

Tournament information
- Location: Florence, Italy
- Established: 1989
- Course: Ugolino Golf Club
- Par: 71
- Tour: European Tour
- Format: Stroke play
- Prize fund: £225,000
- Month played: March
- Final year: 1992

Tournament record score
- Aggregate: 265 Eduardo Romero (1990)
- To par: −23 as above

Final champion
- (Sweden) Anders Forsbrand
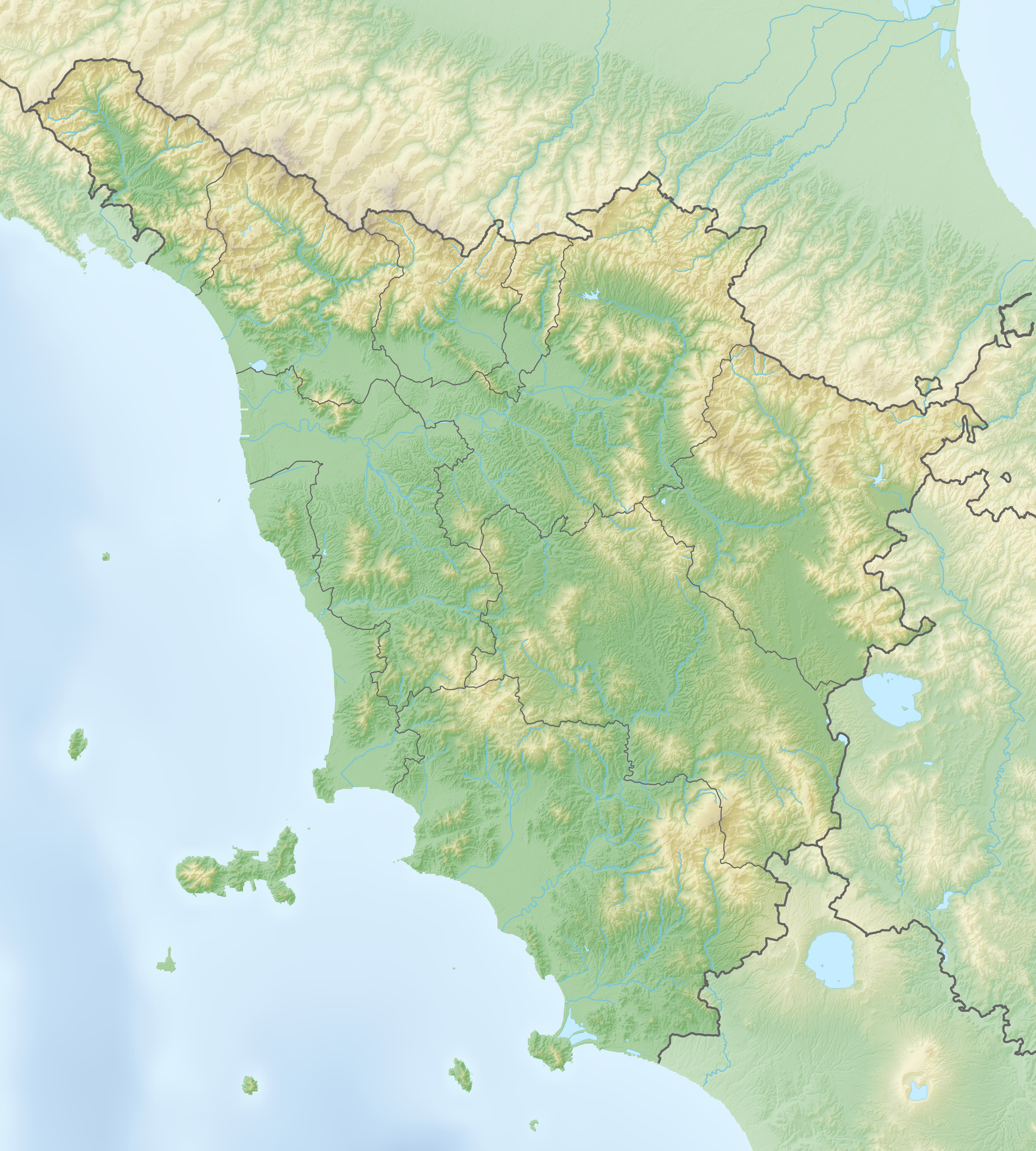
- Location in Italy Location in Tuscany

The Volvo Open di Firenze was a men's professional golf tournament on the European Tour which was played in Italy from 1989 to 1992.

The first edition took place in Sardinia and was called the Volvo Open Championship, with the other three taking place in Florence, and being named for that city.

The most notable winner was future World Number 1 Vijay Singh of Fiji, whose victory in 1989 was his first on the European Tour, and the most prestigious of his career up to that date.

In its final year the prize fund was £225,000, which was one of the smallest on the European Tour that year.

== Winners ==
Year	Winner	Score	To par	Margin of victory	Runner(s)-up	Venue
Volvo Open di Firenze
1992	(Sweden) Anders Forsbrand (2)	271	−13	1 stroke	(England) Barry Lane	Ugolino
1991	(Sweden) Anders Forsbrand	274	−14	1 stroke	(Australia) Peter Senior	Ugolino
1990	(Argentina) Eduardo Romero	265	−23	1 stroke	(England) Russell Claydon (Scotland) Colin Montgomerie	Ugolino
Volvo Open Championship
1989	(Fiji) Vijay Singh	276	−12	3 strokes	(Australia) Peter Fowler	Is Molas
