= Murphy's Cup =

Tournament information
- Location: Fulford, North Yorkshire, England
- Established: 1989
- Course: Fulford Golf Club
- Tour: European Tour
- Format: Stroke play
- Prize fund: £350,000
- Month played: June
- Final year: 1991

Tournament record score
- Score: 50 points Tony Johnstone (1990)

Final champion
- (Zimbabwe) Tony Johnstone
- Location in England Location in North Yorkshire

The Murphy's Cup was a golf tournament on the European Tour from 1989 to 1991.

In its inaugural year it was held opposite the PLM Open and listed on the tour schedule as an "Approved Special Event". As such it did not count towards the Order of Merit, and Hugh Baiocchi's victory is not recognised as an official tour win. In 1990 it was elevated to full tour status.

The Murphy's Cup used Stableford scoring, with a modified version of the points system being operated in 1990 and 1991: two points were awarded for birdie, four for an eagle and six for an albatross, while one point was deducted for a bogey and two for a double bogey or worse.

== Winners ==
Year	Winner	Score	Margin of victory	Runner(s)-up	Venue
1991	(Zimbabwe) Tony Johnstone (2)	40 points	Playoff	(Republic of Ireland) Eamonn Darcy	Fulford
1990	(Zimbabwe) Tony Johnstone	50 points	2 points	(England) Malcolm MacKenzie	Fulford
1989	(South Africa) Hugh Baiocchi	156 points	2 points	(South Africa) John Bland (South Africa) Jeff Hawkes	St Pierre
