= David Feherty =

Irish professional golfer, broadcaster, writer (born 1958)

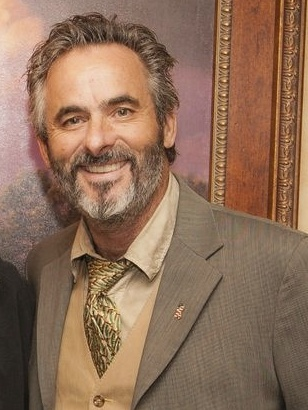
- Feherty in 2013

Personal information
- Full name: David William Feherty
- Nationality: Northern Ireland
- Born: 13 August 1958 (age 68) Bangor, County Down, Northern Ireland
- Height: 5 ft 10 in (1.78 m)
- Spouse: Anita

Career
- Sport: Golf
- Turned professional: 1976
- Former tours: PGA Tour; European Tour; Southern Africa Tour
- Professional wins: 11
- Highest ranking: 33 (16 February 1992)

Number of wins by tour
- European Tour: 5
- Sunshine Tour: 3
- Other: 3

Best results in major championships
- Masters Tournament: T52: 1992
- PGA Championship: T7: 1991
- U.S. Open: CUT: 1992
- The Open Championship: T4: 1994

David William Feherty (born 13 August 1958) is a Northern Irish-born former professional golfer and current golf broadcaster. As a touring professional he won five European Tour events, made the top 10 of the Open Championship twice (1989 and 1994), and played on Europe's 1991 Ryder Cup team. Late in his career he joined the PGA Tour. Since retiring, he has worked as a television personality; from 1997 through 2015 Feherty served as an on-course reporter for the PGA Tour on CBS. In 2011, he introduced a self-titled interview series on the Golf Channel and subsequently joined NBC Sports full-time in 2016. In July 2022, it was announced that Feherty would depart NBC and become an analyst for LIV Golf.

== Golf career ==
Feherty turned professional in 1976 and spent most of his playing career in Europe, where he won five times and finished in the top ten twice in the European Tour's Order of Merit, placing tenth in 1989 and eighth in 1990. He spent 1994 and 1995 playing mainly on the PGA Tour in the U.S., and the best result on the tour was a second-place finish at the 1994 New England Classic. His combined career earnings exceeded $3 million. Feherty represented Ireland in international competition and captained the victorious 1990 Alfred Dunhill Cup team. Feherty played for Europe on the 1991 Ryder Cup team.

== Personal life ==
Feherty was born in Bangor, County Down, Northern Ireland. He lives with his second wife Anita and their five children in Dallas, Texas. They have one daughter, Erin, born in 1998. Anita Feherty has two sons from a former marriage. Until 1995 he was married to Caroline Feherty, a South African beauty queen. They have two sons.

Feherty has had a long struggle with depression and alcoholism,—which he publicly addressed in 2006—however these symptoms, in addition to racing thoughts and insomnia, proved to be part of a Bipolar disorder diagnosis he received in 2011. In an interview with Golf Magazine about his problems, Feherty said: "I used alcohol to mask my inner demons". The outspoken columnist then took a shot at actor and noted Scientologist Tom Cruise, who has said that therapy and drugs are useless and that depression can be cured by physical exercise: "Actually, some sort of exercise would have helped me. If I kicked the shit out of Tom Cruise, I'd feel a lot better about myself." Along with George Lopez, Feherty hosted the Lopez-Feherty Foundation Anti-Pro-Am in November 2005.

In 2008, Feherty was hit by a truck while cycling. He suffered three broken ribs, which punctured his lung. He was hospitalised for a few days with a tube in his chest. He resumed his broadcast duties at the 2008 Masters Tournament.

Feherty became a naturalised citizen of the United States on 23 February 2010.

In 2012, Feherty was awarded the third-highest honor within the Department of the Army Civilian Awards, the Outstanding Civilian Service Award, for substantial contributions to the U.S. Army community through his work with the Troops First Foundation.

On 29 July 2017, Feherty's oldest son, Shey, died after a drug overdose on his 29th birthday.

Feherty describes himself as a "diehard atheist".

== Media career ==
In 1997, Feherty retired from the tours and joined CBS Sports as an on-course reporter and golf analyst. Feherty is a contributor to Golf Magazine and has his own column in the back of the magazine called Sidespin. He is also the New York Times and Booksense best-selling author of four books, A Nasty Bit of Rough, Somewhere in Ireland a Village Is Missing an Idiot, An Idiot for All Seasons, and David Feherty's Totally Subjective History of the Ryder Cup. On 21 June 2011, Feherty premiered his own weekly primetime talk show called Feherty on the Golf Channel.

Feherty is also a co-announcer on EA Sports' Tiger Woods PGA Tour series with Jim Nantz, Gary McCord, and Bill Macatee. He is a periodic guest on Dallas' sports radio station, KTCK. He appears in advertisements for the Cobra golf company, showing off his trampolining and cheerleading skills in the advert, to show off the company's Speed drivers and woods.

In September 2005, Feherty guest-starred in the Season 6 episode of Yes, Dear ("Greg's a Mooch"). In the 18 April 2009, issue of D Magazine, Feherty was one of five writers to comment on George W. Bush's move to Dallas. In his article, Feherty uses the article to express his support of Bush and to speak on politics. Criticism was aimed at Feherty for this suggestive comment about House Speaker Nancy Pelosi and Senate Leader Harry Reid:

From my own experience visiting the troops in the Middle East, I can tell you this, though: despite how the conflict has been portrayed by our glorious media, if you gave any U.S. soldier a gun with two bullets in it, and he found himself in an elevator with Nancy Pelosi, Harry Reid, and Osama bin Laden, there's a good chance that Nancy Pelosi would get shot twice, and Harry Reid and bin Laden would be strangled to death."

Feherty made the following controversial remarks and described his politics as such: "As for me, my politics are somewhere in the middle—and then way outside both wings. I believe in the death penalty, especially for pro-lifers, child molesters, those opposed to gay marriage, and for stupid dancing in the end zone. I believe in the abolition of estate taxes and the Pickens Plan. I'd lower the legal drinking age and raise the driving age to 18 nationwide, make Kinky Friedman governor of Texas, and make all schools, public and private, start earlier with one hour of physical exercise."

CBS Sports distanced itself from Feherty's comments:

We want to be clear that this column for a Dallas magazine is an unacceptable attempt at humor and is not in any way condoned, endorsed, or approved by CBS Sports... David Feherty is an insightful and sometimes humorous commentator for CBS Sports' golf coverage...however, his attempt at humor in this instance went over the line, and his comments were clearly inappropriate. We hope he will use better judgment in the future.

On his nightly cable news television show Countdown, Keith Olbermann went as far as to say the "soon to be ex-CBS Sports golf analyst David Feherty", based on comments Feherty made in the D-magazine article, leaving the audience with the impression CBS Sports was about to let Feherty go for his remarks. About two weeks later, Feherty announced the PGA Tour's Valero Texas Open, in San Antonio for CBS.

In August 2015, Feherty left CBS following his final event with the network—The Barclays. In September 2015, it was announced that Feherty would be moving to NBC Sports and Golf Channel full-time beginning in 2016, serving a similar role as he did with CBS. The deal also included renewal for Feherty on Golf Channel, a first-look development deal with Universal Television, and the ability for the two to collaborate on other projects, including some outside of golf.

After his eponymous TV show's 10th season, the program was canceled in January 2021.

In July 2022, it was announced that Feherty would leave NBC Sports and join the broadcast team at LIV Golf.

== Professional wins (11) ==
=== European Tour wins (5) ===
No.	Date	Tournament	Winning score	Margin of victory	Runner(s)-up
1	4 May 1986	Italian Open	−10 (69-67-66-68=270)	Playoff	(Northern Ireland) Ronan Rafferty
2	24 Aug 1986	Bell's Scottish Open	−14 (69-68-66-67=270)	Playoff	(Australia) Ian Baker-Finch, (Republic of Ireland) Christy O'Connor Jnr
3	15 Oct 1989	BMW International Open	−19 (62-66-68-73=269)	5 strokes	(United States) Fred Couples
4	5 May 1991	Credit Lyonnais Cannes Open	−13 (69-68-69-69=275)	3 strokes	(Australia) Craig Parry
5	25 Oct 1992	Iberia Madrid Open	−16 (71-65-69-67=272)	4 strokes	(Zimbabwe) Mark McNulty

European Tour playoff record (2–1)

No.	Year	Tournament	Opponent(s)	Result
1	1986	Italian Open	(Northern Ireland) Ronan Rafferty	Won with birdie on second extra hole
2	1986	Bell's Scottish Open	(Australia) Ian Baker-Finch, (Republic of Ireland) Christy O'Connor Jnr	Won with birdie on second extra hole
3	1990	BMW International Open	(United States) Paul Azinger	Lost to birdie on first extra hole

=== Southern Africa Tour wins (3) ===
No.	Date	Tournament	Winning score	Margin of victory	Runner(s)-up
1	26 Feb 1984	ICL International	−17 (67-69-66-69=271)	1 stroke	(South Africa) Gavan Levenson, (Zimbabwe) Nick Price
2	23 Jan 1988	Lexington PGA Championship	−13 (69-65-66-67=267)	1 stroke	(Republic of Ireland) Eamonn Darcy
3	1 Feb 1992	Bell's Cup	−12 (72-66-70-68=276)	1 stroke	(Zimbabwe) Mark McNulty

=== Other wins (3) ===
- 1980 Irish PGA Championship
- 1982 Irish PGA Championship
- 1989 Ulster Professional Championship

== Results in major championships ==
Tournament	1979	1980	1981	1982	1983	1984	1985	1986	1987	1988	1989
Masters Tournament											
U.S. Open											
The Open Championship	CUT			CUT				CUT	T26		T6
PGA Championship											

Tournament	1990	1991	1992	1993	1994	1995	1996
Masters Tournament			T52				
U.S. Open			CUT				
The Open Championship	T68	CUT	T55	CUT	T4	T31	CUT
PGA Championship		T7	CUT				

Top 10
Did not play

CUT = missed the half-way cut (3rd round cut in 1979 Open Championship)
"T" = tied

=== Summary ===
Tournament	Wins	2nd	3rd	Top-5	Top-10	Top-25	Events	Cuts made
Masters Tournament	0	0	0	0	0	0	1	1
U.S. Open	0	0	0	0	0	0	1	0
The Open Championship	0	0	0	1	2	2	12	6
PGA Championship	0	0	0	0	1	1	2	1
Totals	0	0	0	1	3	3	16	8

- Most consecutive cuts made – 3 (1987 Open Championship – 1990 Open Championship)
- Longest streak of top-10s – 1 (three times)

== Results in The Players Championship ==
Tournament	1995
The Players Championship	CUT

CUT = missed the halfway cut

== Team appearances ==
- Dunhill Cup (representing Ireland): 1985, 1986, 1990 (winners), 1991, 1993
- Four Tours World Championship (representing Europe): 1990, 1991 (winners)
- World Cup (representing Ireland): 1990
- Ryder Cup (representing Europe): 1991
  - Record: 3 matches, 1.5 points (50% Point Percentage)
  - All Formats (W–L–H): 1–1–1 = 1.5pts
    - Singles: 1–0–0 = 1pt
    - Foursomes: 0–1–0 = 0pts
    - Fourballs: 0–0–1 = 0.5pt

== See also ==
- 1993 PGA Tour Qualifying School graduates
