= John Player Trophy =

European golf competition

Tournament information
- Location: Bognor Regis, West Sussex, England
- Established: 1970
- Course: Bognor Regis Golf Club
- Par: 70
- Tour: European Tour
- Format: Stroke play
- Prize fund: £8,000
- Month played: May
- Final year: 1972

Tournament record score
- Aggregate: 286 Ross Whitehead (1972)
- To par: +6 as above

Final champion
- (England) Ross Whitehead
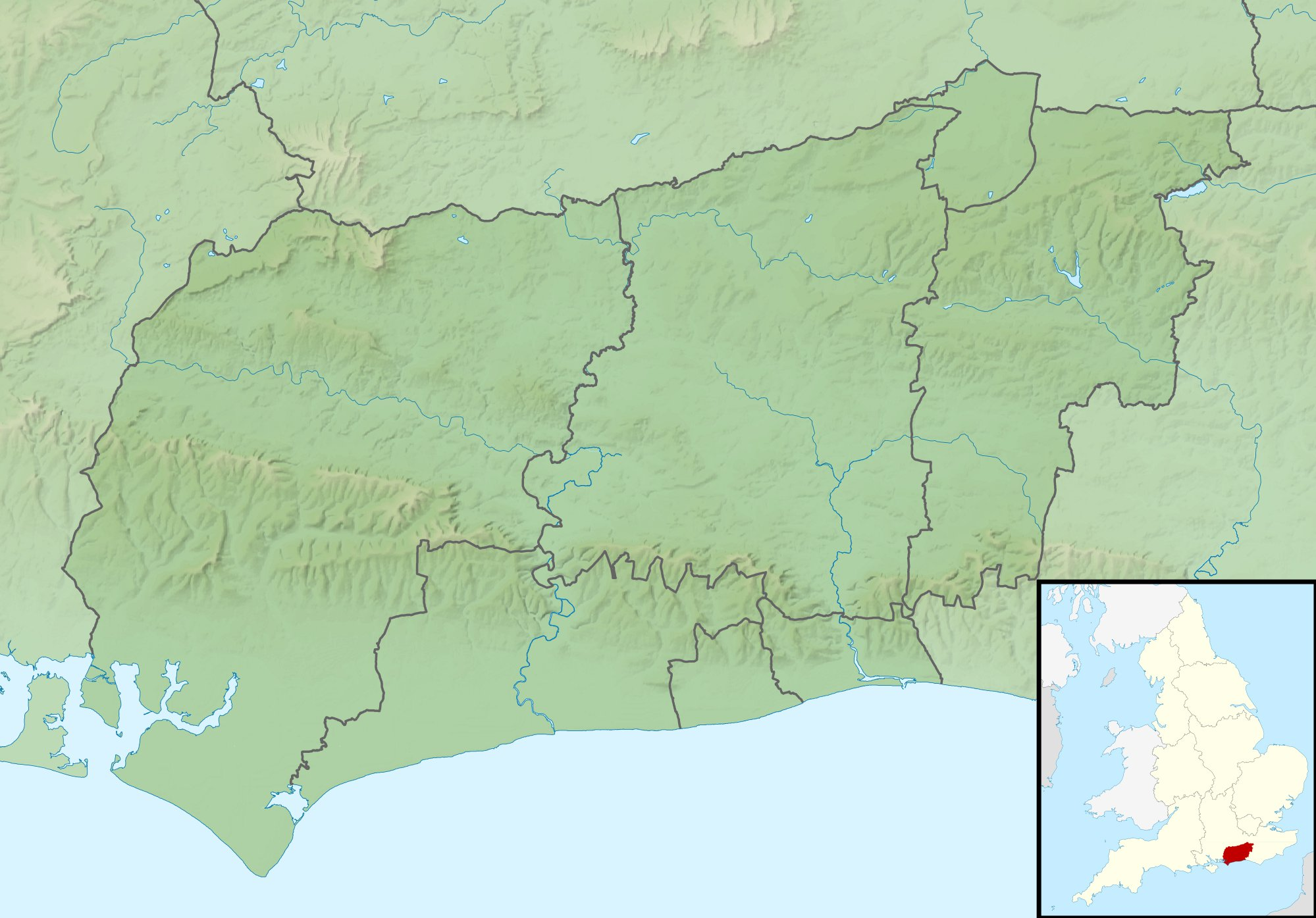
- Location in England Location in West Sussex

The John Player Trophy was a golf tournament on the European Tour that was played in England. It was played twice. The first event in 1970 at Notts Golf Club in Nottinghamshire was the 36-hole qualifying event for the John Player Classic. In 1972, at Bognor Regis Golf Club in West Sussex, it was run as a separate tournament.

== Winners ==
Year	Winner	Score	To par	Margin of victory	Runners-up	Winner's share (£)	Venue	Ref.
1972	(England) Ross Whitehead	286	+6	1 stroke	(England) Peter Butler (Northern Ireland) Vince Hood	1,500	Bognor Regis	
1971: No tournament
1970	(England) Clive Clark	141	−3	2 strokes	(England) Roger Fidler (England) Mike Ingham (England) Bill Large	750	Notts	
