= 1966 Piccadilly World Match Play Championship =

Coordinates: 51°23′48″N 0°35′45″W

Tournament information
- Dates: 6–8 October 1966
- Location: Virginia Water, Surrey, England
- Course(s): West Course, Wentworth
- Format: Match play – 36 holes

Statistics
- Par: 74
- Length: 6,997 yards (6,398 m)
- Field: 8 players
- Prize fund: £16,000
- Winner's share: £5,000

Champion
- (South Africa) Gary Player
- def. Jack Nicklaus 6 & 4

The 1966 Piccadilly World Match Play Championship was the third World Match Play Championship. It was played from Thursday 6 to Saturday 8 October on the West Course at Wentworth. Eight players competed in a straight knock-out competition, with each match contested over 36 holes. The champion received £5,000 out of a total prize fund of £16,000. Gary Player defeated Jack Nicklaus 6 & 4 in the final to win the tournament for the second successive year.

The first semi-final was even throughout. With Gary Player dormie two, both he and Arnold Palmer played badly at the 17th and halved the hole in 6 to give Player a 2&1 win. In the second semi-final Jack Nicklaus was 6 up against Bill Casper at lunch. Casper won the 5th, 6th, 8th and 9th in the afternoon to reduce the gap to two holes. A birdie by Casper at the 16th reduced the lead to one hole but Nicklaus hit a one iron to 12 feet at the 17th to secure a 2 & 1 victory.

In the final, Nicklaus drove poorly at the 17th and 18th to give Player a four-hole lead at lunch. The match finished at the 13th hole in the afternoon after Nicklaus again got into trouble off the tee. The final is best remembered for an incident between Nicklaus and the referee Tony Duncan. At the 9th hole of the first round, Nicklaus drove his ball into a ditch near an out of bounds. Nicklaus dropped out of the ditch under a penalty of one stroke and then claimed that an advertising sign about 50 yards ahead was in his line of sight and claimed relief. Duncan decided that the sign was not in a direct line between ball and pin and refused to allow a free drop. As they walked to the next tee Nicklaus criticised the decision. Duncan then offered to stand down as referee, an offer which was accepted and so he was replaced by Gerald Micklem. Nicklaus later wrote an open letter to the American magazine Golf World outlining his case. The magazine published the letter and a reply from Duncan.

As in previous years, the match play championship was preceded by the Piccadilly Tournament, a 72-hole stroke play competition, which was played on the East Course on 4 and 5 October. The winner was Bernard Hunt who won £750.

== Course ==
Hole	1	2	3	4	5	6	7	8	9	Out	10	11	12	13	14	15	16	17	18	In	Total
Yards	476	157	457	497	192	347	403	400	460	3,389	190	408	480	437	183	480	380	555	495	3,608	6,997
Par	5	3	4	5	3	4	4	4	4	36	3	4	5	4	3	5	4	5	5	38	74

== Scores ==
Quarter-finals; 6 October
(South Africa) Gary Player	1 up
(England) Neil Coles
(United States) Arnold Palmer	10 & 8
(Argentina) Roberto De Vicenzo
(United States) Billy Casper	3 & 2
(Australia) Peter Thomson
(United States) Jack Nicklaus	6 & 5
(Wales) Dave Thomas

Semi-finals; 7 October
(South Africa) Gary Player	2 & 1
(United States) Arnold Palmer
(United States) Billy Casper
(United States) Jack Nicklaus	2 & 1

Final; 8 October
(South Africa) Gary Player	6 & 4
(United States) Jack Nicklaus

== Prize money ==
The winner received £5,000, the runner-up £3,000, the losing semi-finalists £2,000 and the first round losers £1,000, making a total prize fund of £16,000.
