= 1967 Piccadilly World Match Play Championship =

Coordinates: 51°23′48″N 0°35′45″W

Tournament information
- Dates: 12–14 October 1967
- Location: Virginia Water, Surrey, England
- Course(s): West Course, Wentworth
- Format: Match play – 36 holes

Statistics
- Par: 74
- Length: 6,997 yards (6,398 m)
- Field: 8 players
- Prize fund: £16,000
- Winner's share: £5,000

Champion
- (United States) Arnold Palmer
- def. Peter Thomson 1 up

The 1967 Piccadilly World Match Play Championship was the fourth World Match Play Championship. It was played from Thursday 12 to Saturday 14 October on the West Course at Wentworth. Eight players competed in a straight knock-out competition, with each match contested over 36 holes. The champion received £5,000 out of a total prize fund of £16,000. In the final Arnold Palmer defeated Peter Thomson at the 36th hole to win the tournament for the second time.

Gary Player, the winner for the previous two years, was taken to the 39th hole by Gay Brewer in the opening round. Brewer was three up at lunch but Player has leveled the match by the 12th hole of the afternoon. Player then holed an eagle putt from 85 feet at the 17th to take the lead. At the last, Brewer holed from 12 feet for a birdie to level the match again. At the third extra hole, Player noticed that the green staff had moved the hole in preparation for the next day. He objected and the referee, Michael Bonallack, agreed to replace the hole in its original position. With no green staff available a penknife was used to cut out the hole. Brewer's second shot had finished in a green-side bunker but he came out 18 feet past the hole and three-putted to give Player the victory.

Player was finally beaten by Peter Thomson in the semi-final. Thomson led by three holes at lunch and led until Player halved the match with an eagle three at the 15th. Thomson birdied the 16th to take the lead again and the match finished when Player hooked his tee shot out of bounds at the 17th.

In the final, Thomson was three up over Arnold Palmer after six holes but the match was level when the players went to lunch. The match was still all square after 27 holes. Palmer took the lead with a birdie at the 10th and extended his lead to three holes by winning the 12th and 13th holes. Thomson reduced the lead to one by winning the 14th and 15th but Palmer holed from 15 feet to halve the 16th. The 17th was halved but Thomson was unable to get the birdie he needed at the last.

As in previous years, the match play championship was preceded by the Piccadilly Tournament, a 72-hole stroke play competition, which was played on the East Course on 10 and 11 October. The winner was Peter Butler who won £750. Because there were no British golfers in the main event, there had been talk of a boycott of this event by some of the British golfers. In the end the PGA issued a statement and the boycott came to nothing.

== Course ==
| Hole | 1 | 2 | 3 | 4 | 5 | 6 | 7 | 8 | 9 | Out | 10 | 11 | 12 | 13 | 14 | 15 | 16 | 17 | 18 | In | Total |
|---|---|---|---|---|---|---|---|---|---|---|---|---|---|---|---|---|---|---|---|---|---|
| Yards | 476 | 157 | 457 | 497 | 192 | 347 | 403 | 400 | 460 | 3,389 | 190 | 408 | 480 | 437 | 183 | 480 | 380 | 555 | 495 | 3,608 | 6,997 |
| Par | 5 | 3 | 4 | 5 | 3 | 4 | 4 | 4 | 4 | 36 | 3 | 4 | 5 | 4 | 3 | 5 | 4 | 5 | 5 | 38 | 74 |

== Scores ==
Quarter-finals; 12 October
(South Africa) Gary Player | 39 h
(United States) Gay Brewer
(Australia) Peter Thomson | 1 up
(Argentina) Roberto De Vicenzo
(United States) Arnold Palmer | 5 & 4
(Canada) George Knudson
(United States) Billy Casper | 9 & 8
(Australia) Bruce Devlin

Semi-finals; 13 October
(South Africa) Gary Player
(Australia) Peter Thomson | 2 & 1
(United States) Arnold Palmer | 3 & 2
(United States) Billy Casper

Final; 14 October
(Australia) Peter Thomson
(United States) Arnold Palmer | 1 up

== Prize money ==
The winner received £5,000, the runner-up £3,000, the losing semi-finalists £2,000 and the first round losers £1,000, making a total prize fund of £16,000.
