= Manuel Ballesteros =

Spanish professional golfer

Personal information
- Full name: Manuel Ballesteros Sota
- Nationality: Spain
- Born: 22 June 1949 (age 77) Pedreña, Cantabria
- Height: 1.73 m (5 ft 8 in)
- Weight: 80 kg (180 lb; 13 st)

Career
- Sport: Golf
- Turned professional: 1967
- Former tours: European Tour; European Seniors Tour
- Professional wins: 3

Number of wins by tour
- European Tour: 1
- Other: 2

Best results in major championships
- Masters Tournament: DNP
- PGA Championship: DNP
- U.S. Open: DNP
- The Open Championship: T44: 1978

Manuel Ballesteros Sota (born 22 June 1949) is a Spanish professional golfer. He is best known as a European Tour champion as well as being the former manager and brother of Seve Ballesteros.

== Early life ==
Ballesteros was born in the summer of 1949 in Pedreña, Spain. He learned to play golf at Real Club de Golf de Pedre in his hometown.

== Professional career ==
Ballesteros turned pro in 1967, at the age of 18. He had an early success, winning the Open Costa Vasca in September 1968, two strokes ahead of his uncle Ramón Sota. The event was played at Biarritz Golf Club in Biarritz, France, just across the border from Spain. Shortly after the victory, Ballesteros left professional golf for two years to perform national service for his country. He returned to professional golf in the early 1970s. In 1971 he was runner-up in the Swiss Open, a stroke behind England's Peter Townsend. He held the lead entering the final round but came back with a final round 73. The following year the European Tour was created which Ballesteros joined. For the first two seasons he played very well, recording multiple top-10s each season and finishing in the top 40 of the Order of Merit.

The 1974 season was much weaker. Manuel missed the cut in 11 of his first 12 events and was in serious danger of losing his card going into the final event of the year. With his back again the wall, at the El Paraiso Open in Marbella, Spain, he played excellently, finishing regulation tied with England's Peter Oosterhuis. The Englishman would birdie the first playoff hole to win but Ballesteros would maintain status on the European Tour.

Early in the 1974 season, his younger brother Seve turned professional. Witnessing Seve's great talents, Manuel decided to work full-time as Seve's manager and occasional caddie. Manuel stated later in life, "I had already been playing tournaments for seven years in Europe so I did everything for him, booked his air tickets, accommodation, everything off the course, so that nobody would bother him. All he needed to concentrate on was practice, practice, practice and playing, playing, playing."

Despite working for his brother full-time, Ballesteros still played on the European Tour part-time and performed relatively well. Between 1975 and 1980 he finished at least 41st place on the Order of Merit for all but one year.

During the early 1980s, however, his career began to wind down. He finished well outside of the top 50 of the Order of Merit during the 1981 and 1982 seasons. As the 1983 Timex Open approached, he hadn't recorded a top-10 in three years. The event was held at Biarritz Golf Club in Biarritz, France, the site of his only European circuit victory. Ballesteros shot −14 at the event to defeat England's Nick Faldo by two shots. It would be his only European Tour win. He would not play on the European Tour after the 1984 season.

However, later in life, Ballesteros would play on the European Seniors Tour for three seasons. His best season was 2000 when he recorded three top-10s and finished 35th on the Order of Merit.

== Personal life ==
Late in his career, Ballesteros married Olga in 1982. He has four sons with her: Sergio, Jaime, Manuel Jr., and Robert.

During his career, Ballesteros was a shareholder in his Seve's business empire, Fairway, S.A. He held 5% of the company.

After Seve died in 2011, Ballesteros attended a charity pro-am in Wentworth, England, organized by Cancer Research UK. The event was entitled Ole Seve Pro-Am and raised money for research into brain cancer. The event included major champions Justin Rose, José María Olazábal, and Retief Goosen.

== Professional wins (3) ==
=== European Tour wins (1) ===
No.	Date	Tournament	Winning score	Margin of victory	Runner-up
1	19 Jun 1983	Timex Open	−14 (67-65-66-64=262)	2 strokes	(England) Nick Faldo

European Tour playoff record (0–1)

No.	Year	Tournament	Opponent	Result
1	1974	El Paraiso Open	(England) Peter Oosterhuis	Lost to birdie on first extra hole

=== Other wins (2) ===
- 1968 Open Costa Vasca
- 1976 Spanish PGA Championship

== Results in major championships ==
Tournament	1969	1970	1971	1972	1973	1974	1975	1976	1977	1978	1979	1980	1981	1982	1983	1984	1985
The Open Championship	CUT				CUT	CUT	CUT		CUT	T44	CUT		CUT		CUT		CUT

Note: Ballesteros only played in The Open Championship.

Did not play

CUT = missed the half-way cut (3rd round cut in 1973, 1979, 1983 and 1985 Open Championships)
"T" = tied

== Team appearances ==
- Double Diamond International (representing Continental Europe): 1972, 1973
- Hennessy Cognac Cup (representing Continent of Europe): 1978, 1980, 1982
