= 1972 European Tour =

Golf tour season

1972 European Tour season
- Duration: 6 April 1972 – 22 October 1972
- Number of official events: 20
- Most wins: (New Zealand) Bob Charles (2) (Note: Jack Nicklaus also won two events, but was not a European Tour member.) (Australia) Graham Marsh (2) (Australia) Jack Newton (2)
- Order of Merit: (England) Peter Oosterhuis
- Sir Henry Cotton Rookie of the Year: (Scotland) Sam Torrance

The 1972 European Tour, titled as the 1972 PGA European Tour, was the inaugural season of the European Tour, the main professional golf tour in Europe.

== Changes for 1972 ==
There were several changes from the previous year's British PGA circuit schedule, with the inclusion of the Madrid Open, the Dutch Open and the Lancia d'Oro tournament; they joined the five national opens in continental Europe that were included in 1971. Also added were the John Player Trophy and the Sunbeam Electric Scottish Open, as well as the returning John Player Classic and Sumrie Better-Ball tournaments; lost from the calendar were the Agfa-Gevaert Tournament, the Classic International, the Daks Tournament and the Gallaher Ulster Open.

According to the United Press International, the circuit exceeded $1,000,000 in total prize money for the first time.

== Schedule ==
The following table lists official events during the 1972 season.

Date	Tournament	Host country	Purse (£)	Winner (Note: The number in brackets after each winner's name is the number of European Tour events they had won up to and including that tournament. This information is only shown for European Tour members and are inclusive of the three United States-based major championships which were included on the schedule for the first time in 1998, with earlier editions having retrospectively been recognised as official tour wins.)	Notes
9 Apr	Masters Tournament	United States	US$204,649	(United States) Jack Nicklaus (n/a)	Major championship (Note: Unofficial money event at the time, but retrospectively counted as an official win.)
15 Apr	Spanish Open	Spain	10,060	(Spain) Antonio Garrido (1)	
22 Apr	Madrid Open	Spain	10,060	(Republic of Ireland) Jimmy Kinsella (1)	
27 Apr	Piccadilly Medal	England	12,000	(England) Tommy Horton (1)	
13 May	Penfold-Bournemouth Tournament	England	8,000	(England) Peter Oosterhuis (1)	
27 May	John Player Trophy	England	8,000	(England) Ross Whitehead (1)	
10 Jun	Martini International	England	8,000	(Scotland) Brian Barnes (1)	
20 Jun	U.S. Open	United States	US$200,000	(United States) Jack Nicklaus (n/a)	Major championship
25 Jun	Carroll's International	Ireland	15,000	(Republic of Ireland) Christy O'Connor Snr (1)	
1 Jul	Sunbeam Electric Scottish Open	Scotland	10,000	(England) Neil Coles (1)	
15 Jul	The Open Championship	Scotland	50,000	(United States) Lee Trevino (n/a)	Major championship
23 Jul	French Open	France	11,020	(United States) Barry Jaeckel (1)	
30 Jul	Swiss Open	Switzerland	10,240	(Australia) Graham Marsh (1)	
6 Aug	German Open	West Germany	11,600	(Australia) Graham Marsh (2)	
6 Aug	PGA Championship	United States	US$225,000	(South Africa) Gary Player (n/a)	Major championship
13 Aug	Dutch Open	Netherlands	10,700	(Australia) Jack Newton (1)	
19 Aug	Benson & Hedges Festival of Golf	England	15,000	(Australia) Jack Newton (2)	
26 Aug	Viyella PGA Championship	England	15,000	(England) Tony Jacklin (1)	
16 Sep	Benson & Hedges Match Play Championship	England	20,000	(England) John Garner (1)	
23 Sep	W.D. & H.O. Wills Tournament	Scotland	15,000	(Australia) Peter Thomson (1)	
30 Sep	John Player Classic	Scotland	56,550	(New Zealand) Bob Charles (1)	
7 Oct	Dunlop Masters	England	15,000	(New Zealand) Bob Charles (2)	
15 Oct	Italian Open	Italy	15,000	(Scotland) Norman Wood (1)	
22 Oct	Lancia d'Oro	Italy	10,700	(Spain) José María Cañizares (1)	

=== Unofficial events ===
The following events were sanctioned by the European Tour, but did not carry official money, nor were wins official.

Date	Tournament	Host country	Purse (£)	Winner(s)	Notes
20 May	Sumrie Better-Ball	England	8,000	(England) Malcolm Gregson and (Wales) Brian Huggett	Team event
3 Jun	Coca-Cola Young Professionals' Championship	England	4,000	(England) Peter Oosterhuis	
2 Sep	Double Diamond International	England	15,000	Team England	Team event
8 Sep	Lord Derby's Under-25 Match Play Championship	England	2,255	(Scotland) Sam Torrance	
14 Oct	Piccadilly World Match Play Championship	England	25,000	(United States) Tom Weiskopf	Limited-field event
12 Nov	World Cup	Australia	US$2,000	(Taiwan) Hsieh Min-Nan and (Taiwan) Lu Liang-Huan	Team event
12 Nov	World Cup Individual Trophy	Australia	US$1,000	(Taiwan) Hsieh Min-Nan	

== Order of Merit ==
The Order of Merit was based on tournament results during the season, calculated using a points-based system.

Position	Player	Points	Prize money (£)
1	(England) Peter Oosterhuis	1,751	18,525
2	(England) Guy Hunt	1,710	9,809
3	(Wales) Brian Huggett	1,702	10,167
4	(England) Peter Townsend	1,640	8,592
5	(Australia) Jack Newton	1,637	8,899
6	(England) John Garner	1,616	8,006
7	(England) Peter Butler	1,614	8,376
8	(Scotland) Brian Barnes	1,603	9,104
9	(England) Neil Coles	1,597	8,629
10	(England) Clive Clark	1,575	5,831

== Awards ==
Award	Winner	Ref.
Sir Henry Cotton Rookie of the Year	(Scotland) Sam Torrance	
