= Hugh Jackson (golfer) =

Irish golfer (1940–2015)

Personal information
- Full name: Hugh Jackson
- Nationality: Northern Ireland
- Born: 28 February 1940 Newtownards, County Down, Northern Ireland
- Died: 27 September 2015 (aged 75) Ballyconneely, County Galway, Republic of Ireland
- Height: 1.71 m (5 ft 7 in)
- Weight: 86 kg (190 lb; 13.5 st)

Career
- Sport: Golf
- Turned professional: 1961
- Former tour: European Seniors Tour
- Professional wins: 3

Best results in major championships
- Masters Tournament: DNP
- PGA Championship: DNP
- U.S. Open: DNP
- The Open Championship: 8th: 1970

Hugh Jackson (28 February 1940 – 27 September 2015) was a Northern Irish professional golfer. He won the Piccadilly Fourball Match Play in 1968 and the Irish PGA Championship in 1970, the same year that he finished eighth in the Open Championship. He died while playing in a Pro-Am at Connemara Golf Club.

== Golf career ==
Playing with Richard Emery, Jackson won the 1968 Piccadilly Fourball Match Play. From 1964 to 1967, a 72-hole stroke play Piccadilly Tournament competition had been played on the East Course at Wentworth prior to the Piccadilly World Match Play Championship but in 1968 this was replaced by a four-ball better-ball match play tournament. 32 pairs competed in the knock-out competition, each round over 18 holes of the East Course. The plan was to play the first round on Monday 7 October, followed by two rounds on each of the following two days. However, heavy rain on the second day meant that the third round could not be played that day and the final was delayed until Thursday 10 October, the same day as the opening round of the 1968 Piccadilly World Match Play Championship. Jackson and Emery beat Neil Coles and Bryon Hutchinson 2&1 in the final and won £500 each out of the total prize money was £4,000.

He played for Ireland in the 1970 and 1971 World Cup, playing with Jimmy Martin in 1970 and Christy O'Connor Snr in 1971.

== Tournament wins ==
this list may be incomplete

- 1968 Irish Dunlop Tournament, Piccadilly Fourball Match Play (with Richard Emery)
- 1970 Irish PGA Championship

== Results in major championships ==
| Tournament | 1969 | 1970 | 1971 | 1972 | 1973 | 1974 | 1975 | 1976 | 1977 |
|---|---|---|---|---|---|---|---|---|---|
| The Open Championship | 46 | 8 | T22 | CUT | | T31 | | CUT | CUT |

Note: Jackson only played in The Open Championship.

Top 10
Did not play

CUT = missed the half-way cut
"T" indicates a tie for a place

== Team appearances ==
- World Cup (representing Ireland): 1970, 1971
- Double Diamond International (representing Ireland): 1971, 1972, 1973
