= 1974 European Tour =

Golf tour season

1974 European Tour season
- Duration: 10 April 1974 – 26 October 1974
- Number of official events: 21 (Note: One further tournament was scheduled but was cancelled.)
- Most wins: (England) Maurice Bembridge (3) (England) Peter Oosterhuis (3)
- Order of Merit: (England) Peter Oosterhuis
- Sir Henry Cotton Rookie of the Year: (England) Carl Mason

The 1974 European Tour, titled as the 1974 PGA European Tour, was the third season of the European Tour, the main professional golf tour in Europe since its inaugural season in 1972.

== Changes for 1974 ==
There were several changes from the previous season, with the addition of the Double Diamond Strokeplay, the El Paraiso Open and the non-counting Ibergolf Trophy to conclude the season; and the loss of the Scottish Open. The John Player Classic was scheduled for late September, but ultimately cancelled due to a clash of dates with the PGA Tour's Kaiser International Open Invitational.

== Schedule ==
The following table lists official events during the 1974 season.

Date	Tournament	Host country	Purse (£)	Winner (Note: The number in brackets after each winner's name is the number of European Tour events they had won up to and including that tournament. This information is only shown for European Tour members and are inclusive of the three United States-based major championships which were included on the schedule for the first time in 1998, with earlier editions having retrospectively been recognised as official tour wins.)	Notes
13 Apr	Portuguese Open	Portugal	15,000	(Wales) Brian Huggett (1)	
14 Apr	Masters Tournament	United States	US$229,549	(South Africa) Gary Player (n/a)	Major championship (Note: Unofficial money event at the time, but retrospectively counted as an official win.)
20 Apr	Spanish Open	Spain	26,590	(United States) Jerry Heard (1)	
27 Apr	Madrid Open	Spain	15,000	(Spain) Manuel Piñero (1)	
5 May	French Open	France	15,650	(England) Peter Oosterhuis (5)	
11 May	Penfold Tournament	England	12,000	(England) Tommy Horton (2)	
25 May	Piccadilly Medal	England	15,000	(England) Maurice Bembridge (2)	
8 Jun	Martini International	England	12,000	(Australia) Stewart Ginn (1)	
16 Jun	U.S. Open	United States	US$219,900	(United States) Hale Irwin (n/a)	Major championship
23 Jun	Carroll's Celebration International	Ireland	20,325	(Scotland) Bernard Gallacher (1)	
13 Jul	The Open Championship	England	50,000	(South Africa) Gary Player (n/a)	Major championship
21 Jul	Scandinavian Enterprise Open	Sweden	30,000	(England) Tony Jacklin (4)	
27 Jul	Swiss Open	Switzerland	20,700	(New Zealand) Bob Charles (4)	
4 Aug	German Open	West Germany	17,500	(New Zealand) Simon Owen (1)	
11 Aug	Dutch Open	Netherlands	19,000	(Scotland) Brian Barnes (2)	
11 Aug	PGA Championship	United States	US$225,000	(United States) Lee Trevino (n/a)	Major championship
17 Aug	Benson & Hedges Festival of Golf	England	25,000	(Belgium) Philippe Toussaint (1)	
21 Aug	Double Diamond Strokeplay	Scotland	10,000	(England) Maurice Bembridge (3)	New tournament
31 Aug	Viyella PGA Championship	England	25,000	(England) Maurice Bembridge (4)	
15 Sep	Benson & Hedges Match Play Championship	Scotland	20,000	(Australia) Jack Newton (3)	
21 Sep	W.D. & H.O. Wills Tournament	England	25,000	(England) Neil Coles (4)	
~~28 Sep~~	John Player Classic	England	–	Cancelled	
5 Oct	Dunlop Masters	Wales	20,000	(Scotland) Bernard Gallacher (2)	
20 Oct	Italian Open	Italy	24,000	(England) Peter Oosterhuis (6)	
26 Oct	El Paraiso Open	Spain	20,000	(England) Peter Oosterhuis (7)	

=== Unofficial events ===
The following events were sanctioned by the European Tour, but did not carry official money, nor were wins official.

Date	Tournament	Host country	Purse (£)	Winner(s)	Notes
18 May	Sumrie-Bournemouth Better-Ball	England	12,000	(England) Clive Clark and (England) Peter Butler	Team event
15 Jun	Coca-Cola Young Professionals' Championship	England	10,000	(South Africa) Dale Hayes	
8 Aug	Lord Derby's Young Professionals' Tournament	England	5,000	(England) Richard Jewell	
24 Aug	Double Diamond International	Scotland	n/a	Team England	Team event
12 Oct	Piccadilly World Match Play Championship	England	30,000	(United States) Hale Irwin	Limited-field event
3 Nov	Sotogrande Match	Spain	16,000	Team GB&I	New team event
10 Nov	European Ibergolf Trophy	Spain	13,620	(South Africa) Gary Player	New tournament
24 Nov	World Cup	Venezuela	US$2,000	(South Africa) Bobby Cole and (South Africa) Dale Hayes	Team event
24 Nov	World Cup Individual Trophy	Venezuela	US$1,000	(South Africa) Bobby Cole	

== Order of Merit ==
The Order of Merit was based on tournament results during the season, calculated using a points-based system.

Position	Player	Points	Prize money (£)
1	(England) Peter Oosterhuis	2,965	32,127
2	(South Africa) Dale Hayes	2,379	18,396
3	(Scotland) Bernard Gallacher	2,148	18,515
4	(Scotland) Brian Barnes	2,111	14,380
5	(England) Neil Coles	2,080	13,961
6	(Argentina) Vicente Fernández	2,061	7,819
7	(England) Tony Jacklin	2,033	19,547
8	(Wales) Brian Huggett	2,032	12,373
9	(England) Peter Townsend	1,980	15,828
10	(England) Tommy Horton	1,902	11,343

== Awards ==
Award	Winner	Ref.
Sir Henry Cotton Rookie of the Year	(England) Carl Mason	
