= 1965 Piccadilly World Match Play Championship =

Second World Match Play Championship (golf)

Coordinates: 51°23′48″N 0°35′45″W

Tournament information
- Dates: 14–16 October 1965
- Location: Virginia Water, Surrey, England
- Course: West Course, Wentworth
- Format: Match play – 36 holes

Statistics
- Par: 74
- Length: 6,997 yards (6,398 m)
- Field: 8 players
- Prize fund: £16,000
- Winner's share: £5,000

Champion
- (South Africa) Gary Player
- def. Peter Thomson 3 & 2

The 1965 Piccadilly World Match Play Championship was the second World Match Play Championship. It was played from Thursday 14 to Saturday 16 October on the West Course at Wentworth. Eight players competed in a straight knock-out competition, with each match contested over 36 holes. The champion received £5,000 out of a total prize fund of £16,000. Gary Player defeated Peter Thomson 3 & 2 in the final to win the tournament.

In the first round of his semi-final, Gary Player was 1 up after 10 holes but then lost seven holes in succession to Tony Lema from the 11th to the 17th. He needed a 10-foot putt at the 18th to halve that hole but was 6 down at lunch. He then lost the first hole in the afternoon to go 7 down to Lema. Player birdied the 2nd and 3rd holes and eventually won the 18th to tie the match, winning the match at the 37th hole.

In the final, Thomson was 1 up at lunch. Player squared the match at the 2nd hole and then went two up after winning the 7th and 8th. Thomson eagled the 12th to reduce the gap to one hole but Player birdied the 15th and 16th to win 3 & 2.

As in 1964, the match play championship was preceded by the Piccadilly Tournament, a 72-hole stroke play competition, which was played on the East Course on 11 and 12 October. The winner was Peter Butler who won £750.

== Course ==
Hole	1	2	3	4	5	6	7	8	9	Out	10	11	12	13	14	15	16	17	18	In	Total
Yards	476	157	457	497	192	347	403	400	460	3,389	190	408	480	437	183	480	380	555	495	3,608	6,997
Par	5	3	4	5	3	4	4	4	4	36	3	4	5	4	3	5	4	5	5	38	74

== Scores ==
Quarter-finals; 14 October
(United States) Arnold Palmer	3 & 2
(Australia) Kel Nagle
(Australia) Peter Thomson	37 h
(Republic of Ireland) Christy O'Connor
(South Africa) Gary Player	5 & 4
(England) Neil Coles
(United States) Tony Lema	5 & 4
(England) Peter Alliss

Semi-finals; 15 October
(United States) Arnold Palmer
(Australia) Peter Thomson	1 up
(South Africa) Gary Player	37 h
(United States) Tony Lema

Final; 16 October
(Australia) Peter Thomson
(South Africa) Gary Player	3 & 2

The match between Peter Thomson and Christy O'Connor was completed on 15 October having been all square after 36 holes when it became too dark to continue.

== Prize money ==
The winner received £5,000, the runner-up £3,000, the losing semi-finalists £2,000 and the first round losers £1,000, making a total prize fund of £16,000.
