= 1973 Piccadilly World Match Play Championship =

Coordinates: 51°23′48″N 0°35′45″W

Tournament information
- Dates: 11–13 October 1973
- Location: Virginia Water, Surrey, England
- Course(s): West Course, Wentworth
- Format: Match play – 36 holes

Statistics
- Par: 74
- Length: 6,997 yards (6,398 m)
- Field: 8 players
- Prize fund: £30,000
- Winner's share: £10,000

Champion
- (South Africa) Gary Player
- def. Graham Marsh after 40 holes

The 1973 Piccadilly World Match Play Championship was the tenth World Match Play Championship. It was played from Thursday 11 to Saturday 13 October on the West Course at Wentworth. Eight players competed in a straight knock-out competition, with each match contested over 36 holes. The champion received £10,000 out of a total prize fund of £30,000. In the final, Gary Player beat Graham Marsh at the fourth extra hole to win the championship for the fifth time.

In a close final, Player holed a 7-foot birdie putt at the 36th hole to tie the match after Marsh's second shot had found a green-side bunker and he was unable to get down in two more. Player had to get up and down from bunkers at the first two extra holes to extend the match. At the fourth extra hole, he holed from 9 feet and then Marsh missed from 3 feet to give Player the victory.

== Course ==
Hole	1	2	3	4	5	6	7	8	9	Out	10	11	12	13	14	15	16	17	18	In	Total
Yards	476	157	457	497	192	347	403	400	460	3,389	190	408	480	437	183	480	380	555	495	3,608	6,997
Par	5	3	4	5	3	4	4	4	4	36	3	4	5	4	3	5	4	5	5	38	74

== Scores ==
Quarter-finals; 11 October
(United States) Tom Weiskopf	3 & 2
(United States) Lanny Wadkins
(United States) Tommy Aaron
(Australia) Graham Marsh	3 & 2
(United States) Johnny Miller	4 & 3
(England) Peter Oosterhuis
(South Africa) Gary Player	3 & 2
(England) Tony Jacklin

Semi-finals; 12 October
(United States) Tom Weiskopf
(Australia) Graham Marsh	4 & 3
(United States) Johnny Miller
(South Africa) Gary Player	3 & 2

Final; 13 October
(Australia) Graham Marsh
(South Africa) Gary Player	40 h

== Prize money ==
The winner received £10,000, the runner-up £5,000, the losing semi-finalists £3,500 and the first round losers £2,000, making a total prize fund of £30,000.
