= Tony Duncan =

Welsh cricketer and golfer

Anthony Arthur Duncan (10 December 1914 – 3 January 1998) was a Welsh golfer and cricketer. He was born in Cardiff and died in Surrey.

As a golfer, he was the losing finalist in the 1939 Amateur Championship and was the captain of the 1953 Great Britain and Ireland Walker Cup team. In the 1953 Walker Cup, Duncan was a playing member of the team but did not select himself for any matches. He was involved in an incident with Jack Nicklaus during the final of the 1966 Piccadilly World Match Play Championship for which he was the referee.

Duncan played in three first-class matches for Glamorgan in 1934 and 1935 as a righthanded batsman who scored eighteen runs with a highest score of 15*.
