= Peter Oosterhuis =

English golfer and broadcaster (1948–2024)

Personal information
- Full name: Peter Arthur Oosterhuis
- Nickname: Oosty
- Nationality: England
- Born: 3 May 1948 Lambeth, London, England
- Died: 2 May 2024 (aged 75) Charlotte, North Carolina, U.S.
- Height: 6 ft 5 in (1.96 m)
- Weight: 230 lb (100 kg; 16 st)
- Spouses: Valerie, Ruth Ann
- Children: 2

Career
- Sport: Golf
- Turned professional: 1968
- Former tours: PGA Tour; European Tour; Southern Africa Tour
- Professional wins: 28

Number of wins by tour
- PGA Tour: 1
- European Tour: 7
- Sunshine Tour: 3
- Other: 17

Best results in major championships
- Masters Tournament: T3: 1973
- PGA Championship: T22: 1982
- U.S. Open: T7: 1975
- The Open Championship: 2nd/T2: 1974, 1982

Achievements and awards
- Sir Henry Cotton Rookie of the Year: 1969
- Harry Vardon Trophy/ European Tour Order of Merit winner: 1971, 1972, 1973, 1974

Peter Arthur Oosterhuis (3 May 1948 – 2 May 2024) was an English professional golfer and broadcaster. He played on the European circuit from 1969 to 1974, winning 10 tournaments and taking the Harry Vardon Trophy for heading the Order of Merit for four consecutive seasons from 1971 to 1974. From 1975 he played on the PGA Tour, winning the Canadian Open in 1981. Oosterhuis was twice runner-up in the Open Championship, in 1974 and 1982. Later he became a golf analyst on TV, initially in Europe and then in the United States. In 2015, he announced that he had Alzheimer's disease.

== Amateur career ==
Oosterhuis won the 1966 Berkshire Trophy by a stroke from Michael Bonallack, after a final round 67 which included nine 3s in 11 holes, with seven 3s in succession. Later in 1966 Oosterhuis won the British Youths Open Amateur Championship by four strokes. In 1968 he was a runner-up in the Golf Illustrated Gold Vase behind Michael Bonallack and tied with Ted Dexter.

Oosterhuis was a regular competitor for English and British teams at the boys (under-18) and youth (under-21) levels. He made his senior debut for England in the 1966 Home Internationals, then represented Great Britain in the 1967 Walker Cup. He and Ronnie Shade, playing together in the foursomes, halved one match and won the other; however, Oosterhuis lost both his singles matches. He also played in the 1968 Eisenhower Trophy where Great Britain and Ireland won the silver medal. Great Britain and Ireland led the United States by 7 strokes after three rounds, but the Americans scored 73, 73 and 75 in the final round to Great Britain and Ireland's 76, 76, and 77 to win by a stroke. Oosterhuis turned professional in November 1968.

== Professional career ==
=== European and Southern African circuits ===
Oosterhuis played in South Africa in early 1969, finishing runner-up to Bobby Cole in the Natal Open. He seemed a likely winner but dropped a shot at the 17th and then took 7 at the final hole. Later in the year, he started the British season by winning the Sunningdale Foursomes, playing with the amateur Peter Benka. He finished runner-up in the Gor-Ray Under-24 Championship and, playing with Nigel Paul, won the Whitbread professional-amateur foursomes. He was awarded the Sir Henry Cotton Rookie of the Year award.

In 1970, Oosterhuis won two age-restricted events, Lord Derby’s Under-23 Professional Tournament and the Coca-Cola Young Professionals' Championship. Later in the season he finished tied for sixth in the Open Championship, and third in the Dunlop Masters. Oosterhuis had won the General Motors Open in South Africa in February, an event which served as the South African qualifier for the Alcan Golfer of the Year Championship. In the Alcan event he finished tied for third place in that event with Neil Coles and Lee Trevino, winning £2,487.

In April 1971, Oosterhuis made his debut on the PGA Tour at the 1971 Greater Greensboro Open, the week before competing in his first Masters. The following month Oosterhuis won his first important British event, the Agfa-Gevaert Tournament, and followed this up by winning the Sunbeam Electric Tournament and the Piccadilly Medal later in the season. He played Eric Brown in the final of the Piccadilly Medal, Brown conceding the match at the 34th hole because of a wrist injury, with Oosterhuis 6 strokes ahead after 33 holes. These, together a number of other high finishes, including being runner-up in the Carroll's International and the Dunlop Masters, gave Oosterhuis the Order of Merit title with 1292.5 points, beating Neil Coles who finished just 7 points behind. In September he represented Great Britain and Ireland for the first time in the Ryder Cup in St. Louis, having finished second in the points list. In his singles matches he defeated Gene Littler and Arnold Palmer. In November he made his only appearance in the World Cup. Playing with Tony Jacklin, the pair finished tied for 6th place.

The European Tour started in 1972. Oosterhuis won the Penfold-Bournemouth Tournament, after beating Christy O'Connor Jnr in a sudden-death playoff, and the Coca-Cola Young Professionals' Championship, a non-tour event. He was runner-up in the Dutch Open, the Viyella PGA Championship and the John Player Classic. He won the Order of Merit title with 1,751 points, ahead of Guy Hunt on 1,710, although his performances in the big money events put him well ahead as the leading money winner with £18,525.

In February 1973, Oosterhuis played on the Caribbean Tour, winning the Ford Maracaibo Open and finishing runner-up in the Caracas Open and the Panama Open, before playing a number of events on the PGA Tour. In April, Oosterhuis led the Masters by three strokes after three rounds, before finishing tied for third place, two strokes behind Tommy Aaron, after a final round 74. Later in the year, Oosterhuis won three European Tour events: the Piccadilly Medal, French Open and Viyella PGA Championship. He was also runner-up in the Sunbeam Electric Scottish Open and Dutch Open. He won the Order of Merit again, with 3,440 points, 460 points ahead of Maurice Bembridge. He won £17,455 in official tour events, second behind Tony Jacklin. In September, he played in the Ryder Cup, having led the points list. As in 1971, he again played well in his singles matches, halving with Lee Trevino and beating Arnold Palmer. Oosterhuis was selected to the two-man English team for the 1973 World Cup, to be played in November in Spain. Shortly before the tournament Oosterhuis withdrew because his wife was ill.

In March and April 1974, Oosterhuis played three events on the PGA Tour, including the Masters. The week after the Masters, he was runner-up in the Monsanto Open, where he lost at the fourth hole of a sudden-death playoff to Lee Elder. It was Elder's first win on the PGA Tour. Oosterhuis won three more European Tour events in 1974: the French Open and the last two tournaments of the season, the Italian Open and El Paraiso Open. In addition he was runner-up in five other events, including the Open Championship, and was third in three more, finishing outside the top three only twice during the European Tour season. He won the Order of Merit for the fourth time, nearly 600 points ahead of second-place Dale Hayes. In November, Oosterhuis played in the 1974 PGA Tour Qualifying School in Palm Springs, California. Oosterhuis easily qualified, finishing in fourth place, three strokes behind the winner Fuzzy Zoeller.

=== PGA Tour ===
Oosterhuis made his debut on his PGA Tour rookie season at the opening event, the 1975 Phoenix Open. In the middle of the year, he recorded a second-place finish at First NBC New Orleans Open to Billy Casper. He was also in contention for the U.S. Open on the last day. He was in a tie for 4th place as he entered the final round. The leaders struggled early and Oosterhuis's even-par golf through the first 8 holes was nearly enough to catch them. However, he made four consecutive bogeys in the middle of the round to eliminate his chances. He would still finish only two back, in a tie for seventh. Oosterhuis also recorded one other top-10 in 1975. His overall record for the year was 28 starts with 24 made cuts along with 3 top-10s and 10 top-25s. Late in the year, Oosterhuis played the 1975 Ryder Cup. He again had much success at the event, defeating Johnny Miller and J. C. Snead.

Oosterhuis did not progress on this performance, however. Through the late 1970s, he would easily keep his Tour card but was not a regular contender to win events on the PGA Tour. His year-end statistics through the late 1970s are remarkably similar to his 1975 results. In 1976, he made the cut in 25 of 29 events with 3 top-10s and 11 top-25s. In 1977, he made 18 of 25 cuts with 3 top-10s and 9 top-25s, including a runner-up finish at the Canadian Open, his third and final runner-up finish on tour. In 1978, he recorded 20 made cuts in 24 events with, for the fourth straight year, 3 top-10s as well as 6 top-25s.

Oosterhuis's career in America reached its nadir in the summer of 1981. He had not recorded a top-10 in over a year. He barely kept his card the previous year, finishing #107 on the money list. He had gotten some advice, however, from former pro and instructor Bert Yancey which, in this words, "helped immensely." This work eventually paid off as he won the Canadian Open in August 1981. It would be his only PGA Tour win. He defeated Andy North, Bruce Lietzke, and Jack Nicklaus by a shot. Nicklaus had a 20-foot eagle putt on the last hole to tie but missed. He would build on this success, recording 4 top-10s and 13 top-25s in 1982, both his best ever for the PGA Tour. He would also finish runner-up at the 1982 Open Championship.

The remainder of Oosterhuis's career was not quite as successful. He would record a handful of top-10s before quitting life as a touring professional after the 1986 season. From 1987 to 1993, he was Director of Golf at Forsgate Country Club in Jamesburg, New Jersey, and at the Riviera Country Club in Pacific Palisades, California.

In 1993, Oosterhuis made a comeback, entering 13 tournaments on the European Tour, but did not make the cut in any of them.

=== Broadcasting career ===
In 1994, Oosterhuis was hired to cover the PGA Tour by Britain's Sky Sports and covered the Open Championship for the BBC in 1996 and 1997. From 1995 to 1997, he was the lead analyst for the Golf Channel's coverage of the European Tour. From 1998, Oosterhuis joined the CBS Sports announcer team.

Oosterhuis retired from broadcasting in 2015 following his announcement that he had early-onset Alzheimer's disease.

== Personal life ==
Oosterhuis was born on 3 May 1948 in London, the son of a Dutch father and an English mother. He was educated at Dulwich College. He resided in Charlotte, North Carolina, in the United States with his second wife, Ruth Ann. His son Rob is a professional golfer.

In May 2015, Oosterhuis announced that he was battling early-onset Alzheimer's disease. He died from complications of the disease at a Charlotte memory care facility on 2 May 2024 at the age of 75, a day before what would have been his 76th birthday.

== Amateur wins ==
- 1966 Berkshire Trophy, British Youths Open Amateur Championship

== Professional wins (28) ==
=== PGA Tour wins (1) ===
No.	Date	Tournament	Winning score	Margin of victory	Runners-up
1	2 Aug 1981	Canadian Open	−4 (69-69-72-70=280)	1 stroke	(United States) Bruce Lietzke, (United States) Jack Nicklaus, (United States) Andy North

PGA Tour playoff record (0–1)

No.	Year	Tournament	Opponent	Result
1	1974	Monsanto Open	(United States) Lee Elder	Lost to birdie on fourth extra hole

=== European Tour wins (7) ===
No.	Date	Tournament	Winning score	Margin of victory	Runner(s)-up
1	13 May 1972	Penfold-Bournemouth Tournament	+1 (72-70-72-71=285)	Playoff	(Republic of Ireland) Christy O'Connor Jnr
2	28 Apr 1973	Piccadilly Medal	−6 (67)	6 strokes	(South Africa) Terry Westbrook
3	3 Jun 1973	French Open	−4 (75-69-68-68=280)	1 stroke	(England) Tony Jacklin
4	25 Aug 1973	Viyella PGA Championship	−4 (69-69-70-72=280)	3 strokes	(South Africa) Dale Hayes, (Belgium) Donald Swaelens
5	5 May 1974	French Open (2)	+4 (71-72-68-73=284)	2 strokes	(England) Peter Townsend
6	20 Oct 1974	Italian Open	−2 (37-72-70-70=249) (Note: Shortened to 54/63 holes due to weather.)	2 strokes	(South Africa) Dale Hayes
7	26 Oct 1974	El Paraiso Open	−4 (69-69-74=212)	Playoff	(Spain) Manuel Ballesteros

European Tour playoff record (2–1)

No.	Year	Tournament	Opponent	Result
1	1972	Penfold-Bournemouth Tournament	(Republic of Ireland) Christy O'Connor Jnr	Won with birdie on first extra hole
2	1974	German Open	(New Zealand) Simon Owen	Lost to birdie on first extra hole
3	1974	El Paraiso Open	(Spain) Manuel Ballesteros	Won with birdie on first extra hole

=== Southern Africa Tour wins (3) ===
No.	Date	Tournament	Winning score	Margin of victory	Runner-up
1	19 Dec 1971	Rhodesian Dunlop Masters	−16 (68-67-69-68=272)	3 strokes	(South Africa) Tienie Britz
2	4 Mar 1972	Glen Anil Classic	−15 (68-66-67-72=273)	Playoff	(South Africa) Hugh Baiocchi
3	27 Jan 1973	Rothmans International Matchplay	6 and 5		(South Africa) Gary Player

Southern Africa Tour playoff record (1–1)

No.	Year	Tournament	Opponent(s)	Result
1	1971	Luyt Lager PGA Championship	(South Africa) Tienie Britz, (Rhodesia) Don Gammon	Britz won 18-hole playoff; Britz: −5 (67), Oosterhuis: −2 (70), Gammon: −1 (71)
2	1972	Glen Anil Classic	(South Africa) Hugh Baiocchi	Won with birdie on second extra hole

=== European circuit wins (3) ===
No.	Date	Tournament	Winning score	Margin of victory	Runner(s)-up	Ref
1	22 May 1971	Agfa-Gevaert Tournament	68-67-69-72=276	2 strokes	(Scotland) Brian Barnes, (Scotland) David Huish	
2	29 Jun 1971	Sunbeam Electric Tournament	67-65=132	4 strokes	(Australia) Peter Thomson	
3	14 Aug 1971	Piccadilly Medal	Conceded		(Scotland) Eric Brown	

=== South African circuit wins (3) ===
No.	Date	Tournament	Winning score	Margin of victory	Runner-up	Ref
1	14 Feb 1970	General Motors Open	70-65-75-75=285	2 strokes	(South Africa) Gary Player	
2	20 Feb 1971	Transvaal Open	70-70-67-72=279	6 strokes	(South Africa) Graham Henning	
3	6 Mar 1971	Schoeman Park Open	67-67-65-68=267	3 strokes	(South Africa) John Bland	

=== Caribbean Tour wins (1) ===
- 1973 Ford Maracaibo Open

=== Other wins (10) ===
This list may be incomplete.

- 1969 Sunningdale Foursomes (with Peter Benka), Whitbread Trophy (with Nigel Paul)
- 1970 Lord Derby’s Under-23 Professional Tournament, Coca-Cola Young Professionals' Championship
- 1971 Southern Professional Championship
- 1972 Coca-Cola Young Professionals' Championship
- 1974 Raleigh Cup (Guadalajara, Mexico)
- 1983 Spalding Invitational
- 1985 Spalding Invitational
- 1989 New Jersey PGA Championship

== Results in major championships ==
Tournament	1968	1969
Masters Tournament		
U.S. Open		
The Open Championship	CUT	CUT
PGA Championship		

Tournament	1970	1971	1972	1973	1974	1975	1976	1977	1978	1979
Masters Tournament		CUT	T38	T3	T31	CUT	T23	T46	T14	T34
U.S. Open						T7	T55	T10	T27	
The Open Championship	T6	T18	T28	T18	2	T7	T42		6	T41
PGA Championship						T40	T38		T26	

Tournament	1980	1981	1982	1983	1984	1985	1986
Masters Tournament			T24	T20	CUT		
U.S. Open			T30	T50	T25	56	69
The Open Championship	T23	CUT	T2	CUT			
PGA Championship	CUT	CUT	T22	T47	CUT		

Top 10
Did not play

CUT = missed the half-way cut (3rd round cut in 1981 Open Championship)
"T" indicates a tie for a place

Summary
Tournament	Wins	2nd	3rd	Top-5	Top-10	Top-25	Events	Cuts made
Masters Tournament	0	0	1	1	1	5	12	9
U.S. Open	0	0	0	0	2	3	9	9
The Open Championship	0	2	0	2	5	8	15	11
PGA Championship	0	0	0	0	0	1	8	5
Totals	0	2	1	3	8	17	44	34

- Most consecutive cuts made – 16 (1975 U.S. Open – 1980 Open Championship)
- Longest streak of top-10s – 2 (1975 U.S. Open – 1975 Open Championship)

== Team appearances ==
Amateur

- Boys' match v Continent of Europe (representing combined England & Scotland): 1964 (winners), 1965 (winners)
- England–Scotland boys match (representing England): 1964 (winners), 1965 (winners)
- England–Scotland youths match (representing England): 1966 (winners), 1967 (tied), 1968
- Men's Home Internationals (representing England): 1966 (winners), 1967, 1968 (winners)
- EGA Trophy (representing Great Britain & Ireland): 1967 (winners), 1968 (winners)
- Walker Cup (representing Great Britain & Ireland): 1967
- St Andrews Trophy (representing Great Britain & Ireland): 1968 (winners)
- Eisenhower Trophy (representing Great Britain & Ireland): 1968

Professional

- Ryder Cup (representing Great Britain & Ireland/Europe): 1971, 1973, 1975, 1977, 1979, 1981
- World Cup (representing England): 1971
- Double Diamond International (representing England): 1973, 1974 (winners, captain)
- Sotogrande Match: (representing Great Britain and Ireland): 1974 (winners)

== See also ==
- 1974 PGA Tour Qualifying School graduates
