= W.D. & H.O. Wills Tournament =

Tournament information
- Location: Birmingham, England
- Established: 1968
- Course: Kings Norton Golf Club
- Par: 72
- Tour: European Tour
- Format: Stroke play
- Prize fund: £25,000
- Month played: September
- Final year: 1974

Tournament record score
- Aggregate: 267 Tony Jacklin (1970)
- To par: −17 as above

Final champion
- (England) Neil Coles
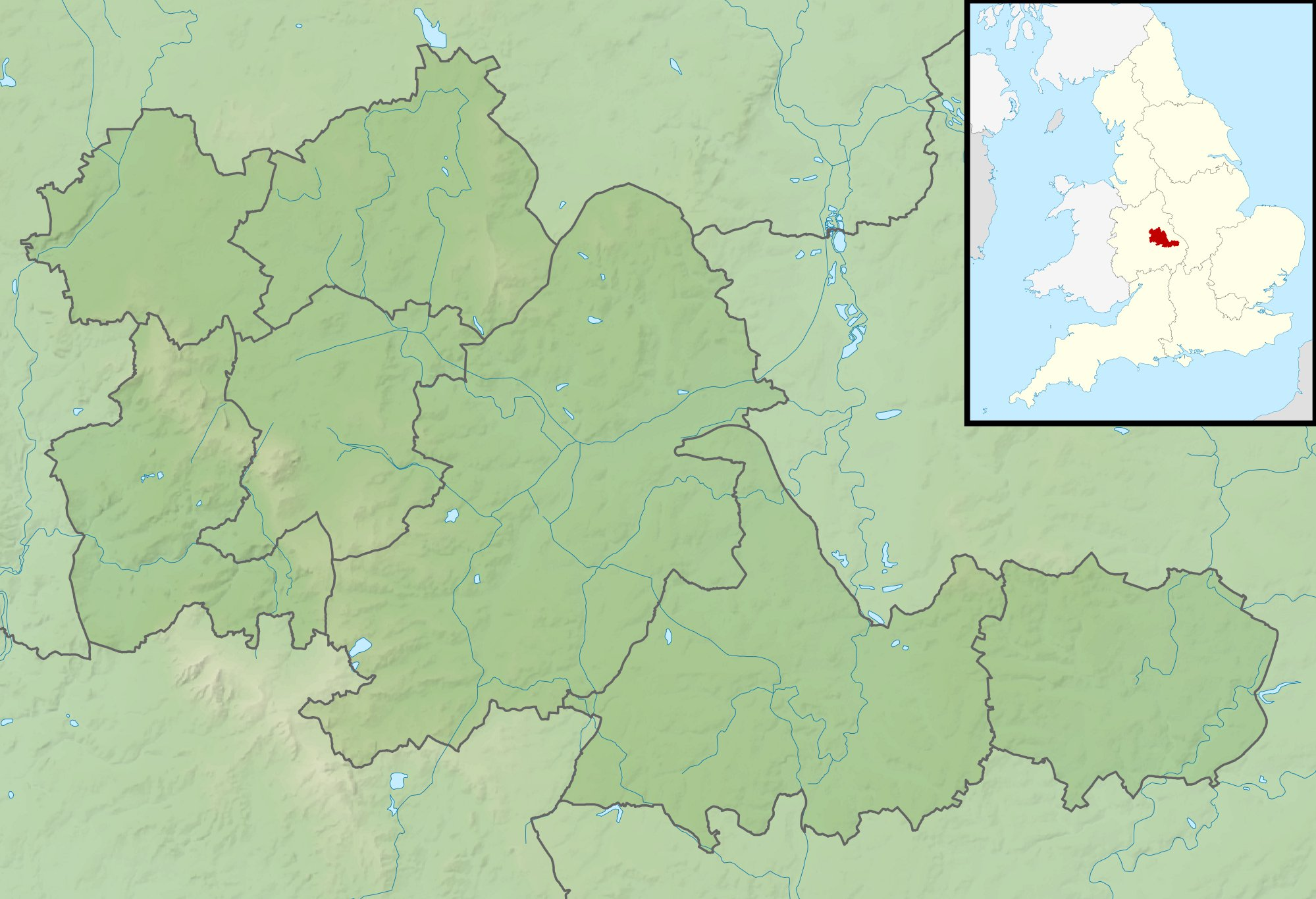
- Location in England Location in the West Midlands

The W.D. & H.O. Wills Tournament was a professional golf tournament on the British PGA tournament circuit from 1968 to 1974. Since the circuit later evolved into the European Tour, the tournament is recognised as an official European Tour event from 1972. The sponsor was tobacco company W.D. & H.O. Wills.

== Winners ==
Year	Winner	Score	To par	Margin of victory	Runner(s)-up	Winner's share (£)	Venue	Ref.
1974	(England) Neil Coles	283	−5	1 stroke	(Australia) Jack Newton	4,000	Kings Norton	
1973	(United States) Charles Coody	281	−7	1 stroke	(Australia) Jack Newton	2,250	Kings Norton	
1972	(Australia) Peter Thomson	270	−14	3 strokes	(England) Peter Butler	2,250	Dalmahoy	
1971	(England) Bernard Hunt	276	−8	4 strokes	(New Zealand) Bob Charles (England) Peter Tupling	2,000	Dalmahoy	
1970	(England) Tony Jacklin	267	−17	7 strokes	(England) Peter Townsend	2,000	Dalmahoy	
1969	(Scotland) Bernard Gallacher	275		1 stroke	(Republic of Ireland) Christy O'Connor Snr		Moor Park	
1968	(England) Peter Butler	281		2 strokes	(England) Bill Large		Pannal	
