= The Western Australian Ten Thousand =

Golf tournament in Australia

The Western Australian Ten Thousand was a golf tournament in Australia held in October 1968. The event was held at Cottesloe Golf Club in Cottesloe, Western Australia. The tournament was won by England's Peter Townsend.

The event was held a week before the Australian Open which was also held in Western Australia. This helped attract top Australian golfers like Kel Nagle and Peter Thomson. In the second round, England's Peter Townsend broke Cottelsoe's course record with a 66 (−6) to take the lead. He received "only token resistance" thereafter and defeated Australian Bill Dunk by two shots at 282 (−6). Nagle and Japan's Takashi Murakami finished a further shot back (−3, 285) in joint third.

== Winners ==
Year	Winner	Score	Margin of victory	Runner-up
1968	(England) Peter Townsend	282 (−6)	2 strokes	(Australia) Bill Dunk
