= Ross Whitehead =

English golfer (1934–1999)

Personal information
- Full name: Edmund Ross Whitehead
- Nationality: England
- Born: 19 April 1934 Surrey, England
- Died: 4 October 1999 (aged 65) Rickmansworth, Hertfordshire, England

Career
- Sport: Golf
- Turned professional: 1950
- Former tours: European Tour; European Seniors Tour
- Professional wins: 6

Number of wins by tour
- European Tour: 1
- Other: 5

Best results in major championships
- Masters Tournament: DNP
- PGA Championship: DNP
- U.S. Open: DNP
- The Open Championship: T12: 1962

Edmund Ross Whitehead (19 April 1934 – 4 October 1999) was an English professional golfer. His most successful year was 1962 when he won the Wentworth Foursomes, Sunningdale Foursomes and the Gor-Ray Cup, tied for 12th in the 1962 Open Championship and reached the final of the News of the World Match Play. His only win in a major tournament was the 1972 John Player Trophy.

== Golf career ==
While an assistant at Walton Heath Golf Club, Whitehead won the 1958 Coombe Hill Assistants' Tournament. In 1962 he moved to Banstead Downs Golf Club and won the Gor-Ray Cup, the Assistants' Championship, by 6 strokes.

In 1972, at the age of 38, he won his first major tournament, the John Player Trophy, and the first prize of £1,500.

He was joint runner-up in the 1984 Trusthouse Forte PGA Seniors Championship, 3 strokes behind Ernie Jones.

Whitehead was the Captain of the PGA from 1993 to 1995.

== Professional wins (6) ==
=== European Tour wins (1) ===
No.	Date	Tournament	Winning score	Margin of victory	Runners-up
1	27 May 1972	John Player Trophy	+6 (74-71-69-72=286)	1 stroke	(England) Peter Butler, (Northern Ireland) Vince Hood

=== Other wins (5) ===
- 1957 Sunningdale Foursomes (with Brian Huggett)
- 1958 Coombe Hill Assistants' Tournament
- 1962 Wentworth Foursomes (with Martin Christmas), Sunningdale Foursomes (with Neil Coles), Gor-Ray Cup

== Results in major championships ==
Tournament	1956	1957	1958	1959	1960	1961	1962	1963	1964	1965	1966	1967	1968	1969
The Open Championship	CUT		CUT				T12	CUT		CUT				CUT

Tournament	1970	1971	1972	1973	1974	1975	1976	1977	1978	1979	1980	1981	1982	1983
The Open Championship	CUT											CUT	CUT	CUT

Note: Whitehead only played in The Open Championship.

Did not play

CUT = missed the half-way cut
"T" indicates a tie for a place
