= Nigel Paul (cricketer) =

English cricketer (1933–2022)

Personal information
- Full name: Nigel Aldridge Paul
- Born: 31 March 1933; Surbiton, Surrey, England
- Died: 23 August 2022 (aged 89)
- Height: 6 ft 5 in (1.96 m)
- Batting: Right-handed
- Bowling: Left-arm fast-medium

Domestic team information
- Years: Team
- 1954–1955: Warwickshire

Career statistics
Competition	First-class
Matches	7
Runs scored	157
Batting average	15.70
100s/50s	0/0
Top score	40
Balls bowled	419
Wickets	3
Bowling average	65.33
5 wickets in innings	0
10 wickets in match	0
Best bowling	1/5
Catches/stumpings	6/–
- Source: Cricinfo, 25 October 2015

Nigel Aldridge Paul (31 March 1933 – 23 August 2022) was an English cricketer active in the 1950s, making seven appearances in first-class cricket as a batting all-rounder.

Paul was educated at Cranleigh School, where he played for the school cricket team from 1949–1951. He made his debut in first-class cricket when he was selected to play for Warwickshire against the touring Canadians at Edgbaston in 1954. He made three further first-class appearances for Warwickshire in 1955, playing two university matches against Oxford and Cambridge, and once against the Combined Services, but did not feature in any County Championship matches. He played a first-class match for the Free Foresters in 1956, and followed this up with two matches at The Saffrons in 1958 for DR Jardine's XI against Oxford University and Cambridge University. In seven first-class matches, Paul scored a total of 157 runs, averaging 15.70, with a high score of 40. As a bowler he took just 3 wickets, which came at an expensive average of 65.33 runs apiece. He was one of the tallest first-class cricketers of the time, standing nearly two metres tall, which he used when batting to hit the ball hard, and score at a fast rate which was unusual for the times. His height helped when he was bowling, generating pace which forced the batsman onto the back foot.

Paul was a leading figure within the Old Cranleighan Cricket Club, a cricket club for former pupils of Cranleigh School. Following the Second World War, the club was virtually defunct, but he re-formed the club in the mid-1950s. He was club captain from 1958–1964 and president from 1981–1985.

Paul was also an amateur golfer. He won the Surrey Open in 1966. Playing with Peter Oosterhuis he won the 1969 Whitbread professional-amateur foursomes at Pleasington.

Paul died on 23 August 2022, at the age of 89.
