= El Paraiso Open =

Tournament information
- Location: Marbella, Spain
- Established: 1974
- Course: Golf El Paraiso
- Par: 72
- Tour: European Tour
- Format: Stroke play
- Prize fund: £20,000
- Month played: October
- Final year: 1974

Tournament record score
- Aggregate: 212 Manuel Ballesteros (1974); 212 Peter Oosterhuis (1974)
- To par: −4 as above

Final champion
- (England) Peter Oosterhuis
- Location in Spain Location in Andalusia

The El Paraiso Open was a golf tournament on the European Tour in 1974. It was held at El Paraiso Golf Club in Marbella, Spain. It was won by England's Peter Oosterhuis, who defeated Manuel Ballesteros scoring a birdie 4 at the first hole of a sudden-death playoff and winning the first prize of £3,000. Because of lightning, the second round was not completed until the third day and the tournament was reduced to 54 holes with 18 holes on the final day.

== Winners ==
| Year | Winner | Score | To par | Margin of victory | Runner-up |
|---|---|---|---|---|---|
| 1974 | (England) Peter Oosterhuis | 212 (Note: Shortened to 54 holes due to weather.) | −4 | Playoff | (Spain) Manuel Ballesteros |
