= Basque Coast Open =

The Basque Coast Open was a professional golf tournament that was played from 1967 to 1969 at Biarritz Golf Club in Biarritz, France. It was won by Spain's Manuel Ballesteros and France's Jean Garaïalde.

== Winners ==
Year	Winner	Country	Score	Ref
1969	Jean Garaïalde	France	273	
1968	Manuel Ballesteros	Spain	263	
1967	Randall Vines	Australia		
