= 1971 Piccadilly World Match Play Championship =

Coordinates: 51°23′48″N 0°35′45″W

Tournament information
- Dates: 7–9 October 1971
- Location: Virginia Water, Surrey, England
- Course(s): West Course, Wentworth
- Format: Match play – 36 holes

Statistics
- Par: 74
- Length: 6,997 yards (6,398 m)
- Field: 8 players
- Prize fund: £25,000
- Winner's share: £8,500

Champion
- (South Africa) Gary Player
- def. Jack Nicklaus 5 & 4

The 1971 Piccadilly World Match Play Championship was the eighth World Match Play Championship. It was played from Thursday 7 to Saturday 9 October on the West Course at Wentworth. Eight players competed in a straight knock-out competition, with each match contested over 36 holes. The champion received £8,500 out of a total prize fund of £25,000. In the final, Gary Player beat Jack Nicklaus 5 & 4 to win the championship for the fourth time.

In his first round match, Jack Nicklaus went 4 up over Lu Liang-Huan after six holes but Lu levelled the match by the 12th hole and went ahead at the 16th. Nicklaus won the 18th to be level at lunch. Nicklaus then went 3 up after eight holes in the afternoon and although Lu reduced the deficit to 1 hole, Nicklaus holed a long putt for a birdie at the 16th to take a two-hole lead and won 2 & 1 at the next hole. Neil Coles won six holes in a row against Charles Coody from the 12th to the 17th holes of the first round and went to lunch six holes up. Coles eventually won by a score of 5 & 4.

In the final between Jack Nicklaus and Gary Player, Nicklaus was 1 up at lunch but Player won the first four holes in the afternoon and, with Nicklaus missing a number of short putts, Player eventually won 5 & 4. It was his fourth win in the eight World Match Play events contested.

== Course ==
Hole	1	2	3	4	5	6	7	8	9	Out	10	11	12	13	14	15	16	17	18	In	Total
Yards	476	157	457	497	192	347	403	400	460	3,389	190	408	480	437	183	480	380	555	495	3,608	6,997
Par	5	3	4	5	3	4	4	4	4	36	3	4	5	4	3	5	4	5	5	38	74

== Scores ==
Quarter-finals; 7 October
(United States) Jack Nicklaus	2 & 1
(Taiwan) Lu Liang-Huan
(United States) Charles Coody
(England) Neil Coles	5 & 4
(South Africa) Gary Player	4 & 3
(England) Tony Jacklin
(United States) Arnold Palmer
(New Zealand) Bob Charles	37 h

Semi-finals; 8 October
(United States) Jack Nicklaus	7 & 5
(England) Neil Coles
(South Africa) Gary Player	2 & 1
(New Zealand) Bob Charles

Final; 9 October
(United States) Jack Nicklaus
(South Africa) Gary Player	5 & 4

== Prize money ==
The winner received £8,500, the runner-up £4,500, the losing semi-finalists £3,000 and the first round losers £1,500, making a total prize fund of £25,000.
