= 1970 Open Championship =

Coordinates: 56.343°N 2.803°W

Tournament information
- Dates: 8–12 July 1970
- Location: St Andrews, Scotland
- Course: Old Course at St Andrews

Statistics
- Par: 72
- Length: 6,951 yards (6,356 m)
- Field: 134 players 80 after 1st cut 57 after 2nd cut
- Cut: 149 (+5) (1st cut); 223 (+7) (2nd cut)
- Prize fund: £40,000 $96,000
- Winner's share: £5,250 $12,600

Champion
- (United States) Jack Nicklaus
- 283 (−5), playoff

Location in Scotland
Location in Fife, Scotland

The 1970 Open Championship was the 99th Open Championship, played 8–12 July at the Old Course in St Andrews, Scotland. Jack Nicklaus won the second of his three Opens in an 18-hole Sunday playoff over Doug Sanders, 72 to 73. In gusty winds during the fourth round on Saturday, Sanders saved par from the Road Hole bunker and led by one heading to the 72nd hole. After a lengthy drive on the short par-4, he took four shots from just 74 yards (68 m) and missed a downhill putt for par from three feet to win.

This was the first playoff at The Open since 1963 and the first at 18 holes. The previous playoffs were 36 holes on Saturday. Prior to 1966, the final two rounds of The Open were played on Friday. The playoff format was changed again to the four-hole aggregate after the 1985 Open, first used in 1989.

A thunderstorm late in the opening round on Wednesday evening caused a suspension in play; it was competed early the next day.

== Course ==
Hole	Name	Yards	Par	Hole	Name	Yards	Par
1	Burn	374	4	10	Tenth ^	338	4
2	Dyke	411	4	11	High (In)	170	3
3	Cartgate (Out)	405	4	12	Heathery (In)	312	4
4	Ginger Beer	470	4	13	Hole O'Cross (In)	427	4
5	Hole O'Cross (Out)	567	5	14	Long	560	5
6	Heathery (Out)	414	4	15	Cartgate (In)	413	4
7	High (Out)	364	4	16	Corner of the Dyke	380	4
8	Short	163	3	17	Road	466	4
9	End	359	4	18	Tom Morris	358	4
Out		3,527	36	In		3,424	36
Source:				Total		6,951	72

^ The 10th hole was posthumously named for Bobby Jones in 1972

Previous lengths of the course for The Open Championship (since 1950):

- 6,926 yards (6,333 m) - 1964
- 6,936 yards (6,342 m) - 1960, 1955

== Round summaries ==
=== First round ===
Wednesday, 8 July 1970
Thursday, 9 July 1970

Place	Player	Score	To par
1	(England) Neil Coles	65	−7
2	(England) Tommy Horton	66	−6
T3	(England) Maurice Bembridge	67	−5
T3	(South Africa) Harold Henning	67	−5
T3	(England) Tony Jacklin	67	−5
T3	(Argentina) Florentino Molina	67	−5
T3	(Scotland) John Richardson	67	−5
T8	(United States) Tommy Aaron	68	−4
T8	(Wales) Brian Huggett	68	−4
T8	(United States) Jack Nicklaus	68	−4
T8	(United States) Arnold Palmer	68	−4
T8	(United States) Doug Sanders	68	−4
T8	(Australia) Peter Thomson	68	−4
T8	(United States) Lee Trevino	68	−4
T8	(England) Guy Wolstenholme	68	−4

=== Second round ===
Thursday, 9 July 1970

Place	Player	Score	To par
1	(United States) Lee Trevino	68-68=136	−8
T2	(England) Tony Jacklin	67-70=137	−7
T2	(United States) Jack Nicklaus	68-69=137	−7
T4	(England) Clive Clark	69-70=139	−5
T4	(England) Neil Coles	65-74=139	−5
T4	(South Africa) Harold Henning	67-72=139	−5
T4	(England) Tommy Horton	66-73=139	−5
T4	(Scotland) John Richardson	67-72=139	−5
T4	(United States) Doug Sanders	68-71=139	−5
T10	(Republic of Ireland) Christy O'Connor Snr	72-68=140	−4
T10	(United States) Arnold Palmer	68-72=140	−4

Amateurs: Melnyk (-1), Bonallack (+1), Humphreys (+2), George (+2), Webster (+5),
MacDonald (+7), Berry (+8), Steel (+10), Mosey (+11), Sumner (+11), Sweeny Jr (+11), Farmer (+14)

=== Third round ===
Friday, 10 July 1970

Place	Player	Score	To par
1	(United States) Lee Trevino	68-68-72=208	−8
T2	(England) Tony Jacklin	67-70-73=210	−6
T2	(United States) Jack Nicklaus	68-69-73=210	−6
T2	(United States) Doug Sanders	68-71-71=210	−6
T5	(England) Neil Coles	65-74-72=211	−5
T5	(England) Peter Oosterhuis	73-69-69=211	−5
7	(South Africa) Harold Henning	67-72-73=212	−4
T8	(England) Tommy Horton	66-73-75=214	−2
T8	(Northern Ireland) Hugh Jackson	69-72-73=214	−2
T8	(Republic of Ireland) Christy O'Connor Snr	72-68-74=214	−2

Amateurs: Melnyk (+3), Humphreys (+6), Bonallack (+8), George (+9), Webster (+11)

=== Final round ===
Saturday, 11 July 1970

Place	Player	Score	To par	Money (£)
T1	(United States) Jack Nicklaus	68-69-73-73=283	−5	Playoff
T1	(United States) Doug Sanders	68-71-71-73=283	−5	Playoff
T3	(South Africa) Harold Henning	67-72-73-73=285	−3	2,750
T3	(United States) Lee Trevino	68-68-72-77=285	−3	2,750
5	(England) Tony Jacklin	67-70-73-76=286	−2	2,200
T6	(England) Neil Coles	65-74-72-76=287	−1	1,750
T6	(England) Peter Oosterhuis	73-69-69-76=287	−1	1,750
8	(Northern Ireland) Hugh Jackson	69-72-73-74=288	E	1,400
T9	(England) Tommy Horton	66-73-75-75=289	+1	1,200
T9	(Scotland) John Panton	72-73-73-71=289	+1	1,200
T9	(Australia) Peter Thomson	68-74-73-74=289	+1	1,200

Amateurs: Melnyk (+10), Humphreys (+13)

=== Playoff ===
Sunday, 12 July 1970

Place	Player	Score	To par	Money (£)
1	(United States) Jack Nicklaus	72	E	5,250
2	(United States) Doug Sanders	73	+1	3,750

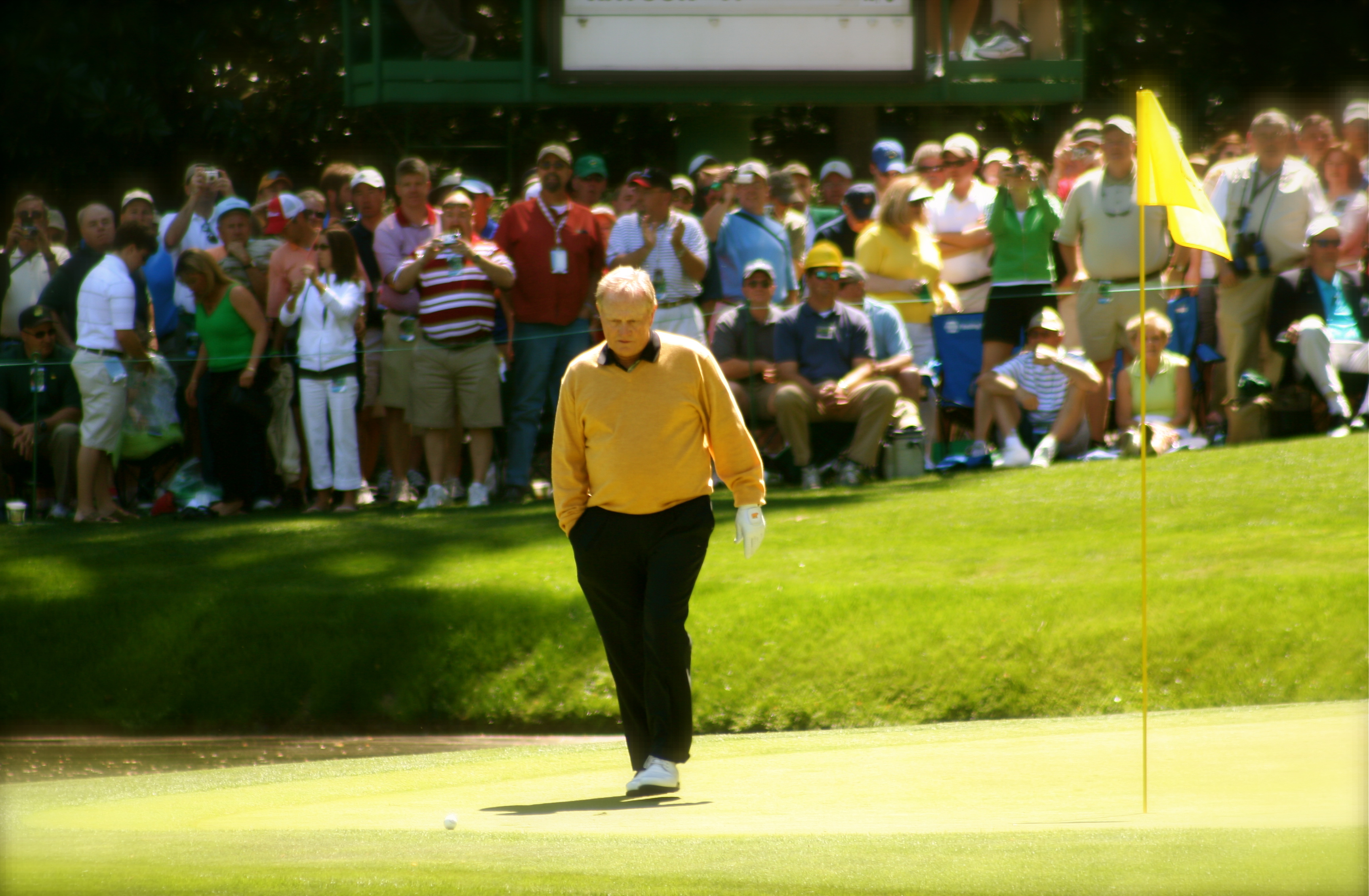
Jack Nicklaus

==== Scorecard ====
Hole	1	2	3	4	5	6	7	8	9	10	11	12	13	14	15	16	17	18
Par	4	4	4	4	5	4	4	3	4	4	3	4	4	5	4	4	4	4
(United States) Jack Nicklaus	E	E	E	E	E	E	E	E	E	E	E	E	E	E	E	+1	+1	E
(United States) Doug Sanders	E	E	+1	+2	+2	+2	+2	+2	+2	+2	+3	+3	+4	+3	+2	+2	+2	+1

Birdie	Bogey
