= 1968 Piccadilly World Match Play Championship =

Coordinates: 51°23′48″N 0°35′45″W

Tournament information
- Dates: 10–13 October 1968
- Location: Virginia Water, Surrey, England
- Course(s): West Course, Wentworth
- Format: Match play – 36 holes

Statistics
- Par: 74
- Length: 6,997 yards (6,398 m)
- Field: 8 players
- Prize fund: £16,000
- Winner's share: £5,000

Champion
- (South Africa) Gary Player
- def. Bob Charles 1 up

The 1968 Piccadilly World Match Play Championship was the fifth World Match Play Championship. It was played from Thursday 10 to Saturday 12 October on the West Course at Wentworth. Eight players competed in a straight knock-out competition, with each match contested over 36 holes. The champion received £5,000 out of a total prize fund of £16,000. In the final Gary Player beat Bob Charles at the 36th hole to win the tournament for the third time in four years.

The tournament included two British golfers: Brian Huggett and Tony Jacklin. Huggett was drawn against Arnold Palmer and looked to be out of the championship when he was 4 down with six holes to play. Huggett then had five birdies in a row to reduce the gap to one hole. However Palmer's four at the last gave him the victory by 2 holes. Jacklin was 4 up at lunch against Lee Trevino and won comfortably 4 & 3.

In his semi-final against Gary Player, Jacklin was 1 down at lunch but won three holes early in the afternoon to go 2 up. However he then had four bogeys in a row to go 2 down after 27 holes. The match then turned again and Jacklin had six birdies coming home to leave the match tied after 36 holes. The spectators lined the first hole in the expectation that the match would continue but it was decided that the light was too poor to continue that evening. Play was abandoned on Saturday because of heavy rain. Player beat Jacklin at the first extra hole when they returned on Sunday after Jacklin had three putted.

In the final, Player was 1 up over Bob Charles at lunch. The first eight holes in the afternoon were halved before Player went 2 up at the 9th. Charles then levelled the match with birdies at the 10th and 11th. Charles missed from six feet at the 15th to give Player the lead again and they halved the last three holes to give Player the victory.

Bob Goalby, the Masters Champion declined an invitation because his wife was ill.

The 72-hole stroke play Piccadilly Tournament competition which had been played on the East Course prior to the World Match Play Championship was replaced by a four-ball better-ball match play tournament. 32 pairs competed in the knock-out competition, each round over 18 holes of the East Course. The plan was to play the first round on Monday 7 October, followed by two rounds on each of the following two days. However, heavy rain on the second day meant that the third round could not be played that day and the final was delayed until Thursday 10 October, the same day as the opening round of the World Match Play Championship. The winners were Richard Emery and Hugh Jackson who beat Neil Coles and Bryon Hutchinson 2&1 in the final. The winners won £500 each out of the total prize money was £4,000.

== Course ==
Hole	1	2	3	4	5	6	7	8	9	Out	10	11	12	13	14	15	16	17	18	In	Total
Yards	476	157	457	497	192	347	403	400	460	3,389	190	408	480	437	183	480	380	555	495	3,608	6,997
Par	5	3	4	5	3	4	4	4	4	36	3	4	5	4	3	5	4	5	5	38	74

== Scores ==
Quarter-finals; 10 October
(United States) Arnold Palmer	2 up
(Wales) Brian Huggett
(United States) Billy Casper
(New Zealand) Bob Charles	1 up
(South Africa) Gary Player	8 & 7
(Australia) Peter Thomson
(United States) Lee Trevino
(England) Tony Jacklin	4 & 3

Semi-finals; 11 October
(United States) Arnold Palmer
(New Zealand) Bob Charles	7 & 6
(South Africa) Gary Player	37 h
(England) Tony Jacklin

Final; 12 October
(New Zealand) Bob Charles
(South Africa) Gary Player	1 up

The match between Gary Player and Tony Jacklin was completed on 12 October having been all square after 36 holes when it became too dark to continue.

== Prize money ==
The winner received £5,000, the runner-up £3,000, the losing semi-finalists £2,000 and the first round losers £1,000, making a total prize fund of £16,000.
