= John Player Classic =

Tournament information
- Location: Turnberry, Scotland
- Established: 1970
- Course: Turnberry
- Par: 71
- Tour: European Tour
- Format: Stroke play
- Prize fund: £58,550
- Month played: September
- Final year: 1973

Tournament record score
- Aggregate: 285 Bob Charles (1972)
- To par: −2 Christy O'Connor Snr (1970)

Final champion
- (United States) Charles Coody
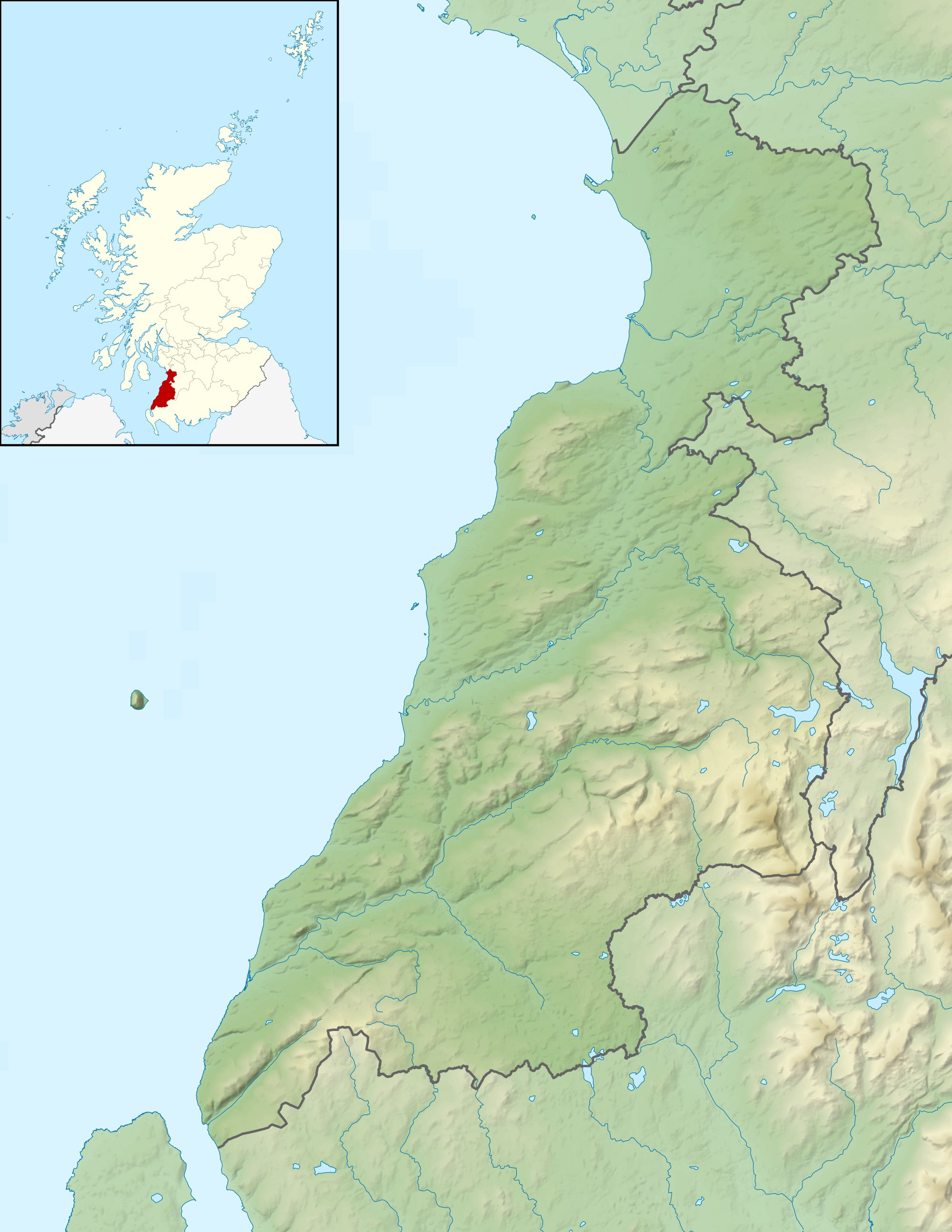
- Location in Scotland Location in South Ayrshire

The John Player Classic was the richest golf tournament in Britain between 1970 and 1973. In 1972 and 1973 it was an event on the fledgling European Tour.

The John Player Classic was first played in 1970 at Notts Golf Club (Hollinwell), when Ireland's Christy O'Connor Snr triumphed by one stroke over England's Tony Jacklin to collect the £25,000 first prize. Having not been held in 1971, the tournament returned as part of the new European Tour in 1972. It also had a change of venue, being moved to Turnberry on the west coast of Scotland.

The tournament was played just once more, in 1973, when American Charles Coody took the title. The second round featured some of the worst conditions ever seen in a professional golf tournament, with a gale-force wind gusting up to 65 mph, and rain falling horizontally. Marquees and hoardings were destroyed, with several exhibitors tents being uprooted and flung onto the course.

It was cancelled the following year because of a clash of dates with the PGA Tour's Kaiser International Open Invitational.

== Winners ==
Year	Winner	Score	To par	Margin of victory	Runner(s)-up	Winner's share (£)	Venue	Ref.
1974	Cancelled							
1973	(United States) Charles Coody	289	+5	3 strokes	(England) Tony Jacklin	15,000	Turnberry	
1972	(New Zealand) Bob Charles	285	+1	1 stroke	(United States) Gay Brewer (England) Peter Oosterhuis	15,000	Turnberry	
1971: No tournament
1970	(Republic of Ireland) Christy O'Connor Snr	286	−2	1 stroke	(England) Tony Jacklin	25,000	Notts	
