= Roger Fidler =

American journalist and designer (born 1943)

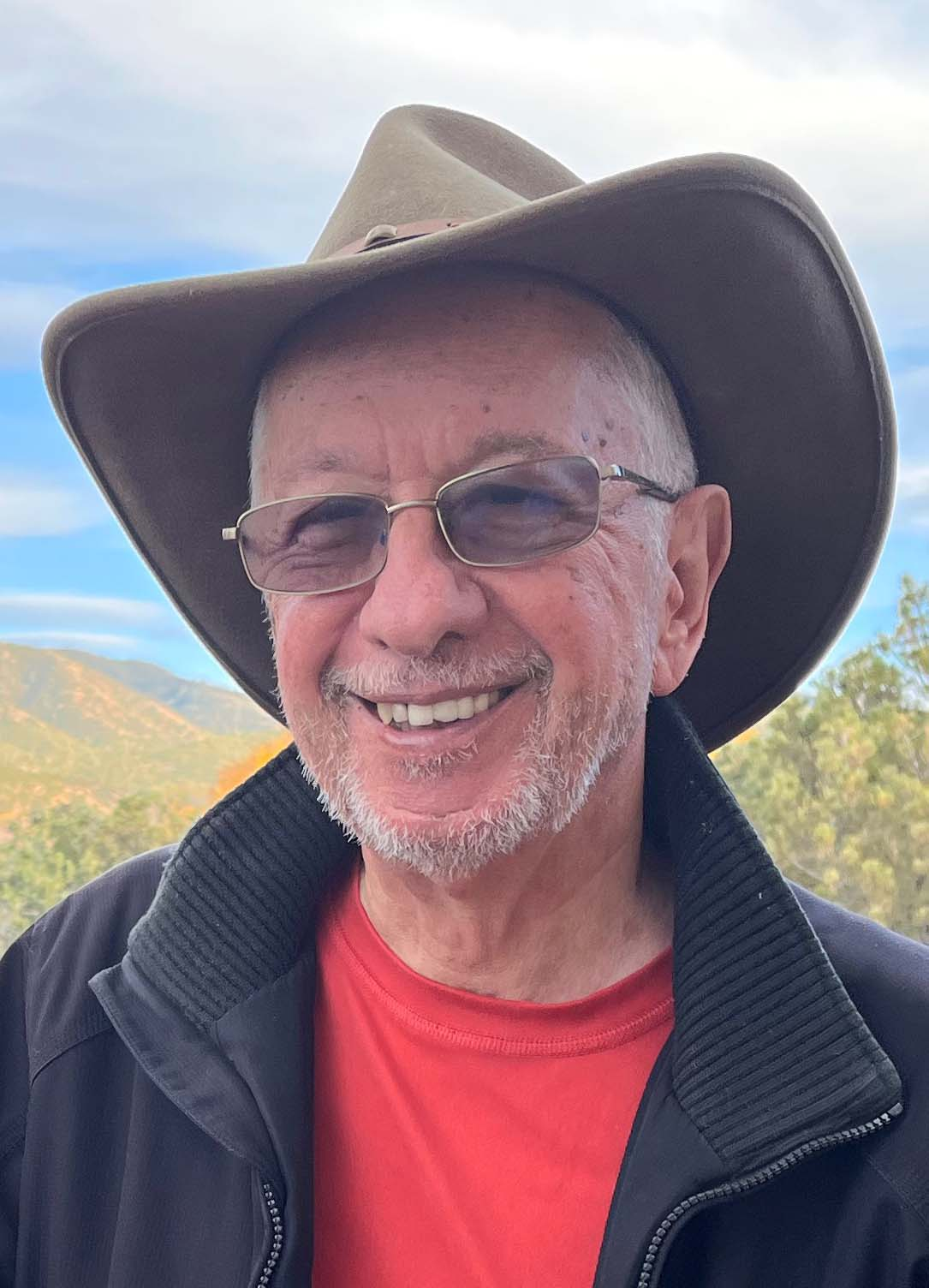
- Fidler in 2021
- Born: January 21, 1943 (age 82); Mount Vernon, Washington U.S.
- Education: University of Oregon

Roger Fidler (born January 21, 1943, in Mount Vernon, Washington) is an internationally recognized digital news media pioneer and journalist. He is best known for his prototypes of digital newspapers and mobile tablets, which he first described in a 1981 essay he wrote and illustrated for an Associated Press Managing Editors special report titled Newspapers in the Year 2000. In 1994, he produced a video at the Knight Ridder Information Design Laboratory, titled “The Tablet Newspaper: A Vision for the Future,” that demonstrated how tablets might be used for reading newspapers early in the twenty-first century. After Steve Jobs launched the Apple iPad in 2010, a digital copy of his video went viral on the web and embroiled Fidler in a global patent war between Apple and Samsung.

== Early life ==
Fidler was the only child of Frank W Fidler and Marjorie Madeline McLaughlin. In 1945, they moved to Cleveland, Ohio, where his father was employed as a machinist with Harris-Seybold, a printing press manufacturer. When he was nine years old, his parents separated and his mother took him furtively to Eugene, Oregon. In the fall of 1953, he began delivering newspapers for the Register-Guard.

When Fidler was 13 years old he developed a passion for stargazing. By his junior year in high school, he was president of the Eugene Astronomical League, which he had co-founded, and was fully committed to becoming a professional astronomer. But that was not to be. After graduation, he spent most of the summer of ’61 in hospitals fighting chronic ulcerative colitis. Despite the likelihood of living with potentially life-threatening flare-ups, he was determined not to let the disease prevent him from leading a fulfilling life.

== Early career ==
Fidler began his newspaper career in the fall of 1961 doing “a little bit of everything”, including writing a weekly science column he called Layman’s Astronomy, for the Emerald Empire News, a weekday-only newspaper in Eugene, Oregon. He then continued his career as a journalist and news artist for the Eugene Register-Guard, Daily Herald in Everett, Washington, Pacific Stars and Stripes in Tokyo (1967-1970), The St. Petersburg Times in Florida, and The Detroit Free Press.

In February 1979, Fidler was recruited by the Knight Ridder newspaper chain to serve as the graphics and design consultant for a team to develop an electronic newspaper. That initiative, called Viewtron, would become America's first consumer online service, a forerunner of AOL and the web.

== Later career ==
Fidler served as Director of New Media Development for Knight-Ridder, Inc., and headed the company's Information Design Laboratory (IDL) in Boulder, Colorado (1992-1995). He previously founded and headed two subsidiary companies—Knight-Ridder Graphics Network (1983-1987), and PressLink (1985-1991) .

Fidler was named as a Freedom Forum Media Studies Center Fellow for the ’91-’92 academic year at Columbia University in New York City. During his fellowship year, he created the first working prototype of his tablet newspaper concept, which The New York Times featured in a Sunday Business section article titled A Media Pioneer’s Quest: Portable Electronic Newspapers.

After retiring from Knight-Ridder in July 1995, Fidler became a tenured professor of journalism and information design at Kent State University in Ohio. In 2004, he joined the Missouri School of Journalism’s Donald W. Reynolds Journalism Institute in Columbia as its Inaugural Reynolds Fellow (’04-’05). Upon completion of his fellowship year, he was hired as the Institute’s program director of digital publishing. At the RJI he coordinated digital and mobile news media research projects and directed the Digital Publishing Alliance, a member-supported initiative he had founded that included The New York Times, Los Angeles Times, Associated Press, and more than 30 other news organizations

Fidler is the author of Touching the Future: My Odyssey from Print to Online Publishing (Amazon Publishing, 2019) and Mediamorphosis: Understanding New Media (Sage, 1997), as well as articles and book chapters.

== Awards and recognition ==
In 1999 Fidler was Honored by the Freedom Forum Newseum as an electronic news pioneer and one of history’s “Most Intriguing Newspeople” in its book Crusaders, Scoundrels, Journalists. In 2003 and 2004, he was a finalist for the World Technology Award in Media and Journalism. He was named a World Technology Network Fellow in 2003 and was inducted into the University of Oregon School of Journalism and Mass Communication Hall of Achievement

His book, Touching the Future was a finalist for the Next Generation of Indie Book Awards and won the silver medal for the IPPY Book Awards
