= Volvo World Match Play Championship =

Coordinates: 51.19°N 0.73°E

World Match Play Championship
Tournament information
- Location: Ash, Kent, England
- Established: 1964
- Course: London Golf Club
- Par: 72
- Length: 7,204 yards (6,587 m)
- Organized by: IMG
- Tour: European Tour (since 2004)
- Format: Match play
- Prize fund: €2,250,000
- Month played: October
- Final year: 2014

Tournament record score
- Score: 10 and 8 Paul Casey (2006)

Final champion
- (Finland) Mikko Ilonen
- Location in England Location in Kent

The Volvo World Match Play Championship was an annual match play men's professional golf tournament which was staged from 1964 to 2014.

The World Match Play Championship was a limited field event, originally contested by just eight players before being expanded to sixteen in 1977, and to 24 in 2011. In 2004 it became an official tournament on the European Tour for the first time, having previously been a designated "approved special event". The event was traditionally played in the autumn, usually in October, but moved to a May date in 2011. Previous sponsors have included Piccadilly, Suntory, Toyota, Cisco, HSBC and Volvo.

The Wentworth Club near London was host venue for the World Match Play for the first 45 years. From 2009 to 2012 the event was played at the Finca Cortesín Golf Club in Casares near Málaga, Spain. In 2013, the event was held at the Thracian Cliffs Golf & Beach Resort in Kavarna, Bulgaria, and in 2014, it was held at the London Golf Club in Kent, England.

== History ==
The tournament was founded by sports agent Mark McCormack as a showcase for the players he managed. The inaugural event in 1964 was won by Arnold Palmer, who was McCormack's first client. The calibre of the winners has consistently been very high, with the majority of the tournaments being won by players who have been ranked in the top two in the Official World Golf Ranking or its predecessor Mark McCormack's world golf rankings.

The event consisted of 36-hole matches played in a single day. The event had an eight-man field from 1964 to 1976. It expanded to 16 players for 1977 and 1978. In 1979, the field was 12 players, with four seeded players being given a bye in the first round. It was sometimes felt that this was unfair, as an unseeded player needed to string together eight successful rounds in four days to win, twice as many as in a stroke play tournament, whereas a seeded player only needed six successful rounds to win.

For its first 40 years the tournament was an unofficial one, highly regarded by golf fans in Britain and many other countries outside the United States, popular with players, and happily coexisting with the European Tour, at whose home course it was played, but not taken into account on an official tour money list. The introduction in 1999 of the 64-man WGC-Accenture Match Play Championship, which selected its field on the basis of the World Rankings, was a blow to the prestige of the older event, whose exhibition aspects, with a small invited field, were emphasised by contrast.

In 2003, the tournament was given a major overhaul. Greatly increased sponsorship was secured from the largest British based bank, HSBC, and the winner's prize was increased to £1 million, which was then easily the largest in world golf (although the Nedbank Golf Challenge had had a $2 million first prize from 2000 to 2002).

In 2004, the championship became an official money European Tour event - not, however, the actual prize money, as the first prize was far higher than for the other events on the tour, but scaled-down amounts intended to be more proportionate. The field was increased to 16 players, all of whom needed to play eight rounds of golf to win, to eliminate the advantage previously given to seeds. A qualifying system, based primarily on performances in the four majors, replaced the invitations of the past. World ranking points were allocated to the event for the first time since 1999.

In recent years, Americans have tended to decline their invitations. In 2005, no Americans took part at all, and with stalwart Ernie Els injured and Vijay Singh and Sergio García also absent, the field was one of the weakest seen at the event, with just one player from the world top ten. The 2006 event had a considerably stronger field with six of the world's top ten players headed by the world's top two ranked players Tiger Woods and Jim Furyk. But in January 2007 HSBC activated a break clause in its ten-year contract and withdrew from sponsorship after the 2007 event.

After HSBC withdrew its sponsorship in 2007, the tournament was given another major overhaul. After a break in 2008, the tournament returned in 2009 with Volvo as the new title sponsor. The event moved from Wentworth to the Finca Cortesín Golf Club near Málaga in Spain. The format switched to an opening round robin, with 16 players divided into four groups and the winners advancing to the 36-hole semi-finals. The qualifying criteria were also changed to include certain players based on their nationality. The total prize money for 2009 was €3,250,000, with €750,000 of that going to the winner.

After another break in 2010, the tournament returned in May 2011, several months earlier than the traditional date in autumn. The field was expanded to 24 players, split into eight groups, playing in a round robin format. The top two players from each group would progress to the knockout stage. Unlike previous years, all matches would be played over 18 holes. The total prize money for 2011 was €3,400,000, with €800,000 of that going to the winner.

In 2013, the event was held in Bulgaria, becoming the first European Tour event in Bulgaria, as Volvo had requested that the championship be moved to geographical areas of interest for the company and therefore the event will be rotated around Europe. In 2014, the event was played in October at London Golf Club in Kent, England. Prior to the tournament Volvo announced they were withdrawing their support as they reduced their sponsorship commitments on the European Tour.

== Winners ==
Year	Tour (Note: EUR − European Tour.)	Winner	Score	Runner-up
Volvo World Match Play Championship
2014	EUR	(Finland) Mikko Ilonen	3 and 1	(Sweden) Henrik Stenson
2013	EUR	(Northern Ireland) Graeme McDowell	2 and 1	(Thailand) Thongchai Jaidee
2012	EUR	(Belgium) Nicolas Colsaerts	1 up	(Northern Ireland) Graeme McDowell
2011	EUR	(England) Ian Poulter	2 and 1	(England) Luke Donald
2010: No tournament
2009	EUR	(England) Ross Fisher	4 and 3	(United States) Anthony Kim
World Match Play Championship
2008	EUR	Cancelled due to lack of sponsorship		
HSBC World Match Play Championship
2007	EUR	(South Africa) Ernie Els (7)	6 and 4	(Argentina) Ángel Cabrera
2006	EUR	(England) Paul Casey	10 and 8	(United States) Shaun Micheel
2005	EUR	(New Zealand) Michael Campbell	2 and 1	(Republic of Ireland) Paul McGinley
2004	EUR	(South Africa) Ernie Els (6)	2 and 1	(England) Lee Westwood
2003		(South Africa) Ernie Els (5)	4 and 3	(Denmark) Thomas Bjørn
Cisco World Match Play Championship
2002		(South Africa) Ernie Els (4)	2 and 1	(Spain) Sergio García
2001		(Wales) Ian Woosnam (3)	2 and 1	(Republic of Ireland) Pádraig Harrington
2000		(England) Lee Westwood	38 holes	(Scotland) Colin Montgomerie
1999		(Scotland) Colin Montgomerie	3 and 2	(United States) Mark O'Meara
1998		(United States) Mark O'Meara	1 up	(United States) Tiger Woods
Toyota World Match Play Championship
1997		(Fiji) Vijay Singh	1 up	(South Africa) Ernie Els
1996		(South Africa) Ernie Els (3)	3 and 2	(Fiji) Vijay Singh
1995		(South Africa) Ernie Els (2)	3 and 1	(Australia) Steve Elkington
1994		(South Africa) Ernie Els	4 and 2	(Scotland) Colin Montgomerie
1993		(United States) Corey Pavin	1 up	(England) Nick Faldo
1992		(England) Nick Faldo (2)	8 and 7	(United States) Jeff Sluman
1991		(Spain) Seve Ballesteros (5)	3 and 2	(Zimbabwe) Nick Price
Suntory World Match Play Championship
1990		(Wales) Ian Woosnam (2)	4 and 2	(Zimbabwe) Mark McNulty
1989		(England) Nick Faldo	1 up	(Wales) Ian Woosnam
1988		(Scotland) Sandy Lyle	2 and 1	(England) Nick Faldo
1987		(Wales) Ian Woosnam	1 up	(Scotland) Sandy Lyle
1986		(Australia) Greg Norman (3)	2 and 1	(Scotland) Sandy Lyle
1985		(Spain) Seve Ballesteros (4)	6 and 5	(Germany) Bernhard Langer
1984		(Spain) Seve Ballesteros (3)	2 and 1	(Germany) Bernhard Langer
1983		(Australia) Greg Norman (2)	3 and 2	(England) Nick Faldo
1982		(Spain) Seve Ballesteros (2)	37 holes	(Scotland) Sandy Lyle
1981		(Spain) Seve Ballesteros	1 up	(United States) Ben Crenshaw
1980		(Australia) Greg Norman	1 up	(Scotland) Sandy Lyle
1979		(United States) Bill Rogers	1 up	(Japan) Isao Aoki
Colgate World Match Play Championship
1978		(Japan) Isao Aoki	3 and 2	(New Zealand) Simon Owen
1977		(Australia) Graham Marsh	5 and 3	(United States) Raymond Floyd
Piccadilly World Match Play Championship
1976		(Australia) David Graham	38 holes	(United States) Hale Irwin
1975		(United States) Hale Irwin (2)	4 and 2	(United States) Al Geiberger
1974		(United States) Hale Irwin	3 and 1	(South Africa) Gary Player
1973		(South Africa) Gary Player (5)	40 holes	(Australia) Graham Marsh
1972		(United States) Tom Weiskopf	4 and 3	(United States) Lee Trevino
1971		(South Africa) Gary Player (4)	5 and 4	(United States) Jack Nicklaus
1970		(United States) Jack Nicklaus	2 and 1	(United States) Lee Trevino
1969		(New Zealand) Bob Charles	37 holes	(United States) Gene Littler
1968		(South Africa) Gary Player (3)	1 up	(New Zealand) Bob Charles
1967		(United States) Arnold Palmer (2)	1 up	(Australia) Peter Thomson
1966		(South Africa) Gary Player (2)	6 and 4	(United States) Jack Nicklaus
1965		(South Africa) Gary Player	3 and 2	(Australia) Peter Thomson
1964		(United States) Arnold Palmer	2 and 1	(England) Neil Coles

== Multiple winners ==
The following players have won the World Match Play Championship more than once:

Wins	Player	Years won
7	(South Africa) Ernie Els	1994, 1995, 1996, 2002, 2003, 2004, 2007
5	(South Africa) Gary Player	1965, 1966, 1968, 1971, 1973
5	(Spain) Seve Ballesteros	1981, 1982, 1984, 1985, 1991
3	(Australia) Greg Norman	1980, 1983, 1986
3	(Wales) Ian Woosnam	1987, 1990, 2001
2	(United States) Arnold Palmer	1964, 1967
2	(United States) Hale Irwin	1974, 1975
2	(England) Nick Faldo	1989, 1992

== Qualification criteria ==
For the 2014 championship, the qualification criteria were as follows:

1. Defending champion
2. The winner of the 2013 European Tour Race to Dubai
3. The winner of the 2014 Volvo Golf Champions
4. The winner of the 2014 Volvo China Open
5. The winner of the 2014 Scottish Open
6. The leading three available players, not otherwise exempt above, from the Official World Golf Ranking (OWGR) as of the conclusion of the 2014 Open Championship
7. The leading three available players, not otherwise exempt above, from the Race to Dubai as of the conclusion of the 2014 Open Championship
8. The current holders of the four major championships
9. One tournament invite (with top 50 of OWGR as of 2014 PGA Championship, or from host country)
- Categories (1–2) will be filled with the next highest ranked and available player(s) from the final 2013 European Tour Race to Dubai, not otherwise exempt.
- Categories (3–5) will be filled by the highest ranked and available player(s) from the 2014 European Tour Race to Dubai as of the conclusion of the 2014 Open Championship, not otherwise exempt.
- Category (8) will be filled by the highest ranked and available player from the 2014 Race to Dubai as of the conclusion of the 2014 PGA Championship, not otherwise exempt.
- Category (9) will be replaced with another tournament invite (if no top-50 OWGR or host nation players available, then the highest ranked and available player on the 2014 Race to Dubai as of the conclusion of the 2014 PGA Championship will qualify).

== Media coverage ==
The World Match Play currently was shown live by Sky Sports and it also got broadcast in Ireland by Setanta Ireland.
