= Peter Townsend (golfer) =

English golfer (born 1946)

Personal information
- Full name: Peter Michael Paul Townsend
- Nationality: England
- Born: 16 September 1946 (age 80) Cambridge, England
- Height: 5 ft 9 in (1.75 m)
- Weight: 165 lb (75 kg; 11.8 st)
- Spouses: Lorna Hogan (m. 1969; died 1994) Sofia Townsend (m. 1998)
- Children: 5, including Stuart and Hugo

Career
- Sport: Golf
- Turned professional: 1966
- Former tours: PGA Tour; European Tour; Southern Africa Tour; European Seniors Tour
- Professional wins: 18

Number of wins by tour
- Sunshine Tour: 1
- European Senior Tour: 1
- Other: 16

Best results in major championships
- Masters Tournament: 42nd: 1969
- PGA Championship: DNP
- U.S. Open: CUT: 1969
- The Open Championship: T13: 1972, 1974

Peter Michael Paul Townsend (born 16 September 1946) is an English professional golfer. After a very successful amateur career he turned professional in 1966. He had a number of wins in the early part of his professional career including the Piccadilly PGA Close Championship in 1968. He represented Great Britain twice in the Ryder Cup, in 1969 and 1971.

== Amateur career ==
Townsend had a very successful amateur career. He won the Boys Amateur Championship in 1962 and 1964, the Carris Trophy in 1964 and the British Youths Open Amateur Championship in 1965. In 1966 he won both the Brabazon Trophy and the Lytham Trophy and made the cut in the Open Championship finishing as the second-best amateur to Ronnie Shade. He was selected for Great Britain & Ireland in the 1965 Walker Cup and the 1966 Eisenhower Trophy. He turned professional in December 1966 under the management of Mark McCormack.

== Professional career ==
Townsend won the 1967 Dutch Open in his first season as a professional. In 1968 he won two British tournaments, the Coca-Cola Young Professionals' Championship and the Piccadilly PGA Close Championship. He was also runner-up in the Open de France and the R.T.V. International Trophy. These good performances gained him an entry to the Alcan Golfer of the Year Championship at Royal Birkdale where he finished second to Gay Brewer, winning over £6,000. At the end of the year he travelled to Australia. He won The Western Australian Ten Thousand and finished runner-up at the Wills Masters (where he lost in a playoff to Gary Player) and the Dunlop International.

After this promising start to his career, Townsend played a number of events on the PGA Tour in 1968, 1969, and 1970. He did not, however, enjoy the same degree of success although he did have four top-10 finishes in 1969, including a solo fourth place in the Western Open.

As well as playing in a number of PGA Tour events, Townsend was runner-up to Tony Jacklin in the 1970 W.D. & H.O. Wills Tournament. He had more success in 1971, winning the Walworth Aloyco Tournament in Italy and the Swiss Open and finishing 5th in the Order of Merit.

Townsend played on the European Tour from its founding in 1972 to 1982. He never won on the tour although he came close to winning in the 1972 Lancia d'Oro. José María Cañizares led after each of the first three rounds with scores of 69, 70 and 75. However, after a final round 73 (E) he was tied with Townsend at 287 (−5). Cañizares won the playoff at the fifth extra hole with a birdie 3, after hitting a 4-iron to 2 feet from the pin. Townsend was also a runner-up in the 1974 French Open and the 1979 European Open Championship. He finished in the top-10 of the Order of Merit twice: 4th in 1972 and 9th in 1974.

Townsend represented Great Britain twice in the Ryder Cup, in 1969 and 1971. He won his first three matches in 1969, playing twice with Tony Jacklin and once with Christy O'Connor Snr. However he lost in the next two sessions and was not selected for the final singles matches. In 1971 he played in all six sessions but lost each time, although four of the matches went to the final hole. He twice played for England in the World Cup, playing with Peter Butler in 1969 and Maurice Bembridge in 1974.

On turning professional, Townsend became the touring professional at Porters Park Golf Club, south of St Albans, where he had played as an amateur. In 1970 he became the touring professional at Portmarnock Golf Club where he stayed until 1990, having replaced Harry Bradshaw as the club professional. Townsend was elected Captain of the Professional Golfers' Association in 1994.

After turning 50, Townsend played on the European Senior Tour from 1996 to 2006, winning the Royal Westmoreland Barbados Open in March 2002.

== Personal life ==
Townsend married Irish model Lorna Hogan, a niece of golfer Joe Carr, in 1969. They had three children—sons Stuart, an actor, Dylan, a writer, and daughter Chloe, a jewellery designer. His wife, Lorna, died of a brain hemorrhage in 1994. Townsend and his Swedish second wife, Sofia, have two children, Hugo and Ella. In 2023 Hugo became a professional golfer, like his father. As an amateur, Hugo played for the International team at the 2021 Arnold Palmer Cup. He represented Sweden at the 2022 European Amateur Team Championship, finishing second with his team at Royal St George's Golf Club, England, the course where his father finished tied 19th at the Open Championship, 41 years earlier.

== Amateur wins ==
- 1962 Boys Amateur Championship
- 1964 Carris Trophy, Boys Amateur Championship
- 1965 British Youths Open Amateur Championship
- 1966 Brabazon Trophy, Lytham Trophy, Golf Illustrated Gold Vase (tie with Bobby Cole)

== Professional wins (18) ==
=== Southern Africa Tour wins (1) ===
No.	Date	Tournament	Winning score	Margin of victory	Runners-up
1	17 Jan 1976	ICL International	−3 (70-69-68=207) (Note: Shortened to 54 holes due to weather.)	1 stroke	(South Africa) Dale Hayes, (South Africa) Allan Henning

=== Safari Circuit wins (1) ===
No.	Date	Tournament	Winning score	Margin of victory	Runner-up
1	26 Mar 1978	Zambia Open	−14 (71-68-68-67=274)	4 strokes	(Scotland) Brian Barnes

=== European circuit wins (5) ===
No.	Date	Tournament	Winning score	Margin of victory	Runner-up	Ref
1	24 Jul 1967	Dutch Open	72-69-69-72=282	1 stroke	(South Africa) Sewsunker Sewgolum	
2	31 Aug 1968	Coca-Cola Young Professionals' Championship	70-68-66-66=270	3 strokes	(Scotland) Bernard Gallacher	
3	21 Sep 1968	Piccadilly PGA Close Championship	70-70-69-66=275	1 stroke	(England) Neil Coles	
4	10 Apr 1971	Walworth Aloyco Tournament	72-66-68-71=277	2 strokes	(England) Maurice Bembridge	
5	31 Jul 1971	Swiss Open	70-69-61-70=270	1 stroke	(Spain) Manuel Ballesteros	

=== Caribbean Tour wins (2) ===
- 1969 Caracas Open
- 1972 Los Lagartos Open

=== Other wins (8) ===
- 1968 The Western Australian Ten Thousand
- 1971 Carroll's Irish Match Play Championship
- 1976 Carroll's Irish Match Play Championship
- 1977 Irish Dunlop Tournament
- 1978 Hassan II Golf Trophy, Los Lagartos Open, Caribbean Open (Colombia)
- 1981 Laurent-Perrier Trophy (Belgium)

=== European Seniors Tour wins (1) ===
No.	Date	Tournament	Winning score	Margin of victory	Runner-up
1	16 Mar 2002	Royal Westmoreland Barbados Open	−4 (71-71-70=212)	1 stroke	(Chile) Guillermo Encina

== Playoff record ==
European Tour playoff record (0–1)

No.	Year	Tournament	Opponent	Result
1	1972	Lancia d'Oro	(Spain) José María Cañizares	Lost to birdie on fifth extra hole

== Results in major championships ==
Tournament	1966	1967	1968	1969	1970	1971	1972	1973	1974	1975	1976	1977	1978	1979	1980	1981	1982
Masters Tournament				42													
U.S. Open				CUT													
The Open Championship	T23		CUT	T16	T45	T40	T13	55	T13	T57	CUT		CUT		CUT	T19	T54

Note: Townsend never played in the PGA Championship.

Did not play

CUT = missed the half-way cut (3rd-round cut in 1968 Open Championship)
"T" = tied

== Team appearances ==
Amateur

- Walker Cup (representing Great Britain & Ireland): 1965 (tied)
- Eisenhower Trophy (representing Great Britain & Ireland): 1966
- St Andrews Trophy (representing Great Britain & Ireland): 1966 (winners)
- European Amateur Team Championship (representing England): 1965

Professional

- Ryder Cup (representing Great Britain): 1969 (tie), 1971
- World Cup (representing England): 1969, 1974
- Double Diamond International (representing England): 1971 (winners), 1972 (winners), 1974 (winners)
- Marlboro Nations' Cup/Philip Morris International (representing England): 1972, 1975
- Sotogrande Match (representing Great Britain and Ireland): 1974 (winners)

== See also ==
- 1967 PGA Tour Qualifying School graduates
