= Coca-Cola Young Professionals' Championship =

Golf tournament

The Coca-Cola Young Professionals' Championship was a golf tournament on the British PGA tournament circuit that was played from 1968 to 1976. Entry was restricted to players under 25 years old. Coca-Cola sponsorship ended in 1974. The 1975 event was called the T.P.D. Young Professionals' Championship while the final event in 1976 was called the T.P.D. Under-25 Championship.

== Winners ==
Year	Winner	Country	Venue	Score	Margin of victory	Runner(s)-up	Winner's share (£)	Ref
T.P.D. Under-25 Championship
1976	Howard Clark	England	Westcliff Country Club	281	3 strokes	(Wales) Kim Dabson		
T.P.D. Young Professionals' Championship
1975	Dale Hayes	South Africa	Hill Barn Golf Club	266	3 strokes	(England) Pip Elson	700	
Coca-Cola Young Professionals' Championship
1974	Dale Hayes	South Africa	Long Ashton Golf Club	274	1 stroke	(Australia) Jack Newton	1,400	
1973	Bernard Gallacher	Scotland	Bristol & Clifton Golf Club (and Long Ashton Golf Club)	277	4 strokes	(England) Peter Dawson	600	
1972	Peter Oosterhuis	England	Long Ashton Golf Club (and Bristol & Clifton Golf Club)	278	2 strokes	(England) John Cook		
1971	John Garner	England	Southampton Municipal Golf Club (and Stoneham Golf Club)	273	1 stroke	(England) Guy Hunt	600	
1970	Peter Oosterhuis	England	Morecambe Golf Club (and Heysham Golf Club)	274	1 stroke	(Northern Ireland) Eddie Polland	500	
1969	Brian Barnes	Scotland	Bristol & Clifton Golf Club (and Long Ashton Golf Club)	280	Playoff	(Scotland) Bernard Gallacher	500	
1968	Peter Townsend	England	Coventry Golf Club	270	3 strokes	(Scotland) Bernard Gallacher	500	

In 1969, Barnes beat Gallacher at the first extra hole with a birdie 3.
