= Piccadilly Medal =

Tournament information
- Location: Coventry, England
- Established: 1962
- Course: Coventry Golf Club
- Par: 73
- Tour: European Tour
- Format: Stroke play
- Prize fund: £40,000
- Month played: May
- Final year: 1976

Tournament record score
- Aggregate: 262 Bernard Hunt (1966)
- To par: −15 Sam Torrance (1976)

Final champion
- (Scotland) Sam Torrance
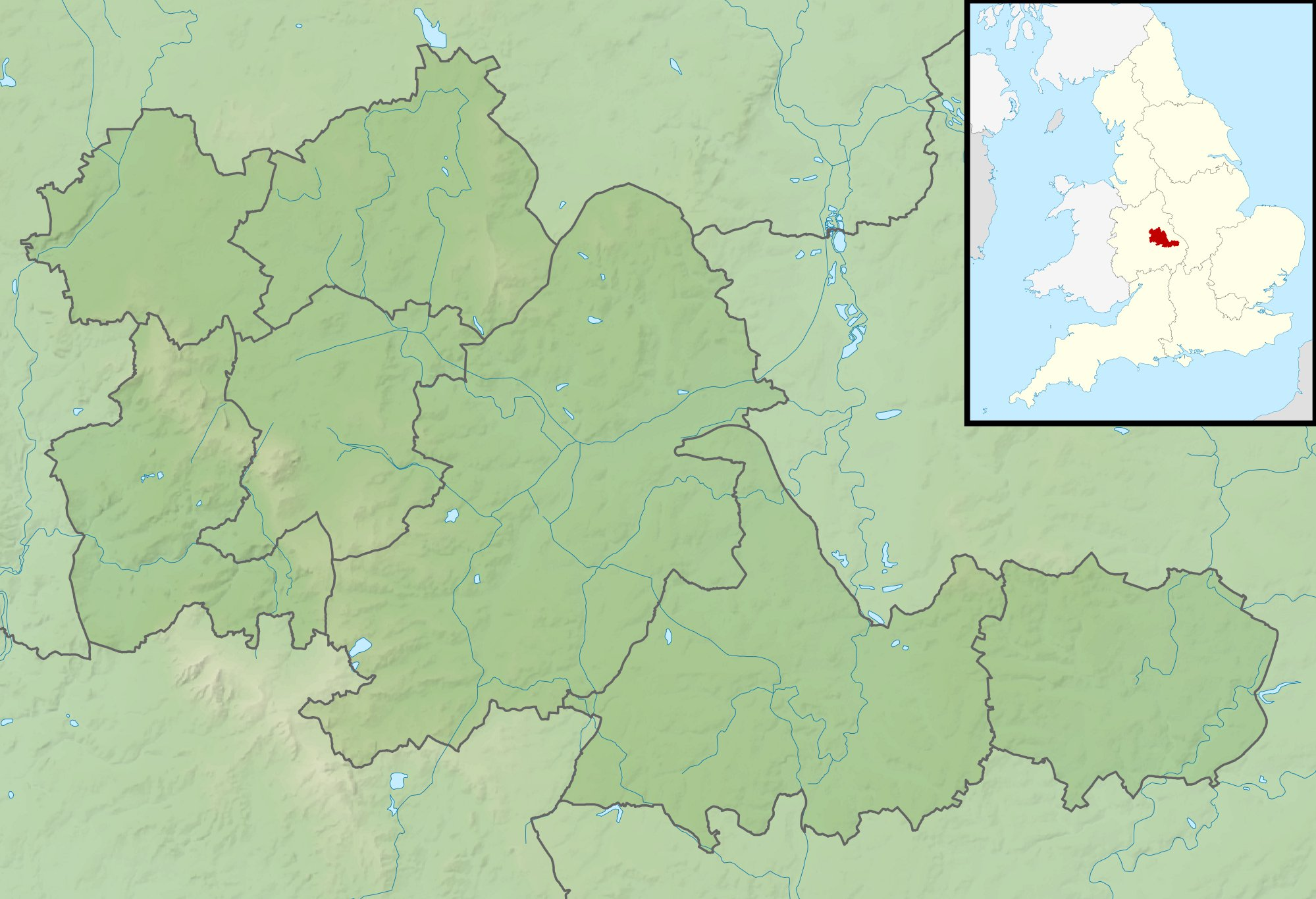
- Location in England Location in the West Midlands

Locations of the venues in England and Wales

The Piccadilly Medal was a men's professional golf tournament on the British PGA tournament circuit that was played in 1962 and from 1964 to 1976. Since the circuit later evolved into the European Tour, the tournament is recognised as an official European Tour event from 1972. It was played in a variety of formats. From 1962 to 1967 it was a 72-hole stroke-play event, in 1968 it was a four-ball better-ball match play event, from 1969 to 1975 it was a knockout stroke-play event while in 1976 it reverted to the 72-hole stroke-play format. From 1964 to 1968 the event was played on the East course at Wentworth, just before the Piccadilly World Match Play Championship which was played on the West Course there. Carreras withdrew their golf sponsorship after the 1976 season.

== History ==
The event started in 1962 as the Piccadilly Number One tournament. Total prize money was £8,000 with a first prize of £2,000. The £2,000 first prize was the largest ever for a British event, although the total prize was exceeded by the Open Championship's £8,500. The first two rounds were split between Hillside Golf Club and Southport and Ainsdale Golf Club, with one round played on each course. It was the first important professional tournament in Britain with a planned Sunday finish. The event marked the first British professional appearance of Jack Nicklaus. Nicklaus had a 79 in the first round and, although he made the cut, finished 15 strokes behind the winner.

The event planned for May 1963 was cancelled and replaced by the new Gevacolor Tournament with total prize money of £3,500.

In 1964 the Piccadilly World Match Play Championship was started on the West Course at Wentworth. From 1964 to 1968 another tournament was played on the East Course immediately before the World Match Play Championship. From 1964 to 1967 this was a 72-hole stroke-play event while in 1968 it was a four-ball better-ball match play tournament. The first tournament was played from 5 to 7 October 1964. The winner was Jimmy Martin who took home £750 of the total prize fund of £4,000. The 1965 event was played on 11 and 12 October and was won by Peter Butler. The 1966 event was played on 4 and 5 October and was won by Bernard Hunt. The 1967 event was played on 10 and 11 October. The winner was Peter Butler who won for the second time. Because there were no British golfers in the main event, there had been talk of a boycott of this event by some of the British golfers. In the end the PGA issued a statement and the boycott came to nothing.

The 72-hole stroke play competition which had been played on the East Course prior to the World Match Play Championship was replaced by a four-ball better-ball match play tournament. 32 pairs competed in the knock-out competition, each round over 18 holes of the East Course. The plan was to play the first round on Monday 7 October, followed by two rounds on each of the following two days. However, heavy rain on the second day meant that the third round could not be played that day and the final was delayed until Thursday 10 October, the same day as the opening round of the 1968 Piccadilly World Match Play Championship. The winners were Richard Emery and Hugh Jackson who beat Neil Coles and Bryon Hutchinson 2&1 in the final. The winners won £500 each out of the total prize money was £4,000.

In 1969 the event moved from Wentworth and became the Piccadilly Medal. This was a knockout stroke-play event with 64 players. The first round was on 16 July with two rounds on 17 and 18 July and a 36-hole final on 19 July. The same format was used in 1970 and 1971. In 1972 there was an 18-hole qualifying round at Southport and Ainsdale Golf Club prior to the knockout stage although three players (Jacklin, Coles and Oosterhuis) were given an exemption from qualifying. In 1973 qualifying was dropped and field increased to 128 with both the semi-finals and final played on the Saturday. The final event, in 1976, was a 72-hole stroke-play event. Total prize money was increased from £15,000 to £40,000.

== Winners ==
Year	Winner	Score	To par	Margin of victory	Runner(s)-up	Winner's share (£)	Venue	Ref.
Piccadilly Medal
1976	(Scotland) Sam Torrance	277	−15	2 strokes	(Australia) Bob Shearer	6,000	Coventry	
1975	(Australia) Bob Shearer	70	−3	19 holes	(South Africa) Andries Oosthuizen	2,500	Coventry	
1974	(England) Maurice Bembridge	65	−8	5 strokes	(England) Peter Oosterhuis	2,500	Coventry	
1973	(England) Peter Oosterhuis (2)	67	−6	6 strokes	(South Africa) Terry Westbrook	2,500	Coventry	
1972	(England) Tommy Horton	157	+13	1 stroke	(England) Guy Hunt	2,500	Hillside	
1971	(England) Peter Oosterhuis	Walkover			(Scotland) Eric Brown	1,500		
1970	(New Zealand) John Lister	134		3 strokes	(England) Tommy Horton	1,500	Southerndown	
1969	(England) Peter Alliss	149		37 holes	(Scotland) George Will	1,500	Prince's	
Piccadilly Fourball Match Play
1968	(England) Richard Emery and (Northern Ireland) Hugh Jackson	2 and 1			(England) Neil Coles and (England) Bryon Hutchinson	500 (each)		
Piccadilly Tournament
1967	(England) Peter Butler (2)	263		2 strokes	(Wales) Brian Huggett	750	Wentworth	
1966	(England) Bernard Hunt	262		2 strokes	(England) Peter Green	750	Wentworth	
1965	(England) Peter Butler	267		2 strokes	(Wales) Dai Rees	750	Wentworth	
1964	(Republic of Ireland) Jimmy Martin	268		2 strokes	(England) Bernard Hunt	750	Wentworth	
1963: No tournament
Piccadilly No. 1 Tournament
1962	(Australia) Peter Thomson	283		3 strokes	(Republic of Ireland) Christy O'Connor Snr	2,000	Hillside; Southport and Ainsdale	
