= Acorn Jersey Open =

Jersey Legends
Tournament information
- Location: Saint Brelade, Jersey
- Established: 1996
- Course: La Moye Golf Club
- Par: 72
- Length: 6,577 yards (6,014 m)
- Tour: European Senior Tour
- Format: Stroke play
- Prize fund: €300,000
- Month played: June

Tournament record score
- Aggregate: 201 Gordon Brand Jnr (2010)
- To par: −15 as above

Current champion
- (Australia) Richard Green

Final champion
- Location in the Channel Islands Location in Jersey

The Acorn Jersey Open was a men's senior (over 50) professional golf tournament on the European Senior Tour. It was held, under a number of different titles, from 1996 to 2010, before being played in 2015 and 2016 as the Acorn Jersey Open. It has always been played at La Moye Golf Club in Jersey. It indirectly replaced the Jersey Open, an event on the main European Tour which was staged at the same venue from 1978 to 1995.

== Winners ==
Year	Winner	Score	To par	Margin of victory	Runner(s)-up
Jersey Legends
2023	(Australia) Richard Green (2)	207	−9	1 stroke	(Scotland) Greig Hutcheon
2022	(Australia) Richard Green	206	−10	Playoff	(Scotland) Paul Lawrie
ICL Jersey Legends
2021	No tournament due to the COVID-19 pandemic				
2017–2020: No tournament
Acorn Jersey Open
2016	(Austria) Gordon Manson	206	−10	Playoff	(England) Gary Wolstenholme (Wales) Ian Woosnam
2015	(Australia) Peter Fowler	209	−7	1 stroke	(Sweden) Anders Forsbrand
2011–2014: No tournament
Matrix Jersey Classic
2010	(Scotland) Gordon Brand Jnr	201	−15	5 strokes	(South Africa) Bobby Lincoln (England) Carl Mason
Jersey Seniors Classic
2009	(Jamaica) Delroy Cambridge (2)	207	−9	Playoff	(Australia) Mike Clayton
2008	(Zimbabwe) Tony Johnstone	213	−3	2 strokes	(England) Gordon J. Brand (Scotland) Ross Drummond (Paraguay) Ángel Franco (South Africa) Bertus Smit
2007	(South Africa) Bobby Lincoln	205	−11	2 strokes	(Scotland) Bill Longmuir
Irvine Whitlock Seniors Classic
2006	(Chile) Guillermo Encina	209	−7	3 strokes	(United States) Rex Caldwell (New Zealand) Simon Owen (United States) Alan Tapie
2005	(Scotland) Sam Torrance	205	−11	4 strokes	(England) David J. Russell
Irvine Whitlock Jersey Seniors Classic
2004	(England) Jim Rhodes	205	−11	3 strokes	(Scotland) John Chillas
2003	(England) Malcolm Gregson	203	−13	3 strokes	(England) Bob Cameron
Microlease Jersey Seniors Masters
2002	(Jamaica) Delroy Cambridge	205	−11	2 strokes	(England) Tommy Horton (England) Ian Mosey
2001	(Japan) Seiji Ebihara	213	−3	Playoff	(Jamaica) Delroy Cambridge (England) Denis Durnian
Microlease Jersey Seniors Open
2000	(England) Neil Coles	207	−9	3 strokes	(United States) Jerry Bruner
Jersey Seniors Open
1999	(Northern Ireland) David Jones	208	−8	2 strokes	(Northern Ireland) Paul Leonard (England) Jim Rhodes
1998	(Australia) Bob Shearer	211	−5	2 strokes	(England) Tony Jacklin
1997	(England) Tommy Horton	204	−12	6 strokes	(Wales) Craig Defoy
Hippo Jersey Seniors
1996	(England) Maurice Bembridge	202	−14	7 strokes	(Italy) Roberto Bernardini (Italy) Alberto Croce (Scotland) David Huish (South Africa) Vincent Tshabalala
