= Travis Perkins Masters =

Men's over 50s professional golf tournament

Tournament information
- Location: Buckinghamshire, England
- Established: 2001
- Course: Woburn Golf and Country Club
- Par: 72
- Length: 6,906 yards (6,315 m)
- Tour: European Senior Tour
- Format: Stroke play
- Prize fund: £380,000
- Month played: August/September
- Final year: 2018

Tournament record score
- Aggregate: 204 Colin Montgomerie (2014); 204 Paul Streeter (2018)
- To par: −12 as above

Final champion
- (England) Paul Streeter
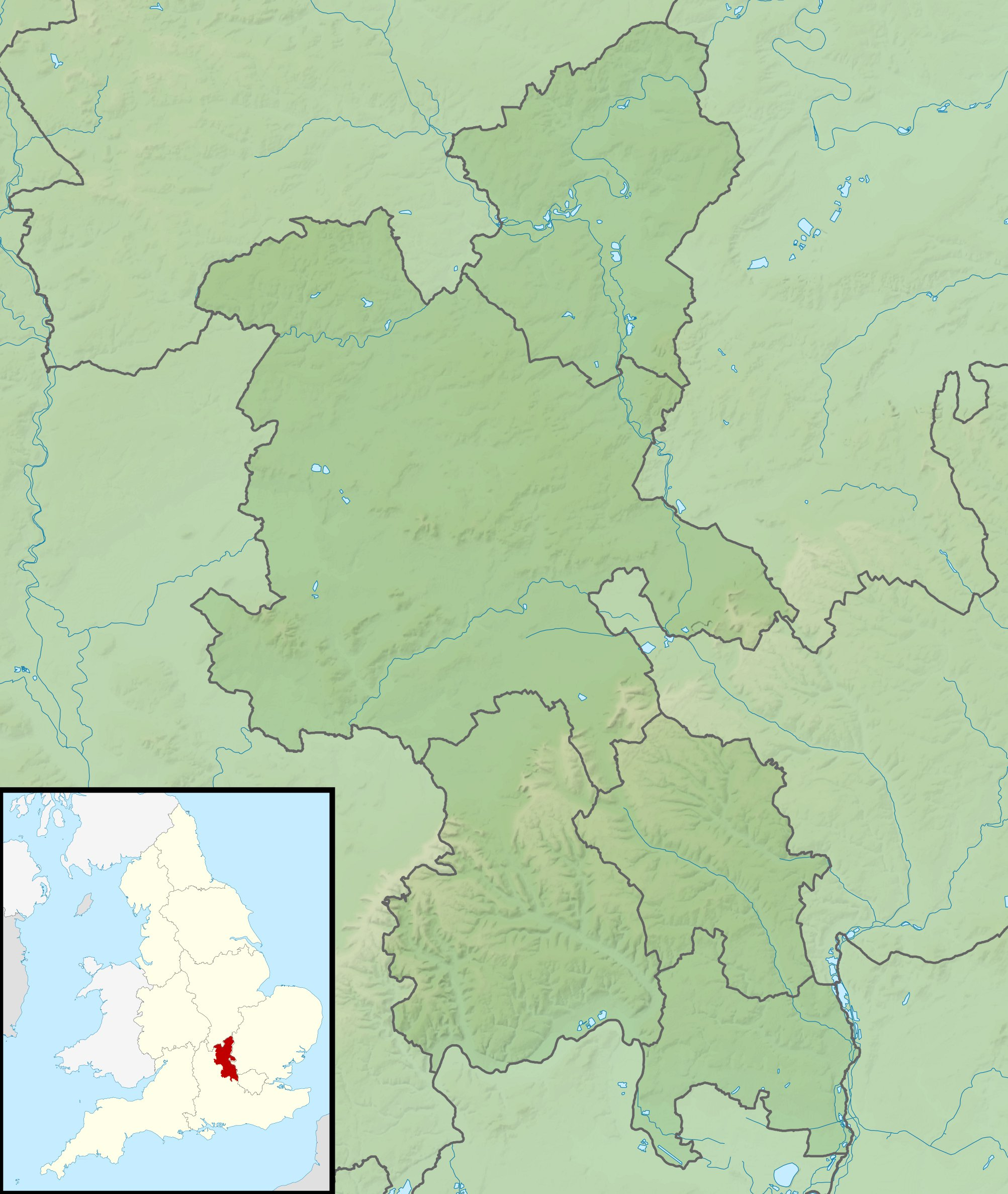
- Location in England Location in Buckinghamshire

The Travis Perkins Masters was a men's professional golf tournament for players aged 50 and above which is part of the European Senior Tour. It was founded in 2001 and is played on the Duke's course at Woburn Golf and Country Club near Milton Keynes, England.

== Winners ==
Year	Winner	Score	To par	Margin of victory	Runner(s)-up
Travis Perkins Masters
2018	(England) Paul Streeter	204	−12	2 strokes	(United States) Clark Dennis
2017	(England) Philip Golding	211	−5	1 stroke	(United States) Clark Dennis (Republic of Ireland) Brendan McGovern
2016	(Switzerland) André Bossert	208	−8	4 strokes	(England) Philip Golding (Wales) Ian Woosnam
2015	(Scotland) Colin Montgomerie (3)	211	−5	Playoff	(Scotland) Ross Drummond
2014	(Scotland) Colin Montgomerie (2)	204	−12	10 strokes	(Switzerland) André Bossert (Austria) Gordon Manson (United States) Tim Thelen
Travis Perkins plc Senior Masters
2013	(Scotland) Colin Montgomerie	206	−10	6 strokes	(Spain) Miguel Ángel Martín (England) Paul Wesselingh
2012	(Republic of Ireland) Des Smyth (2)	206	−10	1 stroke	(Australia) Peter Fowler
2011	(Thailand) Boonchu Ruangkit	207	−9	4 strokes	(Scotland) Gordon Brand Jnr (England) Roger Chapman (England) Barry Lane
2010	(Republic of Ireland) Des Smyth	206	−10	3 strokes	(England) Carl Mason
2009	(Zimbabwe) Tony Johnstone	206	−10	1 stroke	(Australia) Peter Senior
2008	(England) Gordon J. Brand	207	−9	2 strokes	(Spain) Juan Quirós
European Senior Masters
2007	(England) Carl Mason (2)	210	−6	Playoff	(Italy) Costantino Rocca
2006	(England) Carl Mason	209	−7	2 strokes	(Argentina) Horacio Carbonetti
Bovis Lend Lease European Senior Masters
2005	(England) Mark James	207	−9	Playoff	(Scotland) Sam Torrance
2004	(Argentina) Luis Carbonetti	209	−7	2 strokes	(Scotland) John Chillas
2003	(Northern Ireland) Paul Leonard	208	−8	1 stroke	(England) Nick Job (Scotland) Bill Longmuir
2002	(Jamaica) Delroy Cambridge	207	−9	2 strokes	(Republic of Ireland) Eamonn Darcy (Japan) Seiji Ebihara
STC Bovis Lend Lease European Invitational
2001	(Australia) Bob Shearer	208	−8	1 stroke	(Australia) Noel Ratcliffe
