= Nigel Mansell Sunseeker International Classic =

British golf tournament

Tournament information
- Location: Woodbury, East Devon, England
- Established: 2003
- Course: Woodbury Park Golf Club
- Par: 72
- Length: 6,925 yards (6,332 m)
- Tour: European Seniors Tour
- Format: Stroke play
- Prize fund: £150,000
- Month played: July
- Final year: 2005

Tournament record score
- Aggregate: 203 Seiji Ebihara (2004)
- To par: −13 as above

Final champion
- (England) Jim Rhodes
- Location in England Location in Devon

The Nigel Mansell Sunseeker International Classic was a men's professional golf tournament on the European Seniors Tour from 2003 to 2005. It was staged at Woodbury Park Golf Club, Woodbury, Devon, England. Total prize money was £150,000 with the winner receiving £22,500.

The event was hosted by the former motor-racing driver Nigel Mansell, who had had his 50th birthday just before the inaugural event and played as an amateur. In 2003 he finished 60th on 7 over par, in 2004 he finished tied for 62nd place at 10 over par while in 2005 he finished in 52nd place, again on 10 over par.

== Winners ==
Year	Winner	Score	To par	Margin of victory	Runner(s)-up
Nigel Mansell Sunseeker International Classic
2005	(England) Jim Rhodes	208	−8	3 strokes	(England) Tony Charnley
2004	(Japan) Seiji Ebihara	203	−13	2 strokes	(United States) David Oakley
Nigel Mansell Classic
2003	(Scotland) Mike Miller	205	−11	2 strokes	(Jamaica) Delroy Cambridge (England) Denis Durnian (Australia) Terry Gale (Republic of Ireland) Denis O'Sullivan (Australia) Ian Stanley
