= Mobile Cup =

Tournament information
- Location: Northampton, England
- Established: 2002
- Course: Collingtree Park Golf Club
- Par: 72
- Length: 6,726 yards (6,150 m)
- Tour: European Seniors Tour
- Format: Stroke play
- Prize fund: £125,000
- Month played: June
- Final year: 2005

Tournament record score
- Aggregate: 201 Bernard Gallacher (2002)
- To par: −12 as above

Final champion
- (Italy) Giuseppe Calì
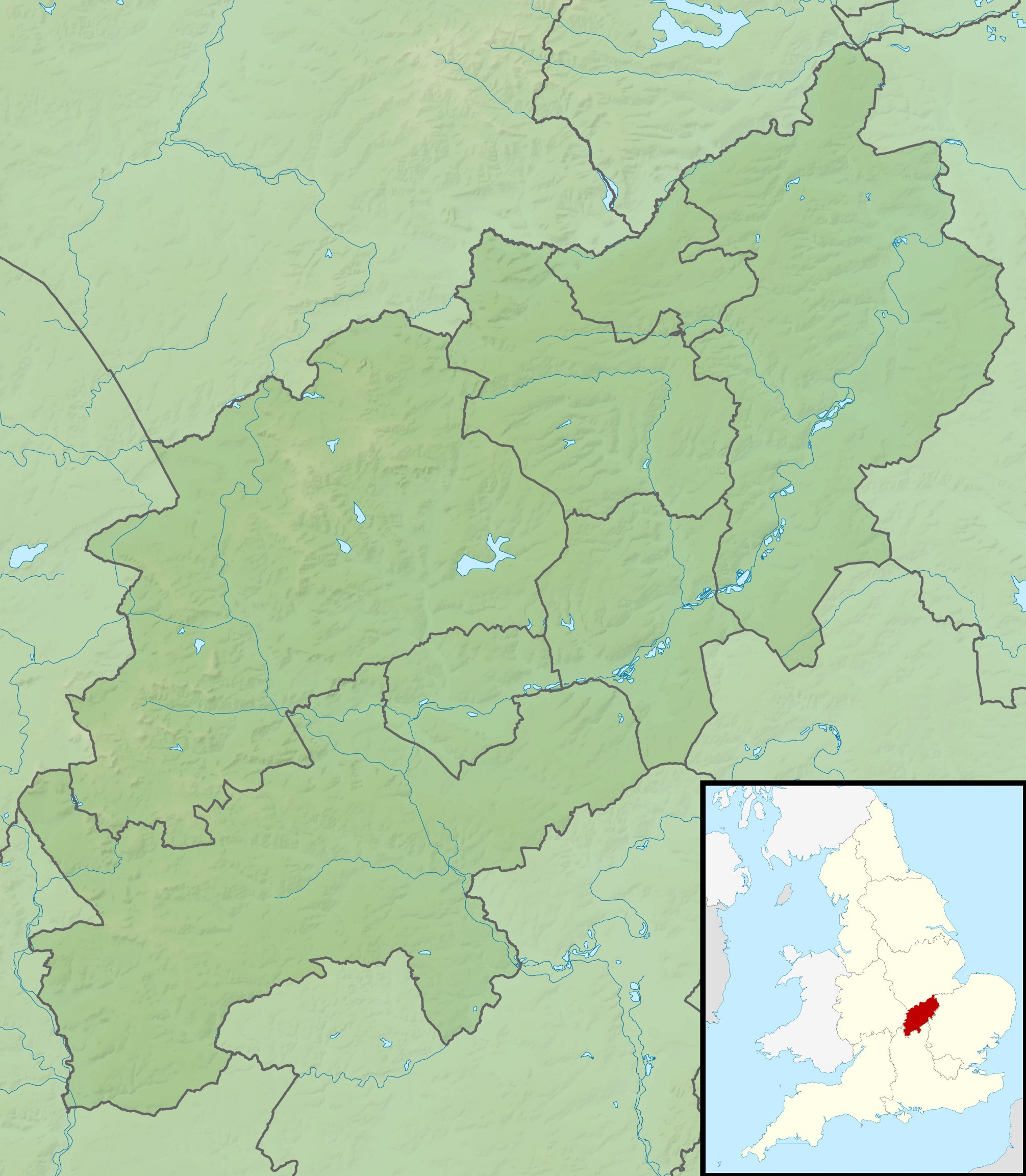
- Location in England Location in Northamptonshire

The Mobile Cup was a senior (over 50s) men's professional golf tournament played on the European Seniors Tour from 2002 to 2005. In 2002 and 2003 it was held at Stoke Park Golf Club, Stoke Poges, Buckinghamshire, in 2004 it was played at The Oxfordshire Golf Club, Thame, Oxfordshire, while in 2005 it was held at Collingtree Park Golf Club, Northampton. In 2002 Bernard Gallacher's victory was his only success on the European Seniors Tour. Carl Mason's win in 2003 was the first of his record 25 wins on the tour.

== Winners ==
Year	Winner	Score	To par	Margin of victory	Runner-up	Venue
2005	(Italy) Giuseppe Calì	208	−8	1 stroke	(Scotland) Martin Gray	Collingtree Park
2004	(Scotland) Bill Longmuir	207	−9	1 stroke	(Japan) Seiji Ebihara	The Oxfordshire
2003	(England) Carl Mason	203	−10	1 stroke	(England) Bob Cameron	Stoke Park
2002	(Scotland) Bernard Gallacher	201	−12	4 strokes	(Jamaica) Delroy Cambridge	Stoke Park
