= Gordon Brand =

Gordon Brand may refer to:

- Gordon Brand Jnr (1958–2019), Scottish golfer
- Gordon J. Brand (1955–2020), English golfer
