= OKI Open de España Senior =

Men's senior professional golf tournament

Tournament information
- Location: Murcia, Spain
- Established: 2011
- Course: El Valle Golf Resort
- Par: 71
- Length: 6,901 yards (6,310 m)
- Tour: European Senior Tour
- Format: Stroke play
- Prize fund: €200,000
- Month played: March
- Final year: 2011

Tournament record score
- Aggregate: 199 Carl Mason (2007)
- To par: −17 as above

Final champion
- (England) Carl Mason
- Location in Spain Location in Murcia

The OKI Open de España Senior was a men's senior (over 50) professional golf tournament on the European Senior Tour. It was held just once, in May 2011, at the El Valle Golf Resort, south of Murcia, Spain. The winner was Carl Mason who won the first prize of €30,000 out of total prize-money of €200,000.

== Winners ==
Year	Winner	Score	To par	Margin of victory	Runner(s)-up
OKI Open de España Senior
2011	(England) Carl Mason (2)	200	−13	4 strokes	(England) George Ryall
2006–2008: No tournament
OKI Castellón Open de España Senior
2007	(England) Carl Mason	199	−17	4 strokes	(Argentina) Luis Carbonetti
2006	(England) Gordon J. Brand	203	−13	2 strokes	(England) Carl Mason (Scotland) Sam Torrance
Castellon Costa Azahar Open de España
2005	(United States) Bob Boyd	205	−11	1 stroke	(England) Jim Rhodes (Spain) José Rivero
1995–2004: No tournament
La Manga Spanish Seniors Open
1994	(Wales) Brian Huggett	215	−1	Playoff	(England) Malcolm Gregson (England) David Snell
