= 2002 European Seniors Tour =

Golf tour season

2002 European Seniors Tour season
- Duration: 14 March 2002 – 27 October 2002
- Number of official events: 19
- Most wins: (Japan) Seiji Ebihara (3)
- Order of Merit: (Japan) Seiji Ebihara
- Rookie of the Year: (United States) Steve Stull

The 2002 European Seniors Tour was the 11th season of the European Seniors Tour, the main professional golf tour in Europe for men aged 50 and over.

== Schedule ==
The following table lists official events during the 2002 season.

Date	Tournament	Host country	Purse (€)	Winner (Note: The number in brackets after each winner's name is the number of European Seniors Tour events they had won up to and including that tournament. This information is only shown for European Seniors Tour members.)	Notes
16 Mar	Royal Westmoreland Barbados Open	Barbados	US$175,000	(England) Peter Townsend (1)	
22 Mar	Tobago Plantations Seniors Classic	Trinidad and Tobago	US$175,000	(United States) Steve Stull (1)	New tournament
19 May	AIB Irish Seniors Open	Ireland	310,000	(Japan) Seiji Ebihara (3)	
8 Jun	Legends in Golf	Belgium	170,000	(United States) Gary Wintz (1)	
16 Jun	Microlease Jersey Seniors Masters	Jersey	£100,000	(Jamaica) Delroy Cambridge (2)	
29 Jun	Lawrence Batley Seniors	England	£125,000	(England) Neil Coles (9)	
7 Jul	Wales Seniors Open	Wales	£500,000	(Japan) Seiji Ebihara (4)	
14 Jul	Mobile Cup	England	£125,000	(Scotland) Bernard Gallacher (1)	New tournament
28 Jul	Senior British Open	Northern Ireland	£500,000	(Japan) Noboru Sugai (1)	Senior major championship
4 Aug	De Vere PGA Seniors Championship	England	£200,000	(Japan) Seiji Ebihara (5)	
11 Aug	Bad Ragaz PGA Seniors Open	Switzerland	230,000	(Japan) Dragon Taki (1)	
18 Aug	Travis Perkins Senior Masters	England	£225,000	(United States) Ray Carrasco (1)	
1 Sep	De Vere Hotels Seniors Classic	England	£150,000	(Australia) Brian Jones (1)	
7 Sep	GIN Monte Carlo Invitational	France	220,000	(Australia) Terry Gale (2)	
15 Sep	Bovis Lend Lease European Senior Masters	England	£225,000	(Jamaica) Delroy Cambridge (3)	
22 Sep	Charles Church Scottish Seniors Open	Scotland	£150,000	(England) Denis Durnian (2)	
12 Oct	The Daily Telegraph Sodexho Seniors Match Play Championship	Spain	£100,000	(Jamaica) Delroy Cambridge (4)	
19 Oct	Tunisian Seniors Open	Tunisia	£100,000	(Republic of Ireland) Denis O'Sullivan (5)	
27 Oct	Estoril Seniors Tour Championship	Portugal	240,000	(England) Denis Durnian (3)	Tour Championship

=== Unofficial events ===
The following events were sanctioned by the European Seniors Tour, but did not carry official money, nor were wins official.

Date	Tournament	Host country	Purse (€)	Winners	Notes
17 Nov	UBS Cup	United States	US$3,000,000	Team USA	Team event

== Order of Merit ==
The Order of Merit was based on prize money won during the season, calculated in Euros.

Position	Player	Prize money (€)
1	(Japan) Seiji Ebihara	330,211
2	(England) Denis Durnian	259,983
3	(Jamaica) Delroy Cambridge	184,167
4	(England) John Morgan	157,216
5	(Republic of Ireland) Christy O'Connor Jnr	152,319

== Awards ==
Award	Winner	Ref.
Rookie of the Year	(United States) Steve Stull	
