= London Masters =

London Masters may refer to:

- London Masters (snooker) (1989–1991), a snooker tournament
- London Seniors Masters (1995 and 2005–2007), a golf tournament
