= Tobago Plantations Seniors Classic =

Tournament information
- Location: Lowlands, Trinidad and Tobago
- Established: 2002
- Courses: Tobago Plantations Beach & Golf Resort
- Par: 72
- Length: 6,776 yards (6,196 m)
- Tour: European Senior Tour
- Format: Stroke play
- Prize fund: US$250,000
- Month played: March
- Final year: 2005

Tournament record score
- Aggregate: 203 Terry Gale (2003)
- To par: −13 as above

Final champion
- (Argentina) Luis Carbonetti
- Location in Trinidad and Tobago

The Tobago Plantations Seniors Classic was a senior (over 50s) men's professional golf tournament played on the Caribbean island of Tobago, part of Trinidad and Tobago. It was an early season event on the European Seniors Tour, played annually from 2002 to 2005. It was hosted by the Tobago Plantations Golf Club, Lowlands, Tobago. The 2005 event had prize money of US$250,000 with the winner receiving $37,500.

== Winners ==
Year	Winner	Score	To par	Margin of victory	Runner(s)-up
2005	(Argentina) Luis Carbonetti	208	−8	2 strokes	(Argentina) Horacio Carbonetti (Scotland) Bill Longmuir
2004	(England) Carl Mason	207	−9	3 strokes	(Australia) David Good
2003	(Australia) Terry Gale	203	−13	3 strokes	(Scotland) John Chillas
2002	(United States) Steve Stull	205	−11	3 strokes	(Scotland) John Chillas (New Zealand) Barry Vivian
