= Giuseppe Cali =

Giuseppe Cali may refer to:

- Giuseppe Calì, Maltese painter
- Giuseppe Calì (golfer), Italian golfer
