= PGA Seniors Championship =

Golf tournament in the British Isles

Staysure PGA Seniors Championship
Tournament information
- Location: Balmedie, Aberdeenshire, Scotland
- Established: 1957
- Courses: Trump International Golf Links, Scotland (New Course)
- Par: 72
- Length: 6,921 yards (6,329 m)
- Tour: European Senior Tour
- Format: Stroke play
- Prize fund: €1,000,000
- Month played: July/August

Tournament record score
- Aggregate: 267 Seiji Ebihara (2002)
- To par: −21 as above

Current champion
- (South Africa) Darren Fichardt

Location map
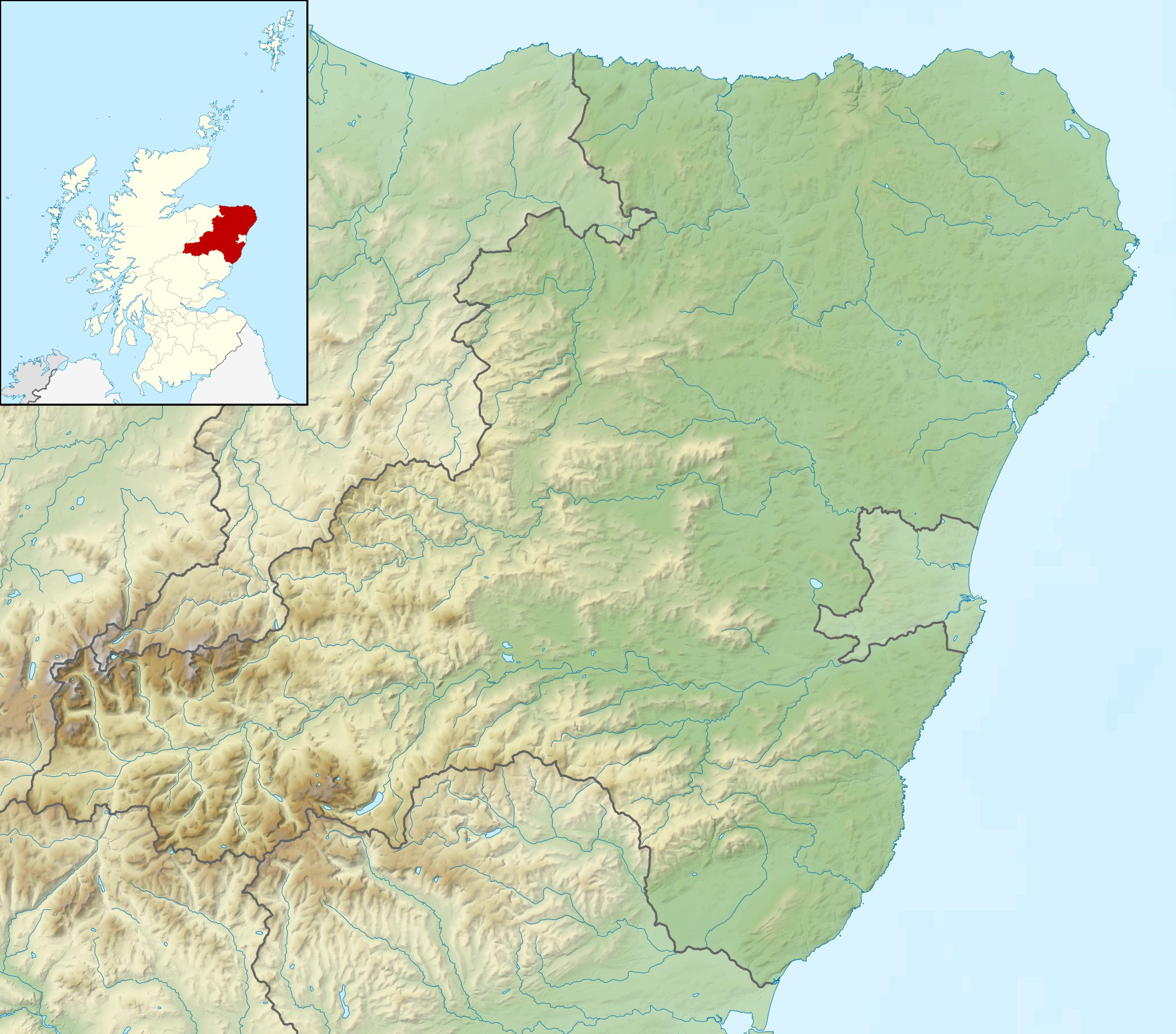
- Location in Scotland Location in Aberdeenshire

The PGA Seniors Championship is a European Senior Tour golf tournament for men aged fifty and above. It was founded in 1957 and became part of the European Senior Tour on its founding in 1992. It was not held in 2016 or 2017 but returned in 2018 as the Staysure PGA Seniors Championship.

It is the oldest important seniors tournament in Europe and, together with the Senior Open Championship, one of only two current events that predate the founding of the European Senior Tour in 1992. The PGA Seniors Championship and the Senior Open Championship are also the only two Europe-based events on the European Senior Tour that are played over 72 holes.

== History ==
From 1957 to 1966 the event was played over 54 holes. Since then it has been a 72-hole event with the exception of 1993 to 1995 when it was again played over 54 holes. In 1987 and 2012 it was reduced to 54 holes by bad weather.

From its foundation in 1957 until 1978 the winner played the winner of the American Senior PGA Championship for the World Senior Championship, a one-day 36-hole match-play event. The winner won the Teacher International Trophy.

== Venues ==
From 1957 to 1968 the event was held in England, except in 1967 when it was held at Ayr Belleisle in Scotland. From 1969 to 1974 the event was sponsored by Pringle of Scotland and played in Scotland. It was also played in Scotland in 1975 and 1976, from 1980 to 1982 and in 1988 but otherwise was held in England. It was played at the Royal Dublin Golf Club, Ireland in 1992, but from 1993 until 2022 it was played in various venues in England. In 2021 and 2022 it was played at Formby Golf Club, Liverpool with the addition of the celebrity pro-am format, before finding a new home at Trump International Golf Links, Scotland in Aberdeenshire.

== Winners ==
Year	Winner	Score	To par	Margin of victory	Runner(s)-up	Venue	Ref.
Staysure PGA Seniors Championship
2026	(South Africa) Darren Fichardt	276	−12	5 strokes	(Sweden) Mikael Lundberg	Trump International (New)	
2025	(United States) Bo Van Pelt	285	−3	Playoff	(South Africa) Darren Fichardt	Trump International (Old)	
2024	(England) Robert Coles	284	−4	1 stroke	(Scotland) Paul Lawrie	Trump International (Old)	
2023	(England) Peter Baker	276	−12	6 strokes	(England) Greg Owen	Trump International (Old)	
2022	(Brazil) Adilson da Silva	270	−18	6 strokes	(Sweden) Joakim Haeggman	Formby	
2021	(England) Paul Broadhurst	281	−7	1 stroke	(England) John Bickerton (France) Thomas Levet	Formby	
2020: No tournament
2019	(Wales) Phillip Price	271	−17	2 strokes	(New Zealand) Michael Campbell (South Africa) James Kingston (Australia) Peter Lonard	London (International)	
2018	(England) Philip Golding	270	−18	2 strokes	(Sweden) Magnus Persson Atlevi	London (International)	
ISPS Handa PGA Seniors Championship
2016–17: No tournament
2015	(Australia) Peter Fowler	272	−12	3 strokes	(Austria) Gordon Manson	Close House (Lee Westwood Colt)	
2014	(Spain) Santiago Luna	270	−14	2 strokes	(Denmark) Steen Tinning	Stoke-by-Nayland (Gainsborough)	
2013	(England) Paul Wesselingh (2)	272	−20	4 strokes	(Paraguay) Ángel Franco	Mottram Hall	
2012	(England) Paul Wesselingh	210 (Note: Shortened to 54 holes due to weather.)	−6	1 stroke	(Sweden) Anders Forsbrand (Scotland) Andrew Oldcorn	Slaley Hall (Hunting)	
De Vere Club PGA Seniors Championship
2011	(Scotland) Andrew Oldcorn	277	−11	9 strokes	(Scotland) Gordon Brand Jnr	Slaley Hall (Hunting)	
De Vere Collection PGA Seniors Championship
2010	(England) David J. Russell	283	−5	2 strokes	(Paraguay) Ángel Franco (England) Barry Lane (South Africa) Chris Williams	Slaley Hall (Hunting)	
2009	(England) Carl Mason (3)	279	−9	3 strokes	(Paraguay) Ángel Franco (South Africa) Chris Williams	Slaley Hall (Hunting)	
2008	(England) Gordon J. Brand	292	+4	Playoff	(Scotland) Gordon Brand Jnr	Slaley Hall (Hunting)	
PGA Seniors Championship
2007	(England) Carl Mason (2)	268	−20	6 strokes	(France) Philippe Dugeny (Italy) Costantino Rocca	Stoke-by-Nayland (Gainsborough)	
2006	(Scotland) Sam Torrance (2)	268	−20	3 strokes	(Argentina) Luis Carbonetti	Stoke-by-Nayland (Gainsborough)	
De Vere PGA Seniors Championship
2005	(Scotland) Sam Torrance	271	−17	4 strokes	(England) David J. Russell	Carden Park	
2004	(England) Carl Mason	275	−13	Playoff	(Japan) Seiji Ebihara (England) Jim Rhodes	Carden Park	
2003	(Scotland) Bill Longmuir	271	−17	2 strokes	(England) Carl Mason (Republic of Ireland) Denis O'Sullivan	Carden Park	
2002	(Japan) Seiji Ebihara	267	−21	10 strokes	(United States) George Burns (United States) Steve Stull	Carden Park	
2001	(Australia) Ian Stanley	278	−10	2 strokes	(England) Maurice Bembridge	Carden Park	
The Belfry PGA Seniors Championship
2000	(United States) John Grace	282	−6	Playoff	(England) Peter Dawson	The Belfry (PGA National)	
1999	(Australia) Ross Metherell	276	−12	1 stroke	(United States) Bill Brask	The Belfry (PGA National)	
1998	(England) Tommy Horton (2)	277	−11	2 strokes	(Italy) Renato Campagnoli (England) Jim Rhodes	The Belfry (PGA National)	
1997	(United States) Walter Hall	277	−11	3 strokes	(England) Tommy Horton	The Belfry (Brabazon)	
1996	(Australia) Terry Gale	284	−4	1 stroke	(England) Tommy Horton	The Belfry (Brabazon)	
Forte PGA Seniors Championship
1995	(England) John Morgan (2)	204	−6	Playoff	(Spain) Antonio Garrido	Sunningdale (Old)	
1994	(England) John Morgan	203	−7	2 strokes	(England) David Creamer	Sunningdale (Old)	
1993	(Wales) Brian Huggett	204	−6	3 strokes	(South Africa) Bobby Verwey	Sunningdale (Old)	
1992	(England) Tommy Horton	290	+2	Playoff	(England) Tony Grubb (Republic of Ireland) Christy O'Connor Snr	Royal Dublin	
Trusthouse Forte PGA Seniors Championship
1991	(England) Brian Waites (2)	277	−7	3 strokes	(England) Neil Coles	Wollaton Park	
1990	(England) Brian Waites	269	−3	4 strokes	(England) Neil Coles	Brough	
1989	(England) Neil Coles (4)	277	+1	4 strokes	(England) Peter Butler	West Hill	
1988	(Australia) Peter Thomson	287	+7	2 strokes	(South Africa) Denis Hutchinson	North Berwick	
1987	(England) Neil Coles (3)	206	−13	4 strokes	(Australia) Peter Thomson	Coventry	
1986	(England) Neil Coles (2)	276	−4	1 stroke	(England) Peter Butler	Mere	
1985	(England) Neil Coles	284	−4	2 strokes	(Republic of Ireland) Christy O'Connor Snr	Pannal	
1984	(Republic of Ireland) Ernie Jones	280	−8	3 strokes	(England) Peter Butler (England) Ross Whitehead	Stratford-on-Avon	
1983	(Republic of Ireland) Christy O'Connor Snr (6)	277	−7	9 strokes	(England) Peter Gill	Burnham & Berrow	
1982	(Republic of Ireland) Christy O'Connor Snr (5)	285	+13	Playoff	(England) Peter Butler (Scotland) Alex Mitchell (Australia) Guy Wolstenholme	Longniddry	
1981	(Republic of Ireland) Christy O'Connor Snr (4)	287	+3	Playoff	(England) Fred Boobyer	North Berwick	
PGA Seniors Championship
1980	(Republic of Ireland) Paddy Skerritt (2)	286	+6	5 strokes	(Scotland) Doug Beattie	Gleneagles (King's)	
1979	(Republic of Ireland) Christy O'Connor Snr (3)	280	−8	Playoff	(Argentina) Roberto De Vicenzo	Cambridgeshire Moat House	
1978	(Republic of Ireland) Paddy Skerritt	288	E	1 stroke	(Argentina) Roberto De Vicenzo (Republic of Ireland) Jimmy Martin	Cambridgeshire Moat House	
1977	(Republic of Ireland) Christy O'Connor Snr (2)	284	−4	3 strokes	(Argentina) Roberto De Vicenzo	Cambridgeshire Moat House	
1976	(Republic of Ireland) Christy O'Connor Snr	276	−8	4 strokes	(Australia) Kel Nagle	North Berwick	
1975	(Australia) Kel Nagle (3)	268	−4	2 strokes	(England) Ken Bousfield	Longniddry	
Pringle of Scotland Seniors Championship
1974	(England) Eric Lester	282	−2	4 strokes	(England) Ken Bousfield	Lundin Links	
1973	(Australia) Kel Nagle (2)	270	−10	1 stroke	(Argentina) Roberto De Vicenzo	Elie	
1972	(England) Ken Bousfield	291	+15	Playoff	(Italy) Alfonso Angelini	Longniddry	
1971	(Australia) Kel Nagle	269	−11	6 strokes	(England) Ken Bousfield (Scotland) John Panton	Elie	
1970	(England) Max Faulkner (2)	288	+12	1 stroke	(Wales) Dai Rees	Longniddry	
1969	(Scotland) John Panton (2)	281	−3	8 strokes	(Wales) Dai Rees	West Kilbride	
Teacher's Seniors Championship
1968	(England) Max Faulkner	283	+11	3 strokes	(Scotland) John Panton	Aldeburgh	
1967	(Scotland) John Panton	282	+2	5 strokes	(Belgium) Flory Van Donck	Ayr Belleisle	
1966	(Wales) Dai Rees	215	−1	Playoff	(Belgium) Flory Van Donck	Coventry	
1965	(England) Charlie Ward	210	E	2 strokes	(Wales) Dai Rees	Ashford Manor	
1964	(England) Syd Scott	213		1 stroke	(Wales) Dai Rees	Northumberland	
1963	(England) George Evans	222		1 stroke	(England) Norman Sutton	Weston-super-Mare	
1962	(England) Sam King (2)	214		2 strokes	(England) Fred Daly	Harrogate	
1961	(England) Sam King	208		Playoff	(Scotland) Allan Dailey	Hill Barn	
1960	(England) Reg Horne	213		3 strokes	(England) Norman Sutton	Mere	
1959	(England) Arthur Lees	204		6 strokes	(England) Jack Jacobs	Royal Mid-Surrey (Outer)	
1958	(England) Norman Sutton	214		3 strokes	(England) Jack Jacobs	Copt Heath	
1957	(England) John Burton	213		5 strokes	(England) Joe Baker (England) Wally Smithers	Fulwell	
