= 2005 European Seniors Tour =

Golf tour season

2005 European Seniors Tour season
- Duration: 2 March 2005 – 12 November 2005
- Number of official events: 23
- Most wins: (Scotland) Sam Torrance (3)
- Order of Merit: (Scotland) Sam Torrance
- Rookie of the Year: (England) Kevin Spurgeon

The 2005 European Seniors Tour was the 14th season of the European Seniors Tour, the main professional golf tour in Europe for men aged 50 and over.

== Schedule ==
The following table lists official events during the 2005 season.

Date	Tournament	Host country	Purse (€)	Winner (Note: The number in brackets after each winner's name is the number of European Seniors Tour events they had won up to and including that tournament. This information is only shown for European Seniors Tour members.)	Notes
4 Mar	DGM Barbados Open	Barbados	US$250,000	(Republic of Ireland) Denis O'Sullivan (6)	
13 Mar	Tobago Plantations Seniors Classic	Trinidad and Tobago	US$250,000	(Argentina) Luis Carbonetti (3)	
23 Apr	Jolie Ville Sharm El Sheikh Seniors Open	Egypt	US$255,000	(United States) Bob Lendzion (2)	New tournament
22 May	Nokia 9300 Italian Seniors Open	Italy	170,000	(France) Géry Watine (1)	
29 May	Senior PGA Championship	United States	US$2,000,000	(United States) Mike Reid (n/a)	Senior major championship (Note: Official win; unofficial money.)
5 Jun	AIB Irish Seniors Open	Ireland	400,000	(Australia) Noel Ratcliffe (8)	
12 Jun	Irvine Whitlock Seniors Classic	Jersey	£120,000	(Scotland) Sam Torrance (2)	
19 Jun	Mobile Cup	England	£125,000	(Italy) Giuseppe Calì (1)	
26 Jun	De Vere Northumberland Seniors Classic	England	£150,000	(England) Carl Mason (10)	
3 Jul	Ryder Cup Wales Seniors Open	Wales	£500,000	(England) Carl Mason (10)	
10 Jul	Nigel Mansell Sunseeker International Classic	England	£150,000	(England) Jim Rhodes (3)	
24 Jul	The Senior British Open Championship	Scotland	US$1,800,000	(United States) Tom Watson (n/a)	Senior major championship
31 Jul	U.S. Senior Open	United States	US$2,600,000	(United States) Allen Doyle (n/a)	Senior major championship
7 Aug	De Vere PGA Seniors Championship	England	£200,000	(Scotland) Sam Torrance (3)	
14 Aug	Bad Ragaz PGA Seniors Open	Switzerland	210,000	(Australia) Terry Gale (7)	
21 Aug	Travis Perkins Senior Masters	England	£225,000	(Argentina) Eduardo Romero (1)	
28 Aug	Charles Church Scottish Seniors Open	Scotland	£150,000	(England) Nick Job (3)	
4 Sep	Bovis Lend Lease European Senior Masters	England	£225,000	(England) Mark James (1)	
11 Sep	Scandinavian Senior Open	Denmark	250,000	(Scotland) Bill Longmuir (5)	New tournament
25 Sep	Bendinat London Seniors Masters	England	£150,000	(Scotland) Sam Torrance (4)	
2 Oct	Castellon Costa Azahar Open de España	Spain	250,000	(United States) Bob Boyd (1)	
9 Oct	Algarve Seniors Open of Portugal	Portugal	300,000	(United States) Jerry Bruner (3)	New tournament
12 Nov	Arcapita Seniors Tour Championship	Bahrain	US$450,000	(Republic of Ireland) Des Smyth (1)	Tour Championship

== Order of Merit ==
The Order of Merit was based on prize money won during the season, calculated in Euros.

Position	Player	Prize money (€)
1	(Scotland) Sam Torrance	277,421
2	(England) Carl Mason	257,114
3	(Republic of Ireland) Des Smyth	229,515
4	(Argentina) Luis Carbonetti	199,412
5	(England) Nick Job	192,690

== Awards ==
Award	Winner	Ref.
Rookie of the Year	(England) Kevin Spurgeon	
