= Margara Golf Open =

San Paolo Vita & Asset Management Open
Tournament information
- Location: Fubine, Italy
- Established: 1982
- Course: Golf Club Margara
- Par: 72
- Length: 6,780 yards (6,200 m)
- Tour: Challenge Tour
- Format: Stroke play
- Prize fund: €125,000
- Month played: October
- Final year: 2001

Tournament record score
- Aggregate: 265 Giuseppe Calì (1990)
- To par: −23 as above

Final champion
- (Denmark) Mads Vibe-Hastrup

Location map
- Location in Italy Location in Piedmont

The Margara Golf Open was a golf tournament on the Challenge Tour. It was played annually from 1982 to 2001 at Golf Club Margara in Fubine, Italy.

== Winners ==
Year	Winner	Score	To par	Margin of victory	Runner(s)-up
San Paolo Vita & Asset Management Open
2001	(Denmark) Mads Vibe-Hastrup	267	−21	1 stroke	(Italy) Alberto Binaghi (Sweden) Pehr Magnebrant
San Paolo Vita Open
2000	(Sweden) Dennis Edlund	273	−15	1 stroke	(Italy) Marcelo Santi
1999	(Italy) Alberto Binaghi	278	−10	1 stroke	(Sweden) Mattias Eliasson (Italy) Roberto Paolillo
1998	(England) Roger Winchester	272	−16	1 stroke	(Italy) Emanuele Canonica
1997	(Australia) Mathew Goggin	269	−19	1 stroke	(Sweden) Henrik Nyström
Club Med Open
1996	(Spain) Ignacio Feliu	271	−17	4 strokes	(Sweden) Max Anglert
1995	(Italy) Emanuele Bolognesi (2)	271	−17	3 strokes	(France) Olivier Edmond
1994	(Northern Ireland) Raymond Burns	277	−11	1 stroke	(France) Christian Cévaër (France) Pascal Edmond (United States) Robert Huxtable
1993	(Sweden) Klas Eriksson	278	−10	2 strokes	(England) Neal Briggs
1992	(Wales) Mark Litton	279	−9	1 stroke	(Wales) Paul Affleck
Cerutti Open
1991	(England) Jonathan Sewell	281	−7		(Spain) Ignacio Feliu (Italy) Silvio Grappasonni
1990	(Italy) Giuseppe Calì (3)	265	−23	12 strokes	(England) David James
1989	(Italy) Alberto Binaghi				
1988	(Italy) Giuseppe Calì (2)				
1987	(South Africa) Wilhelm Winsnes				
1986	(Italy) Emanuele Bolognesi				
1985	(Italy) Baldovino Dassù				
1984	(Italy) Pietro Molteni				
1983	(Italy) Maurizio Guerisoli				
1982	(Italy) Giuseppe Calì				
