= Carl Mason =

English professional golfer

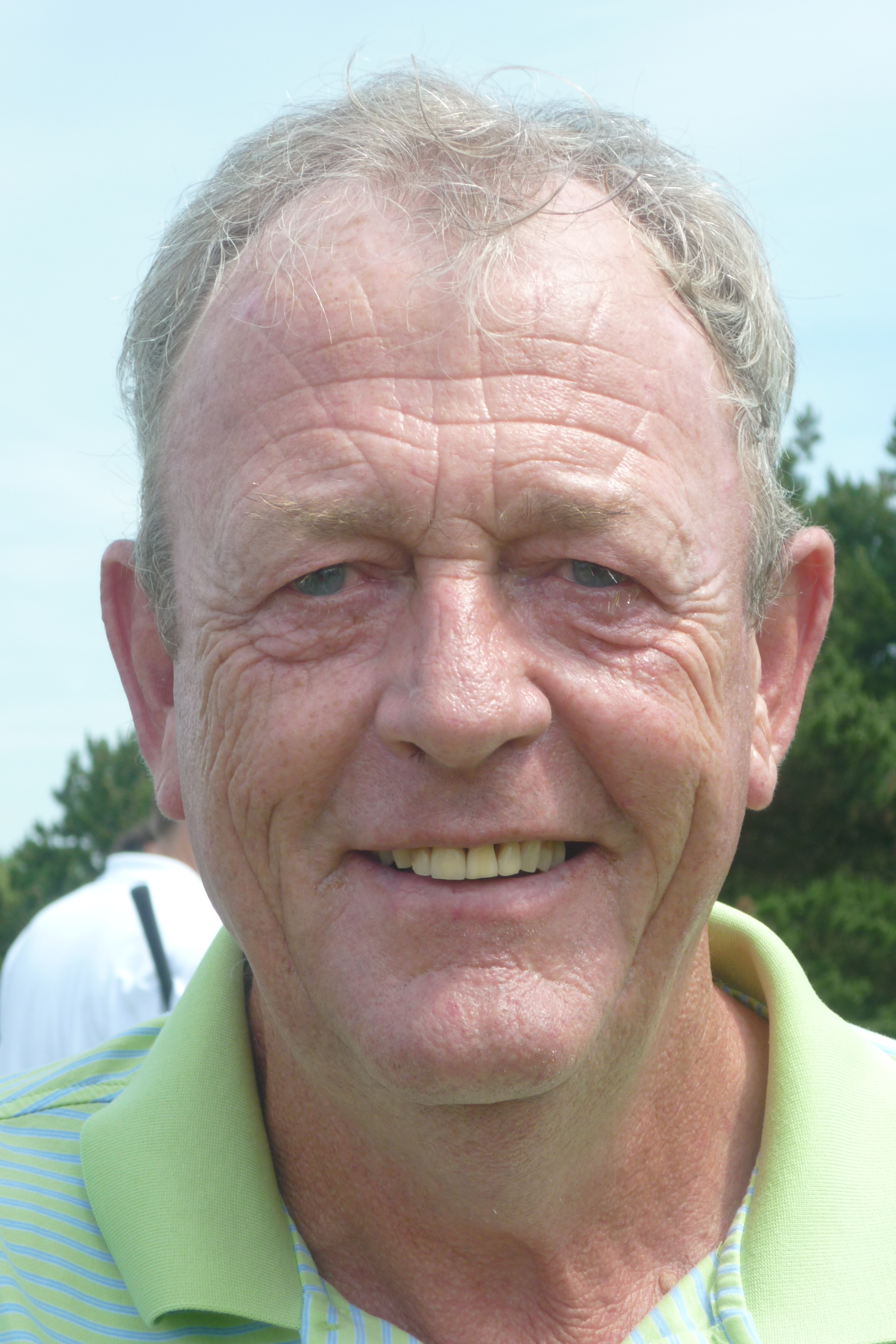

Personal information
- Full name: Stuart Carl Mason
- Nationality: England
- Born: 25 June 1953 (age 73) Buxton, Derbyshire, England
- Height: 6 ft 1 in (1.85 m)
- Spouse: Beryl

Career
- Sport: Golf
- Turned professional: 1973
- Current tour: European Senior Tour
- Former tour: European Tour
- Professional wins: 31
- Highest ranking: 83 (8 January 1995)

Number of wins by tour
- European Tour: 2
- European Senior Tour: 25 (1st all-time)
- Other: 1

Best results in major championships
- Masters Tournament: DNP
- PGA Championship: DNP
- U.S. Open: DNP
- The Open Championship: T4: 1980

Achievements and awards
- Sir Henry Cotton Rookie of the Year: 1974
- European Seniors Tour Rookie of the Year: 2003
- European Seniors Tour Order of Merit winner: 2003, 2004, 2007

Stuart Carl Mason (born 25 June 1953) is an English professional golfer. Mason was something of a journeyman on the European Tour. After twenty years of trying he finally won on tour for the first time in 1994. His biggest successes, however, came after turning 50. He picked up 25 tournament victories on the European Senior Tour and headed the Order of Merit three times, becoming the leading career money winner on the tour.

== Career ==
In 1953, Mason was born in Buxton, Derbyshire. He won several amateur tournaments before turning professional.

Mason turned professional in 1973, following an outstanding amateur career playing out of Goring & Streatley Golf Club, and was a rookie on the European Tour the following year. He finished in 67th place on the Order of Merit that year and was a recipient of the Sir Henry Cotton Rookie of the Year award. He made the top 100 on the European Tour Order of Merit twenty three years in a row up to 1996, with a best ranking of 19th in 1994. In 1980, he finished tied for 4th with Jack Nicklaus in The Open Championship held at Muirfield.

Despite those successes, Mason only won twice on the European Tour, both times in 1994. His first victory came at the 455th attempt, in the Turespana Masters Open de Andalucia, and the second in the Scottish Open just a few months later. He also won three times on the Safari Circuit in Africa.

=== Senior career ===
After a spell working for the PGA European Tour as a tournament referee, he joined the European Senior Tour on turning fifty. He was immediately successful as a senior, winning four of his first eleven events and topping the Order of Merit in 2003 and 2004. He was Order of Merit runner-up in each of the following two seasons before recapturing the top spot in 2007. That year, after winning the European Senior Masters, he surpassed Tommy Horton as the highest career money earner on the European Seniors Tour. The next week he won the PGA Seniors Championship, and went on to finish the 2007 season with earnings of €412,376, a new record for money won in a season on the tour, breaking his previous record of €354,775 set in 2004.

In 2010, he won his 23rd EST event, which placed him in a tie with Tommy Horton for the most EST wins. In May 2011, Mason who his 24th event, the OKI Open de Espana Senior. He won his 25th event at the Benahavis Senior Masters in October 2011.

== Amateur wins ==
- 1973 Berkhamsted Trophy, Hampshire Hog, British Youths Open Amateur Championship, West of England Open Amateur Stroke Play Championship, West of England Amateur Championship

== Professional wins (30) ==
=== European Tour wins (2) ===
| No. | Date | Tournament | Winning score | Margin of victory | Runner-up |
|---|---|---|---|---|---|
| 1 | 27 Feb 1994 | Turespaña Masters Open de Andalucía | −10 (67-70-71-70=278) | 2 strokes | (Spain) José María Olazábal |
| 2 | 9 Jul 1994 | Bell's Scottish Open | −15 (67-69-61-68=265) | 1 stroke | (England) Peter Mitchell |

=== Safari Circuit wins (2) ===
| No. | Date | Tournament | Winning score | Margin of victory | Runner(s)-up |
|---|---|---|---|---|---|
| 1 | 25 Mar 1984 | Zambia Open | −12 (69-70-69-72=280) | 2 strokes | (England) Roger Chapman |
| 2 | 1 Mar 1987 | 555 Kenya Open | −9 (72-68-67-68=275) | Playoff | (England) Gordon J. Brand, (England) Roger Chapman, (England) Martin Poxon |

=== Other wins (2) ===
- 1975 Lusaka Open
- 1999 Farmfoods British Par 3 Championship

=== European Senior Tour wins (25) ===
Legend
Tour Championships (1)
Other European Senior Tour (24)

| No. | Date | Tournament | Winning score | Margin of victory | Runner(s)-up |
|---|---|---|---|---|---|
| 1 | 13 Jul 2003 | Mobile Cup | −10 (69-66-68=203) | 1 stroke | (England) Bob Cameron |
| 2 | 20 Sep 2003 | The Daily Telegraph Turismo Andaluz; Seniors Match Play Championship | 1 up | | (Republic of Ireland) Denis O'Sullivan |
| 3 | 28 Sep 2003 | Merseyside English Seniors Open | −8 (71-66-71=208) | 1 stroke | (Scotland) Bill Longmuir, (Republic of Ireland) Denis O'Sullivan |
| 4 | 12 Oct 2003 | Estoril Seniors Tour Championship | −11 (64-73-65=202) | 8 strokes | (England) Keith MacDonald, (Australia) Noel Ratcliffe, (Japan) Dragon Taki |
| 5 | 21 Mar 2004 | Tobago Plantations Seniors Classic | −9 (71-64-72=207) | 3 strokes | (Australia) David Good |
| 6 | 6 Jun 2004 | AIB Irish Seniors Open | −10 (68-69-69=206) | 1 stroke | (England) Nick Job |
| 7 | 8 Aug 2004 | De Vere PGA Seniors Championship | −13 (67-71-69-68=275) | Playoff | (Japan) Seiji Ebihara, (England) Jim Rhodes |
| 8 | 11 Sep 2004 | The Daily Telegraph Turismo Andaluz; European Seniors Match Play Championship (2) | 3 and 2 | | (Scotland) John Chillas |
| 9 | 26 Sep 2004 | ADT English Seniors Open (2) | −3 (71-67-75=213) | 3 strokes | (England) Bob Cameron, (Scotland) John Chillas |
| 10 | 26 Jun 2005 | De Vere Northumberland Seniors Classic | −16 (68-63-69=200) | 3 strokes | (Republic of Ireland) Eamonn Darcy |
| 11 | 3 Jul 2005 | Ryder Cup Wales Seniors Open | −5 (68-69-65=202) | 5 strokes | (New Zealand) Bob Charles, (Republic of Ireland) Denis O'Sullivan |
| 12 | 10 Sep 2006 | European Senior Masters | −7 (73-67-69=209) | 2 strokes | (Argentina) Horacio Carbonetti |
| 13 | 17 Sep 2006 | Midas Group English Seniors Open (3) | −4 (70-71-71=212) | 1 stroke | (Australia) Stewart Ginn |
| 14 | 22 Oct 2006 | Estoril Seniors Open of Portugal | −9 (64-69-71=204) | 4 strokes | (Australia) Stewart Ginn, (Scotland) Sam Torrance |
| 15 | 17 Jun 2007 | Ryder Cup Wales Seniors Open (2) | −6 (73-69-68=210) | 2 strokes | (Scotland) Ross Drummond, (Spain) Juan Quirós |
| 16 | 12 Aug 2007 | Bad Ragaz PGA Seniors Open | −16 (65-64-65=194) | 6 strokes | (Argentina) Horacio Carbonetti, (Italy) Costantino Rocca, (England) David J. Russell |
| 17 | 2 Sep 2007 | European Senior Masters (2) | −6 (71-66-73=210) | Playoff | (Italy) Costantino Rocca |
| 18 | 9 Sep 2007 | PGA Seniors Championship (2) | −20 (67-67-67-67=268) | 6 strokes | (France) Philippe Dugeny, (Italy) Costantino Rocca |
| 19 | 21 Oct 2007 | OKI Castellón Open de España Senior | −17 (66-68-65=199) | 4 strokes | (Argentina) Luis Carbonetti |
| 20 | 10 Aug 2008 | Bad Ragaz PGA Seniors Open (2) | −15 (69-61-65=195) | 2 strokes | (Scotland) Bill Longmuir |
| 21 | 28 Jun 2009 | De Vere Collection PGA Seniors Championship (3) | −9 (73-70-67-69=279) | 3 strokes | (Paraguay) Ángel Franco, (South Africa) Chris Williams |
| 22 | 18 Oct 2009 | Benahavis Senior Masters | −7 (66-72-68=206) | Playoff | (Scotland) Gordon Brand Jnr |
| 23 | 4 Jul 2010 | Bad Ragaz PGA Seniors Open (3) | −11 (64-67-68=199) | 2 strokes | (United States) Jerry Bruner |
| 24 | 20 May 2011 | OKI Open de España Senior (2) | −13 (67-65-68=200) | 4 strokes | (England) George Ryall |
| 25 | 16 Oct 2011 | Benahavis Senior Masters (2) | −9 (70-65-69=204) | 3 strokes | (England) Mark James, (England) Gary Wolstenholme |

European Senior Tour playoff record (3–2)

| No. | Year | Tournament | Opponent(s) | Result |
|---|---|---|---|---|
| 1 | 2003 | Senior British Open | (United States) Tom Watson | Lost to par on second extra hole |
| 2 | 2004 | De Vere PGA Seniors Championship | (Japan) Seiji Ebihara, (England) Jim Rhodes | Won with birdie on second extra hole Rhodes eliminated by par on first hole |
| 3 | 2007 | Sharp Italian Seniors Open | (England) Tony Allen, (United States) John Benda, (New Zealand) Simon Owen | Owen won with birdie on first extra hole |
| 4 | 2007 | European Senior Masters | (Italy) Costantino Rocca | Won with birdie on first extra hole |
| 5 | 2009 | Benahavis Senior Masters | (Scotland) Gordon Brand Jnr | Won with birdie on second extra hole |

== Playoff record ==
Champions Tour playoff record (0–1)

| No. | Year | Tournament | Opponent | Result |
|---|---|---|---|---|
| 1 | 2003 | Senior British Open | (United States) Tom Watson | Lost to par on second extra hole |

== Results in major championships ==
| Tournament | 1974 | 1975 | 1976 | 1977 | 1978 | 1979 |
|---|---|---|---|---|---|---|
| The Open Championship | CUT | 62 | | | T24 | T50 |

| Tournament | 1980 | 1981 | 1982 | 1983 | 1984 | 1985 | 1986 | 1987 | 1988 | 1989 |
|---|---|---|---|---|---|---|---|---|---|---|
| The Open Championship | T4 | CUT | CUT | CUT | | CUT | T56 | T44 | T57 | |

| Tournament | 1990 | 1991 | 1992 | 1993 | 1994 | 1995 | 1996 | 1997 |
|---|---|---|---|---|---|---|---|---|
| The Open Championship | | | | T39 | T67 | CUT | T22 | CUT |

Note: Mason only played in The Open Championship.

Top 10
Did not play

CUT = missed the half-way cut
"T" indicates a tie for a place

== Team appearances ==
Professional

- World Cup (representing England): 1980
- Hennessy Cognac Cup (representing Great Britain and Ireland): 1980 (winners)
- UBS Cup (representing the Rest of the World): 2003 (tie), 2004

== See also ==
- List of golfers with most European Senior Tour wins
