= Jolie Ville Sharm El Sheikh Seniors Open =

Tournament information
- Location: Sharm El Sheikh, Egypt
- Established: 2005
- Course: Jolie Ville Golf Resort
- Par: 72
- Length: 6,582 yards (6,019 m)
- Tour: European Seniors Tour
- Format: Stroke play
- Prize fund: US$255,000
- Month played: April
- Final year: 2005

Final champion
- (United States) Bob Lendzion
- Location in Egypt

The Jolie Ville Sharm El Sheikh Seniors Open was a men's senior (over 50) professional golf tournament on the European Seniors Tour, held at the Jolie Ville Golf, Sharm El Sheikh, Egypt. It was held just once, in April 2005, and was won by Bob Lendzion who finished a stroke ahead of John Mashego and David J. Russell. The total prize fund was US$255,000.

== Winners ==
Year	Winner	Score	To par	Margin of victory	Runners-up
2005	(United States) Bob Lendzion	198	−18	1 stroke	(South Africa) John Mashego (England) David J. Russell
