= Sam Torrance =

Scottish professional golfer (born 1953)

Sam Torrance OBE
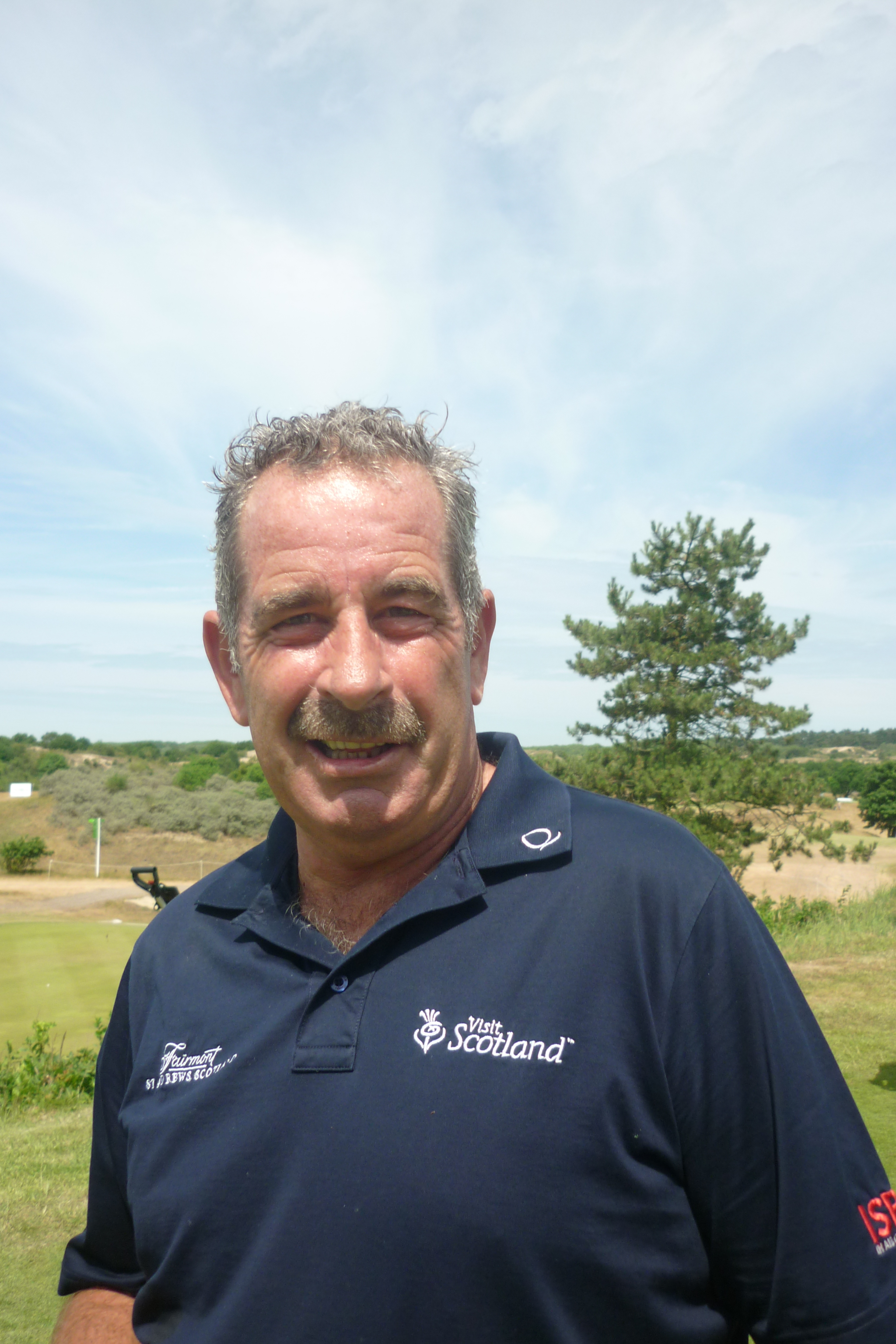
- At the Dutch Seniors Open 2010

Personal information
- Full name: Samuel Robert Torrance OBE
- Nationality: Scotland
- Born: 24 August 1953 (age 73) Largs, Scotland
- Height: 5 ft 11 in (1.80 m)
- Spouse: Suzanne Danielle (m. 1995)
- Children: 4

Career
- Sport: Golf
- Turned professional: 1970
- Former tours: European Tour; European Senior Tour; Champions Tour
- Professional wins: 46
- Highest ranking: 13 (3 December 1995)

Number of wins by tour
- European Tour: 21 (Tied-10th all-time)
- PGA Tour of Australasia: 1
- European Senior Tour: 11 (3rd all-time)
- Other: 13

Best results in major championships
- Masters Tournament: T31: 1985
- PGA Championship: T23: 1995
- U.S. Open: T16: 1996
- The Open Championship: 5th: 1981

Achievements and awards
- Sir Henry Cotton Rookie of the Year: 1972
- European Senior Tour Order of Merit winner: 2005, 2006, 2009

Samuel Robert Torrance (born 24 August 1953) is a Scottish former professional golfer and sports commentator. He was one of the leading players on the European Tour from the mid-1970s to the late 1990s, with 21 Tour wins. Torrance was a member of European Ryder Cup teams on eight occasions consecutively; on Cup-winning teams four times. He was also part of the winning Scotland team at the 1995 Dunhill Cup. He was the winning non-playing captain of the European Ryder Cup team in 2002. Torrance was honoured with the MBE (1996) and OBE (2003), for his outstanding contributions to golf.

== Early life ==
Torrance was born and grew up in Largs on the west coast of Scotland, playing golf at Routenburn Golf Club, near his family home. His father Bob (1932–2014) was a highly respected golf instructor who coached son Sam from childhood.

Torrance represented Scotland against England at a Boys International Match at Hillside Golf Club, Southport, in August 1970.

He turned professional at the age of 17, and his first job was at Sunningdale Golf Club, where he used to play for money with members, which was much needed because he was paid only £5 a week as an assistant professional.

== Professional career ==
=== European Tour ===
In 1970, Torrance joined the tour, which officially became the European Tour in 1972. He achieved his first professional win in 1972, and won the Sir Henry Cotton Rookie of the Year award in the same year. He recorded his first European Tour win in 1976.

He won 21 times on the European Tour; only fellow Scot Colin Montgomerie has accumulated more European Tour titles without winning one of golf's four major championships. Torrance's best finish on the European Tour Order of Merit was second, which he achieved in 1984 and 1995. In total, he finished in the top-10 on the list 10 times. He previously held the record for the most career appearances on the European Tour, with 706. At the 2020 Hero Open, Miguel Ángel Jiménez passed Torrance for most starts on the European Tour.

Torrance played in The Open Championship 28 times, with a best finish of tied 5th in 1981 at Royal St George's Golf Club in Sandwich, England.

On his first visit on the PGA Tour of Australasia, at the time named the PGA Tour of Australia, Torrance finished second to George Serhan at the 1980 New South Wales Open in beginning of November and the week after he won the Australian PGA Championship at Royal Melbourne Golf Club, beating Seve Ballesteros by two strokes. The year after, Torrance came back to Australia, capping a second-place finish in October, after losing in a playoff to Eamonn Darcy at the 1981 CBA West Lakes Classic.

On a rare visit on the U.S.-based PGA Tour, in October 1983, in preparation for the Ryder Cup match to be played in Florida later the same month, Torrance finished tied first after 72 holes at the 1983 Southern Open at the Green Island Country Club in Columbus, Georgia. This was the first time he ever made the cut on a PGA Tour tournament. He eventually lost in a playoff against Ronnie Black on the fourth extra hole.

The year after, he was again close to victory on another continent. He lost in a playoff on the Japan Golf Tour to home player Masahiro Kuramoto at the 1984 Bridgestone Tournament at Sodegaura Country Club, Chiba, Japan. That year he also finished in second place at the Malaysian Open, tying Australia's Terry Gale for second, two behind Taiwan's Lu Chien-soon. Torrance reached another second place in Japan at the 1987 Casio World Open, losing by two strokes to American David Ishii, after leading or tying the lead after each of the first three rounds.

Torrance played for Europe in the Ryder Cup eight times, from 1981 to 1995 consecutively; the Cup is contested every two years. In 1985 he sank the winning putt on the 18th green at The Belfry, England, which deprived the Americans of the trophy for the first time in 28 years. He also was a member of Cup-winning teams in 1987 (first-ever win for Europe on American soil), 1989 and 1995. In 2002, he was the non-playing captain on the European team which won the 2002 Cup at The Belfry. This made him the second European to sink the winning putt and captain a winning team at separate Ryder Cups, after Seve Ballesteros in 1987 (as a player) and 1997 (as captain). Torrance was also named a vice-captain for the 2016 Ryder Cup at Hazeltine by captain Darren Clarke.

Torrance represented Scotland eleven times at the World Cup and nine times at the Alfred Dunhill Cup.

Team Scotland twice finished second in the World Cup with Torrance on the two-man-team, 1984 with Gordon Brand Jnr and 1987 with Sandy Lyle. Individually, Torrance finished tied 5th at the 1978 World Cup in Hanalei, Hawaii and 3rd at the 1995 World Cup of Golf at the Mission Hills Golf Club in Shenzhen, China.

He was part of the winning Scotland team, with Colin Montgomerie and Andrew Coltart, at the 1995 Dunhill Cup at the Old Course at St Andrews in Scotland. The home team defeated Zimbabwe in the final 2–1, where Torrance won over Mark McNulty.

=== Senior career ===
In 2003, upon turning 50, Torrance became eligible to play in senior tournaments, and he picked up his first win on the European Senior Tour in 2004. He finished first on the European Senior Tour's Order of Merit in 2005, 2006 and 2009, but never won a senior major. His best finish was lone 5th in the Senior Open Championship, achieved in 2009, which was the same result as his best finish in The Open and a regular major.

During this era, Torrance has worked as a commentator for BBC Sport golf coverage. Along with Kelly Tilghman, he also provided commentary for Tiger Woods PGA Tour 09.

Torrance retired from competitive golf after playing his last event on the European Senior Tour, at the time named the Staysure Tour, in October 2017.

During his prime, Torrance was known for long driving and accurate short iron play.

Torrance was also an early user of the broomhandle putter. After a disappointing 1988 season on the greens, Torrance experimented with the long putter that was already being used successfully in the U.S. He debuted his version, which anchored on the chin rather than the midriff, at the 1989 Jersey Open and subsequently finished in the top five. He has used it relatively successfully ever since.

== Personal life ==
Torrance married English actress Suzanne Danielle in 1995. They have four children.

Torrance's father Bob also coached Sam's son Daniel who played golf to a high level, competing with Sam at the Dunhill Links Championship in the Pro Am competition, winning it once.

Torrance has appeared on the television quiz show A Question of Sport five times since 2005. In October 2006, he took over nine minutes to consider with his teammates Ally McCoist and Michael Holding the question, "Who is the only golfer from Europe or the United States to have won two majors without making a Ryder Cup appearance", eventually correctly answering John Daly.

== Awards and honors ==
- Torrance was appointed a Member of the Order of the British Empire (MBE) in the 1996 Birthday Honours.
- He was promoted to an Officer of the Order of the British Empire (OBE) in the 2003 New Year Honours, for services to golf.
- In the June 2023 Graduation Ceremonies at University of St Andrews, Torrance was awarded Doctor of Laws (LLD), in recognition of his outstanding career in, and contribution to golf.

== Bibliography ==
- Play It Again, Sam: The Autobiography (2001)
- An Enduring Passion: My Ryder Cup Years (2003)
- Sam: The Autobiography of Sam Torrance, Golf's Ryder Cup Winning Hero (2003)
- With Friends Like These: A Selective History of the Ryder Cup (2006)
- Out of Bounds: Legendary Tales From the 19th Hole (2012)

== Professional wins (46) ==
=== European Tour wins (21) ===
No.	Date	Tournament	Winning score	Margin of victory	Runner(s)-up
1	15 May 1976	Piccadilly Medal	−15 (67-72-66-72=277)	2 strokes	(Australia) Bob Shearer
2	12 Jun 1976	Martini International	−8 (69-67-71-73=280)	2 strokes	(England) Tommy Horton
3	16 Aug 1981	Carroll's Irish Open	−12 (68-67-69-72=276)	5 strokes	(England) Nick Faldo
4	3 Oct 1982	Benson & Hedges Spanish Open	−15 (71-65-67-70=273)	8 strokes	(England) Roger Chapman, (Scotland) Sandy Lyle, (Wales) Ian Woosnam
5	7 Nov 1982	Portuguese Open	−9 (71-67-69=207) (Note: Shortened to 54 holes due to weather.)	4 strokes	(England) Nick Faldo
6	3 Jul 1983	Scandinavian Enterprise Open	−8 (73-69-68-70=280)	1 stroke	(United States) Craig Stadler
7	6 Nov 1983	Portuguese Open (2)	−2 (72-73-71-70=286)	3 strokes	(England) Chris Moody
8	15 Apr 1984	Tunisian Open	−6 (66-71-75-70=282)	1 stroke	(England) Brian Waites
9	19 Aug 1984	Benson & Hedges International Open	−18 (63-68-70-69=270)	1 stroke	(Australia) Wayne Grady
10	23 Sep 1984	Sanyo Open	−7 (71-69-70-71=281)	Playoff	(Republic of Ireland) Des Smyth
11	30 Jun 1985	Johnnie Walker Monte Carlo Open	−12 (69-63-62-70=264)	1 stroke	(Japan) Isao Aoki
12	3 May 1987	Lancia Italian Open	−17 (64-68-71-68=271)	Playoff	(Spain) José Rivero
13	7 Oct 1990	Mercedes German Masters	−16 (70-65-64-73=272)	3 strokes	(Germany) Bernhard Langer, (Wales) Ian Woosnam
14	14 Apr 1991	Jersey European Airways Open	−9 (68-69-69-73=279)	1 stroke	(England) Mark Davis
15	28 Mar 1993	Kronenbourg Open	−4 (69-68-73-74=284)	1 stroke	(Scotland) Mike Miller
16	25 Apr 1993	Heineken Open	−15 (71-63-67=201)	2 strokes	(United States) Jay Townsend
17	13 Jun 1993	Honda Open	−10 (68-69-68-73=278)	Playoff	(England) Paul Broadhurst, (Sweden) Johan Ryström, (Wales) Ian Woosnam
18	7 May 1995	Italian Open (2)	−19 (69-70-63-67=269)	2 strokes	(Spain) José Rivero
19	9 Jul 1995	Murphy's Irish Open (2)	−11 (68-68-70-71=277)	Playoff	(England) Stuart Cage, (England) Howard Clark
20	17 Sep 1995	Collingtree British Masters	−18 (67-66-68-69=270)	1 stroke	(New Zealand) Michael Campbell
21	28 Jun 1998	Peugeot Open de France	−12 (64-70-72-70=276)	2 strokes	(France) Olivier Edmond, (Italy) Massimo Florioli, (Australia) Mathew Goggin, (Germany) Bernhard Langer

European Tour playoff record (4–2)

No.	Year	Tournament	Opponent(s)	Result
1	1984	Sanyo Open	(Republic of Ireland) Des Smyth	Won with par on first extra hole
2	1987	Lancia Italian Open	(Spain) José Rivero	Won with par on sixth extra hole
3	1987	London Standard Four Stars National Pro-Celebrity	(Zimbabwe) Mark McNulty	Lost to birdie on second extra hole
4	1990	NM English Open	(England) Mark James	Lost to birdie on first extra hole
5	1993	Honda Open	(England) Paul Broadhurst, (Sweden) Johan Ryström, (Wales) Ian Woosnam	Won with birdie on first extra hole
6	1995	Murphy's Irish Open	(England) Stuart Cage, (England) Howard Clark	Won with eagle on second extra hole Cage eliminated by par on first hole

=== PGA Tour of Australasia wins (1) ===
No.	Date	Tournament	Winning score	Margin of victory	Runner-up
1	9 Nov 1980	Mayne Nickless Australian PGA Championship	−6 (71-72-69-70=282)	2 strokes	(Spain) Seve Ballesteros

PGA Tour of Australasia playoff record (0–1)

No.	Year	Tournament	Opponent	Result
1	1981	CBA West Lakes Classic	(Republic of Ireland) Eamonn Darcy	Lost to birdie on first extra hole

=== Safari Circuit wins (1) ===
No.	Date	Tournament	Winning score	Margin of victory	Runner-up
1	23 Mar 1975	Zambia Open	−12 (66-69-70-75=280)	Playoff	(Scotland) Brian Barnes

=== South American Golf Circuit wins (1) ===
No.	Date	Tournament	Winning score	Margin of victory	Runner-up
1	16 Dec 1979	Colombian Open	−11 (67-64-70-72=273)	3 strokes	(United States) Ray Carrasco

=== Other wins (11) ===
- 1972 Lord Derby's Under-25 Match Play Championship, Radici Open (Italy)
- 1975 Scottish Uniroyal Tournament
- 1978 Scottish Professional Championship
- 1979 Skol Tournament
- 1980 Scottish Professional Championship
- 1982 Skol Tournament
- 1985 Scottish Professional Championship
- 1991 Scottish Professional Championship
- 1993 Scottish Professional Championship
- 2006 Hassan II Golf Trophy

=== European Senior Tour wins (11) ===
Legend
Tour Championships (1)
Other European Senior Tour (10)

No.	Date	Tournament	Winning score	Margin of victory	Runner(s)-up
1	15 Aug 2004	Travis Perkins Senior Masters	−13 (72-69-62=203)	2 strokes	(Japan) Seiji Ebihara
2	12 Jun 2005	Irvine Whitlock Seniors Classic	−11 (65-68-72=205)	4 strokes	(England) David J. Russell
3	7 Aug 2005	De Vere PGA Seniors Championship	−17 (66-70-66-69=271)	4 strokes	(England) David J. Russell
4	25 Sep 2005	Bendinat London Seniors Masters	−15 (64-67-70=201)	3 strokes	(England) David J. Russell
5	21 May 2006	Sharp Italian Seniors Open	−11 (68-70-67=205)	4 strokes	(Republic of Ireland) Eamonn Darcy
6	4 Jun 2006	AIB Irish Seniors Open	−6 (70-68-69=207)	Playoff	(United States) Jerry Bruner, (Chile) Guillermo Encina, (Australia) Stewart Ginn
7	28 Aug 2006	PGA Seniors Championship (2)	−20 (65-66-71-66=268)	3 strokes	(Argentina) Luis Carbonetti
8	3 Sep 2006	Charles Church Scottish Seniors Open	−3 (76-67-70=213)	1 stroke	(Scotland) Bill Longmuir
9	24 Jun 2007	Bendinat London Seniors Masters (2)	−10 (68-68-70=206)	1 stroke	(Spain) José Rivero
10	9 Nov 2008	OKI Castellón Open España Senior Tour Championship	−13 (68-66-69=203)	2 strokes	(Chile) Ángel Fernández, (Japan) Katsuyoshi Tomori
11	20 Mar 2009	DGM Barbados Open	−14 (65-63-74=202)	4 strokes	(Paraguay) Ángel Franco

European Senior Tour playoff record (1–1)

No.	Year	Tournament	Opponent(s)	Result
1	2005	Bovis Lend Lease European Senior Masters	(England) Mark James	Lost to birdie on first extra hole
2	2006	AIB Irish Seniors Open	(United States) Jerry Bruner, (Chile) Guillermo Encina, (Australia) Stewart Ginn	Won with eagle on second extra hole Encina and Ginn eliminated by birdie on first hole

== Playoff record ==
PGA Tour playoff record (0–1)

No.	Year	Tournament	Opponent	Result
1	1983	Southern Open	(United States) Ronnie Black	Lost to birdie on fourth extra hole

PGA of Japan Tour playoff record (0–1)

No.	Year	Tournament	Opponents	Result
1	1984	Bridgestone Tournament	(Taiwan) Chen Tze-chung, (Japan) Yoshihisa Iwashita, (Japan) Masahiro Kuramoto	Kuramoto won with eagle on first extra hole

== Results in major championships ==
Tournament	1972	1973	1974	1975	1976	1977	1978	1979
Masters Tournament								
U.S. Open								
The Open Championship	T46	CUT	CUT	T19	CUT	CUT	CUT	CUT
PGA Championship								

Tournament	1980	1981	1982	1983	1984	1985	1986	1987	1988	1989
Masters Tournament						T31				
U.S. Open										
The Open Championship	T38	5	12	T53	T9	T16	T21	T50	T47	CUT
PGA Championship										

Tournament	1990	1991	1992	1993	1994	1995	1996	1997	1998	1999	2000
Masters Tournament					T33		CUT	T39			
U.S. Open					T21		T16			CUT	
The Open Championship	T39	T44	CUT	T51	CUT	T11	CUT	CUT	T24		CUT
PGA Championship		CUT			T30	T23	CUT	T45			CUT

Top 10
Did not play

CUT = missed the half-way cut (3rd round cut in 1973, 1977 and 1978 Open Championships)
"T" indicates a tie for a place

=== Summary ===
Tournament	Wins	2nd	3rd	Top-5	Top-10	Top-25	Events	Cuts made
Masters Tournament	0	0	0	0	0	0	4	3
U.S. Open	0	0	0	0	0	2	3	2
The Open Championship	0	0	0	1	2	8	28	16
PGA Championship	0	0	0	0	0	1	6	3
Totals	0	0	0	1	2	11	41	24

- Most consecutive cuts made – 10 (1980 Open Championship – 1988 Open Championship)
- Longest streak of top-10s – 1 (twice)

== Results in senior major championships ==
Results are not in chronological order before 2016.

Tournament	2004	2005	2006	2007	2008	2009	2010	2011	2012	2013	2014	2015	2016
The Tradition				T21									
Senior PGA Championship	T38		T19	CUT	T34	T53	T56	CUT					
The Senior Open Championship	T9	T29	CUT	T10	CUT	5	T63	CUT	CUT	CUT		T75	CUT
U.S. Senior Open				T5	CUT								

Top 10
Did not play

CUT = missed the halfway cut
"T" indicates a tie for a place.
Note: Torrance never played in the Senior Players Championship.

== Team appearances ==
- Ryder Cup (representing Europe): 1981, 1983, 1985 (winners), 1987 (winners), 1989 (tied and retained trophy), 1991, 1993, 1995 (winners), 2002 (winners, non-playing captain)
- World Cup (representing Scotland): 1976, 1978, 1982, 1984, 1985, 1987, 1989, 1990, 1991, 1993, 1995
- Double Diamond International (representing Scotland): 1973 (winners), 1976, 1977
- Hennessy Cognac Cup (representing Great Britain and Ireland): 1976 (winners), 1978 (winners), 1980 (winners), 1982 (winners), (representing Scotland) 1984
- Alfred Dunhill Cup (representing Scotland): 1985, 1986, 1987, 1989, 1990, 1991, 1993, 1995 (winners), 1999
- Four Tours World Championship (representing Europe): 1985, 1991 (winners, captain)
- UBS Cup (representing the Rest of the World): 2001, 2002, 2004
- Seve Trophy (representing Great Britain & Ireland): 2013 (non-playing captain)

== See also ==
- List of golfers with most European Tour wins
- List of golfers with most European Senior Tour wins
