= Gordon J. Brand =

English professional golfer (1955–2020)

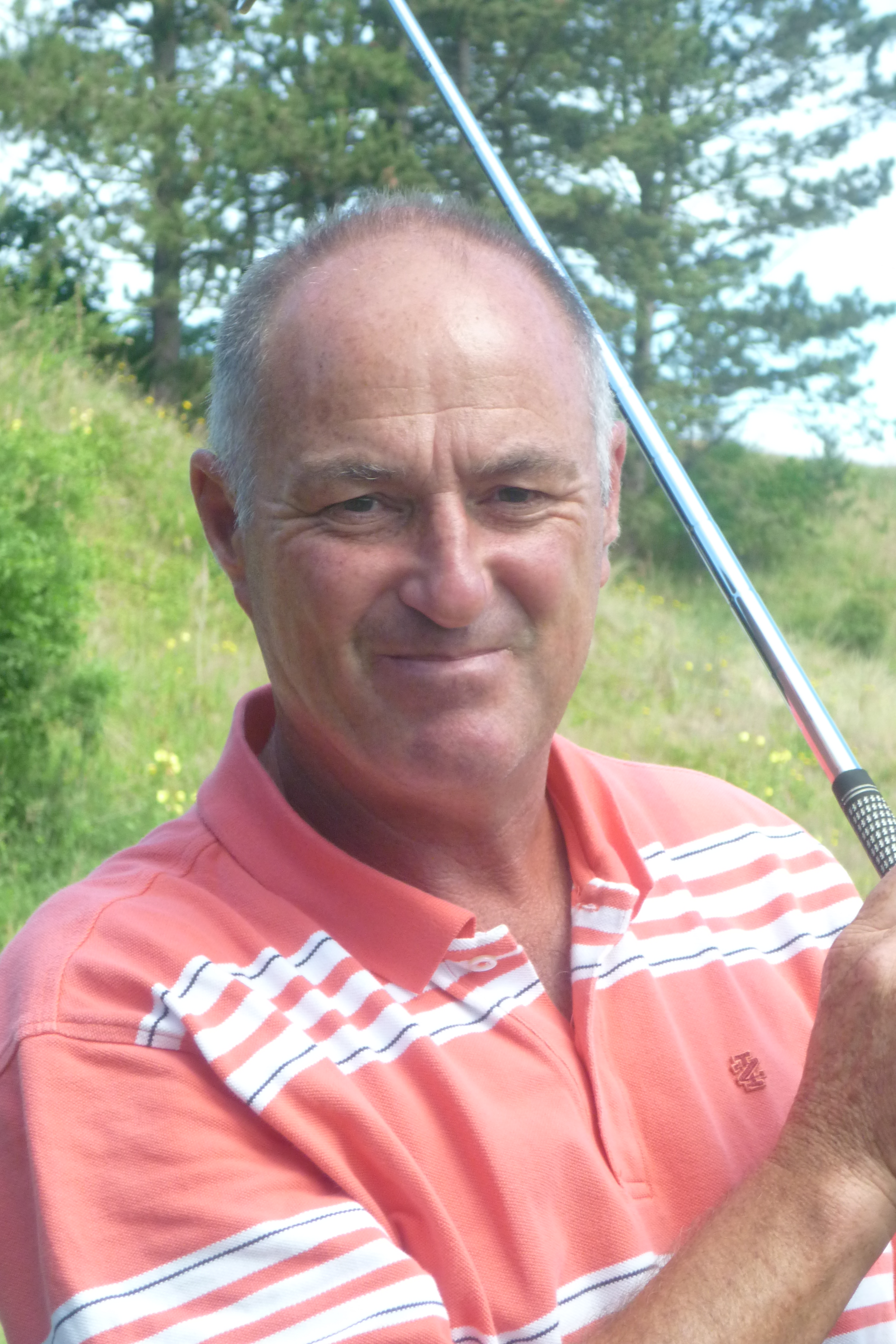

Personal information
- Full name: Gordon John Brand
- Nickname: Brandy
- Nationality: England
- Born: 6 August 1955 Cambridge, England
- Died: 11 August 2020 (aged 65)
- Height: 5 ft 10 in (1.78 m)
- Spouse: Lyn Ghent (m. 1979)
- Children: 2

Career
- Sport: Golf
- Turned professional: 1976
- Former tours: European Tour; European Senior Tour
- Professional wins: 14

Number of wins by tour
- European Tour: 1
- European Senior Tour: 5
- Other: 8

Best results in major championships
- Masters Tournament: DNP
- PGA Championship: DNP
- U.S. Open: CUT: 1989
- The Open Championship: 2nd: 1986

Gordon John Brand (6 August 1955 – 11 August 2020) was an English professional golfer.

== Career ==
Brand turned professional in 1976 and enjoyed full playing privileges on the European Tour for 20 years. During his time on tour, he finished inside the top 30 on the Order of Merit seven times and inside the top 100 16 times. His highest ranking came in 1986, fifth place, in which year he finished as runner-up to Greg Norman in The Open Championship at Turnberry. Brand is also remembered for recording a hole in one at the 16th hole during the 1981 Open Championship at Royal St George's Golf Club. In that year he won the Tooting Bec Cup after posting a round of 65. Brand repeated this feat again in 1986 on his way to finishing runner-up.

Brand won his sole European Tour event in 1989, taking the Belgian Open at Royal Waterloo Golf Club, Brussels, by four shots. He was also very successful in Africa with seven tournament victories on the continent, notably winning the Open de Côte d'Ivoire no fewer than three times. He was a winner of the Safari Circuit order of merit on three occasions.

Brand played in the 1983 Ryder Cup, represented England at the World Cup and was part of the 1986 and winning 1987 Dunhill Cup teams. Brand's win against Sam Torrance helped, alongside Nick Faldo and Howard Clark beat Scotland on the final day to secure the title.

After a successful golfing career, Brand went on to work for the European Tour as a tournament referee before quitting in 2005 to play on the European Senior Tour. Brand had five victories on the European Senior Tour to his name, the most memorable coming at the 2008 PGA Seniors Championship. After a 72-hole score of 4-over par, Brand and Gordon Brand Jnr of Scotland (no relation) played a record-equalling six hole playoff, with Brand (the Englishman) winning the sixth extra hole with a par putt on the par 3 17th after playing the 18th hole five times.

After his win, Brand credited his wife Lyn, a former Ladies European Tour player for a putting tip suggested to him before the final round. A week later, Brand also won the Travis Perkins Senior Masters at Woburn Golf Club. With that win, Brand finished a senior career-best second on the Order of Merit behind former Masters champion Ian Woosnam. After finishing second on the Order of Merit in 2008, Brand struggled for form finishing 21st and 15th in the 2009 and 2010 Order of Merits respectively, posting only five top 10 finishes.

== Death ==
Brand died on 11 August 2020 at the age of 65, following a short illness.

== Note ==
Gordon J. Brand should not be confused with his Scottish contemporary Gordon Brand Jnr to whom he was not related.

== Professional wins (14) ==
=== European Tour wins (1) ===
No.	Date	Tournament	Winning score	Margin of victory	Runner-up
1	14 May 1989	Volvo Belgian Open	−11 (67-69-68-69=273)	4 strokes	(England) Kevin Dickens

=== Safari Circuit wins (7) ===
No.	Date	Tournament	Winning score	Margin of victory	Runner(s)-up
1	1 Mar 1981	Ivory Coast Open	−17 (68-74-65-64=271)	Playoff	(England) Martin Poxon
2	27 Feb 1983	Nigerian Open	−9 (71-69-70-65=275)	4 strokes	(England) Gary Cullen
3	16 Feb 1986	Nigerian Open (2)	−12 (70-67-65-70=272)	8 strokes	(England) Malcolm MacKenzie
4	23 Feb 1986	Ivory Coast Open (2)	−15 (71-67-66-69=273)	2 strokes	(Scotland) Brian Marchbank
5	22 Feb 1987	Zimbabwe Open	−11 (74-65-69-69=277)	Playoff	(England) Andrew Murray
6	7 Feb 1988	Ivory Coast Open (3)	−13 (68-71-67-69=275)	2 strokes	(England) Richard Fish
7	21 Jan 1990	Zambia Open	−8 (70-74-68-72=284)	4 strokes	(England) Philip Golding, (Scotland) Craig Maltman

=== Other wins (1) ===
- 1988 Leeds Cup

=== European Seniors Tour wins (5) ===
Legend
Tour Championships (1)
Other European Seniors Tour (4)

No.	Date	Tournament	Winning score	Margin of victory	Runner(s)-up
1	15 Oct 2006	OKI Castellón Open de España Senior	−13 (65-66-72=203)	2 strokes	(England) Carl Mason, (Scotland) Sam Torrance
2	11 Nov 2006	Arcapita Seniors Tour Championship	−5 (73-72-66=211)	Playoff	(Argentina) Adan Sowa
3	2 Mar 2007	DGM Barbados Open	−8 (72-70-66=208)	1 stroke	(United States) Doug Johnson
4	24 Aug 2008	De Vere Collection PGA Seniors Championship	+4 (72-77-68-75=292)	Playoff	(Scotland) Gordon Brand Jnr
5	31 Aug 2008	Travis Perkins plc Senior Masters	−9 (68-69-70=207)	2 strokes	(Spain) Juan Quirós

European Seniors Tour playoff record (2–0)

No.	Year	Tournament	Opponent	Result
1	2006	Arcapita Seniors Tour Championship	(Argentina) Adan Sowa	Won with par on third extra hole
2	2008	De Vere Collection PGA Seniors Championship	(Scotland) Gordon Brand Jnr	Won with par on sixth extra hole

== Results in major championships ==
Tournament	1979	1980	1981	1982	1983	1984	1985	1986	1987	1988	1989
U.S. Open											CUT
The Open Championship	CUT		T19	CUT	CUT	CUT	T25	2	T40	T36	CUT

Top 10
Did not play

CUT = missed the half-way cut (3rd round cut in 1979, 1982, 1983 and 1984 Open Championships)
"T" indicates a tie for a place
Note: Brand never played in the Masters Tournament or the PGA Championship.

== Results in senior major championships ==
Results not in chronological order before 2016.

Tournament	2006	2007	2008	2009	2010	2011	2012	2013	2014	2015	2016
Senior PGA Championship		CUT	T77	CUT		CUT					
Senior British Open Championship	T10	T10	CUT	T26	T50	69	CUT	CUT	CUT	CUT	CUT
U.S. Senior Open				CUT							

Top 10
Did not play

CUT = missed the halfway cut
"T" indicates a tie for a place
Note: Brand never played in The Tradition or the Senior Players Championship.

== Team appearances ==
- Ryder Cup (representing Europe): 1983
- World Cup (representing England): 1983
- Dunhill Cup (representing England): 1986, 1987 (winners)
- Nissan Cup (representing Europe): 1986

== See also ==
- List of golfers with most European Senior Tour wins
