= Denis Durnian =

English professional golfer (1950–2025)

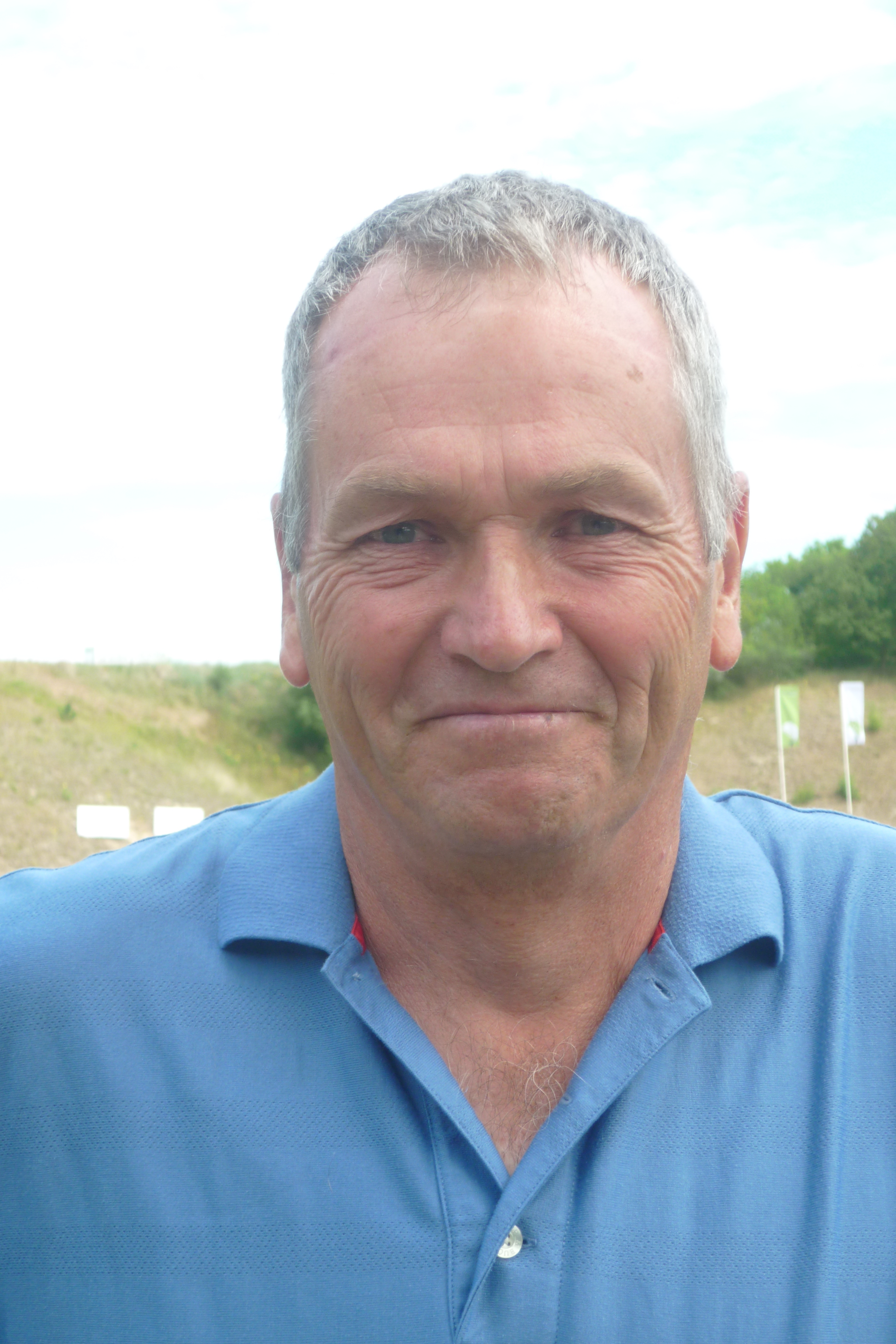

Personal information
- Nationality: England
- Born: 30 June 1950 Wigan, England
- Died: November 2025 (aged 75)
- Height: 6 ft 0 in (1.83 m)
- Weight: 175 lb (79 kg; 12.5 st)
- Children: 3

Career
- Sport: Golf
- Turned professional: 1969
- Former tours: European Tour; European Seniors Tour
- Professional wins: 7
- Highest ranking: 90 (28 May 1989)

Number of wins by tour
- European Senior Tour: 3
- Other: 4

Best results in major championships
- Masters Tournament: DNP
- PGA Championship: DNP
- U.S. Open: DNP
- The Open Championship: T8: 1983

Denis Durnian (30 June 1950 – November 2025) was an English professional golfer.

Durnian was born in Wigan, England, on 30 June 1950. On 1 December 2025, it was confirmed by the European Tour that Durnian had died at the age of 75.

== Professional career ==
In 1969, Durnian turned professional. He played on the European Tour from the early 1970s to the early 1990s. He never won a European Tour event but finished second on four occasions, with one being a defeat in a matchplay final and twice losing out in a playoff. His best finish on the European Tour Order of Merit was 20th in 1988. In 1985, he won the PLM Open on the Swedish Golf Tour. The tournament became a European Tour event the following season. He was twice the British Club Professional Champion.

Durnian played in The Open Championship every year from 1982 to 1990, only making the 36-hole cut on one occasion, in 1983 at Royal Birkdale, when he went on to finish tied for 8th place. During the second round he set the record for the lowest nine-hole total in the Open, with a 28 on the par-34 front nine.. This long-standing record was finally tied 43 years later, with Lucas Herbert shooting 28 on the front nine during his 2nd round at the 2026 Open.

After turning 50, Durnian joined the European Seniors Tour. He won three tournaments at that level and was second on the end of season Order of Merit in both 2001 and 2002.

== Professional wins (7) ==
=== Swedish Golf Tour wins (1) ===
No.	Date	Tournament	Winning score	Margin of victory	Runners-up
1	7 Jul 1985	PLM Open	−14 (69-68-64-73=274)	8 strokes	(Sweden) Per-Arne Brostedt, (Sweden) Ove Sellberg

=== Other wins (3) ===
- 1982 PGA Club Professionals' Championship
- 1984 Wilson Club Professionals' Championship, PGA Fourball Championship (with Derrick Cooper, tied with Philip Posnett & Peter Hanna)

=== European Seniors Tour wins (3) ===
Legend
Tour Championships (1)
Other European Seniors Tour (2)

No.	Date	Tournament	Winning score	Margin of victory	Runner(s)-up
1	10 Jun 2001	Wales Seniors Open	+1 (74-65-69=208)	1 stroke	(United States) Jay Horton
2	22 Sep 2002	Charles Church Scottish Seniors Open	−10 (67-68-71=206)	6 strokes	(England) Neil Coles, (Scotland) Martin Gray, (England) Tommy Horton, (United States) Alan Tapie
3	27 Oct 2002	Estoril Seniors Tour Championship	−5 (68-68-72=208)	Playoff	(Republic of Ireland) Eamonn Darcy

European Seniors Tour playoff record (1–2)

No.	Year	Tournament	Opponent(s)	Result
1	2001	Microlease Jersey Seniors Masters	(Jamaica) Delroy Cambridge, (Japan) Seiji Ebihara	Ebihara won with birdie on third extra hole Cambridge eliminated by par on first hole
2	2002	Estoril Seniors Tour Championship	(Republic of Ireland) Eamonn Darcy	Won after concession on first extra hole
3	2004	Bad Ragaz PGA Seniors Open	(Argentina) Horacio Carbonetti	Lost to par on first extra hole

== Playoff record ==
European Tour playoff record (0–2)

No.	Year	Tournament	Opponent(s)	Result
1	1978	Greater Manchester Open	(Scotland) Brian Barnes, (New Zealand) Bob Charles, (England) Nick Job	Barnes won with birdie on first extra hole
2	1989	Jersey European Airways Open	(Republic of Ireland) Christy O'Connor Jnr	Lost to par on first extra hole

== Results in major championships ==
Tournament	1978	1979	1980	1981	1982	1983	1984	1985	1986	1987	1988	1989	1990
The Open Championship	CUT	CUT			CUT	T8	CUT	CUT	CUT	CUT	CUT	CUT	CUT

Note: Durnian only played in The Open Championship.

Top 10
Did not play

CUT = missed the half-way cut (3rd round cut in 1978 Open Championship)
"T" indicates a tie for a place

== Team appearances ==
- Dunhill Cup (representing England): 1989
- World Cup (representing England): 1989
- PGA Cup (representing Great Britain and Ireland): 1981 (tie), 1982, 1984 (winners), 1986
- UBS Warburg Cup (representing the Rest of the World): 2001, 2002
