= London Seniors Masters =

Tournament information
- Location: Ash, Sevenoaks, Kent, England
- Established: 1995
- Course: London Golf Club
- Par: 72
- Length: 7,035 yards (6,433 m)
- Tour: European Seniors Tour
- Format: Stroke play
- Prize fund: £150,000
- Month played: June
- Final year: 2007

Tournament record score
- Aggregate: 201 Sam Torrance (2005)
- To par: −15 as above

Final champion
- (Scotland) Sam Torrance

Location map
- Location in England Location in Kent

The Bendinat London Seniors Masters was a men's professional golf tournament for players aged 50 and above as part of the European Seniors Tour. It was played in 1995 and then from 2005 to 2007. The event was played at the London Golf Club, Ash, Sevenoaks, Kent. It was played over the Heritage Course, which was designed by Jack Nicklaus. Sam Torrance of Scotland won the 2005 event on his way to topping the European Seniors Tour Order of Merit. In 2007 the prize fund was £150,000.

== Winners ==
Year	Winner	Score	To par	Margin of victory	Runner(s)-up
Bendinat London Seniors Masters
2007	(Scotland) Sam Torrance (2)	206	−10	1 stroke	(Spain) José Rivero
2006	(Italy) Giuseppe Calì	210	−6	Playoff	(Jamaica) Delroy Cambridge
2005	(Scotland) Sam Torrance	201	−15	3 strokes	(England) David J. Russell
London Masters
1996–2004: No tournament
1995	(South Africa) John Bland	210	−6	4 strokes	(England) Tony Grubb (South Africa) Hugh Inggs (England) John Morgan (South Africa) Bobby Verwey
