= UBS Cup =

The UBS Cup was a team golf tournament contested by the United States and a team representing the "Rest of the World" which ran from 2001 to 2004. In 2001 and 2002 it was called the UBS Warburg Cup. Six golfers on each side had to be 50 or over, and the remaining six had to be in their forties. It was sanctioned by the PGA Tour (which operates the Champions Tour for golfers over 50) and the European Seniors Tour. Like the Ryder Cup, the competition was a mixture of foursomes, four-ball and singles.

The United States won the inaugural cup in 2001, held at the Ocean Course at Kiawah Island, by a score of 12 ½ - 11 ½. The U.S. then retained the trophy with a 14 ½ - 9 ½ victory in 2002 on the Seaside Course at Sea Island, Georgia. A 12-12 draw in 2003, again at Sea Island, kept the trophy in the hands of the U.S. defenders. A 14-10 U.S. victory at the Cassique Golf Club on Kiawah Island in 2004 was the final competition, when Colin Montgomerie lost to an American for the first time in matchplay singles.

In 2004 the UBS Cup had a prize fund of $3 million, with $150,000 going to each member of the winning team and $100,000 to each member of the losing team. Arnold Palmer was captain of the United States team in all four UBS Cups, and retained his record of never having lost any team competition as United States captain.

== Results ==
Year	Venue	Winning team (Captain)	Score		Losing team (Captain)
2001	The Ocean Course, Kiawah Island Resort (Kiawah Island, South Carolina)	United States (Arnold Palmer)	12½	11½	Rest of the World (Gary Player)
2002	Sea Island Golf Club (St. Simons Island, Georgia)	United States (Arnold Palmer)	14½	9½	Rest of the World (Gary Player)
2003	Sea Island Golf Club (St. Simons Island, Georgia)	United States (Arnold Palmer); Tie; United States retained Cup	12	12	Rest of the World (Tony Jacklin)
2004	Cassique Golf Club, Kiawah Island Resort (Kiawah Island, South Carolina)	United States (Arnold Palmer)	14	10	Rest of the World (Gary Player)

== Appearances ==
The following are those who played in at least one of the four matches.

=== United States ===
- Paul Azinger 2002
- Mark Calcavecchia 2001
- John Cook 2001
- Fred Couples 2004
- Brad Faxon 2003
- Raymond Floyd 2001, 2002, 2003, 2004
- Fred Funk 2002, 2004
- Bob Gilder 2002
- Jay Haas 2004
- Scott Hoch 2001, 2002, 2003, 2004
- Hale Irwin 2001, 2002, 2003, 2004
- Tom Kite 2002, 2004
- Tom Lehman 2002
- Bruce Lietzke 2003
- Rocco Mediate 2003
- Larry Nelson 2001
- Mark O'Meara 2001, 2002, 2003
- Arnold Palmer 2001, 2002, 2003, 2004
- Dana Quigley 2001
- Loren Roberts 2001
- Craig Stadler 2003, 2004
- Curtis Strange 2001, 2002, 2003, 2004
- Hal Sutton 2003, 2004

=== Rest of the World ===
- (Japan) Isao Aoki 2001, 2002
- (Spain) José María Cañizares 2001
- (Scotland) John Chillas 2004
- (Australia) Rodger Davis 2002, 2003, 2004
- (England) Denis Durnian 2001, 2002
- (Japan) Seiji Ebihara 2002
- (England) Nick Faldo 2001, 2002, 2003
- (Argentina) Vicente Fernández 2003
- (Australia) Stewart Ginn 2001, 2002
- (England) Tony Jacklin 2003
- (England) Barry Lane 2002, 2003, 2004
- (Germany) Bernhard Langer 2001, 2002, 2003, 2004
- (Scotland) Bill Longmuir 2003
- (Scotland) Sandy Lyle 2004
- (England) Carl Mason 2003, 2004
- (Republic of Ireland) Mark McNulty 2004
- (Scotland) Colin Montgomerie 2003, 2004
- (New Zealand) Frank Nobilo 2001
- (South Africa) Gary Player 2001, 2002, 2004
- (Argentina) Eduardo Romero 2002, 2003
- (Australia) Peter Senior 2004
- (Republic of Ireland) Des Smyth 2001, 2003
- (Australia) Ian Stanley 2001
- (Scotland) Sam Torrance 2001, 2002, 2004
- (Wales) Ian Woosnam 2001, 2002, 2003, 2004
