= Delroy Cambridge =

Jamaican professional golfer (born 1949)

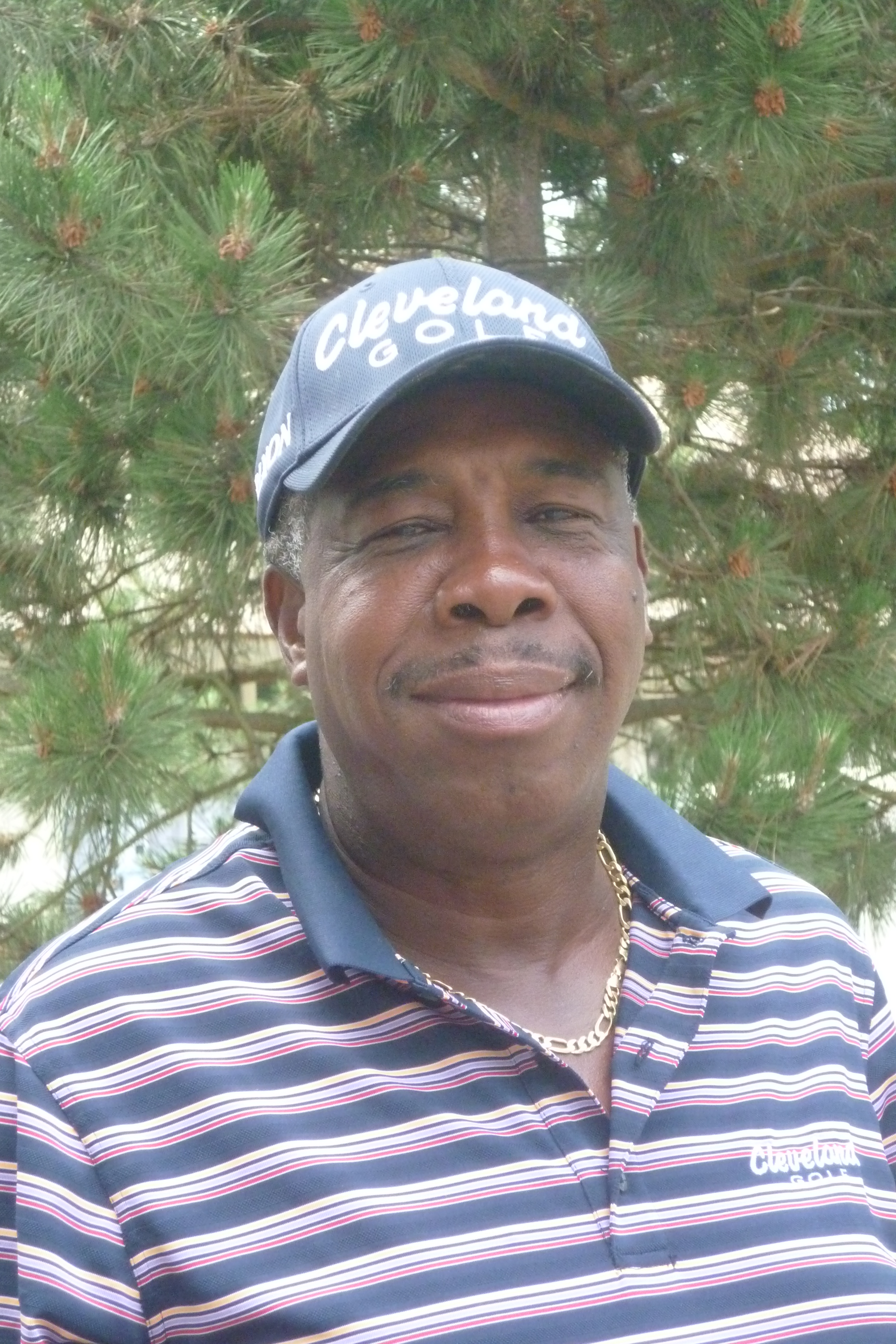

Personal information
- Nationality: Jamaica
- Born: 12 November 1949 (age 76) Mandeville, Jamaica
- Height: 1.88 m (6 ft 2 in)
- Weight: 90 kg (198 lb; 14 st 2 lb)

Career
- Sport: Golf
- Turned professional: 1971
- Former tour: European Senior Tour
- Professional wins: 7

Number of wins by tour
- European Senior Tour: 5
- Other: 2

Delroy Cambridge (born 12 November 1949) is a Jamaican professional golfer.

== Professional career ==
In 1971, Cambridge turned professional. He has spent many years in the United States, where he worked as an assistant professional at Sunningdale Country Club in Scarsdale, New York and played in local and regional events in the New York region.

He is more notable for his achievements in senior (over 50) golf. In 2000, he became the first Jamaican to qualify to play on the European Seniors Tour and he made the top-25 on that tour's Order of Merit every year from 2001 to 2006, with a best ranking of third in 2002. He has won five European Senior Tour tournaments.

In November 2010, he nearly won a senior event in Australia. He held the lead entering the final round of the Fiducian Legends Australian PGA Championship. He led by three shots entering the 16th hole of the final round. However he finished triple bogey-par-bogey to finish runner-up to Australian golfer Lyndsay Stephen.

== Professional wins (7) ==
=== Regular career wins (2) ===
This list is probably incomplete

- 1994 Westchester Open
- 1998 Jamaica Open

=== European Senior Tour wins (5) ===
| No. | Date | Tournament | Winning score | Margin of victory | Runner(s)-up |
|---|---|---|---|---|---|
| 1 | 7 Oct 2001 | Dan Technology Senior Tournament of Champions | −8 (69-67-69=205) | 1 stroke | (United States) Jerry Bruner |
| 2 | 16 Jun 2002 | Microlease Jersey Seniors Masters | −11 (70-68-67=205) | 2 strokes | (England) Tommy Horton, (England) Ian Mosey |
| 3 | 15 Sep 2002 | Bovis Lend Lease European Senior Masters | −9 (69-70-68=207) | 2 strokes | (Republic of Ireland) Eamonn Darcy, (Japan) Seiji Ebihara |
| 4 | 12 Oct 2002 | The Daily Telegraph Sodexho; Seniors Match Play Championship | 1 up | | (Northern Ireland) Eddie Polland |
| 5 | 14 Jun 2009 | Jersey Seniors Classic (2) | −9 (69-70-68=207) | Playoff | (Australia) Mike Clayton |

European Senior Tour playoff record (1–2)

| No. | Year | Tournament | Opponent(s) | Result |
|---|---|---|---|---|
| 1 | 2001 | Microlease Jersey Seniors Masters | (England) Denis Durnian, (Japan) Seiji Ebihara | Ebihara won with birdie on third extra hole Cambridge eliminated by par on first hole |
| 2 | 2006 | Bendinat London Seniors Masters | (Italy) Giuseppe Calì | Lost to birdie on fifth extra hole |
| 3 | 2009 | Jersey Seniors Classic | (Australia) Mike Clayton | Won with par on third extra hole |

== Team appearances ==
- World Cup (representing Jamaica): 1996, 1998, 2006

== See also ==
- List of golfers with most European Senior Tour wins
