= 2006 European Seniors Tour =

Golf tour season

2006 European Seniors Tour season
- Duration: 1 March 2006 – 11 November 2006
- Number of official events: 19
- Most wins: (Scotland) Sam Torrance (4)
- Order of Merit: (Scotland) Sam Torrance
- Rookie of the Year: (Spain) José Rivero

The 2006 European Seniors Tour was the 15th season of the European Seniors Tour, the main professional golf tour in Europe for men aged 50 and over.

== Schedule ==
The following table lists official events during the 2006 season.

Date	Tournament	Host country	Purse (€)	Winner (Note: The number in brackets after each winner's name is the number of European Seniors Tour events they had won up to and including that tournament. This information is only shown for European Seniors Tour members.)	Notes
3 Mar	DGM Barbados Open	Barbados	US$225,000	(Spain) José Rivero (1)	
21 May	Sharp Italian Seniors Open	Italy	175,000	(Scotland) Sam Torrance (5)	
28 May	Senior PGA Championship	United States	US$2,000,000	(United States) Jay Haas (n/a)	Senior major championship (Note: Official win; unofficial money.)
4 Jun	AIB Irish Seniors Open	Ireland	420,000	(Scotland) Sam Torrance (6)	
11 Jun	Irvine Whitlock Seniors Classic	Jersey	£120,000	(Chile) Guillermo Encina (1)	
18 Jun	Firstplus Wales Seniors Open	Wales	£500,000	(Spain) José Rivero (2)	
1 Jul	Bendinat London Seniors Masters	England	£150,000	(Italy) Giuseppe Calì (2)	
9 Jul	U.S. Senior Open	United States	US$2,600,000	(United States) Allen Doyle (n/a)	Senior major championship
30 Jul	The Senior British Open Championship	Scotland	US$1,800,000	(United States) Loren Roberts (n/a)	Senior major championship
6 Aug	Wentworth Senior Masters	England	£250,000	(Argentina) Eduardo Romero (2)	
13 Aug	Bad Ragaz PGA Seniors Open	Switzerland	210,000	(Spain) Juan Quirós (1)	
19 Aug	Scandinavian Senior Open	Denmark	250,000	(Japan) Katsuyoshi Tomori (1)	
28 Aug	PGA Seniors Championship	England	£200,000	(Scotland) Sam Torrance (7)	
3 Sep	Charles Church Scottish Seniors Open	Scotland	£200,000	(Scotland) Sam Torrance (8)	
10 Sep	European Senior Masters	England	£225,000	(England) Carl Mason (12)	
17 Sep	Midas Group English Seniors Open	England	£150,000	(England) Carl Mason (13)	
15 Oct	OKI Castellón Open de España Senior	Spain	300,000	(England) Gordon J. Brand (1)	
22 Oct	Estoril Seniors Open of Portugal	Portugal	300,000	(England) Carl Mason (14)	
11 Nov	Arcapita Seniors Tour Championship	Bahrain	US$500,000	(England) Gordon J. Brand (2)	Tour Championship

== Order of Merit ==
The Order of Merit was based on prize money won during the season, calculated in Euros.

Position	Player	Prize money (€)
1	(Scotland) Sam Torrance	347,525
2	(England) Carl Mason	268,453
3	(Spain) José Rivero	233,374
4	(England) Gordon J. Brand	196,002
5	(Australia) Stewart Ginn	178,260

== Awards ==
Award	Winner	Ref.
Rookie of the Year	(Spain) José Rivero	
