= Bill Longmuir =

Scottish professional golfer

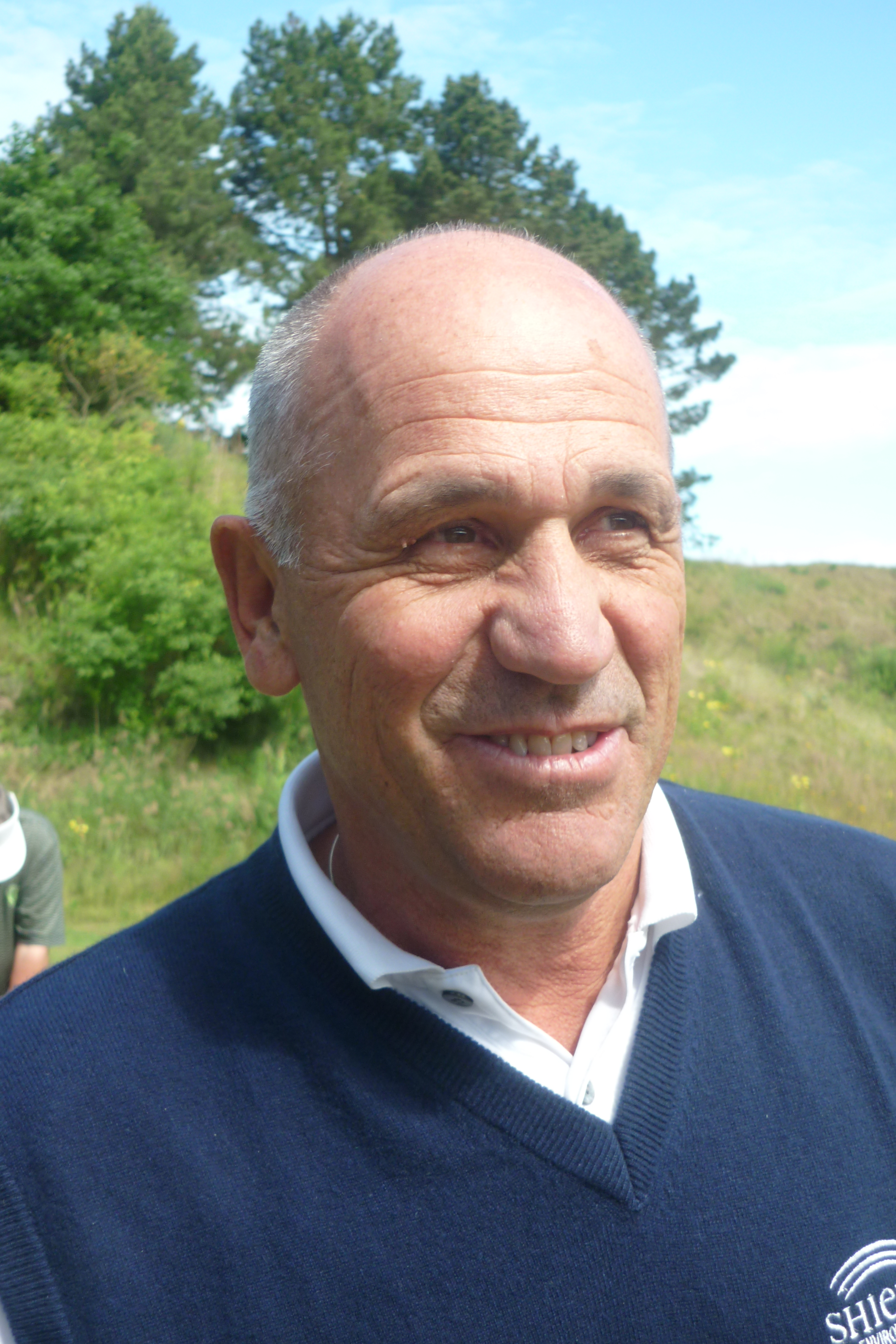

Personal information
- Full name: William George Longmuir
- Nationality: Scotland
- Born: 10 June 1953 (age 73) Thundersley, Essex, England
- Height: 1.78 m (5 ft 10 in)
- Weight: 81 kg (179 lb; 12.8 st)
- Children: 4

Career
- Sport: Golf
- Turned professional: 1968
- Former tours: European Tour; Champions Tour; European Senior Tour
- Professional wins: 14

Number of wins by tour
- European Senior Tour: 8 (Tied-8th all-time)
- Other: 6

Best results in major championships
- Masters Tournament: DNP
- PGA Championship: DNP
- U.S. Open: DNP
- The Open Championship: T30: 1979

William George Longmuir (born 10 June 1953) is a Scottish professional golfer.

== Early life ==
Longmuir was born in Thundersley, Essex, England to Scottish parents. Despite having lived in England all his life, he regards himself as Scottish and is classified as such for international competition.

== Professional career ==
In 1968, he turned professional. He played full-time on the European Tour from 1979 to 1993. He never won on tour but finished runner-up three times. He made the top 100 on the Order of Merit every year from 1976 to 1990.

Although Longmuir started playing some events on the European Tour in 1976, he originally found more success on its offshoot tour, the Safari Circuit, in Africa. Longmuir won the 1976 Nigerian Open for his first professional victory. He achieved this despite political violence emanating from the fringe of the course. He would win three more times on the Safari Circuit.

Longmuir may be best known to international audiences for his performance in the 1979 Open Championship at Royal Lytham & St Annes Golf Club. He shot an opening round 65 (−6) to take a three-stroke lead over defending U.S. Open champion Hale Irwin. He shot a second round 74 but, in the difficult conditions, was still in solo third place only one behind Seve Ballesteros and three behind Irwin. A third round 77 drew him back but he was still in the top 10, 5 behind, with an outside chance. He then exploded with an 82 during the final round, the second worst round of the day, to finish at 298 (+14) in a tie for 30th. Although the tournament did not end well, he won the Tooting Bec Cup. The award goes to the British golfer who shot the lowest single round in the Open Championship.

Longmuir best year on the European Tour was in 1982. He finished tied in regulation at the German Open and Swiss Open. However, he would lose both events in playoffs to Bernhard Langer and Ian Woosnam, respectively. He would record a career-best 24th on the European Tour Order of Merit.

Longmuir kept his card for the remainder of the '80s but could not repeat this success. After his playoff loss to Woosnam he would only record one more top ten over the next five years. Like his 1979 early round success, his top achievement during this era may be sticking close to the lead at the early rounds of the Open Championship. At the 1984 Open Championship at St Andrews he shot 67 (-5) to hold the lead with Peter Jacobsen and Greg Norman. He shot one under the next day to stay in the top 5. Like 1979, he fell back mightily over the last two days and finished T55. He would win the Tooting Bec Cup again, however.

1990 was Longmuir's final good season on the European Tour. He recorded 3 top tens including his third and final runner-up finish. It was his final year inside the Top 100 on the Order of Merit.

Longmuir joined the European Senior Tour in 2003 and has had great success. In his rookie season he won two events and finished runner-up on the Order of Merit. By 2012 he finished in the top 30 of the Order of Merit every year and won eight events. In 2006 he played on the United States-based Champions Tour after coming through its Qualifying School. His son, Callum, often caddies for him on the European Senior Tour.

== Personal life ==
Longmuir now lives in Thundersley, England. He has four children.

== Professional wins (14) ==
=== New Zealand Golf Circuit wins (1) ===
No.	Date	Tournament	Winning score	Margin of victory	Runner-up
1	14 Nov 1976	Southland Charity Golf Classic	−8 (69-68-70-73=280)	3 strokes	(United States) Pat McLeary

=== Safari Circuit wins (4) ===
- 1976 Nigerian Open
- 1980 Nigerian Open
- 1983 Ivory Coast Open
- 1985 Nigerian Open

=== Other wins (1) ===
- 1996 Glenmuir Club Professional Championship

=== European Senior Tour wins (8) ===
No.	Date	Tournament	Winning score	Margin of victory	Runner(s)-up
1	6 Jul 2003	Ryder Cup Wales Seniors Open	−8 (68-66-65=199)	3 strokes	(United States) David Oakley
2	23 Aug 2003	De Vere PGA Seniors Championship	−17 (68-67-69-67=271)	2 strokes	(England) Carl Mason, (Republic of Ireland) Denis O'Sullivan
3	20 Jun 2004	Mobile Cup	−9 (72-68-67=207)	1 stroke	(Japan) Seiji Ebihara
4	29 Aug 2004	Charles Church Scottish Seniors Open	−6 (69-73-68=210)	1 stroke	(Scotland) John Chillas, (England) Carl Mason
5	11 Sep 2005	Scandinavian Senior Open	−17 (66-66-64=196)	4 strokes	(Italy) Giuseppe Calì
6	19 Aug 2007	Midas English Seniors Open	−8 (70-69-69=208)	2 strokes	(England) Carl Mason
7	9 Mar 2008	DGM Barbados Open	−10 (74-67-65=206)	3 strokes	(England) Bob Cameron
8	14 May 2010	Handa Senior Masters	−20 (64-69-66=199)	7 strokes	(England) Roger Chapman, (Thailand) Boonchu Ruangkit

== Playoff record ==
European Tour playoff record (0–2)

No.	Year	Tournament	Opponent	Result
1	1982	Lufthansa German Open	(West Germany) Bernhard Langer	Lost to par on first extra hole
2	1982	Ebel Swiss Open	(Wales) Ian Woosnam	Lost to par on third extra hole

== Results in major championships ==
Tournament	1978	1979	1980	1981	1982	1983	1984	1985	1986	1987	1988	1989	1990	1991	1992	1993	1994	1995
The Open Championship	T52	T30	CUT	CUT	T47		T55	CUT	CUT	CUT								T94

Note: Longmuir only played in The Open Championship.

Did not play

CUT = missed the half-way cut
"T" indicates a tie for a place

== Team appearances ==
- Europcar Cup (representing Scotland): 1988
- PGA Cup (representing Great Britain and Ireland): 1996 (tie), 2003
- UBS Cup (representing the Rest of the World): 2003 (tie)

== See also ==
- List of golfers with most European Senior Tour wins
