= Gordon Brand Jnr =

Scottish golfer (1958–2019)

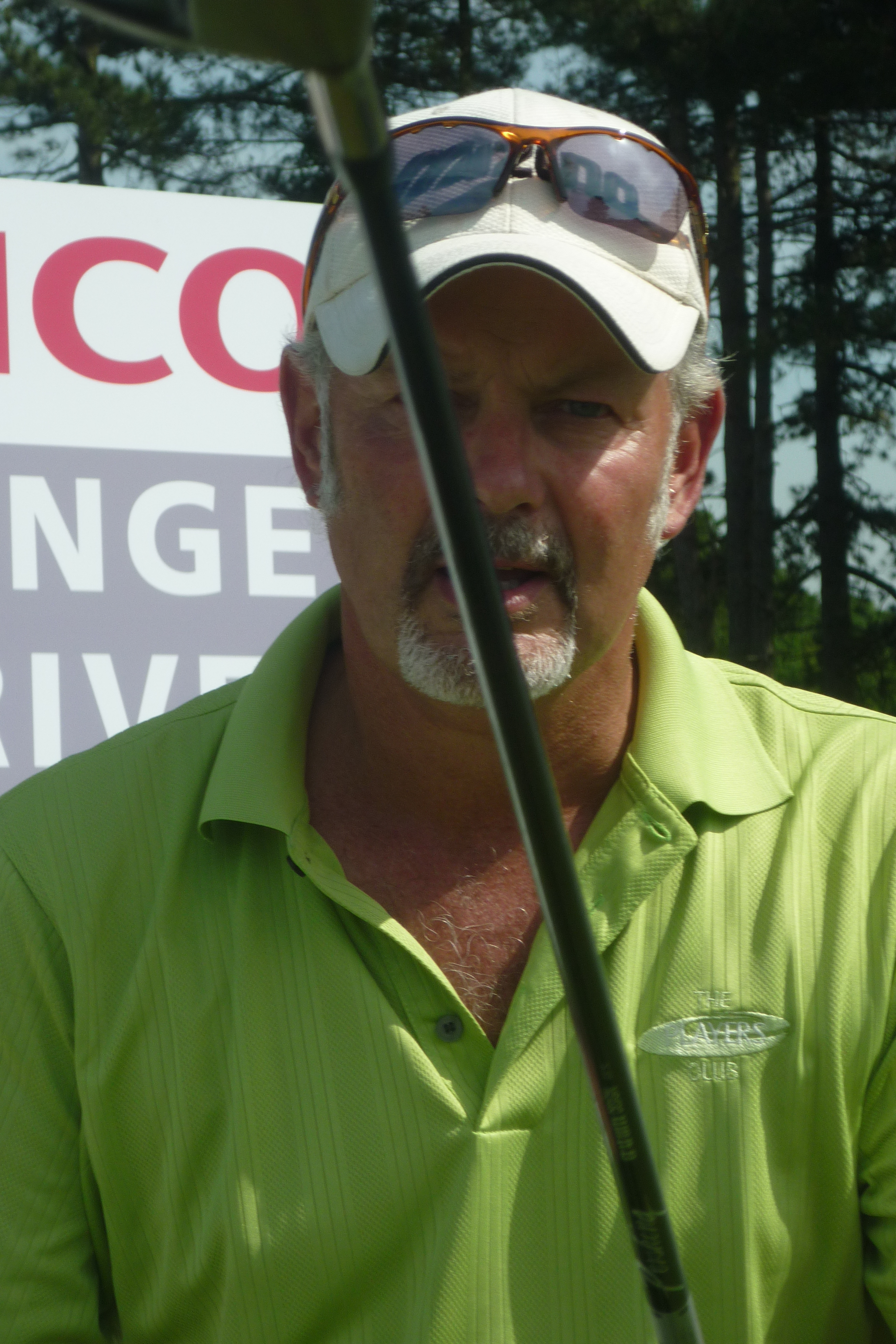

Personal information
- Full name: Gordon Brand
- Nationality: Scotland
- Born: 19 August 1958 Kirkcaldy, Scotland
- Died: 31 July 2019 (aged 60) Ash, Kent, England
- Height: 5 ft 8 in (1.73 m)
- Weight: 161 lb (73 kg; 11.5 st)

Career
- Sport: Golf
- Turned professional: 1981
- Former tours: European Tour; European Senior Tour
- Professional wins: 11
- Highest ranking: 30 (22 May 1988)

Number of wins by tour
- European Tour: 8
- PGA Tour of Australasia: 1
- European Senior Tour: 2

Best results in major championships
- Masters Tournament: DNP
- PGA Championship: DNP
- U.S. Open: T39: 1994
- The Open Championship: T5: 1992

Achievements and awards
- Sir Henry Cotton Rookie of the Year: 1982

Gordon Brand Jnr (19 August 1958 – 31 July 2019) was a Scottish professional golfer. He played on the European Tour, winning eight times, and later the European Senior Tour, winning twice. He played in the 1979 Walker Cup and played twice in the Ryder Cup, in 1987 and 1989.

== Early life and amateur career ==
Brand was born in Kirkcaldy. His father, Gordon Brand Snr, was the club professional at Knowle Golf Club in Bristol from 1969 to 2001. Brand had a successful amateur career and played for Great Britain and Ireland in the 1979 Walker Cup and in the Eisenhower Trophy in 1978 and 1980. He turned professional in July 1981, with a handicap of plus 1, after failing to make the 1981 Walker Cup team.

== Professional career ==
Brand quickly achieved success as a professional. He won the European Tour Qualifying School in November 1981, and went on to win two European Tour events in his rookie season, and being named the Sir Henry Cotton Rookie of the Year for 1982. He went on to accumulate eight wins on the tour in total, the last of them in 1993. He also won the 1988 West End South Australian Open. He made the top ten on the European Tour Order of Merit six times, with a best placing of fourth in 1987. He last made the top one hundred on the Order of Merit in the 2000 season, during which he was runner-up to Ian Poulter in the Italian Open at the age of 42. He continued to play regularly on the tour until 2006.

In the first round of the 1986 Jersey Open he set a European Tour record by making four eagles in a single round.

Brand's two Ryder Cup appearances were in 1987, when Europe won on American soil for the first time, and in 1989 when Europe retained the trophy at The Belfry by tying the match 14 all. Brand had a 2–4–1 win–loss–half record, including one half and one loss in his singles matches. He represented Scotland in the Alfred Dunhill Cup and World Cup many times. Playing with Sam Torrance in the 1984 World Cup of Golf in Italy, Scotland finished joint runners-up behind Spain. Brand had the second best individual score. Brand played in the Open Championship 18 times. His best finish was when was tied for 5th place in 1992, having been tied for second place after two rounds.

After reaching 50, Brand played on the European Senior Tour where he won twice, the 2010 Matrix Jersey Classic and the 2013 WINSTONgolf Senior Open. His best season was 2010 where he had a win and two runner-up finishes to finish 4th in the Order of Merit. He was twice runner-up in the PGA Seniors Championship, in 2008 and 2011, both at Slaley Hall. In 2008, in his first event as a senior, he tied with English golfer Gordon J. Brand after 72 holes, but lost at the sixth hole of a sudden-death playoff. Gordon J. Brand used his middle initial to distinguish himself from Gordon Brand Jnr.

== Death ==
Brand at the age of 60 died suddenly from a heart attack in an ambulance on the 31 July 2019 near Maidstone Kent following a practice round for the Staysure PGA Senior Championship.

== Amateur wins ==
- 1978 Brabazon Trophy, Selborne Salver
- 1979 British Youths Open Amateur Championship, Swedish International Stroke Play Championship
- 1980 Scottish Youths' Amateur Open Stroke Play Championship, Scottish Amateur Open Stroke Play Championship, Golf Illustrated Gold Vase
- 1981 Portuguese Amateur Open Championship, Sunningdale Foursomes (with Alan Lyddon), Hampshire Hog

== Professional wins (11) ==
=== European Tour wins (8) ===
No.	Date	Tournament	Winning score	Margin of victory	Runner(s)-up
1	27 Jun 1982	Coral Classic	−15 (69-70-66-68=273)	3 strokes	(Australia) Greg Norman
2	26 Sep 1982	Bob Hope British Classic	−16 (65-73-65-69=272)	3 strokes	(England) Mark James
3	12 Aug 1984	Celtic International	−8 (67-67-68-70=272)	3 strokes	(Australia) Ian Baker-Finch, (Argentina) Vicente Fernández, (Scotland) Sandy Lyle
4	9 Sep 1984	Panasonic European Open	−10 (67-66-73-64=270)	3 strokes	(Spain) Seve Ballesteros, (Australia) Noel Ratcliffe
5	26 Jul 1987	KLM Dutch Open	−16 (69-67-67-69=272)	1 stroke	(England) David A. Russell
6	2 Aug 1987	Scandinavian Enterprise Open	−11 (64-71-71-71=277)	Playoff	(Sweden) Magnus Persson
7	13 Aug 1989	Benson & Hedges International Open	−12 (64-72-72-64=272)	1 stroke	(England) Derrick Cooper
8	12 Sep 1993	GA European Open (2)	−13 (65-68-71-71=275)	7 strokes	(Wales) Phillip Price, (Northern Ireland) Ronan Rafferty

European Tour playoff record (1–1)

No.	Year	Tournament	Opponent	Result
1	1987	Scandinavian Enterprise Open	(Sweden) Magnus Persson	Won with birdie on first extra hole
2	1992	Heineken Dutch Open	(Germany) Bernhard Langer	Lost to par on second extra hole

=== PGA Tour of Australia wins (1) ===
No.	Date	Tournament	Winning score	Margin of victory	Runners-up
1	12 Nov 1988	West End South Australian Open	−13 (64-69-69-65=267)	7 strokes	(Australia) Greg Alexander, (Australia) Wayne Grady

=== European Senior Tour wins (2) ===
No.	Date	Tournament	Winning score	Margin of victory	Runners-up
1	6 Jun 2010	Matrix Jersey Classic	−15 (63-66-72=201)	5 strokes	(South Africa) Bobby Lincoln, (England) Carl Mason
2	8 Sep 2013	WINSTONgolf Senior Open	−12 (68-68-68=204)	1 stroke	(Paraguay) Ángel Franco, (Scotland) Andrew Oldcorn, (England) David J. Russell

European Senior Tour playoff record (0–2)

No.	Year	Tournament	Opponent	Result
1	2008	De Vere Collection PGA Seniors Championship	(England) Gordon J. Brand	Lost to par on sixth extra hole
2	2009	Benahavis Senior Masters	(England) Carl Mason	Lost to birdie on second extra hole

== Results in major championships ==
Tournament	1981	1982	1983	1984	1985	1986	1987	1988	1989
U.S. Open									
The Open Championship	CUT	CUT	CUT		T47	CUT	T26	T20	CUT

Tournament	1990	1991	1992	1993	1994	1995	1996	1997	1998	1999	2000	2001
U.S. Open					T39							
The Open Championship	CUT	T32	T5	CUT	T60		CUT	CUT	14		T68	T62

Top 10
Did not play

CUT = missed the half-way cut
"T" indicates a tie for a place
Note: Brand never played in the Masters Tournament or the PGA Championship.

== Results in senior major championships ==
Tournament	2009	2010	2011	2012	2013	2014	2015	2016	2017	2018
Senior PGA Championship	CUT			CUT		CUT				
Senior British Open Championship	T32	T41	T12	CUT	CUT	CUT	T51		CUT	CUT

Did not play

"T" indicates a tie for a place
CUT = missed the halfway cut
Note: Brand only played in the Senior PGA Championship and the Senior British Open Championship.

== Team appearances ==
Amateur

- St Andrews Trophy (representing Great Britain & Ireland): 1976 (winners), 1978 (winners), 1980 (winners)
- European Amateur Team Championship (representing Scotland): 1979
- Eisenhower Trophy (representing Great Britain & Ireland): 1978, 1980
- Walker Cup (representing Great Britain & Ireland): 1979

Professional

- World Cup (representing Scotland): 1984, 1985, 1988, 1989, 1990, 1992, 1994
- Dunhill Cup (representing Scotland): 1985, 1986, 1987, 1988, 1989, 1991, 1992, 1993, 1994, 1997
- Four Tours World Championship (representing Europe): 1985, 1988, 1989
- Ryder Cup (representing Europe): 1987 (winners), 1989 (tied, cup retained)

== See also ==
- List of golfers with most European Tour wins
