= Giuseppe Calì (golfer) =

Italian professional golfer

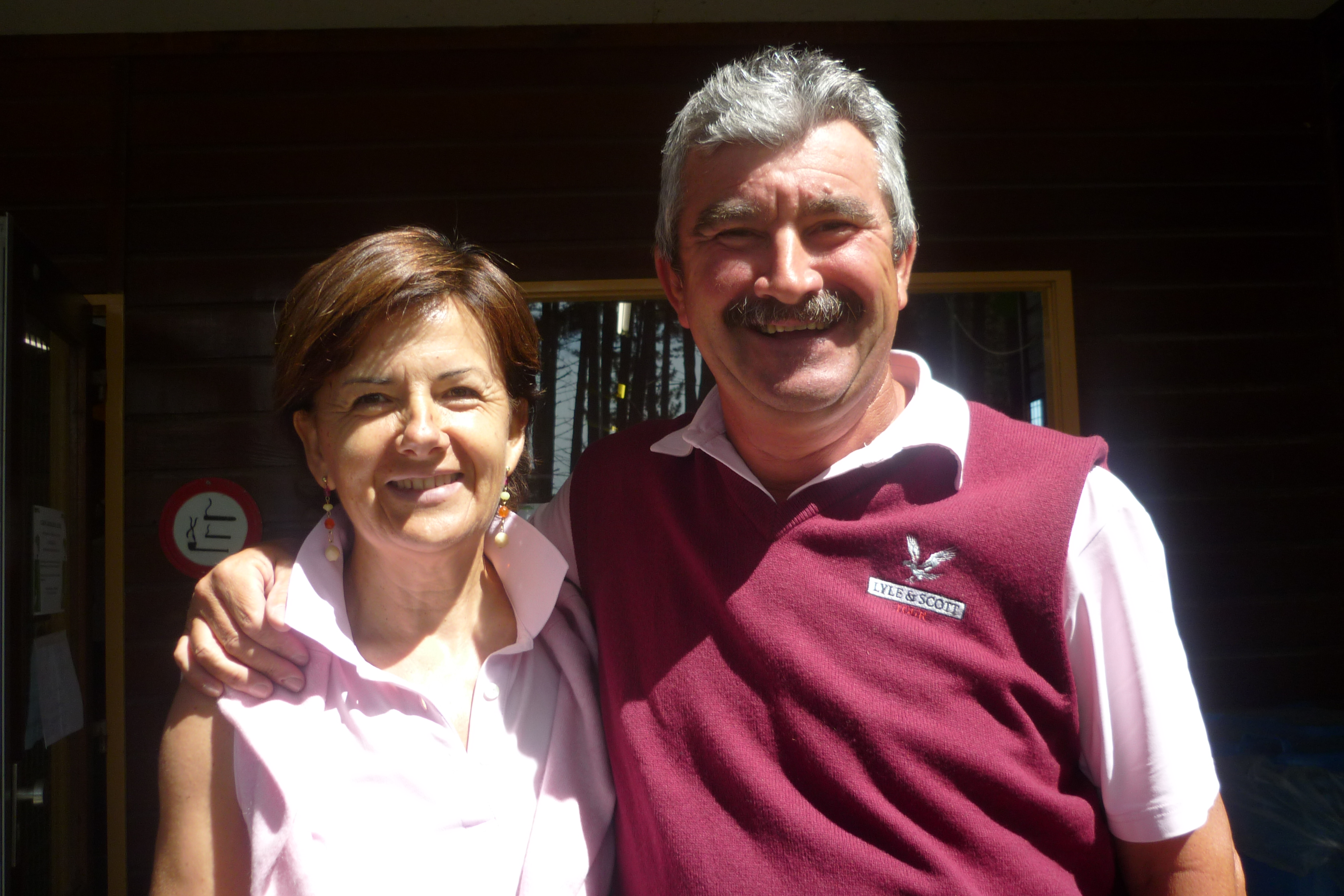
- Calì pictured with his wife Cosetta

Personal information
- Nationality: Italy
- Born: 28 September 1952 (age 74) Mirano, Italy
- Height: 1.78 m (5 ft 10 in)
- Spouse: Cosetta

Career
- Sport: Golf
- Turned professional: 1971
- Current tour: European Seniors Tour
- Former tour: European Tour
- Professional wins: 15

Number of wins by tour
- Challenge Tour: 2
- European Senior Tour: 2
- Other: 11

Achievements and awards
- Challenge Tour Rankings winner: 1990

Giuseppe Calì (born 28 September 1952) is an Italian professional golfer.

== Career ==
Calì was born in Mirano. He turned professional in 1971 and has won twelve professional tournaments in his home country, including five in 1988.

Calì played on the European circuit from the mid-1980s to the late 1990s - sometimes on the European Tour itself and sometimes on the second tier Challenge Tour. His best results on the European Tour were sixth places at the 1990 Italian Open and the 1991 Mediterranean Open. In 1990 he won both the Cerruti Open and the Memorial Olivier Barras on the Challenge Tour and topped the Challenge Tour money rankings. He also claimed more than a dozen non-tour regular career (i.e. under fifty) professional tournaments.

Calì joined the European Seniors Tour in 2003, and has won the 2005 Mobile Cup and the 2006 London Seniors Masters at that level.

Calì represented Italy in the Alfred Dunhill Cup and the World Cup (four times each).

== Professional wins (15) ==
=== Challenge Tour wins (2) ===
No.	Date	Tournament	Winning score	Margin of victory	Runner(s)-up
1	9 Jun 1990	Cerutti Open	−23 (66-67-68-64=265)	12 strokes	(England) David James
2	24 Jun 1990	Memorial Olivier Barras	−4 (280)	3 strokes	(Italy) Emanuele Bolognesi, (Italy) Renato Campagnoli

=== Other wins (11) ===
- 1982 Cerutti Open
- 1984 Italian PGA Championship
- 1985 Italian Native Open
- 1987 Italian Native Open
- 1988 Open La Pinetina, Open di Firenze, Open del Lavoro Luigi, Italian PGA Championship, Cerutti Open
- 1993 Italian Native Open
- 1994 Italian Native Open

=== European Seniors Tour wins (2) ===
No.	Date	Tournament	Winning score	Margin of victory	Runner-up
1	19 Jun 2005	Mobile Cup	−8 (66-70-72=208)	1 stroke	(Scotland) Martin Gray
2	1 Jul 2006	Bendinat London Seniors Masters	−6 (69-74-67=210)	Playoff	(Jamaica) Delroy Cambridge

European Seniors Tour playoff record (1–0)

No.	Year	Tournament	Opponent	Result
1	2006	Bendinat London Seniors Masters	(Jamaica) Delroy Cambridge	Won with birdie on fifth extra hole

== Team appearances ==
- Dunhill Cup (representing Italy): 1986, 1987, 1991, 1992
- World Cup (representing Italy): 1985, 1987, 1988, 1991
