= Seiji Ebihara =

Japanese professional golfer

Seiji Ebihara 海老原 清治
Personal information
- Nationality: Japan
- Born: 2 April 1949 (age 77) Abiko, Chiba, Japan
- Height: 1.74 m (5 ft 9 in)
- Weight: 74 kg (163 lb; 11.7 st)

Career
- Sport: Golf
- Turned professional: 1970
- Former tours: Japan Golf Tour; European Seniors Tour
- Professional wins: 18

Number of wins by tour
- Japan Golf Tour: 1
- European Senior Tour: 6
- Other: 11

Achievements and awards
- European Seniors Tour Order of Merit winner: 2002

Seiji Ebihara (海老原 清治, Ebihara Seiji; born 2 April 1949) is a Japanese professional golfer.

== Career ==
In 1949, Ebihara was born in Abiko, Chiba, Japan. He won one tournament on the Japan Golf Tour and had career earnings of over ¥260 million.

Ebihara joined the European Seniors Tour in 2000 and has won six tournaments on it. In 2002 he topped the Order of Merit. He played in the UBS Cup in 2002.

== Professional wins (18) ==
=== PGA of Japan Tour wins (1) ===
No.	Date	Tournament	Winning score	Margin of victory	Runner-up
1	5 May 1985	Chunichi Crowns	−4 (70-70-66-70=276)	2 strokes	(Japan) Tsuneyuki Nakajima

PGA of Japan Tour playoff record (0–1)

No.	Year	Tournament	Opponents	Result
1	1987	Daikyo Open	(Japan) Hiroshi Makino, (Japan) Isamu Sugita	Sugita won with birdie on second extra hole Ebihara eliminated by par on first hole

=== Other wins (4) ===
- 1982 Chiba Open
- 1984 Shinhan Donghae Open
- 1991 Sanko Grand Summer Championship

=== European Seniors Tour wins (6) ===
No.	Date	Tournament	Winning score	Margin of victory	Runner(s)-up
1	13 May 2001	AIB Irish Seniors Open	−9 (65-71-71=207)	1 stroke	(New Zealand) Simon Owen
2	17 Jun 2001	Microlease Jersey Seniors Masters	−3 (69-73-71=213)	Playoff	(Jamaica) Delroy Cambridge, (England) Denis Durnian
3	19 May 2002	AIB Irish Seniors Open (2)	−8 (66-72-70=208)	2 strokes	(England) Denis Durnian
4	7 Jul 2002	Wales Seniors Open	−4 (68-69-66=203)	3 strokes	(England) Denis Durnian, (Republic of Ireland) Christy O'Connor Jnr
5	4 Aug 2002	De Vere PGA Seniors Championship	−21 (69-67-65-66=267)	10 strokes	(United States) George Burns, (United States) Steve Stull
6	11 Jul 2004	Nigel Mansell Sunseeker International Classic	−13 (70-67-66=203)	2 strokes	(United States) David Oakley

European Seniors Tour playoff record (1–1)

No.	Year	Tournament	Opponents	Result
1	2001	Microlease Jersey Seniors Masters	(Jamaica) Delroy Cambridge, (England) Denis Durnian	Won with birdie on third extra hole Cambridge eliminated by par on first hole
2	2004	De Vere PGA Seniors Championship	(England) Carl Mason, (England) Jim Rhodes	Mason won with birdie on second extra hole Rhodes eliminated by par on first hole

=== Other senior wins (7) ===
- 2000 Castle Hill Open
- 2001 N.Cup Senior Open
- 2002 PGA Philanthropy Big Rizak Senior Tournament
- 2006 Yonex Senior Open Okinawa
- 2007 Kyoei Sangyo Takanosu Senior Open
- 2010 Kanto Pro Grand Senior Championship
- 2013 Kanto Pro Grand Senior Championship

== Team appearances ==
- UBS Warburg Cup (representing the Rest of the World): 2002

== See also ==
- List of golfers with most European Senior Tour wins
