= Peter Fowler =

Australian professional golfer (born 1959)

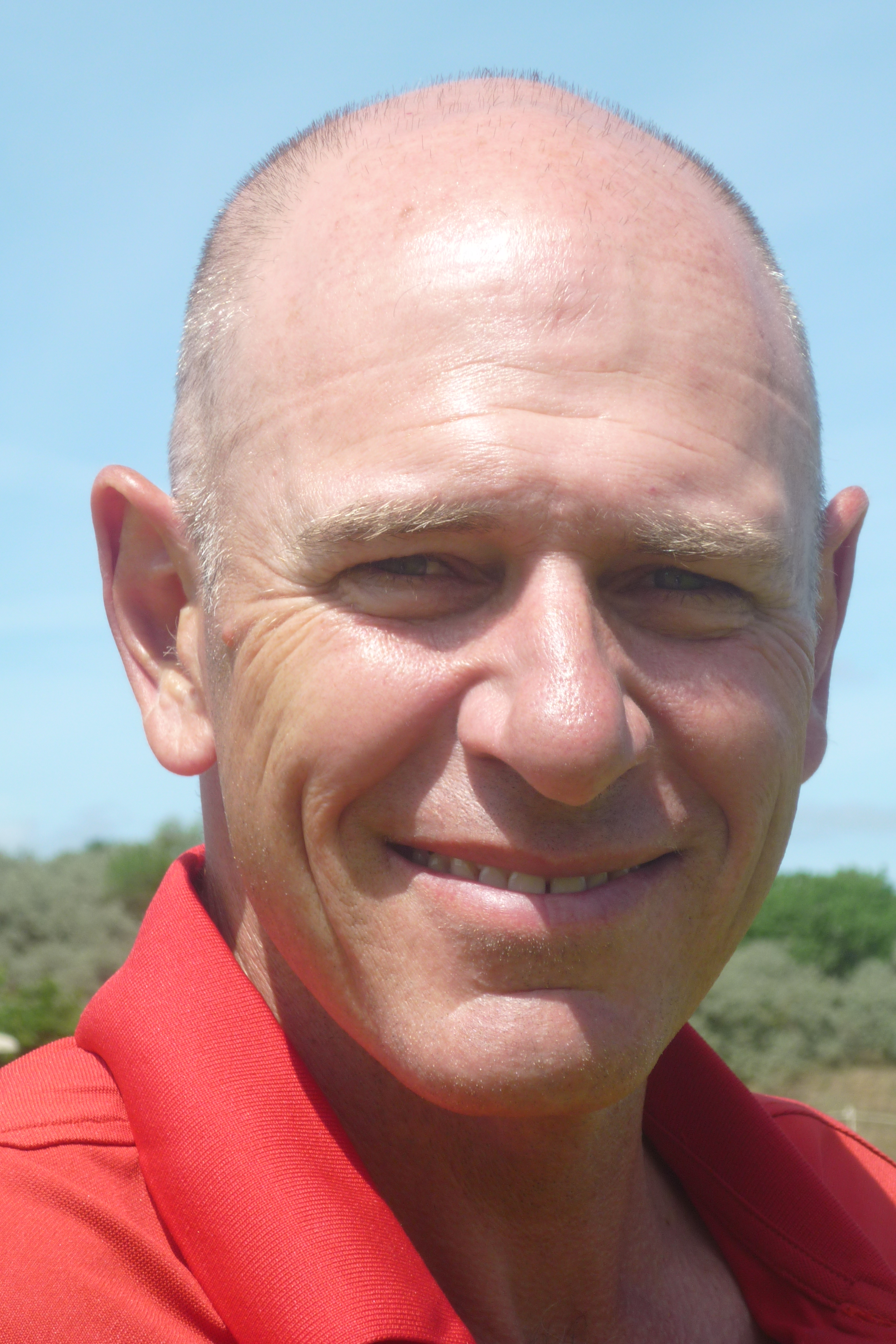

Personal information
- Full name: Peter Randall Fowler
- Nickname: Chook
- Nationality: Australia
- Born: 9 June 1959 (age 67) Hornsby, New South Wales, Australia
- Height: 1.91 m (6 ft 3 in)
- Weight: 89 kg (196 lb; 14.0 st)
- Spouse: Veronica

Career
- Sport: Golf
- Turned professional: 1977
- Former tours: European Tour; PGA Tour of Australasia; Champions Tour; European Senior Tour
- Professional wins: 63
- Highest ranking: 46 (29 April 1990)

Number of wins by tour
- European Tour: 1
- PGA Tour of Australasia: 4
- European Senior Tour: 7
- Other: 48

Best results in major championships
- Masters Tournament: DNP
- PGA Championship: DNP
- U.S. Open: DNP
- The Open Championship: T22: 2003

Achievements and awards
- European Senior Tour Order of Merit winner: 2011

Peter Randall Fowler (born 9 June 1959) is an Australian professional golfer. He played on the European Tour, PGA Tour of Australasia, and the European Senior Tour. His most prestigious win was 1983 Australian Open.

== Early life ==
In 1959, Fowler was born in Hornsby outside Sydney, New South Wales. Fowler developed his skills in golf at Pennant Hills Golf Club in Sydney. Early in his career, he thanked his coach, Ian Alexander, at Pennant Hills.

== Professional career ==
In 1977, Fowler turned professional.

His first win on one of the worlds major professional golf tours was the Australian Open at Kingston Heath Golf Club in 1983. At the time, it was considered one of the most prestigious golf tournaments in the world, outside the four majors, with Jack Nicklaus, Gary Player and Greg Norman among former winners.

He has spent a large part of his career playing on the European Tour, where he made the top one hundred on the Order of Merit every year from 1983 to 1993, with a best ranking of 22nd in 1989. His only European Tour win came at the 1993 BMW International Open in Germany.

After struggling for form in through the mid and late nineties Fowler enjoyed something of an Indian summer between 2002 and 2004, returning to the top hundred for those three seasons, and recording his best finish in The Open Championship in 2003 when he came joint 22nd.

Another career highlight for Fowler was winning the 1989 World Cup for Australia in partnership with Wayne Grady. In addition to the team title, Fowler won the prize for the best individual performance.

In 2009, Fowler joined the European Senior Tour, making his début in the Jersey Seniors Classic, which was played at the same venue, La Moye Golf Club, at which he had made his first appearance on the European Tour in 1983.

== Professional wins (63) ==
=== European Tour wins (1) ===
No.	Date	Tournament	Winning score	Margin of victory	Runner-up
1	8 Aug 1993	BMW International Open	−21 (67-69-68-63=267)	3 strokes	(Wales) Ian Woosnam

European Tour playoff record (0–1)

No.	Year	Tournament	Opponent	Result
1	1986	Jersey Open	(England) John Morgan	Lost to par on first extra hole

=== Asia Golf Circuit wins (1) ===
No.	Date	Tournament	Winning score	Margin of victory	Runners-up
1	29 Mar 1987	Singapore Open	−10 (66-70-65-73=274)	Playoff	(Taiwan) Hsu Sheng-san, (United States) Jeff Maggert

Asia Golf Circuit playoff record (1–0)

No.	Year	Tournament	Opponents	Result
1	1987	Singapore Open	(Taiwan) Hsu Sheng-san, (United States) Jeff Maggert	Won with birdie on third extra hole

=== PGA Tour of Australasia wins (4) ===
No.	Date	Tournament	Winning score	Margin of victory	Runner(s)-up
1	20 Nov 1983	Australian Open	−3 (72-76-68-69=285)	3 strokes	(Australia) Ian Baker-Finch
2	6 Oct 1985	Queensland PGA Championship	−7 (71-68-69-69=277)	1 stroke	(United States) Keith Parker, (Australia) Wayne Riley
3	16 Feb 1986	Robert Boyd Transport Australian Match Play Championship	6 and 5		(Australia) Bob Shearer
4	14 Feb 1993	AMP New Zealand Open	−10 (69-71-67-67=274)	1 stroke	(New Zealand) Elliot Boult

PGA Tour of Australasia playoff record (0–2)

No.	Year	Tournament	Opponent(s)	Result
1	1982	Queensland PGA Championship	(Australia) Paul Foley	Lost to par on first extra hole
2	1993	Ford Australian PGA Championship	(Australia) Ian Baker-Finch, (New Zealand) Grant Waite	Baker-Finch won with birdie on second extra hole

=== Other wins (4) ===
- 1979 Wyong Open
- 1988 French Medal Match Play
- 1989 World Cup (team with Wayne Grady)
- 1989 World Cup (individual)

=== European Senior Tour wins (7) ===
Legend
Tour Championships (1)
Other European Senior Tour (6)

No.	Date	Tournament	Winning score	Margin of victory	Runner(s)-up
1	5 Jun 2011	ISPS Handa Senior Masters	−10 (68-71-70=209)	3 strokes	(Scotland) Andrew Oldcorn
2	3 Jul 2011	Bad Ragaz PGA Seniors Open	−14 (66-65-65=196)	2 strokes	(Scotland) Andrew Oldcorn
3	22 Sep 2013	French Riviera Masters	−11 (68-71-66=205)	3 strokes	(Scotland) Andrew Oldcorn, (Spain) Santiago Luna
4	6 Jun 2015	Acorn Jersey Open	−7 (70-68-71=209)	1 stroke	(Sweden) Anders Forsbrand
5	14 Jun 2015	ISPS Handa PGA Seniors Championship	−12 (68-67-67-70=272)	3 strokes	(Austria) Gordon Manson
6	25 Aug 2018	Willow Senior Golf Classic	−12 (66-69-69=204)	2 strokes	(United States) Clark Dennis, (Scotland) Gary Orr
7	7 Dec 2019	MCB Tour Championship (Seychelles)	−4 (70-69-67=206)	1 stroke	(South Africa) James Kingston

European Senior Tour playoff record (0–2)

No.	Year	Tournament	Opponent(s)	Result
1	2017	Senior Italian Open	(United States) Clark Dennis	Lost to birdie on first extra hole
2	2018	Sharjah Senior Golf Masters	(United States) Clark Dennis, (Thailand) Thaworn Wiratchant	Wiratchant won with par on fourth extra hole Fowler eliminated by par on first hole

=== Asia Pacific Champions Tour wins (2) ===
- 2012 City of South Perth Masters, ISPS Handa Australian Senior Open

=== Japan Senior Tour wins (1) ===
- 2016 ISPS Handa Cup Philanthropy Senior Tournament

=== PGA of Australia Legends Tour wins (43) ===
note: this list is probably incomplete

- 2011 (1) Australian PGA Seniors Championship
- 2012 (1) ISPS Handa Australian Senior Open
- 2013 (3) Methven Corporate Senior Pro-Am, Turton Green Senior Pro-Am at Ashburton, Swanbury Penglase SA PGA Senior Championship
- 2014 (7) Moran Healthcare Group Senior Pro-Am (with (Australia) Mike Harwood), Club Car Pegasus Senior Pro-Am, Terrace Downs Senior Pro-Am, Rebel Sport TV3 Senior Pro-Am, Mini Jumbuk PGA Legends Pro-Am, Audi Solitaire Legends Pro-Am (with (New Zealand) Simon Owen)
- 2015 (7) Fuso Trucks and Buses Legends Pro-Am (with Russell Swanson), Lakes Resort Pauanui Legends Pro-Am (with (Australia) Mike Harwood), Peter Stickley Vendor Advocacy Legends Pro-Am, Northern Health Foundation Annual Corporate Senior Pro-Am, Leahcim Poll Merino and White Suffock Stud Legends Pro-Am, NSW/ACT Senior Foursomes Championships (with Ian Alexander), Roseville First National Real Estate Lan-Dom Mens Gold Mashie & Ladies Pro-Am
- 2016 (5) Fuso Trucks & Buses Cromer Legends Pro-Am, Gleniti Legends Pro-Am, Waimairi Beach Legends Pro-Am (with Mark Tickle), New Zealand PGA Senior Championship, Innovative Pest Consultants Legends Pro-Am
- 2017 (3) Victor Harbor Legends Pro-Am, Gordon Refrigeration SA Seniors PGA Championship, David Mercer Seniors Classic (with David Merriman)
- 2018 (7) Cockram Motor Group Russley Legends Pro-Am (with two others), Ramada NZ PGA Senior Championship, Club Mandalay Legends Pro-Am, David Mercer Senior Classic, MG Plasterers South Australian Seniors PGA Championship, Sylvania BMW Legends Pro-Am Tournament
- 2019 (4) Club Mandalay Legends Pro-Am (with (England) Ben Jackson), The Australian Golf Club Legends Pro-Am, David Mercer Senior Classic, Cranbrook Residences NSW PGA Seniors Championship
- 2020 (1) ICF HAULAGE Legends Pro-Am
- 2022 (1) Whitbread Insurance Brokers Legends Pro-Am (with Brad Burns)
- 2023 (3) The MG Plasterers & Steeline South Australian PGA Seniors Championship, QUBE Logistics Legends Pro-Am @ Aston Hills Golf Club (with (Australia) Euan Walters), Discovery McCracken Legends Pro-Am (with Scott Barr)
- 2024 (1) Ricoh Legends Pro-Am

== Results in major championships ==
Tournament	1983	1984	1985	1986	1987	1988	1989
The Open Championship	CUT	CUT	T56	T70		T52	

Tournament	1990	1991	1992	1993	1994	1995	1996	1997	1998	1999
The Open Championship	T48			T73		CUT				

Tournament	2000	2001	2002	2003	2004	2005	2006	2007	2008
The Open Championship				T22		CUT		CUT	CUT

Note: Fowler only played in The Open Championship.

Did not play

CUT = missed the half-way cut (3rd round cut in 1983 Open Championship)
"T" indicates a tie for a place

== Team appearances ==
- World Cup (representing Australia): 1989 (winners, individual winner)

== See also ==
- 2007 Challenge Tour graduates
- List of golfers with most European Senior Tour wins
