= 2001 Volvo PGA Championship =

Tournament information
- Dates: 25–28 May 2001
- Location: Virginia Water, Surrey, England; 51.40°N 0.59°W
- Courses: Wentworth Club; West Course
- Tour: European Tour

Statistics
- Par: 72
- Length: 7,046 yards (6,443 m)
- Field: 156 players, 72 after cut
- Cut: 143 (−1)
- Prize fund: €3,276,959
- Winner's share: €544,521

Champion
- (Scotland) Andrew Oldcorn
- 272 (−16)

Location map
- Location in England Location in Surrey

The 2001 Volvo PGA Championship was the 47th edition of the Volvo PGA Championship, an annual professional golf tournament on the European Tour. It was held 25–28 May at the West Course of Wentworth Club in Virginia Water, Surrey, England, a suburb southwest of London.

Andrew Oldcorn won by two strokes over Ángel Cabrera to claim his first Volvo PGA Championship.

== Course layout ==
Wentworth Club, West Course
Tee	Rating/Slope	1	2	3	4	5	6	7	8	9	Out	10	11	12	13	14	15	16	17	18	In	Total
Yardage	n/a	470	155	452	501	191	355	399	398	449	3,370	186	398	510	441	179	481	379	571	531	3,676	7,046
Par		4	3	4	5	3	4	4	4	4	35	3	4	5	4	3	4	4	5	5	37	72

== Round summaries ==
=== First round ===
Thursday, 25 May 2001

Place	Player	Score	To par
1	(Argentina) Ángel Cabrera	63	−9
2	(Wales) Phillip Price	65	−7
T3	(Republic of Ireland) Paul McGinley	66	−6
T3	(Australia) Nick O'Hern	66	−6
T3	(Scotland) Andrew Oldcorn	66	−6
T6	(England) Peter Baker	67	−5
T6	(Scotland) Alastair Forsyth	67	−5
T6	(Republic of Ireland) Pádraig Harrington	67	−5
T6	(Sweden) Mikael Lundberg	67	−5
T6	(England) Steve Webster	67	−5

=== Second round ===
Friday, 26 May 2001

Place	Player	Score	To par
1	(Scotland) Andrew Oldcorn	66-66=132	−12
T2	(Argentina) Ángel Cabrera	63-71=134	−10
T2	(Australia) Stephen Leaney	70-64=134	−10
T2	(Wales) Phillip Price	65-69=134	−10
5	(England) Steve Webster	67-68=135	−9
6	(Scotland) Dean Robertson	68-68=136	−8
T7	(Denmark) Thomas Bjørn	68-69=137	−7
T7	(Scotland) Andrew Coltart	68-69=137	−7
T7	(Sweden) Niclas Fasth	69-68=137	−7
T7	(France) Raphaël Jacquelin	69-68=137	−7
T7	(Denmark) Søren Kjeldsen	71-66=137	−7
T7	(Scotland) Paul Lawrie	69-68=137	−7
T7	(Australia) Nick O'Hern	66-71=137	−7

=== Third round ===
Saturday, 27 May 2001

Place	Player	Score	To par
1	(Scotland) Andrew Oldcorn	66-66-69=201	−15
T2	(Argentina) Ángel Cabrera	63-71-72=206	−10
T2	(Sweden) Niclas Fasth	69-68-69=206	−10
T2	(Wales) Phillip Price	65-69-72=206	−10
T5	(New Zealand) Michael Campbell	70-70-67=207	−9
T5	(Spain) José María Olazábal	72-68-67=207	−9
T5	(England) Steve Webster	67-68-72=207	−9
T8	(Scotland) Andrew Coltart	68-69-71=208	−8
T8	(England) Nick Faldo	72-66-70=208	−8
T8	(Australia) Stephen Leaney	70-64-74=208	−8
T8	(Fiji) Vijay Singh	73-65-70=208	−8

=== Final round ===
Sunday, 28 May 2001

Place	Player	Score	To par	Money (€)
1	(Scotland) Andrew Oldcorn	66-66-69-71=272	−16	544,521
2	(Argentina) Ángel Cabrera	63-71-72-68=274	−14	363,014
3	(England) Nick Faldo	72-66-70-67=275	−13	204,524
T4	(New Zealand) Michael Campbell	70-70-67-70=277	−11	138,745
T4	(Sweden) Mathias Grönberg	71-69-72-65=277	−11	138,745
T4	(Wales) Phillip Price	65-69-72-71=277	−11	138,745
7	(Fiji) Vijay Singh	73-65-70-70=278	−10	98,015
T8	(England) Peter Baker	67-72-75-65=279	−9	73,402
T8	(Northern Ireland) Darren Clarke	72-69-68-70=279	−9	73,402
T8	(Scotland) Gary Orr	74-67-69-69=279	−9	73,402

==== Scorecard ====
Hole	1	2	3	4	5	6	7	8	9	10	11	12	13	14	15	16	17	18
Par	4	3	4	5	3	4	4	4	4	3	4	5	4	3	4	4	5	5
(Scotland) Oldcorn	−15	−15	−15	−15	−15	−15	−14	−14	−13	−13	−13	−14	−14	−14	−14	−14	−15	−16
(Argentina) Cabrera	−9	−9	−9	−10	−9	−9	−9	−9	−9	−9	−9	−11	−11	−11	−11	−11	−12	−14
(England) Faldo	−8	−8	−9	−10	−10	−10	−10	−10	−11	−11	−11	−12	−12	−12	−12	−12	−13	−13
(New Zealand) Campbell	−9	−9	−10	−11	−10	−11	−10	−9	−9	−9	−8	−9	−9	−9	−10	−9	−10	−11
(Sweden) Grönberg	−3	−4	−4	−6	−6	−7	−7	−7	−8	−8	−8	−9	−9	−9	−10	−10	−10	−11
(Wales) Price	−10	−10	−10	−11	−10	−10	−10	−9	−9	−9	−9	−9	−10	−10	−10	−10	−11	−11
(Fiji) Singh	−7	−7	−7	−8	−8	−7	−7	−7	−7	−7	−8	−9	−10	−10	−10	−10	−10	−10
(Sweden) Fasth	−9	−8	−8	−8	−8	−8	−8	−8	−8	−8	−8	−9	−9	−9	−9	−9	−7	−7

Cumulative tournament scores, relative to par

Eagle	Birdie	Bogey	Double bogey
