= European Tour Destinations Senior Classic =

Tournament information
- Location: Girona, Spain
- Established: 2017
- Course: PGA Catalunya Resort
- Par: 72
- Length: 7,172 yards (6,558 m)
- Tour: European Senior Tour
- Format: Stroke play
- Prize fund: €250,000
- Month played: July
- Final year: 2019

Tournament record score
- Aggregate: 199 Magnus Persson Atlevi (2018)
- To par: −14 as above

Final champion
- (Spain) José Manuel Carriles
- Location in Spain Location in Catalonia

The European Tour Destinations Senior Classic was a men's senior (over 50) professional golf tournament on the European Senior Tour.

It was held for the first time in June 2017 at Linna Golf near Hämeenlinna, Finland. It was the first European Senior Tour event held in Finland. Linna Golf previously hosted the SK Golf Challenge on the 2009 Challenge Tour.

The second event was held at the Lighthouse Golf & Spa Resort in Balchik, Bulgaria in September 2018. The 2019 event was played at PGA Catalunya Resort near Girona, Spain from 12 to 14 July.

== Winners ==
Year	Winner	Score	To par	Margin of victory	Runner(s)-up
European Tour Destinations Senior Classic
2019	(Spain) José Manuel Carriles	203	−13	3 strokes	(South Africa) Chris Williams
European Tour Properties Senior Classic
2018	(Sweden) Magnus Persson Atlevi	199	−14	3 strokes	(Wales) Stephen Dodd
2017	(Spain) Santiago Luna	206	−10	1 stroke	(Switzerland) André Bossert (Spain) Miguel Ángel Martín
