= José Cóceres =

Argentine professional golfer (born 1963)

Personal information
- Full name: José Eusebio Cóceres
- Nationality: Argentina
- Born: 14 August 1963 (age 63) Chaco, Argentina
- Height: 5 ft 11 in (1.80 m)
- Weight: 170 lb (77 kg; 12 st)

Career
- Sport: Golf
- Turned professional: 1986
- Current tour: European Senior Tour
- Former tours: PGA Tour; European Tour; Champions Tour
- Professional wins: 35
- Highest ranking: 16 (21 October 2001)

Number of wins by tour
- PGA Tour: 2
- European Tour: 2
- European Senior Tour: 2
- Other: 29

Best results in major championships
- Masters Tournament: CUT: 2001, 2002
- PGA Championship: T10: 2002
- U.S. Open: T52: 2001
- The Open Championship: T34: 2003

José Eusebio Cóceres (born 14 August 1963) is an Argentine professional golfer who spent many years on the European Tour and the PGA Tour.

== Early life ==
Cóceres was born in Argentina's Chaco province. He is one of 11 children who grew up in a two-bedroom house. He became a caddie and taught himself the game.

== Professional career ==
In 1986, Cóceres turned professional and won a place on the European Tour at its 1990 Qualifying School. After struggling in 1991 and 1992 he performed steadily on the tour from 1993 onwards and in 2000 he reached a career high of thirteenth on the Order of Merit. His two European Tour wins came at the 1994 Heineken Open Catalonia and the 2000 Dubai Desert Classic.

In 2001, Cóceres switched to the PGA Tour. His first season in the U.S. was very inconsistent, with seven missed cuts and only two top ten finishes, but those top ten finishes were wins at the WorldCom Classic - The Heritage of Golf and the National Car Rental Golf Classic Disney. He was the first Argentine to win on the PGA Tour since Roberto De Vicenzo at the 1968 Houston Champions International. He broke his arm before the start of the 2002 season, and has struggled for form since. He has featured in the top 20 of the Official World Golf Rankings. Cóceres did not play on the PGA Tour from 2009 to 2013 due to an injured left wrist.

Cóceres has won several tournaments in his home country and elsewhere in South America. In 2002 he became the third golfer to receive Argentina's highest sports award, the Olimpia de Oro ("Golden Olympia").

== Professional wins (35) ==
=== PGA Tour wins (2) ===
No.	Date	Tournament	Winning score	Margin of victory	Runner-up
1	16 Apr 2001	WorldCom Classic - The Heritage of Golf	−11 (68-70-64-71=273)	Playoff	(United States) Billy Mayfair
2	21 Oct 2001	National Car Rental Golf Classic Disney	−23 (68-65-64-68=265)	1 stroke	(United States) Davis Love III

PGA Tour playoff record (1–2)

No.	Year	Tournament	Opponent(s)	Result
1	2001	WorldCom Classic - The Heritage of Golf	(United States) Billy Mayfair	Won with par on fifth extra hole
2	2007	Mayakoba Golf Classic	(United States) Fred Funk	Lost to birdie on second extra hole
3	2007	The Honda Classic	(Colombia) Camilo Villegas, (United States) Boo Weekley, (United States) Mark Wilson	Wilson won with birdie on third extra hole Villegas and Weekley eliminated by par on second hole

=== European Tour wins (2) ===
No.	Date	Tournament	Winning score	Margin of victory	Runner(s)-up
1	24 Apr 1994	Heineken Open Catalonia	−13 (70-69-67-69=275)	3 strokes	(France) Jean-Louis Guépy
2	5 Mar 2000	Dubai Desert Classic	−14 (64-69-68-73=274)	2 strokes	(Republic of Ireland) Paul McGinley, (Sweden) Patrik Sjöland

=== Tour de las Américas wins (1) ===
No.	Date	Tournament	Winning score	Margin of victory	Runner-up
1	4 Dec 2011	Torneo de Maestros^{1}	−8 (66-69-67-74=276)	4 strokes	(Argentina) Ricardo González

^{1}Co-sanctioned by the TPG Tour

=== TPG Tour wins (2) ===
No.	Date	Tournament	Winning score	Margin of victory	Runner-up
1	4 Dec 2011	Torneo de Maestros^{1}	−8 (66-69-67-74=276)	4 strokes	(Argentina) Ricardo González
2	24 Oct 2015	Gran Premio Los Pingüinos	−9 (66-69=135)	2 strokes	(Argentina) Julio Zapata

^{1}Co-sanctioned by the Tour de las Américas

=== Other wins (13) ===
- 1988 (1) Los Lagartos Grand Prix (Argentina)
- 1989 (1) Pinamar Open (Argentina)
- 1992 (2) Montevideo Open (Uruguay), Los Cardales Challenge (Argentina)
- 1993 (2) Pinamar Open (Argentina), Los Cardales Challenge (Argentina)
- 1994 (2) Ituzaingo Grand Prix (Argentina), Mendoza Open (Argentina)
- 1995 (1) Tournament of Champions (Argentina)
- 2003 (1) Argentine PGA Championship
- 2004 (2) Argentine Open, Argentine PGA Championship
- 2007 (1) Campeonato Metropolitano (Argentina)
- 2019 Abierto Mixto de Jordania Categoría Senior

=== European Senior Tour wins (2) ===
No.	Date	Tournament	Winning score	Margin of victory	Runner(s)-up
1	7 Jul 2019	Swiss Seniors Open	−11 (65-68-66=199)	2 strokes	(England) Peter Baker, (Australia) Peter O'Malley, (Wales) Phillip Price, (France) Jean-François Remésy, (South Africa) Chris Williams
2	29 Sep 2019	Murhof Legends – Austrian Senior Open	−19 (66-62-69=197)	4 strokes	(Scotland) Paul Lawrie

=== Senior Tour of Argentina wins (6) ===
- 2014 Tour Senior Championship (1)
- 2015 Chino Fernández Senior Classic
- 2018 24° The Open Championship Of Seniors (1), Tour Senior Championship (2)
- 2019 25° The Open Championship Of Seniors (2)
- 2020 Gran Premio Senior PGA Campo Chico

Source:'

=== Argentine Tour Senior de la PGA Argentina wins (7) ===
- 2017 8° Fourball institucional of Profesionals of Golf of Argentine (Las Praderas de Lujan)
- 2019 1° Fourball institucional of Profesionals of Golf of Argentine (Cuba Fatima Golf), 3° Fourball institucional of Profesionals of Golf of Argentine (Reserva Cardales Golf), 6° Fourball institucional of Profesionals of Golf of Argentine (Reserva Cardales Golf)
- 2020 Final Fourball institucional of Profesionals of Golf of Argentine (San Sebastian)
- 2025 3° Fourball institucional of Profesionals of Golf of Argentine (Mercedes Golf Club), 6° Fourball institucional of Profesionals of Golf of Argentine (Medal Country Club)

== Results in major championships ==
Tournament	1992	1993	1994	1995	1996	1997	1998	1999
Masters Tournament								
U.S. Open								
The Open Championship	T45			T96	CUT	T44		
PGA Championship								

Tournament	2000	2001	2002	2003	2004	2005	2006	2007
Masters Tournament		CUT	CUT					
U.S. Open		T52	CUT					
The Open Championship	T36	CUT	CUT	T34				
PGA Championship	CUT	T16	T10	T51				CUT

Top 10
Did not play

CUT = missed the half-way cut
"T" = tied

=== Summary ===
Tournament	Wins	2nd	3rd	Top-5	Top-10	Top-25	Events	Cuts made
Masters Tournament	0	0	0	0	0	0	2	0
U.S. Open	0	0	0	0	0	0	2	1
The Open Championship	0	0	0	0	0	0	8	5
PGA Championship	0	0	0	0	1	2	5	3
Totals	0	0	0	0	1	2	17	9

- Most consecutive cuts made – 3 (2002 PGA – 2003 PGA)
- Longest streak of top-10s – 1

== Results in The Players Championship ==
Tournament	2003	2004	2005	2006	2007	2008
The Players Championship	WD		81		5	T66

Top 10
Did not play

WD = withdrew
"T" = Tied

== Results in World Golf Championships ==
Tournament	2000	2001	2002
Match Play		R64	
Championship	T14	NT^{1}	T36
Invitational			T75

^{1}Cancelled due to 9/11

Did not play

QF, R16, R32, R64 = Round in which player lost in match play
"T" = Tied
NT = No tournament

== Team appearances ==
- Alfred Dunhill Cup (representing Argentina): 1993, 1995, 1997, 1998, 2000
- World Cup (representing Argentina): 1989, 1997

Awards
Preceded by (Argentina) Las Leonas	Olimpia de Oro; 2001	Succeeded by (Argentina) Cecilia Rognoni
