= 2016 European Senior Tour =

Golf tour season

2016 European Senior Tour season
- Duration: 26 May 2016 – 11 December 2016
- Number of official events: 13
- Order of Merit: (England) Paul Broadhurst
- Rookie of the Year: (Sweden) Magnus Persson Atlevi

The 2016 European Senior Tour was the 25th season of the European Senior Tour, the main professional golf tour in Europe for men aged 50 and over.

== Schedule ==
The following table lists official events during the 2016 season.

| Date | Tournament | Host country | Purse (€) | Winner (Note: The number in brackets after each winner's name is the number of European Senior Tour events they had won up to and including that tournament. This information is only shown for European Senior Tour members.) | Notes |
|---|---|---|---|---|---|
| 29 May | Senior PGA Championship | United States | US$2,750,000 | (United States) Rocco Mediate (n/a) | Senior major championship |
| 5 Jun | SSE Enterprise Wales Senior Open | Wales | £250,000 | (China) Zhang Lianwei (1) | |
| 11 Jun | Acorn Jersey Open | Jersey | £200,000 | (Austria) Gordon Manson (2) | |
| 3 Jul | Swiss Seniors Open | Switzerland | 300,000 | (United States) Tim Thelen (5) | |
| 10 Jul | WINSTONgolf Senior Open | Germany | 350,000 | (Scotland) Andrew Oldcorn (2) | |
| 24 Jul | The Senior Open Championship | Scotland | £1,350,000 | (England) Paul Broadhurst (2) | Senior major championship |
| 14 Aug | U.S. Senior Open | United States | US$3,750,000 | (United States) Gene Sauers (n/a) | Senior major championship (Note: Official win; unofficial money.) |
| 21 Aug | Prostate Cancer UK Scottish Senior Open | Scotland | £250,000 | (England) Paul Eales (1) | |
| 28 Aug | Willow Senior Golf Classic | England | £350,000 | (England) Gary Marks (1) | New tournament |
| 4 Sep | Travis Perkins Masters | England | £340,000 | (Switzerland) André Bossert (1) | |
| 11 Sep | Paris Legends Championship | France | 350,000 | (Sweden) Magnus Persson Atlevi (1) | New tournament |
| 23 Oct | Senior Italian Open | Italy | 350,000 | (Wales) Stephen Dodd (1) | |
| 11 Dec | MCB Tour Championship | Mauritius | 450,000 | (England) Barry Lane (5) | Tour Championship |

== Order of Merit ==
The Order of Merit was based on prize money won during the season, calculated in Euros.

| Position | Player | Prize money (€) |
|---|---|---|
| 1 | (England) Paul Broadhurst | 399,285 |
| 2 | (Sweden) Magnus Persson Atlevi | 211,557 |
| 3 | (Switzerland) André Bossert | 144,866 |
| 4 | (Australia) Peter Fowler | 138,945 |
| 5 | (England) Barry Lane | 128,760 |

== Awards ==
| Award | Winner | Ref. |
|---|---|---|
| Rookie of the Year | (Sweden) Magnus Persson Atlevi | |
