= David Shacklady =

English golfer

Personal information
- Nationality: England
- Born: 19 April 1967 (age 59) Ormskirk, Lancashire, England

Career
- Sport: Golf
- Status: Professional
- Current tour: European Senior Tour
- Professional wins: 3

Number of wins by tour
- European Senior Tour: 3

Best results in major championships
- Masters Tournament: DNP
- PGA Championship: DNP
- U.S. Open: DNP
- The Open Championship: CUT: 1998, 2007

David Shacklady (born 19 April 1967) is an English professional golfer who plays on the European Senior Tour, where he has won three times.

== Professional career ==
Shacklady turned professional in the late 1980s but never played on any of the major tours, competing mostly in regional PGA events in the north of England. He occasionally played in important events, qualifying for the Open Championship in 1998 and 2007 and playing in the British PGA Championship in 1997, 2004 and 2008, although he missed the cut on each occasion.

Shacklady played in the qualifying school for the 2017 European Senior Tour in late January and early February 2017. He was one of three players tying for fifth place and with only five places available a playoff was required. Shacklady missed out when Jean-Pierre Sallat made a birdie on the first playoff hole.

Shacklady tried again at the 2018 European Senior Tour qualifying school and by finishing fourth he gained a place on the tour. In August he won the Russian Open Golf Championship (Senior), finishing two strokes ahead of Stephen Dodd and Phillip Price. He tied for third place in two events and finished 11th in the Order of Merit.

Shacklady continued his good form on the 2019 European Senior Tour. He tied for third place in two events in the early part of the season before winning the Sinclair Invitational and the Paris Legends Championship in September.

== Professional wins (3) ==
=== European Senior Tour wins (3) ===
No.	Date	Tournament	Winning score	Margin of victory	Runner(s)-up
1	19 Aug 2018	VTB Russian Open Golf Championship	−8 (71-68-69=208)	2 strokes	(Wales) Stephen Dodd, (Wales) Phillip Price
2	1 Sep 2019	Sinclair Invitational	−11 (68-71-66=205)	1 stroke	(Austria) Markus Brier
3	22 Sep 2019	Paris Legends Championship	−13 (69-66-68=203)	Playoff	(France) Jean-François Remésy

European Senior Tour playoff record (1–0)

No.	Year	Tournament	Opponent	Result
1	2019	Paris Legends Championship	(France) Jean-François Remésy	Won with par on first extra hole

== Team appearances ==
- PGA Cup (representing Great Britain and Ireland): 2011
