= Gary Marks (golfer) =

English golfer (born 1963)

Personal information
- Nationality: England
- Born: 25 December 1963 (age 62) Sidmouth, Devon, England
- Height: 1.80 m (5 ft 11 in)
- Weight: 72 kg (159 lb; 11.3 st)

Career
- Sport: Golf
- Turned professional: 1983
- Current tour: European Senior Tour
- Former tours: Challenge Tour; Alps Tour
- Professional wins: 6

Number of wins by tour
- Challenge Tour: 1
- European Senior Tour: 2
- Other: 3

Gary Marks (born 25 December 1963) is an English professional golfer.

== Career ==
=== Amateur ===
Marks earned his first European Tour start at the 1981 Martini International and made his first cut a month later at the Greater Manchester Open, aged seventeen and still an amateur. He turned professional in 1983.

=== Professional ===
He managed to get his European Tour card at Qualifying School, but a freak accident during the off season prior to taking up his European Tour membership stopped him from being able to play the next season, and the chance to play on the European Tour eluded him.

In 1994, upon visiting relatives of his future wife in Poland, it just so happened that the Polish Open were on the same week. Marks joined and went on to win it, in the process earning a spot at the 1995 and 1996 Sarazen World Open, an unofficial PGA Tour event held near Atlanta, Georgia where winners of national open golf championships around the world were invited to play. After playing a round with and outscoring Mark Calcavecchia, Marks ended the 1996 Sarazen World Open as the top European, tied for 11th place along with Mark McNulty.

Marks played on the Challenge Tour 1995–1999. He was runner-up at the 1995 Danish Open before he won the 1996 Alianca UAP Challenger. He was again runner-up at the 1997 Memorial Olivier Barras. In 2006 he won the Open de Neuchatel on the Alps Tour, as well as the inaugural PGA Play-offs at Woodhall Spa.

=== Senior tour ===
Marks started 2015 by finishing in a tie for second place in the European Senior Tour Qualifying School Finals and played regularly on the tour that year. His best finishes were a tie for fourth place in the French Riviera Masters and a tie for sixth place in the WINSTONgolf Senior Open in Germany. In 2016 he won the EST Qualifying School Finals and in August he won the Willow Senior Golf Classic, his first victory on the senior tour. He nearly captured a second title the following year at the Sharjah Senior Golf Masters, losing a playoff to Chris Williams.

== Professional wins (6) ==
=== Challenge Tour wins (1) ===
No.	Date	Tournament	Winning score	Margin of victory	Runner-up
1	27 Apr 1996	Alianca UAP Challenger	−18 (69-72-64-65=270)	1 stroke	(France) Jean-Pierre Cixous

=== Alps Tour wins (1) ===
No.	Date	Tournament	Winning score	Margin of victory	Runner-up
1	2 Jul 2006	Open de Neuchâtel	−11 (67-67-68=202)	5 strokes	(Austria) Peter Lepitschnik

=== Other wins (2) ===
- 1994 Polish Open
- 2006 PGA Play-offs

=== European Senior Tour wins (2) ===
No.	Date	Tournament	Winning score	Margin of victory	Runner-up
1	28 Aug 2016	Willow Senior Golf Classic	−14 (67-63-72=202)	2 strokes	(Australia) Mike Harwood
2	17 Sep 2022	WCM Legends Open de France	−9 (68-66-70=204)	3 strokes	(Brazil) Adilson da Silva

European Senior Tour playoff record (0–1)

No.	Year	Tournament	Opponent	Result
1	2017	Sharjah Senior Golf Masters	(South Africa) Chris Williams	Lost to par on first extra hole
