= Senior Italian Open =

Sergio Melpignano Senior Italian Open
Tournament information
- Location: Fasano, Italy
- Established: 2004
- Course: San Domenico Golf Club
- Par: 72
- Length: 6,954 yards (6,359 m)
- Tour: European Senior Tour
- Format: Stroke play
- Prize fund: €400,000
- Month played: October

Tournament record score
- Aggregate: 193 Craig Farrelly (2026)
- To par: −23 as above

Current champion
- (England) Craig Farrelly

Location map
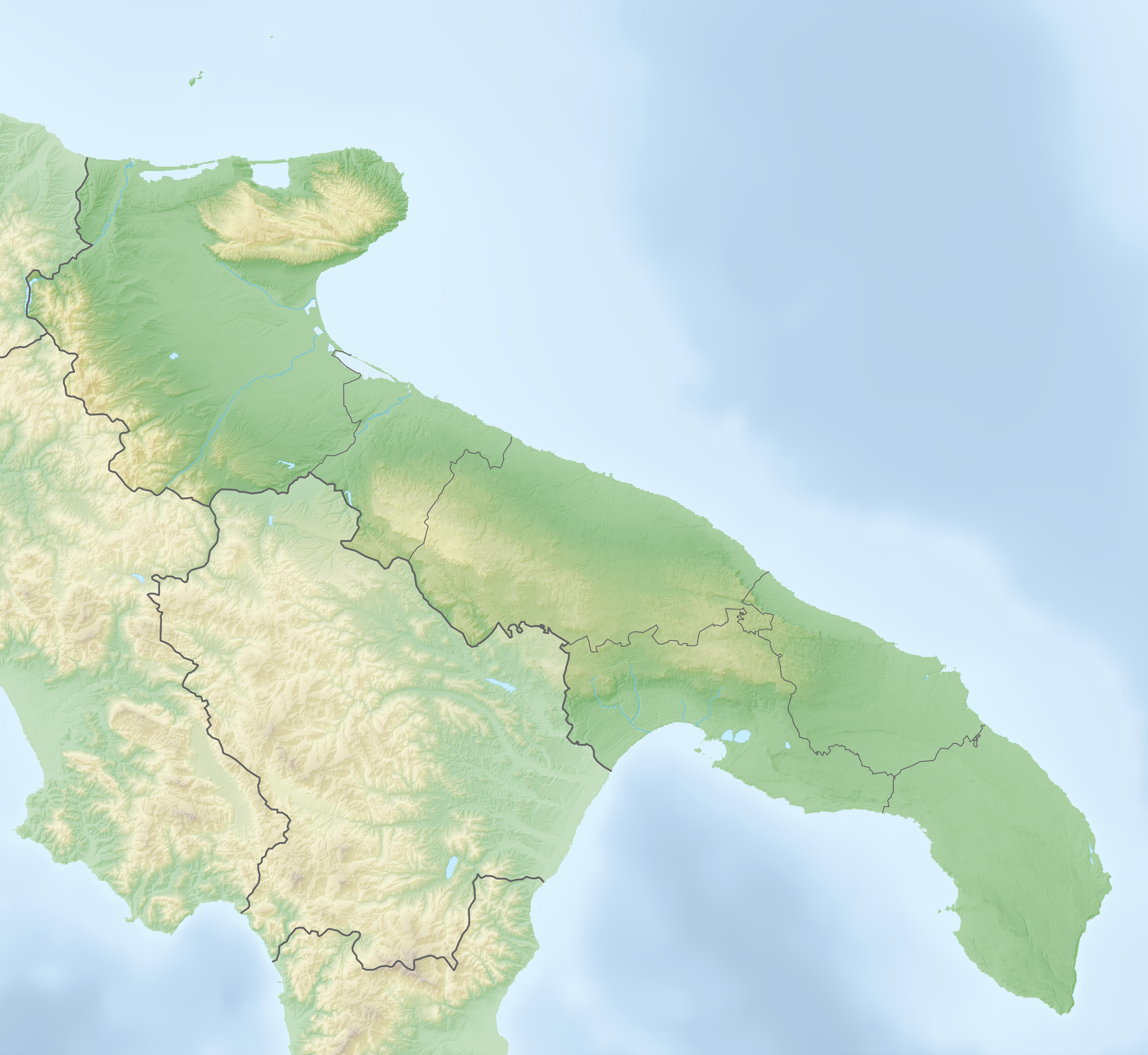
- Location in Italy Location in Apulia

The Senior Italian Open is a men's professional golf tournament for players aged 50 and above which is part of the European Senior Tour schedule. It was played from 2004 to 2008 and then restarted in 2016. The tournament was originally played at GC Venezia, near Venice, but has since been played at GC Arzaga on Lake Garda and GC Udine, Fagagna.

Italy's most successful 20th century male golfer, Costantino Rocca, made his senior debut at the 2007 edition of his home senior open.

== Winners ==
Year	Winner	Score	To par	Margin of victory	Runner(s)-up	Winner's share (€)	Venue
Sergio Melpignano Senior Italian Open
2026	(England) Craig Farrelly	193	−23	5 strokes	(France) Lionel Alexandre (New Zealand) Mark Brown	66,667	San Domenico
2025	(England) Andrew Marshall	202	−14	2 strokes	(France) Lionel Alexandre (Sweden) Johan Edfors	66,667	San Domenico
2024	(Germany) Thomas Gögele	197	−19	3 strokes	(Wales) Bradley Dredge	66,667	San Domenico
2023	(South Africa) James Kingston (2)	200	−16	1 stroke	(England) Peter Baker (Brazil) Adilson da Silva	50,000	San Domenico
Italian Senior Open
2022	(Argentina) Ricardo González	211	−2	3 strokes	(South Africa) James Kingston	45,000	Argentario
Sergio Melpignano Senior Italian Open
2021	(South Africa) James Kingston	205	−11	1 stroke	(Sweden) Joakim Haeggman	44,820	San Domenico
Senior Italian Open
2020	Cancelled due to the COVID-19 pandemic						
2019	(England) Barry Lane	208	−8	Playoff	(France) Marc Farry	45,000	Villaverde
2018	(United States) Clark Dennis (2)	203	−13	Playoff	(Argentina) Rafael Gómez	45,000	Udine
2017	(United States) Clark Dennis	137 (Note: Shortened to 36 holes due to rain.)	−7	Playoff	(Australia) Peter Fowler	52,500	Udine
2016	(Wales) Stephen Dodd	204	−9	1 stroke	(Wales) Phillip Price	52,500	Udine
2009–2015: No tournament
Lake Garda Italian Seniors Open
2008	(England) Peter Mitchell	203	−13	1 stroke	(England) Gordon J. Brand (Wales) Ian Woosnam	30,000	Arzaga
Sharp Italian Seniors Open
2007	(New Zealand) Simon Owen	208	−8	Playoff	(England) Tony Allen (United States) John Benda (England) Carl Mason	30,000	Venezia
2006	(Scotland) Sam Torrance	205	−11	4 strokes	(Republic of Ireland) Eamonn Darcy	26,250	Venezia
Nokia 9300 Italian Seniors Open
2005	(France) Géry Watine	205	−11	Playoff	(Republic of Ireland) Eamonn Darcy	25,500	Venezia
Bosch Italian Seniors Open
2004	(Australia) Terry Gale	211	−5	1 stroke	(England) David J. Russell	24,000	Venezia
