= Willow Senior Golf Classic =

English men's professional golf tournament

Sinclair Invitational
Tournament information
- Location: Ware, Hertfordshire, England
- Established: 2016
- Course: Hanbury Manor
- Par: 72
- Length: 6,894 yards (6,304 m)
- Tour: European Senior Tour
- Format: Stroke play
- Prize fund: £400,000
- Month played: August/September
- Final year: 2019

Tournament record score
- Aggregate: 194 Barry Lane (2017)
- To par: −22 as above

Final champion
- (England) David Shacklady
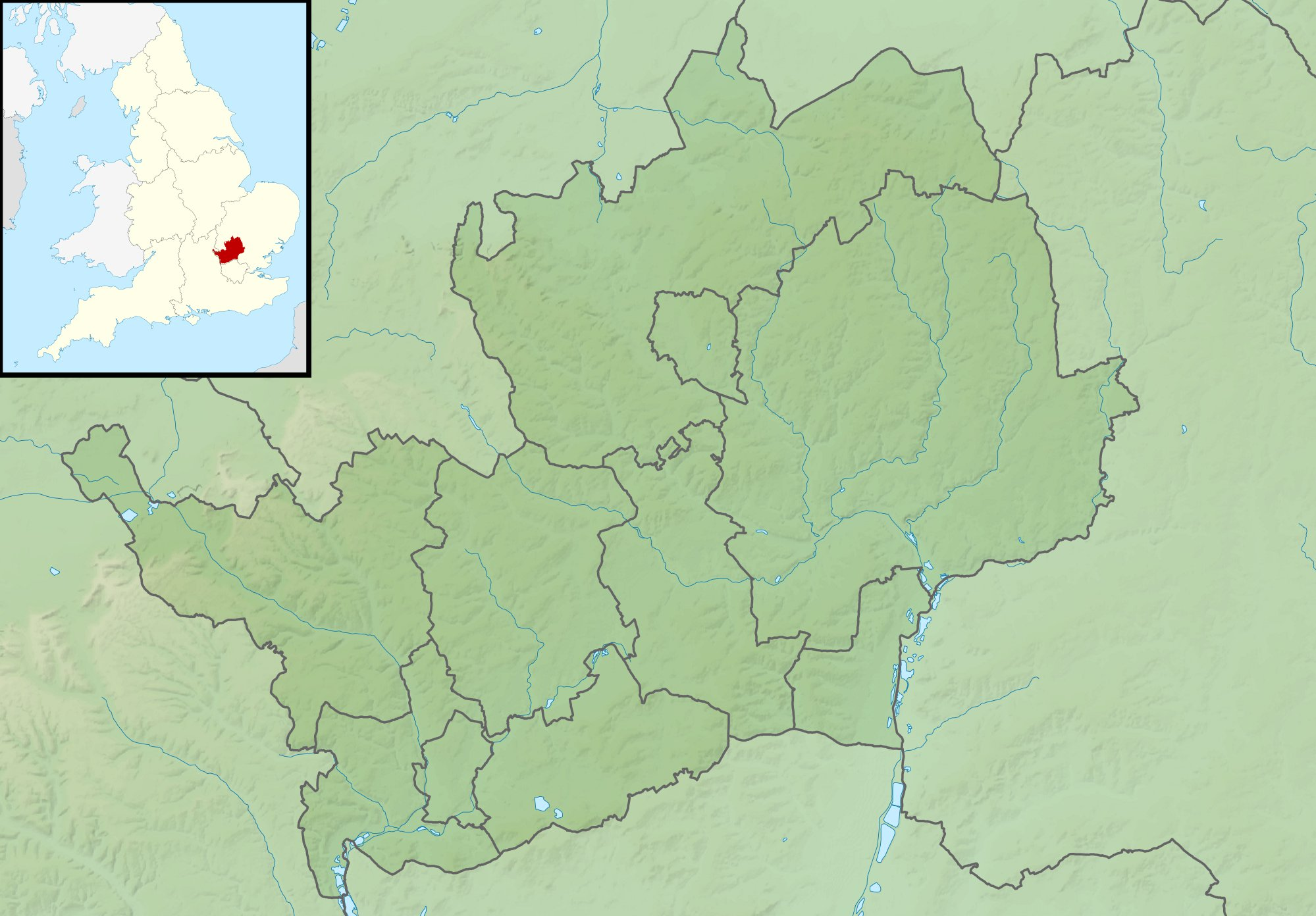
- Location in England Location in Hertfordshire

The Willow Senior Golf Classic was a men's senior (over 50) professional golf tournament on the European Senior Tour. It was held for the first time in September 2016 at Hanbury Manor Country Club, Ware, Hertfordshire, England. The event raises money for the Willow Foundation. The winner was Gary Marks who won the first prize of £52,500 out of total prize-money of £350,000.

== Winners ==
Year	Winner	Score	To par	Margin of victory	Runner(s)-up
Sinclair Invitational
2019	(England) David Shacklady	205	−11	1 stroke	(Austria) Markus Brier
Willow Senior Golf Classic
2018	(Australia) Peter Fowler	204	−12	2 strokes	(United States) Clark Dennis (Scotland) Gary Orr
2017	(England) Barry Lane	194	−22	5 strokes	(Scotland) Gary Orr
2016	(England) Gary Marks	202	−14	2 strokes	(Australia) Mike Harwood
