= Costa Blanca Benidorm Senior Golf Masters =

Golf tournament in Spain

European Tour Destinations Senior Classic
Tournament information
- Location: Benidorm, Spain
- Established: 2018
- Course: Meliã Villaitana Golf Club
- Par: 72
- Length: 6,956 yards (6,361 m)
- Tour: European Senior Tour
- Format: Stroke play
- Prize fund: €300,000
- Month played: November/December
- Final year: 2018

Tournament record score
- Aggregate: 202 Miguel Ángel Jiménez (2018); 202 Paul Streeter (2018)
- To par: −14 as above

Final champion
- (England) Paul Streeter

Location map
- Location in Spain Location in the Valencian Community

The Costa Blanca Benidorm Senior Golf Masters was a men's professional golf tournament for players aged 50 and above which is part of the European Senior Tour. It was first held in late November and early December 2018 at Meliã Villaitana Golf Club, Benidorm, Spain. It was the first European Senior Event to be held in Spain since 2012.

Paul Streeter won the inaugural event, beating Miguel Ángel Jiménez in a playoff. Streeter birdied the first playoff. Earlier he had taken a one stroke lead to the final hole but took a bogey 5.

== Winners ==
Year	Winner	Score	To par	Margin of victory	Runner-up
2018	(England) Paul Streeter	202	−14	Playoff	(Spain) Miguel Ángel Jiménez
