= 2000 Alfred Dunhill Cup =

Coordinates: 56.351484°N 2.816147°W

Tournament information
- Dates: 12–15 October
- Location: St Andrews, Scotland
- Course: Old Course at St Andrews
- Format: Match play

Statistics
- Par: 72
- Length: 7,115 yards (6,506 m)
- Field: 16 teams of 3 players
- Prize fund: £1,000,000
- Winner's share: £300,000

Champion
- Spain (M. Á. Jiménez, M. Á. Martín, J. M. Olazábal)

The 2000 Alfred Dunhill Cup was the 16th and final Alfred Dunhill Cup. It was a team tournament featuring 16 countries, each represented by three players. The Cup was played 12–15 October at the Old Course at St Andrews in Scotland. The sponsor was the Alfred Dunhill company. The Spanish team of Miguel Ángel Jiménez, Miguel Ángel Martín, and José María Olazábal beat the South African team of Ernie Els, David Frost, and Retief Goosen in the final. It was the second win for Spain. The tournament was replaced by the Alfred Dunhill Links Championship in 2001, an official European Tour event.

== Format ==
The Cup was a match play event played over four days. The teams were divided into four four-team groups. The top eight teams were seeded with the remaining teams randomly placed in the bracket. After three rounds of round-robin play, the top team in each group advanced to a single elimination playoff.

In each team match, the three players were paired with their opponents and played 18 holes at medal match play. Matches tied at the end of 18 holes were extended to a sudden-death playoff, unless they could not affect the outcome of the tournament (semi-finals). The tie-breaker within a group was based on match record, then head-to-head.

== Group play ==
=== Round one ===
Group 1

| Wales – 3 | | England – 0 | |
| Player | Score | Player | Score |
|---|---|---|---|
| Ian Woosnam | 72 | Roger Chapman | 73 |
| Phillip Price | 70 | Brian Davis | 73 |
| David Park | 67 | Jamie Spence | 73 |

| Scotland – 1 | | Germany – 2 | |
| Player | Score | Player | Score |
|---|---|---|---|
| Gary Orr | 70 | Bernhard Langer | 66 |
| Andrew Coltart | 70 | Thomas Gögele | 71 |
| Colin Montgomerie | 70 | Sven Strüver | 66 |

Group 2

| South Africa – 2 | | France – 1 | |
| Player | Score | Player | Score |
|---|---|---|---|
| David Frost | 68 | Jean-François Remésy | 74 |
| Retief Goosen | 72 | Raphaël Jacquelin | 70 |
| Ernie Els | 68 | Thomas Levet | 74 |

| New Zealand – 1 | | Ireland – 2 | |
| Player | Score | Player | Score |
|---|---|---|---|
| Greg Turner | 69 | Des Smyth | 69 |
| Grant Waite | 71 | Pádraig Harrington | 68 |
| Michael Campbell | 69 | Paul McGinley | 67 |

Turner won on the first playoff hole.

Group 3

| Spain – 3 | | China – 0 | |
| Player | Score | Player | Score |
|---|---|---|---|
| Miguel Ángel Jiménez | 66 | Wu Xiang-bing | 79 |
| Miguel Ángel Martín | 70 | Zhang Lian-wei | 71 |
| José María Olazábal | 66 | Liang Wenchong | 71 |

| Sweden – 2 | | Zimbabwe – 1 | |
| Player | Score | Player | Score |
|---|---|---|---|
| Patrik Sjöland | 72 | Mark McNulty | 67 |
| Per-Ulrik Johansson | 69 | Tony Johnstone | 75 |
| Mathias Grönberg | 69 | Nick Price | 73 |

Group 4

| Australia – 2 | | United States – 1 | |
| Player | Score | Player | Score |
|---|---|---|---|
| Stephen Leaney | 67 | John Daly | 70 |
| Nick O'Hern | 65 | Larry Mize | 71 |
| Peter O'Malley | 73 | Tom Lehman | 68 |

| Argentina – 3 | | Japan – 0 | |
| Player | Score | Player | Score |
|---|---|---|---|
| Eduardo Romero | 70 | Tetsu Nishikawa | 72 |
| Ángel Cabrera | 70 | Isao Aoki | 71 |
| José Cóceres | 65 | Tsukasa Watanabe | 71 |

=== Round two ===
Group 1

| Scotland – 2 | | England – 1 | |
| Player | Score | Player | Score |
|---|---|---|---|
| Colin Montgomerie | 69 | Brian Davis | 70 |
| Andrew Coltart | 68 | Jamie Spence | 73 |
| Gary Orr | 69 | Roger Chapman | 69 |

Chapman won on the first playoff hole.

| Wales – 2 | | Germany – 1 | |
| Player | Score | Player | Score |
|---|---|---|---|
| Ian Woosnam | 70 | Bernhard Langer | 72 |
| David Park | 71 | Sven Strüver | 71 |
| Phillip Price | 69 | Thomas Gögele | 70 |

Strüver won on the first playoff hole.

Group 2

| New Zealand – 3 | | France – 0 | |
| Player | Score | Player | Score |
|---|---|---|---|
| Greg Turner | 73 | Jean-François Remésy | 74 |
| Grant Waite | 70 | Raphaël Jacquelin | 72 |
| Michael Campbell | 69 | Thomas Levet | 70 |

| South Africa – 3 | | Ireland – 0 | |
| Player | Score | Player | Score |
|---|---|---|---|
| David Frost | 66 | Des Smyth | 68 |
| Retief Goosen | 71 | Paul McGinley | 71 |
| Ernie Els | 67 | Pádraig Harrington | 69 |

Goosen won on the first playoff hole.

Group 3

| Sweden – 3 | | China – 0 | |
| Player | Score | Player | Score |
|---|---|---|---|
| Patrik Sjöland | 67 | Liang Wenchong | 72 |
| Per-Ulrik Johansson | 72 | Wu Xiang-bing | 80 |
| Mathias Grönberg | 71 | Zhang Lian-wei | 72 |

| Spain – 2 | | Zimbabwe – 1 | |
| Player | Score | Player | Score |
|---|---|---|---|
| Miguel Ángel Martín | 73 | Tony Johnstone | 72 |
| Miguel Ángel Jiménez | 67 | Nick Price | 68 |
| José María Olazábal | 67 | Mark McNulty | 71 |

Group 4

| Australia – 3 | | Japan – 0 | |
| Player | Score | Player | Score |
|---|---|---|---|
| Nick O'Hern | 70 | Isao Aoki | 71 |
| Stephen Leaney | 73 | Tsukasa Watanabe | 74 |
| Peter O'Malley | 69 | Tetsu Nishikawa | 70 |

| Argentina – 3 | | United States – 0 | |
| Player | Score | Player | Score |
|---|---|---|---|
| Eduardo Romero | 70 | Larry Mize | 72 |
| José Cóceres | 73 | John Daly | 75 |
| Ángel Cabrera | 68 | Tom Lehman | 71 |

=== Round three ===
Group 1

| Scotland – 0 | | Wales – 3 | |
| Player | Score | Player | Score |
|---|---|---|---|
| Colin Montgomerie | 73 | Ian Woosnam | 73 |
| Andrew Coltart | 72 | David Park | 70 |
| Gary Orr | 72 | Phillip Price | 69 |

Woosnam won on the second playoff hole.

| England – 0 | | Germany – 3 | |
| Player | Score | Player | Score |
|---|---|---|---|
| Jamie Spence | 76 | Bernhard Langer | 71 |
| Roger Chapman | 72 | Thomas Gögele | 69 |
| Brian Davis | 74 | Sven Strüver | 72 |

Group 2

| Ireland – 3 | | France – 0 | |
| Player | Score | Player | Score |
|---|---|---|---|
| Paul McGinley | 67 | Raphaël Jacquelin | 69 |
| Des Smyth | 70 | Jean-François Remésy | 76 |
| Pádraig Harrington | 69 | Thomas Levet | 74 |

| South Africa – 2 | | New Zealand – 1 | |
| Player | Score | Player | Score |
|---|---|---|---|
| Retief Goosen | 71 | Greg Turner | 71 |
| David Frost | 75 | Grant Waite | 71 |
| Ernie Els | 68 | Michael Campbell | 69 |

Goosen won on the first playoff hole.

Group 3

| Zimbabwe – 2 | | China – 1 | |
| Player | Score | Player | Score |
|---|---|---|---|
| Tony Johnstone | 69 | Wu Xiang-bing | 76 |
| Mark McNulty | 71 | Liang Wenchong | 74 |
| Nick Price | 71 | Zhang Lian-wei | 68 |

| Spain – 2 | | Sweden – 1 | |
| Player | Score | Player | Score |
|---|---|---|---|
| Miguel Ángel Martín | 69 | Patrik Sjöland | 70 |
| Miguel Ángel Jiménez | 72 | Per-Ulrik Johansson | 71 |
| José María Olazábal | 72 | Mathias Grönberg | 74 |

Group 4

| Argentina – 2 | | Australia – 1 | |
| Player | Score | Player | Score |
|---|---|---|---|
| Eduardo Romero | 72 | Nick O'Hern | 69 |
| Ángel Cabrera | 70 | Stephen Leaney | 75 |
| José Cóceres | 74 | Peter O'Malley | 76 |

| United States – 2 | | Japan – 1 | |
| Player | Score | Player | Score |
|---|---|---|---|
| John Daly | 73 | Isao Aoki | 73 |
| Tom Lehman | 74 | Tetsu Nishikawa | 75 |
| Larry Mize | 70 | Tsukasa Watanabe | 76 |

Aoki won on the third playoff hole.

=== Standings ===
Group 1
| Country | W | L | MW | ML |
|---|---|---|---|---|
| Wales | 3 | 0 | 8 | 1 |
| Germany | 2 | 1 | 6 | 3 |
| Scotland | 1 | 2 | 3 | 6 |
| England | 0 | 3 | 1 | 8 |

Group 2
| Country | W | L | MW | ML |
|---|---|---|---|---|
| South Africa | 3 | 0 | 7 | 2 |
| Ireland | 2 | 1 | 5 | 4 |
| New Zealand | 1 | 2 | 5 | 4 |
| France | 0 | 3 | 1 | 8 |

Group 3
| Country | W | L | MW | ML |
|---|---|---|---|---|
| Spain | 3 | 0 | 7 | 2 |
| Sweden | 2 | 1 | 6 | 3 |
| Zimbabwe | 1 | 2 | 4 | 5 |
| China | 0 | 3 | 1 | 8 |

Group 4
| Country | W | L | MW | ML |
|---|---|---|---|---|
| Argentina | 3 | 0 | 8 | 1 |
| Australia | 2 | 1 | 6 | 3 |
| United States | 1 | 2 | 3 | 6 |
| Japan | 0 | 3 | 1 | 8 |

== Playoffs ==
=== Bracket ===
Semi-finals
2 | Argentina | 1
3 | Spain | 2
4 | South Africa | 2.5
8 | Wales | 0.5

Final
3 | Spain | 2
4 | South Africa | 1

=== Semi-finals ===
| South Africa – 2.5 | | Wales – 0.5 | |
| Player | Score | Player | Score |
|---|---|---|---|
| David Frost | 70 | Ian Woosnam | 78 |
| Ernie Els | 69 | David Park | 77 |
| Retief Goosen | 68 | Phillip Price | 68 |

| Argentina – 1 | | Spain – 2 | |
| Player | Score | Player | Score |
|---|---|---|---|
| Ángel Cabrera | 71 | José María Olazábal | 69 |
| Eduardo Romero | 69 | Miguel Ángel Jiménez | 71 |
| José Cóceres | 72 | Miguel Ángel Martín | 71 |

=== Final ===
| Spain – 2 | | South Africa – 1 | |
| Player | Score | Player | Score |
|---|---|---|---|
| Miguel Ángel Martín | 74 | David Frost | 74 |
| Miguel Ángel Jiménez | 70 | Retief Goosen | 72 |
| José María Olazábal | 70 | Ernie Els | 68 |

Martín won on the first playoff hole.

== Team results ==
| Country | Place | W | L | MW | ML | Seed |
|---|---|---|---|---|---|---|
| Spain | 1 | 5 | 0 | 11 | 4 | 3 |
| South Africa | 2 | 4 | 1 | 10.5 | 4.5 | 4 |
| Argentina | T3 | 3 | 1 | 9 | 3 | 2 |
| Wales | T3 | 3 | 1 | 8.5 | 3.5 | 8 |
| Australia | T5 | 2 | 1 | 6 | 3 | 7 |
| Germany | T5 | 2 | 1 | 6 | 3 | |
| Sweden | T5 | 2 | 1 | 6 | 3 | 6 |
| Ireland | T5 | 2 | 1 | 5 | 4 | |
| New Zealand | T9 | 1 | 2 | 5 | 4 | 5 |
| Zimbabwe | T9 | 1 | 2 | 4 | 5 | |
| Scotland | T9 | 1 | 2 | 3 | 6 | 1 |
| United States | T9 | 1 | 2 | 3 | 6 | |
| China | T13 | 0 | 3 | 1 | 8 | |
| England | T13 | 0 | 3 | 1 | 8 | |
| France | T13 | 0 | 3 | 1 | 8 | |
| Japan | T13 | 0 | 3 | 1 | 8 | |

== Player results ==
| Country | Player | W | L |
|---|---|---|---|
| Spain | Miguel Ángel Martín | 4 | 1 |
| Spain | José María Olazábal | 4 | 1 |
| Spain | Miguel Ángel Jiménez | 3 | 2 |
| South Africa | Ernie Els | 5 | 0 |
| South Africa | David Frost | 3 | 2 |
| South Africa | Retief Goosen | 2.5 | 2.5 |
| Argentina | Ángel Cabrera | 3 | 1 |
| Argentina | José Cóceres | 3 | 1 |
| Argentina | Eduardo Romero | 3 | 1 |
| Wales | Phillip Price | 3.5 | 0.5 |
| Wales | Ian Woosnam | 3 | 1 |
| Wales | David Park | 2 | 2 |
| Australia | Nick O'Hern | 3 | 0 |
| Australia | Stephen Leaney | 2 | 1 |
| Australia | Peter O'Malley | 1 | 2 |
| Germany | Sven Strüver | 3 | 0 |
| Germany | Bernhard Langer | 2 | 1 |
| Germany | Thomas Gögele | 1 | 2 |
| Sweden | Per-Ulrik Johansson | 3 | 0 |
| Sweden | Mathias Grönberg | 2 | 1 |
| Sweden | Patrik Sjöland | 1 | 2 |
| Ireland | Pádraig Harrington | 2 | 1 |
| Ireland | Paul McGinley | 2 | 1 |
| Ireland | Des Smyth | 1 | 2 |
| New Zealand | Greg Turner | 2 | 1 |
| New Zealand | Grant Waite | 2 | 1 |
| New Zealand | Michael Campbell | 1 | 2 |
| Zimbabwe | Tony Johnstone | 2 | 1 |
| Zimbabwe | Mark McNulty | 2 | 1 |
| Zimbabwe | Nick Price | 0 | 3 |
| Scotland | Andrew Coltart | 2 | 1 |
| Scotland | Colin Montgomerie | 1 | 2 |
| Scotland | Gary Orr | 0 | 3 |
| United States | Tom Lehman | 2 | 1 |
| United States | Larry Mize | 1 | 2 |
| United States | John Daly | 0 | 3 |
| China | Zhang Lian-wei | 1 | 2 |
| China | Liang Wenchong | 0 | 3 |
| China | Wu Xiang-bing | 0 | 3 |
| England | Roger Chapman | 1 | 2 |
| England | Brian Davis | 0 | 3 |
| England | Jamie Spence | 0 | 3 |
| France | Raphaël Jacquelin | 1 | 2 |
| France | Thomas Levet | 0 | 3 |
| France | Jean-François Remésy | 0 | 3 |
| Japan | Isao Aoki | 1 | 2 |
| Japan | Tetsu Nishikawa | 0 | 3 |
| Japan | Tsukasa Watanabe | 0 | 3 |
