= OKI Telepizza Challenge =

Tournament information
- Location: Badajoz, Spain
- Established: 1999
- Course: Golf del Guadiana
- Par: 72
- Tour: Challenge Tour
- Format: Stroke play
- Prize fund: €63,000
- Month played: March
- Final year: 1999

Tournament record score
- Aggregate: 277 David Park (1999)
- To par: −11 as above

Final champion
- (Wales) David Park
- Location in Spain Location in Extremadura

The OKI Telepizza Challenge was a golf tournament on the Challenge Tour, played in Spain. It was held 1999 at Golf del Guadiana in Badajoz.

== Winners ==
Year	Winner	Score	To par	Margin of victory	Runner-up	Ref.
1999	(Wales) David Park	277	−11	1 stroke	(Sweden) Ola Eliasson	
