= Santiago Luna =

Spanish golfer

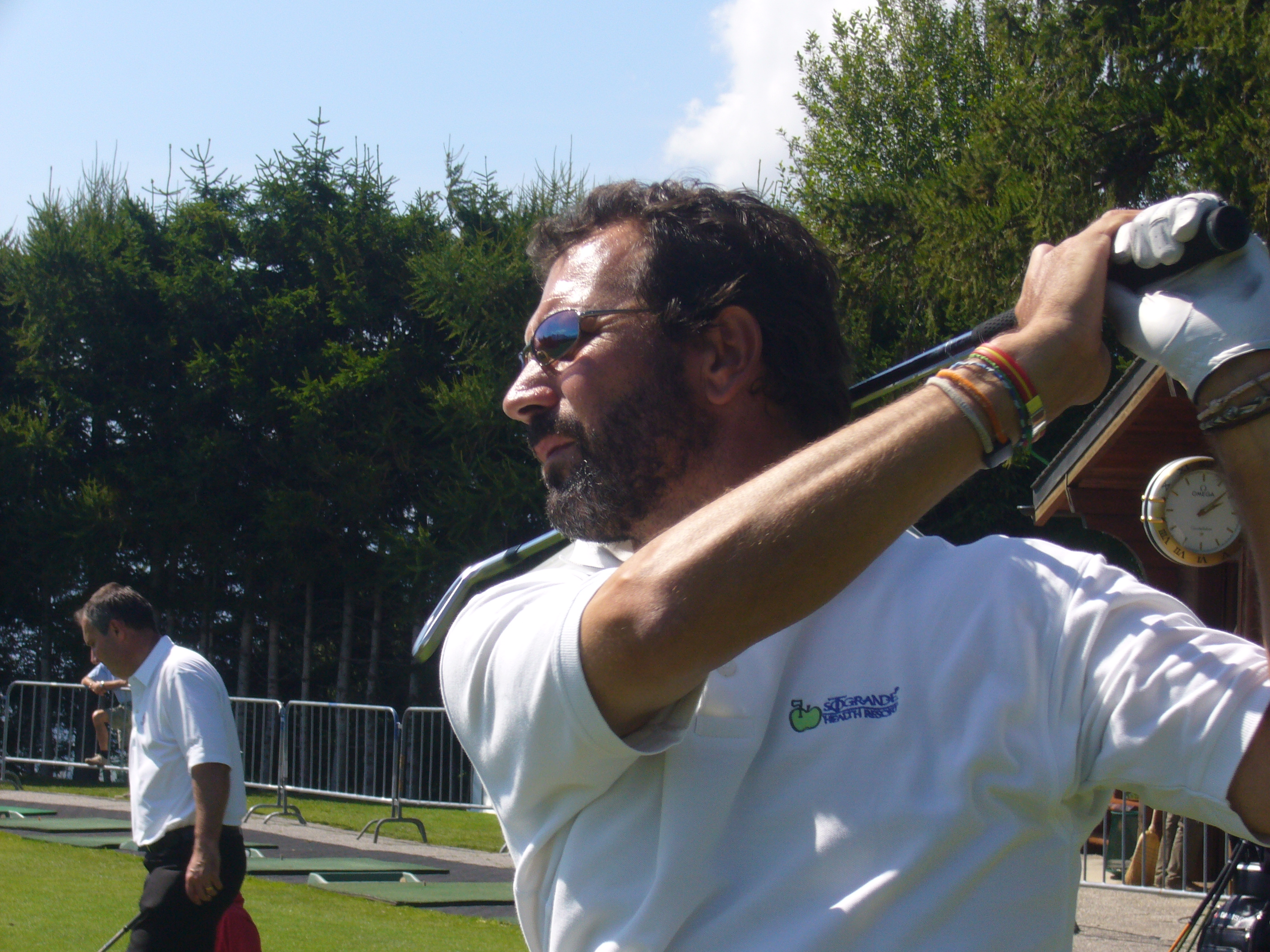

Personal information
- Full name: Santiago Luna Torres
- Nationality: Spain
- Born: 29 November 1962 (age 63) Madrid, Spain
- Height: 1.84 m (6 ft 0 in)
- Weight: 80 kg (176 lb; 12 st 8 lb)

Career
- Sport: Golf
- Turned professional: 1982
- Current tour: European Senior Tour
- Former tour: European Tour
- Professional wins: 16

Number of wins by tour
- European Tour: 1
- European Senior Tour: 4
- Other: 11

Best results in major championships
- Masters Tournament: DNP
- PGA Championship: DNP
- U.S. Open: DNP
- The Open Championship: T35: 1998

Santiago Luna Torres (Note: In this Spanish name, the first or paternal surname is Luna and the second or maternal family name is Torres.) (born 29 November 1962) is a Spanish professional golfer.

== Career ==
Luna's father was on the staff at Puerta de Hierro Golf Club in Madrid.

In 1982, Luna turned professional. He has spent over twenty years on the European Tour, playing in over five hundred tournaments. He ranked in the top one hundred on the Order of Merit twelve times, with a best of 31st place in 1998.

His sole win on the European Tour came in 1995 at the Madeira Island Open, but he has several victories in other professional tournaments. He has represented his country in international competition several times, and in 1999 he helped Spain to the runner-up position at the World Cup.

== Professional wins (16) ==
=== European Tour wins (1) ===
No.	Date	Tournament	Winning score	Margin of victory	Runner-up
1	5 Feb 1995	Madeira Island Open	−16 (67-67-68-70=272)	4 strokes	(France) Christian Cévaër

=== Alps Tour wins (2) ===
No.	Date	Tournament	Winning score	Margin of victory	Runners-up
1	24 Sep 2011	Peugeot Tour de Lerma	−18 (68-64-66=198)	2 strokes	(Spain) Eduardo de la Riva, (Spain) Jorge San Sebastián
2	21 Jul 2012	Peugeot Tour Alps de Madrid	−10 (73-66-64=203)	2 strokes	(Scotland) Ross Kellett, (Northern Ireland) Gareth Shaw

=== Other wins (9) ===
- 1988 Les Bulles Laurent-Perrier (France), Spanish Professional Closed Championship
- 1990 Spanish Professional Closed Championship
- 1992 Spanish Professional Closed Championship
- 1998 King Hassan II Trophy
- 1999 Oki Telepizza - APG (Spain)
- 2000 Spanish Professional Closed Championship
- 2002 King Hassan II Trophy
- 2003 King Hassan II Trophy

=== European Senior Tour wins (4) ===
No.	Date	Tournament	Winning score	Margin of victory	Runner(s)-up
1	18 Aug 2013	SSE Scottish Senior Open	−5 (69-71-71=211)	1 stroke	(Republic of Ireland) Denis O'Sullivan, (Scotland) Sam Torrance
2	8 Jun 2014	ISPS Handa PGA Seniors Championship	−14 (68-71-67-64=270)	2 strokes	(Denmark) Steen Tinning
3	23 Jun 2017	European Tour Properties Senior Classic	−10 (68-67-71=206)	1 stroke	(Switzerland) André Bossert, (Spain) Miguel Ángel Martín
4	7 Oct 2018	Farmfoods European Senior Masters	−10 (67-70-69=206)	2 strokes	(Austria) Markus Brier, (England) Peter T. Wilson

== Playoff record ==
Challenge Tour playoff record (0–1)

No.	Year	Tournament	Opponents	Result
1	2006	Open Mahou de Madrid	(Spain) Luis Claverie, (Spain) Juan Parrón	Parrón won with birdie on third extra hole Claviere eliminated by par on first hole

== Results in major championships ==
Tournament	1991	1992	1993	1994	1995	1996	1997	1998	1999
The Open Championship	T80					CUT		T35	T58

Note: The Open Championship was the only major Luna played.

Did not play

CUT = missed the halfway cut
"T" indicates a tie for a place.

== Team appearances ==
Professional

- Alfred Dunhill Cup (representing Spain): 1991, 1998
- World Cup (representing Spain): 1995, 1998, 1999

== See also ==
- 2005 European Tour Qualifying School graduates
- 2006 European Tour Qualifying School graduates
- 2008 European Tour Qualifying School graduates
