= Paul Broadhurst =

English professional golfer

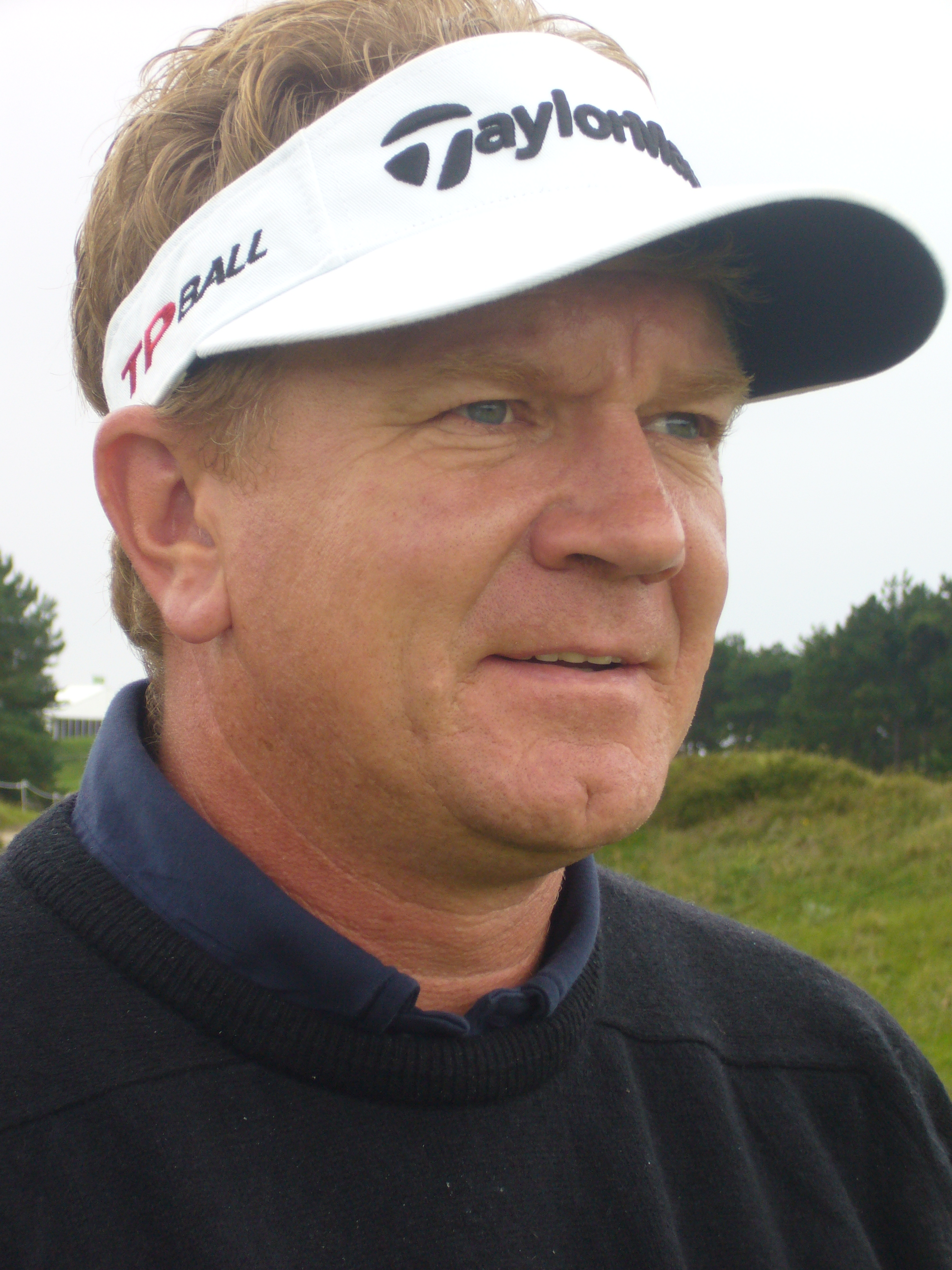
- Broadhurst in 2008

Personal information
- Full name: Paul Andrew Broadhurst
- Nickname: Broady
- Nationality: England
- Born: 14 August 1965 (age 61) Walsall, West Midlands, England
- Height: 1.82 m (6 ft 0 in)
- Weight: 78 kg (172 lb; 12.3 st)

Career
- Sport: Golf
- Turned professional: 1988
- Current tours: European Senior Tour; PGA Tour Champions
- Former tour: European Tour
- Professional wins: 22
- Highest ranking: 46 (2 July 2006)

Number of wins by tour
- European Tour: 6
- PGA Tour Champions: 7
- European Senior Tour: 6
- Other: 5

Best results in major championships
- Masters Tournament: DNP
- PGA Championship: CUT: 1997, 2006, 2018
- U.S. Open: T52: 1997
- The Open Championship: T12: 1990, 2007

Achievements and awards
- Sir Henry Cotton Rookie of the Year: 1989
- European Senior Tour Rookie of the Year: 2015
- PGA Tour Champions Rookie of the Year: 2016
- European Senior Tour Order of Merit winner: 2016, 2018

Paul Andrew Broadhurst (born 14 August 1965) is an English professional golfer. He won six times on the European Tour and played in the 1991 Ryder Cup. A former World Top 50 player, since turning fifty he has had success in senior events, winning the 2016 Senior Open Championship and the 2018 Senior PGA Championship.

== Career ==
Broadhurst was the leading amateur at the 1988 Open Championship. He joined the European Tour in 1989 and picked up his first win at the Credit Lyonnais Cannes Open that year, and was the Sir Henry Cotton Rookie of the Year. Further European Tour wins followed in 1991, 1993 and in 1995, when he won the Open de France (French Open). He played in the Ryder Cup in 1991. His highest finish on the European Tour Order of Merit is ninth in 1996.

Broadhurst suffered a serious injury to his right hand during the second round of the 2000 Dubai Desert Classic, and was unable to compete for the remainder of that season. He also struggled in 2001 and 2002, but improved to 89th in the Order of Merit in 2003, thus regaining full exempt status. In 2005, he picked up his fifth European Tour win, and his first for a decade, at the Portuguese Open and in 2006 he made a successful defence of his title. Broadhurst's run of good form in 2006 enabled him to reach a career-high of 46th in the Official World Golf Rankings. He holds the Open Championship record for the best scoring round (−9) in relation to par, set in 1990 and only equalled by Rory McIlroy in 2010. He played in his 500th European Tour event at the 2008 BMW PGA Championship at Wentworth Golf Club.

After turning 50 in August 2015, Broadhurst had immediate success on the European Senior Tour, winning the Prostate Cancer UK Scottish Senior Open the same month. In 2016 he won the Senior Open Championship and the Nature Valley First Tee Open at Pebble Beach on the PGA Tour Champions. In 2017 he had further wins on the European Senior Tour, winning the Scottish Senior Open for a second time, and the Paris Legends Championship. In 2018 he won the Senior PGA Championship by shooting a bogey-free final round 63, including a 30-foot putt to save par on the 14th hole.

In 2021, Broadhurst won the Staysure PGA Seniors Championship for his sixth victory on the European Senior Tour.

== Personal life ==
Broadhurst's son Sam is also a professional golfer, who played on the PGA EuroPro Tour.

== Amateur wins ==
- 1988 Lytham Trophy

== Professional wins (22) ==
=== European Tour wins (6) ===
No.	Date	Tournament	Winning score	Margin of victory	Runner(s)-up
1	16 Apr 1989	Credit Lyonnais Cannes Open	−9 (65-70-72=207) (Note: Shortened to 36/54 holes due to weather.)	1 stroke	(Northern Ireland) Jimmy Heggarty, (Australia) Brett Ogle, (Australia) Peter Senior
2	11 Aug 1991	European Pro-Celebrity	−16 (67-70-69-66=272)	7 strokes	(Northern Ireland) Ronan Rafferty
3	9 May 1993	Benson & Hedges International Open	−12 (69-69-67-71=276)	1 stroke	(England) Mark James, (Spain) José María Olazábal
4	25 Jun 1995	Peugeot Open de France	−14 (67-75-69-63=274)	8 strokes	(England) Neal Briggs
5	3 Apr 2005	Estoril Open de Portugal	−13 (68-66-70-67=271)	1 stroke	(Scotland) Paul Lawrie
6	2 Apr 2006	Algarve Open de Portugal (2)	−17 (64-69-71-67=271)	1 stroke	(England) Anthony Wall

European Tour playoff record (0–4)

No.	Year	Tournament	Opponent(s)	Result
1	1991	Renault Belgian Open	(Sweden) Per-Ulrik Johansson	Lost to par on first extra hole
2	1991	Volvo German Open	(Zimbabwe) Mark McNulty	Lost to par on first extra hole
3	1993	Honda Open	(Sweden) Johan Ryström, (Scotland) Sam Torrance, (Wales) Ian Woosnam	Torrance won with birdie on first extra hole
4	1996	Volvo Scandinavian Masters	(England) Russell Claydon, (England) Lee Westwood	Westwood won with birdie on second extra hole Broadhurst eliminated by par on first hole

=== Other wins (5) ===
- 1990 Motorola Classic (England)
- 1995 J. P. McManus Pro-Am (shared title with Richard Boxall)
- 2012 Cornish Festival (tie with Simon Lilly)
- 2014 Midland Professional Championship
- 2015 Cornish Festival

=== PGA Tour Champions wins (7) ===
Legend
Senior major championships (2)
Other PGA Tour Champions (5)

No.	Date	Tournament	Winning score	Margin of victory	Runner(s)-up
1	24 Jul 2016	The Senior Open Championship	−11 (75-66-68-68=277)	2 strokes	(United States) Scott McCarron
2	18 Sep 2016	Nature Valley First Tee Open at Pebble Beach	−11 (66-70-68=204)	1 stroke	(Germany) Bernhard Langer, (United States) Kevin Sutherland
3	22 Apr 2018	Bass Pro Shops Legends of Golf (with (United States) Kirk Triplett)	−24 (65-48-33-48=194)	Playoff	(Germany) Bernhard Langer and (United States) Tom Lehman
4	27 May 2018	KitchenAid Senior PGA Championship	−19 (72-66-64-63=265)	4 strokes	(United States) Tim Petrovic
5	16 Sep 2018	The Ally Challenge	−15 (67-68-66=201)	2 strokes	(United States) Brandt Jobe
6	21 Apr 2024	Invited Celebrity Classic	−11 (65-66=131)	1 stroke	(United States) David Toms
7	22 Sep 2024	PURE Insurance Championship (2)	−14 (66-64-72=202)	3 strokes	(Germany) Alex Čejka

PGA Tour Champions playoff record (1–1)

No.	Year	Tournament	Opponent(s)	Result
1	2018	Bass Pro Shops Legends of Golf (with (United States) Kirk Triplett)	(Germany) Bernhard Langer and (United States) Tom Lehman	Won with birdie on first extra hole
2	2020	Charles Schwab Cup Championship	(United States) Kevin Sutherland	Lost to birdie on ninth extra hole

=== European Senior Tour wins (6) ===
Legend
Senior major championships (2)
Other European Senior Tour (4)

No.	Date	Tournament	Winning score	Margin of victory	Runner(s)-up
1	29 Aug 2015	Prostate Cancer UK Scottish Senior Open	−7 (72-69-68=209)	Playoff	(Austria) Gordon Manson
2	24 Jul 2016	The Senior Open Championship	−11 (75-66-68-68=277)	2 strokes	(United States) Scott McCarron
3	6 Aug 2017	Scottish Senior Open	−13 (66-67-67=200)	3 strokes	(Australia) Mike Harwood
4	30 Sep 2017	Paris Legends Championship	−12 (65-70-69=204)	2 strokes	(United States) John Daly
5	27 May 2018	KitchenAid Senior PGA Championship	−19 (72-66-64-63=265)	4 strokes	(United States) Tim Petrovic
6	1 Aug 2021	Staysure PGA Seniors Championship	−7 (72-72-68-69=281)	1 stroke	(England) John Bickerton, (France) Thomas Levet

European Senior Tour playoff record (1–1)

No.	Year	Tournament	Opponent	Result
1	2015	Prostate Cancer UK Scottish Senior Open	(Austria) Gordon Manson	Won with birdie on second extra hole
2	2016	WINSTONgolf Senior Open	(Scotland) Andrew Oldcorn	Lost to par on second extra hole

== Results in major championships ==
Tournament	1988	1989
U.S. Open		
The Open Championship	T57LA	CUT
PGA Championship		

Tournament	1990	1991	1992	1993	1994	1995	1996	1997	1998	1999
U.S. Open								T52		
The Open Championship	T12	T17	CUT	T34	CUT	T58	T27	CUT		
PGA Championship								CUT		

Tournament	2000	2001	2002	2003	2004	2005	2006	2007	2008	2009
U.S. Open										
The Open Championship					T60		T26	T12		T60
PGA Championship							CUT			

Tournament	2010	2011	2012	2013	2014	2015	2016	2017	2018
U.S. Open									
The Open Championship			CUT					CUT	
PGA Championship									CUT

Note: Broadhurst never played in the Masters Tournament.

Did not play

LA = Low amateur
CUT = missed the halfway cut
"T" indicates a tie for a place.

== Results in World Golf Championships ==
Tournament	2006	2007
Match Play	R64	
Championship	T50	T45
Invitational		

Did not play

QF, R16, R32, R64 = Round in which player lost in match play
"T" = Tied

== Senior major championships ==
=== Wins (2) ===
Year	Championship	54 holes	Winning score	Margin	Runner-up
2016	The Senior Open Championship	4 shot deficit	−11 (75-66-68-68=277)	2 strokes	(United States) Scott McCarron
2018	KitchenAid Senior PGA Championship	2 shot deficit	−19 (72-66-64-63=265)	4 strokes	(United States) Tim Petrovic

=== Results timeline ===
Results not in chronological order.

Tournament	2016	2017	2018	2019	2020	2021	2022	2023	2024	2025
The Tradition		T54	T16	T6	NT	T35	T16	T5	T22	T52
Senior PGA Championship	T31	T33	1	3	NT	CUT	T20	T52	CUT	T28
Senior Players Championship		T23	T32	T30	T16	T10	T22	T35	T60	T63
U.S. Senior Open	T37	T12	T5	T11	NT	T28	T7	T23	T31	T55
Senior British Open Championship	1	T15	T32	2	NT	5	T3	T41	3	CUT

Win
Top 10
Did not play

CUT = missed the halfway cut
"T" indicates a tie for a place
NT = no tournament due to COVID-19 pandemic

== Team appearances ==
Amateur

- European Boys' Team Championship (representing England): 1983
- European Amateur Team Championship (representing England): 1987
- St Andrews Trophy (representing Great Britain & Ireland): 1988 (winners)

Professional

- Dunhill Cup (representing England): 1991
- Four Tours World Championship (representing Europe): 1991 (winners)
- Ryder Cup (representing Europe): 1991
- World Cup (representing England): 1995, 1997

== See also ==
- List of golfers with most European Senior Tour wins
