= Paris Legends Championship =

Tournament information
- Location: Paris, France
- Established: 2016
- Course: Racing Club de France La Boulie
- Par: 72
- Length: 6,470 yards (5,920 m)
- Tour: European Senior Tour
- Format: Stroke play
- Prize fund: €200,000
- Month played: October
- Final year: 2019

Tournament record score
- Aggregate: 203 Jean-François Remésy (2019); 203 David Shacklady (2019)
- To par: −13 as above

Final champion
- (England) David Shacklady
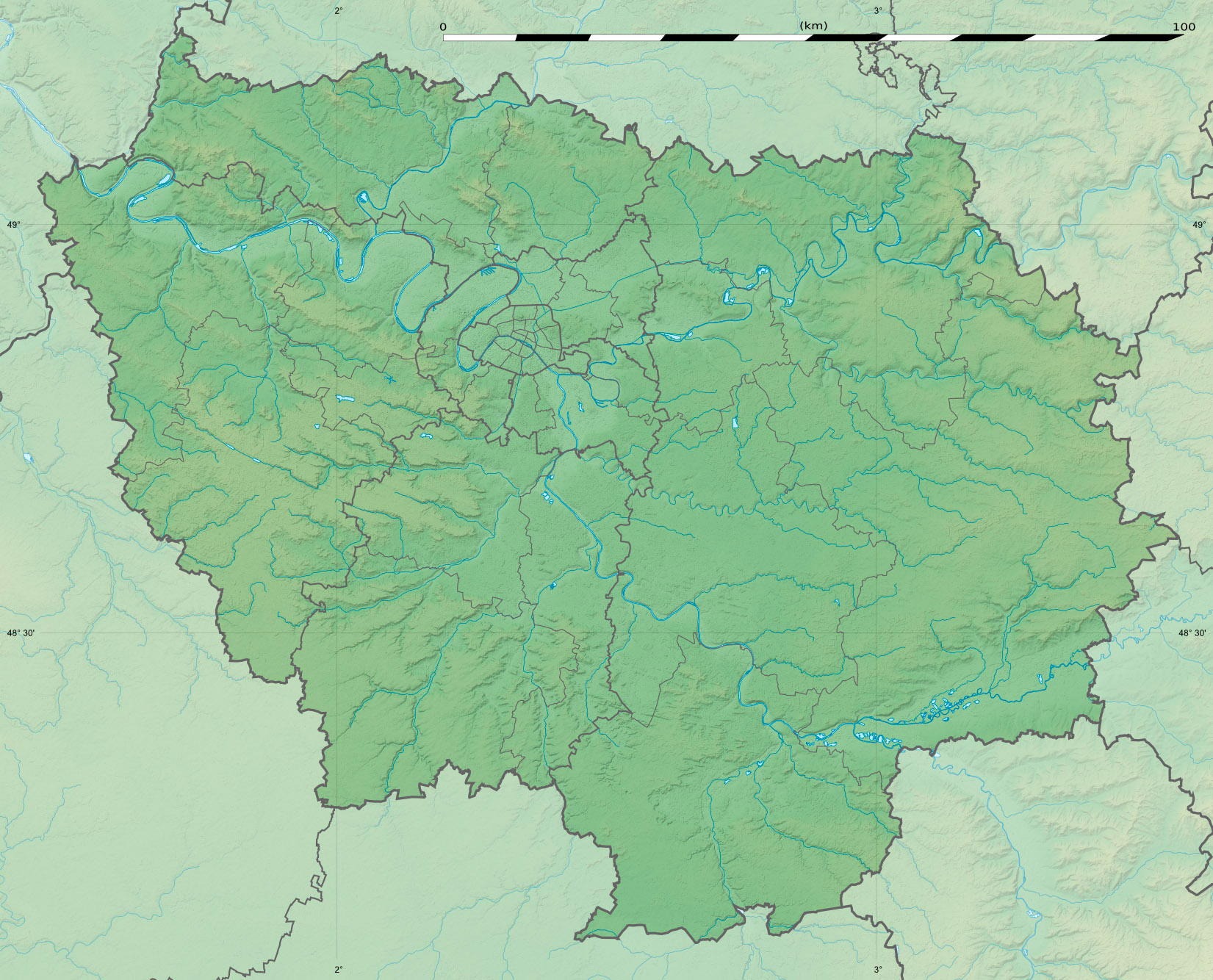
- Location in France Location in Île-de-France

The Paris Legends Championship was a men's senior (over 50) professional golf tournament on the European Senior Tour. It was held for the first time in September 2016 at Le Golf National, Paris, France. The winner was Magnus Persson Atlevi who won the first prize of €52,500 out of total prize-money of €350,000. Paul Broadhurst won the 2017 event, two strokes ahead of John Daly. In 2018 the event moved to Racing Club de France La Boulie and was won by Gary Orr, with total prize money of €300,000.

== Winners ==
Year	Winner	Score	To par	Margin of victory	Runner(s)-up
2019	(England) David Shacklady	203	−13	Playoff	(France) Jean-François Remésy
2018	(Scotland) Gary Orr	204	−12	1 stroke	(Austria) Markus Brier (France) Jean-François Remésy
2017	(England) Paul Broadhurst	204	−12	2 strokes	(United States) John Daly
2016	(Sweden) Magnus Persson Atlevi	205	−8	2 strokes	(Wales) Stephen Dodd (England) Philip Golding (Wales) Mark Mouland
