= 2019 European Senior Tour =

Golf tour season

2019 European Senior Tour season
- Duration: 23 May 2019 – 15 December 2019
- Number of official events: 18
- Most wins: (Argentina) José Cóceres (2) (England) Barry Lane (2) (England) David Shacklady (2)
- Order of Merit: (Wales) Phillip Price
- Rookie of the Year: (Scotland) Paul Lawrie

The 2019 European Senior Tour, titled as the 2019 Staysure Tour for sponsorship reasons, was the 28th season of the European Senior Tour, the main professional golf tour in Europe for men aged 50 and over.

== Schedule ==
The following table lists official events during the 2019 season.

Date	Tournament	Host country	Purse (€)	Winner (Note: The number in brackets after each winner's name is the number of European Senior Tour events they had won up to and including that tournament. This information is only shown for European Senior Tour members.)	Notes
26 May	KitchenAid Senior PGA Championship	United States	US$3,250,000	(United States) Ken Tanigawa (n/a)	Senior major championship
1 Jun	Senior Italian Open	Italy	300,000	(England) Barry Lane (7)	
9 Jun	Arras Open Senior Hauts de France	France	200,000	(England) Peter Baker (1)	New tournament
23 Jun	Farmfoods European Legends Links Championship	England	200,000	(France) Jean-François Remésy (2)	New tournament
30 Jun	U.S. Senior Open	United States	US$4,000,000	(United States) Steve Stricker (n/a)	Senior major championship (Note: Official win; unofficial money.)
7 Jul	Swiss Seniors Open	Switzerland	320,000	(Argentina) José Cóceres (1)	
14 Jul	European Tour Destinations Senior Classic	Spain	250,000	(Spain) José Manuel Carriles (1)	
21 Jul	WINSTONgolf Senior Open	Germany	350,000	(United States) Clark Dennis (5)	
28 Jul	The Senior Open Championship	England	US$2,000,000	(Germany) Bernhard Langer (7)	Senior major championship
4 Aug	Staysure PGA Seniors Championship	England	£400,000	(Wales) Phillip Price (2)	
18 Aug	Scottish Senior Open	Scotland	£250,000	(Scotland) Paul Lawrie (1)	
1 Sep	Sinclair Invitational	England	£400,000	(England) David Shacklady (2)	
22 Sep	Paris Legends Championship	France	200,000	(England) David Shacklady (3)	
29 Sep	Murhof Legends – Austrian Senior Open	Austria	250,000	(Argentina) José Cóceres (2)	New tournament
6 Oct	Farmfoods European Senior Masters	England	200,000	(France) Thomas Levet (1)	
1 Dec	MCB Tour Championship (Madagascar)	Madagascar	275,000	(England) Barry Lane (8)	Tour Championship
7 Dec	MCB Tour Championship (Seychelles)	Seychelles	US$350,000	(Australia) Peter Fowler (7)	Tour Championship
15 Dec	MCB Tour Championship (Mauritius)	Mauritius	400,000	(Sweden) Jarmo Sandelin (1)	Tour Championship

=== Unofficial events ===
The following events were sanctioned by the European Senior Tour, but did not carry official money, nor were wins official.

Date	Tournament	Host country	Purse (€)	Winner	Other tours (Note: CHA – Challenge Tour; LET – Ladies European Tour.)	Notes
6 Apr	Jordan Mixed Open	Jordan	US$393,000	(Netherlands) Daan Huizing	CHA, LET	New mixed event

== Order of Merit ==
The Order of Merit was based on tournament results during the season, calculated using a points-based system.

Position	Player	Points
1	(Wales) Phillip Price	2,888
2	(South Africa) James Kingston	2,526
3	(England) David Shacklady	2,196
4	(France) Jean-François Remésy	2,137
5	(Australia) Peter Fowler	2,132

== Awards ==
Award	Winner	Ref.
Rookie of the Year	(Scotland) Paul Lawrie	
