= David Park (golfer) =

Welsh golfer (born 1974)

Personal information
- Full name: David Park
- Nationality: Wales
- Born: 25 June 1974 (age 52) London, England
- Height: 6 ft 1 in (1.85 m)

Career
- Sport: Golf
- College: Augusta State University
- Turned professional: 1997
- Former tour: European Tour
- Professional wins: 3

Number of wins by tour
- European Tour: 1
- Challenge Tour: 2

Best results in major championships
- Masters Tournament: DNP
- PGA Championship: DNP
- U.S. Open: DNP
- The Open Championship: 79th: 2002

David Park (born 25 June 1974) is a Welsh professional golfer.

== Early life and amateur career ==
Park was born in London to Welsh parents and represents Wales. In 1997, he won the 1997 Brabazon Trophy and was a member of the Great Britain & Ireland Walker Cup team.

== Professional career ==
In 1997, Park turned professional. He made his first start on the European Tour at the 1999 Moroccan Open, and led from the beginning before losing a playoff to Miguel Ángel Martín at the sixth sudden-death hole. His second event was the Compaq European Grand Prix, and he won it. However, he has not lived up to this early promise, and through 2008 he has not bettered his rookie season Order of Merit ranking of 40th.

== Amateur wins ==
- 1997 Brabazon Trophy

== Professional wins (3) ==
=== European Tour wins (1) ===
| No. | Date | Tournament | Winning score | Margin of victory | Runners-up |
|---|---|---|---|---|---|
| 1 | 27 Jun 1999 | Compaq European Grand Prix | −14 (67-65-70-72=274) | 1 stroke | (England) David Carter, (South Africa) Retief Goosen |

European Tour playoff record (0–1)

| No. | Year | Tournament | Opponent | Result |
|---|---|---|---|---|
| 1 | 1999 | Moroccan Open | (Spain) Miguel Ángel Martín | Lost to par on sixth extra hole |

=== Challenge Tour wins (2) ===
| No. | Date | Tournament | Winning score | Margin of victory | Runner-up |
|---|---|---|---|---|---|
| 1 | 19 Jul 1998 | Rolex Trophy | −12 (69-65-74-68=276) | Playoff | (Sweden) Per Nyman |
| 2 | 27 Mar 1999 | OKI Telepizza Challenge | −11 (66-69-72-70=277) | 1 stroke | (Sweden) Ola Eliasson |

Challenge Tour playoff record (1–0)

| No. | Year | Tournament | Opponent | Result |
|---|---|---|---|---|
| 1 | 1998 | Rolex Trophy | (Sweden) Per Nyman | Won with birdie on first extra hole |

== Results in major championships ==
| Tournament | 1999 | 2000 | 2001 | 2002 |
|---|---|---|---|---|
| The Open Championship | CUT | | | 79 |

Note: Park only played in The Open Championship.

Did not play

CUT = missed the half-way cut

== Team appearances ==
Amateur

- Jacques Léglise Trophy (representing Great Britain & Ireland): 1992 (winners)
- European Amateur Team Championship (representing Wales): 1995, 1997
- Walker Cup (representing Great Britain & Ireland): 1997

Professional

- World Cup (representing Wales): 1999
- Alfred Dunhill Cup (representing Wales): 2000
