= Grant Waite =

New Zealand golfer

Personal information
- Full name: Grant Osten Waite
- Nationality: New Zealand
- Born: 11 August 1964 (age 62) Palmerston North, New Zealand
- Height: 6 ft 1 in (1.85 m)
- Weight: 185 lb (84 kg; 13.2 st)

Career
- Sport: Golf
- College: University of Oklahoma
- Turned professional: 1987
- Former tours: PGA Tour; PGA Tour of Australasia; Nationwide Tour; Canadian Tour; Champions Tour
- Professional wins: 4
- Highest ranking: 92 (18 March 2001)

Number of wins by tour
- PGA Tour: 1
- PGA Tour of Australasia: 1
- Other: 2

Best results in major championships
- Masters Tournament: CUT: 1994, 2001
- PGA Championship: T59: 2001
- U.S. Open: T36: 1997
- The Open Championship: DNP

Grant Osten Waite (born 11 August 1964) is a New Zealand professional golfer.

== Early life ==
Waite was born in Palmerston North, New Zealand.

== Professional career ==
Waite has one PGA Tour victory, the Kemper Open in 1993, and finished second to Tiger Woods at the 2000 Bell Canadian Open.

Waite won the New Zealand Open and the Trafalgar Capital Classic in 1992, and the Utah Open in 1993. In 1996, Waite shot a final round 60 in the Phoenix Open.

Waite qualified for the 2015 Champions Tour by finishing second at qualifying school in 2014.

== Professional wins (4) ==
=== PGA Tour wins (1) ===
No.	Date	Tournament	Winning score	Margin of victory	Runner-up
1	23 May 1993	Kemper Open	−9 (66-67-72-70=275)	1 stroke	(United States) Tom Kite

PGA Tour playoff record (0–1)

No.	Year	Tournament	Opponents	Result
1	1997	Michelob Championship at Kingsmill	(United States) David Duval, (United States) Duffy Waldorf	Duval won with birdie on first extra hole

=== PGA Tour of Australasia wins (1) ===
No.	Date	Tournament	Winning score	Margin of victory	Runners-up
1	23 Feb 1992	AMP New Zealand Open	−16 (70-63-66-69=268)	2 strokes	(Australia) Peter Fowler, (Australia) Grant Kenny

PGA Tour of Australasia playoff record (0–1)

No.	Year	Tournament	Opponents	Result
1	1993	Ford Australian PGA Championship	(Australia) Ian Baker-Finch, (Australia) Peter Fowler	Baker-Finch won with birdie on second extra hole

=== Canadian Tour wins (1) ===
No.	Date	Tournament	Winning score	Margin of victory	Runner-up
1	9 Aug 1992	Trafalgar Capital Classic	−13 (71-68-68-68=275)	1 stroke	(United States) Michael Bradley

=== Other wins (1) ===
- 1992 Utah Open

== Results in major championships ==
Tournament	1993	1994	1995	1996	1997	1998	1999	2000	2001	2002	2003
Masters Tournament		CUT							CUT		
U.S. Open	T72			DQ	T36	CUT					CUT
PGA Championship	CUT		CUT	CUT		CUT			T59		

Note: Waite never played in The Open Championship.

Did not play

CUT = missed the half-way cut
DQ = Disqualified
"T" = tied

== Team appearances ==
- Alfred Dunhill Cup (representing New Zealand): 1989, 1992, 1994, 1996, 2000
- World Cup (representing New Zealand): 1997

== See also ==
- 1989 PGA Tour Qualifying School graduates
- 1992 PGA Tour Qualifying School graduates
- 2003 PGA Tour Qualifying School graduates
