= 2018 European Senior Tour =

Golf tour season

2018 European Senior Tour season
- Duration: 8 March 2018 – 16 December 2018
- Number of official events: 19
- Most wins: (United States) Clark Dennis (2) (Scotland) Gary Orr (2) (England) Paul Streeter (2)
- Order of Merit: (England) Paul Broadhurst
- Rookie of the Year: (England) Paul Streeter

The 2018 European Senior Tour, titled as the 2018 Staysure Tour for sponsorship reasons, was the 27th season of the European Senior Tour, the main professional golf tour in Europe for men aged 50 and over.

== Staysure title sponsorship ==
In December 2017, it was announced that the tour had signed a title sponsorship agreement with insurance company Staysure, being renamed as the Staysure Tour.

== Schedule ==
The following table lists official events during the 2018 season.

Date	Tournament	Host country	Purse (€)	Winner (Note: The number in brackets after each winner's name is the number of European Senior Tour events they had won up to and including that tournament. This information is only shown for European Senior Tour members.)	Notes
10 Mar	Sharjah Senior Golf Masters	UAE	US$425,000	(Thailand) Thaworn Wiratchant (2)	
27 May	KitchenAid Senior PGA Championship	United States	US$3,250,000	(England) Paul Broadhurst (5)	Senior major championship
3 Jun	Shipco Masters	Denmark	350,000	(Scotland) Colin Montgomerie (9)	New tournament
17 Jun	Senior Italian Open	Italy	300,000	(United States) Clark Dennis (3)	
1 Jul	U.S. Senior Open	United States	US$4,000,000	(United States) David Toms (n/a)	Senior major championship (Note: Official win; unofficial money.)
8 Jul	Swiss Seniors Open	Switzerland	320,000	(France) Jean-François Remésy (1)	
15 Jul	WINSTONgolf Senior Open	Germany	350,000	(Wales) Stephen Dodd (3)	
29 Jul	The Senior Open Championship	Scotland	US$2,000,000	(Spain) Miguel Ángel Jiménez (1)	Senior major championship
5 Aug	Staysure PGA Seniors Championship	England	£400,000	(England) Philip Golding (5)	
19 Aug	VTB Russian Open Golf Championship	Russia	US$500,000	(England) David Shacklady (1)	
26 Aug	Willow Senior Golf Classic	England	£370,000	(Australia) Peter Fowler (6)	
2 Sep	Travis Perkins Masters	England	£380,000	(England) Paul Streeter (1)	
9 Sep	European Tour Properties Senior Classic	Bulgaria	250,000	(Sweden) Magnus Persson Atlevi (2)	
16 Sep	Scottish Senior Open	Scotland	£250,000	(Scotland) Gary Orr (1)	
7 Oct	Farmfoods European Senior Masters	England	200,000	(Spain) Santiago Luna (4)	
13 Oct	Paris Legends Championship	France	300,000	(Scotland) Gary Orr (2)	
1 Dec	Costa Blanca Benidorm Senior Golf Masters	Spain	300,000	(England) Paul Streeter (2)	New tournament
9 Dec	MCB Tour Championship (Mauritius)	Mauritius	450,000	(United States) Clark Dennis (4)	Tour Championship
16 Dec	MCB Tour Championship (Seychelles)	Seychelles	US$300,000	(England) Roger Chapman (3)	Tour Championship

== Order of Merit ==
The Order of Merit was based on prize money won during the season, calculated in Euros.

Position	Player	Prize money (€)
1	(England) Paul Broadhurst	547,793
2	(Wales) Phillip Price	279,627
3	(Wales) Stephen Dodd	267,241
4	(United States) Clark Dennis	259,240
5	(Sweden) Magnus Persson Atlevi	221,819

== Awards ==
Award	Winner	Ref.
Rookie of the Year	(England) Paul Streeter	
