= Sharjah Senior Golf Masters =

Tournament information
- Location: Sharjah, United Arab Emirates
- Established: 2017
- Courses: Sharjah Golf and Shooting Club
- Par: 72
- Length: 7,001 yards (6,402 m)
- Tour: European Senior Tour
- Format: Stroke play
- Prize fund: US$425,000
- Month played: March
- Final year: 2018

Tournament record score
- Aggregate: 203 Gary Marks (2017); 203 Chris Williams (2017)
- To par: −13 as above

Final champion
- (Thailand) Thaworn Wiratchant
- Location in the United Arab Emirates

The Sharjah Senior Golf Masters was a men's senior (over 50) professional golf tournament on the European Senior Tour. It was held for the first time in March 2017 at Sharjah Golf and Shooting Club, Sharjah, United Arab Emirates. Total prize money was €425,000. It was the first European Senior Tour event held in the United Arab Emirates since the Abu Dhabi European Seniors Tour Championship in 2000.

The Sharjah Golf and Shooting Club only has a nine-hole course and the tournament was the first European Tour, European Challenge Tour or European Senior Tour event to be played on a nine-hole course. In 2017, the par-3 and par-5 holes (holes 3, 4, 6 and 8) were played from different tees when played the second time. In 2018, all holes, except the first, used two different tees. In addition two pin positions were used on each green on the final day.

== Winners ==
| Year | Winner | Score | To par | Margin of victory | Runner(s)-up |
|---|---|---|---|---|---|
| 2018 | (Thailand) Thaworn Wiratchant | 204 | −12 | Playoff | (United States) Clark Dennis (Australia) Peter Fowler |
| 2017 | (South Africa) Chris Williams | 203 | −13 | Playoff | (England) Gary Marks |
