= 1999 World Cup of Golf =

Tournament information
- Dates: 18–21 November
- Location: Kuala Lumpur, Malaysia
- Course(s): Mines Resort and Golf Club
- Format: 72 holes stroke play combined score

Statistics
- Par: 71
- Length: 6,807 yards (6,224 m)
- Field: 32 two-man teams
- Cut: None
- Prize fund: US$1,300,000 team US$200,000 individual
- Winner's share: US$400,000 team US$100,000 individual

Champion
- United States; Mark O'Meara & Tiger Woods
- 545 (−23)

The 1999 World Cup of Golf took place 18–21 November at the Mines Resort and Golf Club in Kuala Lumpur, Malaysia. It was the 45th World Cup. The tournament was a 72-hole stroke play team event (32 teams) with each team consisting of two players from a country. The combined score of each team determined the team results. Individuals also competed for the International Trophy. The prize money totaled $1,500,000 with $400,000 going to the winning pair and $100,000 to the top individual. The American team of Mark O'Meara and Tiger Woods won by five strokes over the Spanish team of Santiago Luna and Miguel Ángel Martín. Woods also took the International Trophy with the best total individual score in tournament history and by a tournament record margin of nine strokes over Frank Nobilo of New Zealand.

== Teams ==
Country	Players
Argentina	Ángel Cabrera and Eduardo Romero
Australia	Paul Gow and Terry Price
Canada	Arden Knoll and Ray Stewart
Chile	Guillermo Encina and Roy Mackenzie
Colombia	Jesús Amaya and Gustavo Mendoza
Denmark	Anders Hansen and Søren Kjeldsen
England	Peter Baker and Mark James
Finland	Mika Lehtinen and Kim Wiik
France	Marc Farry and Jean-François Remésy
Germany	Sven Strüver and Heinz-Peter Thül
Ireland	Pádraig Harrington and Paul McGinley
Italy	Emanuele Canonica and Costantino Rocca
Jamaica	Ralph Campbell and Peter Horrobin
Japan	Mitsuo Harada and Mamo Osanai
Malaysia	Periasamy Gunasegaran and Marimuthu Ramayah
Mexico	Rafael Alarcón and Jose Octavio Gonzalez
Myanmar	Kyi Hla Han and Soe Kyaw Naing
Netherlands	Maarten Lafeber and Joost Steenkamer
New Zealand	Frank Nobilo and Stephen Scahill
Paraguay	Raúl Fretes and Pedro Martínez
Philippines	Felix Casas and Mars Pucay
Puerto Rico	Rafael Castrillo and Wilfredo Morales
Scotland	Colin Montgomerie and Dean Robertson
South Africa	David Frost and Richard Kaplan
South Korea	Kang Wook-soon and Kim Wan-tae
Spain	Santiago Luna and Miguel Ángel Martín
Sweden	Jarmo Sandelin and Patrik Sjöland
Switzerland	Carlos Duran and Steve Ray
Taiwan	Chen Liang-hsi and Tsai Chi-huang
United States	Mark O'Meara and Tiger Woods
Wales	David Park and Phillip Price
Zimbabwe	Tony Johnstone and Mark McNulty

== Scores ==
Team

Place	Country	Score	To par	Money (US$) (per team)
1	United States	140-133-130-142=545	−23	400,000
2	Spain	140-132-138-140=550	−18	200,000
3	Ireland	141-139-139-135=554	−14	125,000
4	Argentina	141-137-138-139=555	−13	100,000
5	Sweden	146-131-140-139=556	−12	80,000
6	England	142-137-141-138=558	−10	60,000
T7	Japan	135-149-141-137=562	−6	38,500
T7	Zimbabwe	141-143-139-139=562	−6	38,500
9	Wales	139-139-143-142=563	−5	28,000
10	New Zealand	146-138-144-136=564	−4	24,000
11	South Africa	145-140-138-143=566	−2	20,000
12	South Korea	150-139-142-136=567	−1	17,000
T13	Denmark	141-148-142-137=568	E	14,000
T13	Mexico	144-144-139-141=568	E	14,000
15	Scotland	145-142-140-144=571	+3	11,000
16	Australia	147-146-141-139=573	+5	10,000
17	Myanmar	149-141-142-142=574	+6	9,000
18	Philippines	144-146-146-139=575	+7	8,800
T19	Colombia	147-146-148-135=576	+8	8,500
T19	Netherlands	155-143-138-140=576	+8	8,500
21	France	147-146-146-143=582	+14	8,200
22	Canada	148-146-140-149=583	+15	8,000
23	Paraguay	148-150-145-141=584	+16	7,800
T24	Germany	143-151-146-145=585	+17	7,500
T24	Switzerland	149-144-145-147=585	+17	7,500
T26	Italy	150-146-147-143=586	+18	7,100
T26	Malaysia	146-151-147-142=586	+18	7,100
28	Finland	146-150-153-143=592	+24	6,800
29	Puerto Rico	148-150-143-152=593	+25	6,600
30	Taiwan	155-142-141-156=594	+26	6,400
31	Chile	156-143-146-150=595	+27	6,200
32	Jamaica	148-155-156-156=615	+47	6,000

International Trophy

Place	Player	Country	Score	To par	Money (US$)
1	Tiger Woods	United States	67-68-63-65=263	−21	100,000
2	Frank Nobilo	New Zealand	69-68-68-67=272	−12	50,000
T3	Ángel Cabrera	Argentina	69-69-68-67=273	−11	16,667
T3	Miguel Ángel Martín	Spain	69-66-70-68=273	−11	16,667
T3	Mamo Osanai	Japan	65-76-67-65=273	−11	16,667
6	Kang Wook-soon	South Korea	69-70-68-68=275	−9	
T7	Pádraig Harrington	Ireland	71-68-70-67=276	−8	
T7	Tony Johnstone	Zimbabwe	68-70-68-70=276	−8	
T7	Phillip Price	Wales	68-67-68-73=276	−8	
T10	David Frost	South Africa	71-69-68-69=277	−7	
T10	Mark James	England	71-67-71-68=277	−7	
T10	Santiago Luna	Spain	71-66-68-72=277	−7	
T10	Patrik Sjöland	Sweden	72-66-69-70=277	−7	
