= Andrew Oldcorn =

Scottish professional golfer

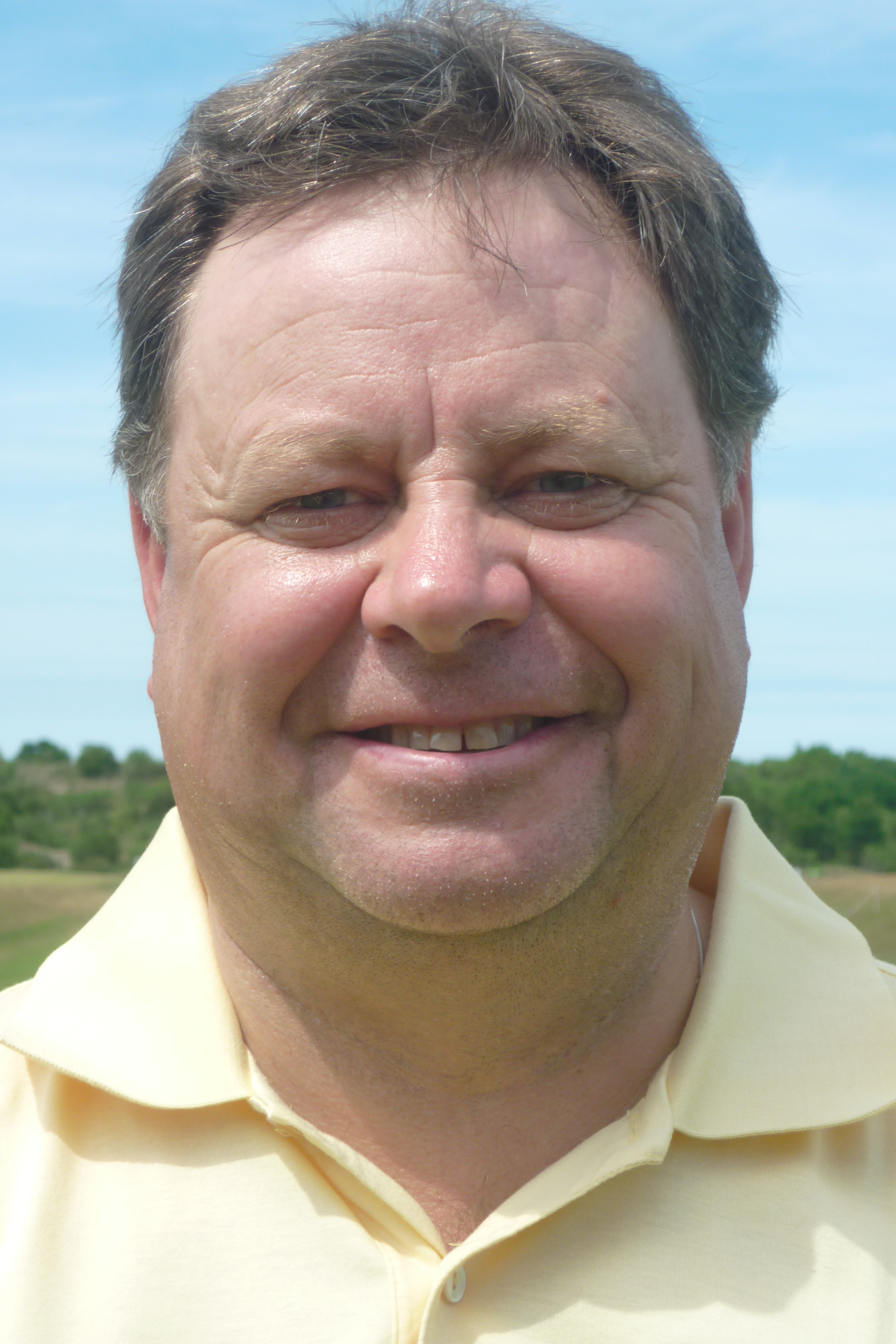

Personal information
- Full name: Andrew Steven Oldcorn
- Nickname: Bagpuss
- Nationality: Scotland
- Born: 31 March 1960 (age 66) Bolton, England
- Height: 5 ft 10 in (1.78 m)
- Weight: 196 lb (89 kg; 14.0 st)
- Spouse: Kirstin (m. 1999)
- Children: 3

Career
- Sport: Golf
- Turned professional: 1983
- Current tours: European Senior Tour; Champions Tour
- Former tour: European Tour
- Professional wins: 6
- Highest ranking: 72 (28 October 2001)

Number of wins by tour
- European Tour: 3
- European Senior Tour: 2

Best results in major championships
- Masters Tournament: DNP
- PGA Championship: T44: 2001
- U.S. Open: DNP
- The Open Championship: T28: 2003

Andrew Oldcorn (born 31 March 1960) is a Scottish professional golfer.

== Early life and amateur career ==
In 1960, Oldcorn was born in Bolton, Lancashire, England. However, his family moved to Formby in 1964, and then to Edinburgh, Scotland, in 1968, where he attended Currie High School. He therefore represents Scotland in golf.

He represented England as an amateur and won the English Amateur in 1982. He also represented Great Britain & Ireland at the 1983 Walker Cup.

== Professional career ==
In 1983, Oldcorn turned professional. Oldcorn was medalist at the European Tour Qualifying School that year. He had a steady start to his career on tour before being struck down with ME (also known as Chronic Fatigue Syndrome) in the early 1990s. He returned to form in 1993, to claim his first tour victory in the Turespana Masters Open de Andalucia. Away from the tour he also won the Sunderland of Scotland Masters. Several solid years followed along with another title, the 1995 DHL Jersey Open. The undoubted highlight of his career came in 2001 when he became the oldest winner in the history of the Volvo PGA Championship (although Miguel Ángel Jiménez would later beat that record). He finished that season a career best 26th place on the European Tour Order of Merit.

Since turning 50, Oldcorn has primarily been playing on the senior golf tours, having won twice on the European Senior Tour.

== Amateur wins ==
- 1979 Scottish Youths Amateur Championship
- 1982 English Amateur

== Professional wins (6) ==
=== European Tour wins (3) ===
Legend
Flagship events (1)
Other European Tour (2)

No.	Date	Tournament	Winning score	Margin of victory	Runner-up
1	28 Feb 1993	Turespaña Masters Open de Andalucía	−3 (70-71-73-71=285)	1 stroke	(Argentina) Eduardo Romero
2	18 Jun 1995	DHL Jersey Open	−15 (70-68-66-69=273)	3 strokes	(Scotland) Dean Robertson
3	28 May 2001	Volvo PGA Championship	−16 (66-66-69-71=272)	2 strokes	(Argentina) Ángel Cabrera

=== Other wins (1) ===
- 1993 Sunderland of Scotland Masters

=== European Senior Tour wins (2) ===
No.	Date	Tournament	Winning score	Margin of victory	Runner-up
1	12 Jun 2011	De Vere Club PGA Seniors Championship	−11 (73-66-68-70=277)	9 strokes	(Scotland) Gordon Brand Jnr
2	10 Jul 2016	WINSTONgolf Senior Open	−8 (70-69-69=208)	Playoff	(England) Paul Broadhurst

European Senior Tour playoff record (1–0)

No.	Year	Tournament	Opponent	Result
1	2016	WINSTONgolf Senior Open	(England) Paul Broadhurst	Won with par on second extra hole

== Results in major championships ==
Tournament	1982	1983	1984	1985	1986	1987	1988	1989
The Open Championship	CUT		CUT		CUT	CUT		
PGA Championship								

Tournament	1990	1991	1992	1993	1994	1995	1996	1997	1998	1999
The Open Championship	CUT	T64			CUT	WD	CUT		80	
PGA Championship										

Tournament	2000	2001	2002	2003	2004	2005
The Open Championship	CUT	CUT	CUT	T28	T42	CUT
PGA Championship		T44				

Note: Oldcorn never played in the Masters Tournament nor the U.S. Open.

Did not play

CUT = missed the half-way cut
WD = Withdrew
"T" = tied

== Team appearances ==
Amateur

- Eisenhower Trophy (representing Great Britain & Ireland): 1982
- St Andrews Trophy (representing Great Britain & Ireland): 1982
- Walker Cup (representing Great Britain & Ireland): 1983
- European Amateur Team Championship (representing England): 1983

Professional

- Seve Trophy: 2002 (winners)
