= Gary Orr =

Scottish golfer

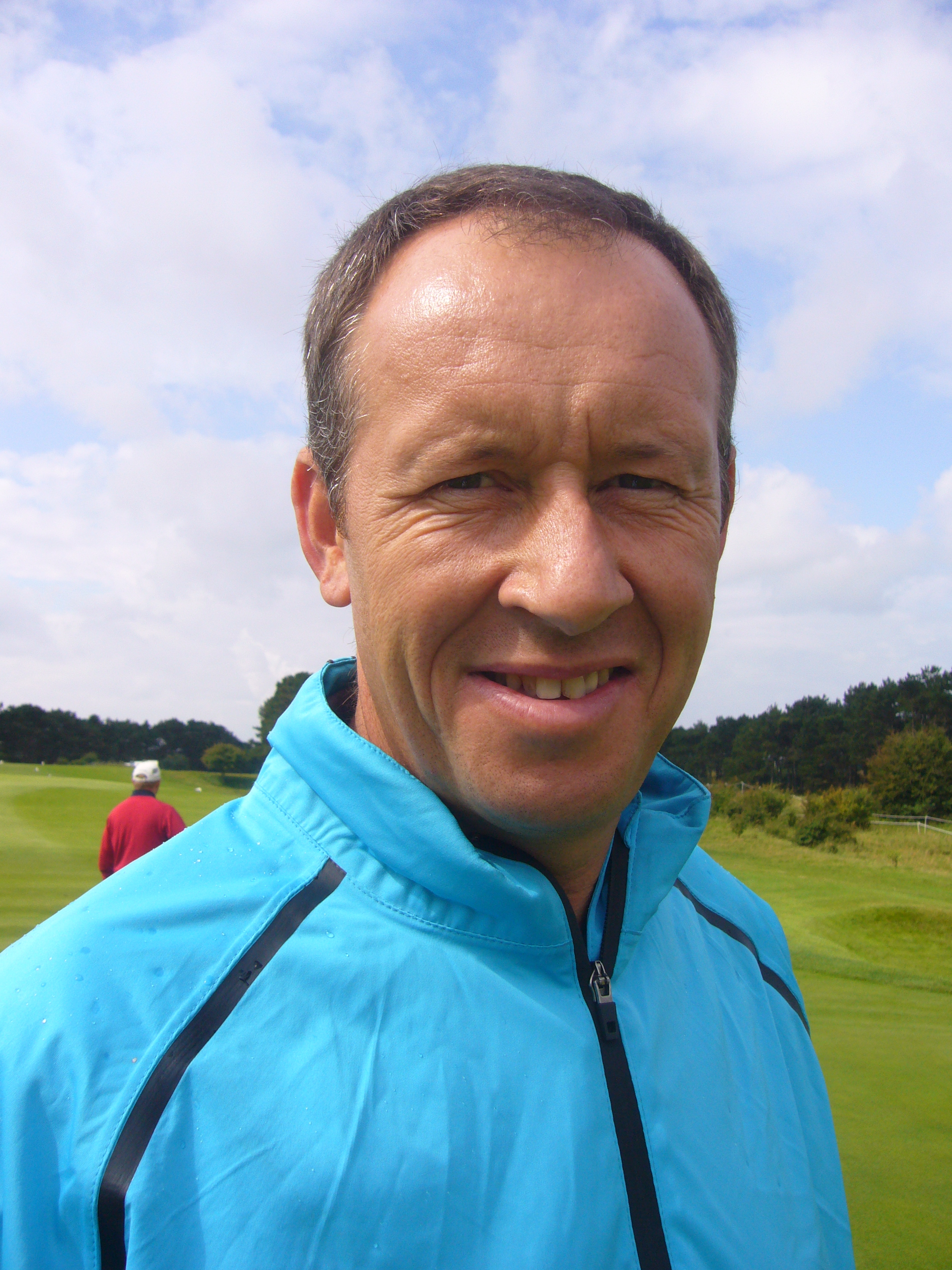

Personal information
- Full name: Gary Hamish Orr
- Nationality: Scotland
- Born: 11 May 1967 (age 59) Helensburgh, Scotland
- Height: 6 ft 2 in (1.88 m)
- Weight: 196 lb (89 kg; 14.0 st)
- Spouse: Sarah (m. 1998)
- Children: 2

Career
- Sport: Golf
- Turned professional: 1988
- Current tour: European Senior Tour
- Former tour: European Tour
- Professional wins: 5
- Highest ranking: 53 (22 October 2000)

Number of wins by tour
- European Tour: 2
- European Senior Tour: 2
- Other: 1

Best results in major championships
- Masters Tournament: DNP
- PGA Championship: CUT: 2000, 2001
- U.S. Open: T74: 2001
- The Open Championship: T41: 2000

Achievements and awards
- Sir Henry Cotton Rookie of the Year: 1993

Gary Hamish Orr (born 11 May 1967) is a Scottish professional golfer.

== Career ==
Orr was born in Helensburgh, Scotland. He turned professional in 1988 and became a member of the European Tour in 1993. His two wins on the Tour both came in 2000, at the Algarve Portuguese Open and the Victor Chandler British Masters. He also had his highest finish on the European Tour Order of Merit that season, placing tenth.

Since turning 50 in May 2017, Orr has played on the European Senior Tour. He was runner-up in the Willow Senior Golf Classic in both 2017 and 2018 before his first win on the tour in the 2018 Scottish Senior Open.

== Professional wins (5) ==
=== European Tour wins (2) ===
No.	Date	Tournament	Winning score	Margin of victory	Runner-up
1	20 Feb 2000	Algarve Portuguese Open	−13 (69-67-70-69=275)	1 stroke	(Wales) Phillip Price
2	13 Aug 2000	Victor Chandler British Masters	−21 (67-62-68-70=267)	2 strokes	(Sweden) Per-Ulrik Johansson

=== Other wins (1) ===
- 1991 Sunderland of Scotland Masters

=== European Senior Tour wins (2) ===
No.	Date	Tournament	Winning score	Margin of victory	Runner(s)-up
1	16 Sep 2018	Scottish Senior Open	−4 (68-65-76=209)	1 stroke	(England) Paul Streeter
2	13 Oct 2018	Paris Legends Championship	−12 (71-65-68=204)	1 stroke	(Austria) Markus Brier, (France) Jean-François Remésy

== Results in major championships ==
Tournament	1993	1994	1995	1996	1997	1998	1999
U.S. Open							
The Open Championship	CUT	CUT			CUT	CUT	
PGA Championship							

Tournament	2000	2001	2002	2003	2004	2005	2006	2007	2008	2009
U.S. Open		T74								
The Open Championship	T41	CUT								CUT
PGA Championship	CUT	CUT								

Note: Orr never played in the Masters Tournament.

Did not play

CUT = missed the half-way cut
"T" = tied

== Results in World Golf Championships ==
Tournament	2000	2001
Match Play		R32
Championship	T25	NT^{1}
Invitational	T27	

^{1}Cancelled due to 9/11

Did not play

QF, R16, R32, R64 = Round in which player lost in match play
"T" = Tied
NT = No tournament

== Team appearances ==
Amateur

- European Boys' Team Championship (representing Scotland): 1985

Professional

- Alfred Dunhill Cup (representing Scotland): 1998, 1999, 2000
- Seve Trophy (representing Great Britain & Ireland): 2000
- World Cup (representing Scotland): 2000

== See also ==
- 2011 European Tour Qualifying School graduates
- 2012 European Tour Qualifying School graduates
