= Jean-François Remésy =

French professional golfer (born 1964)

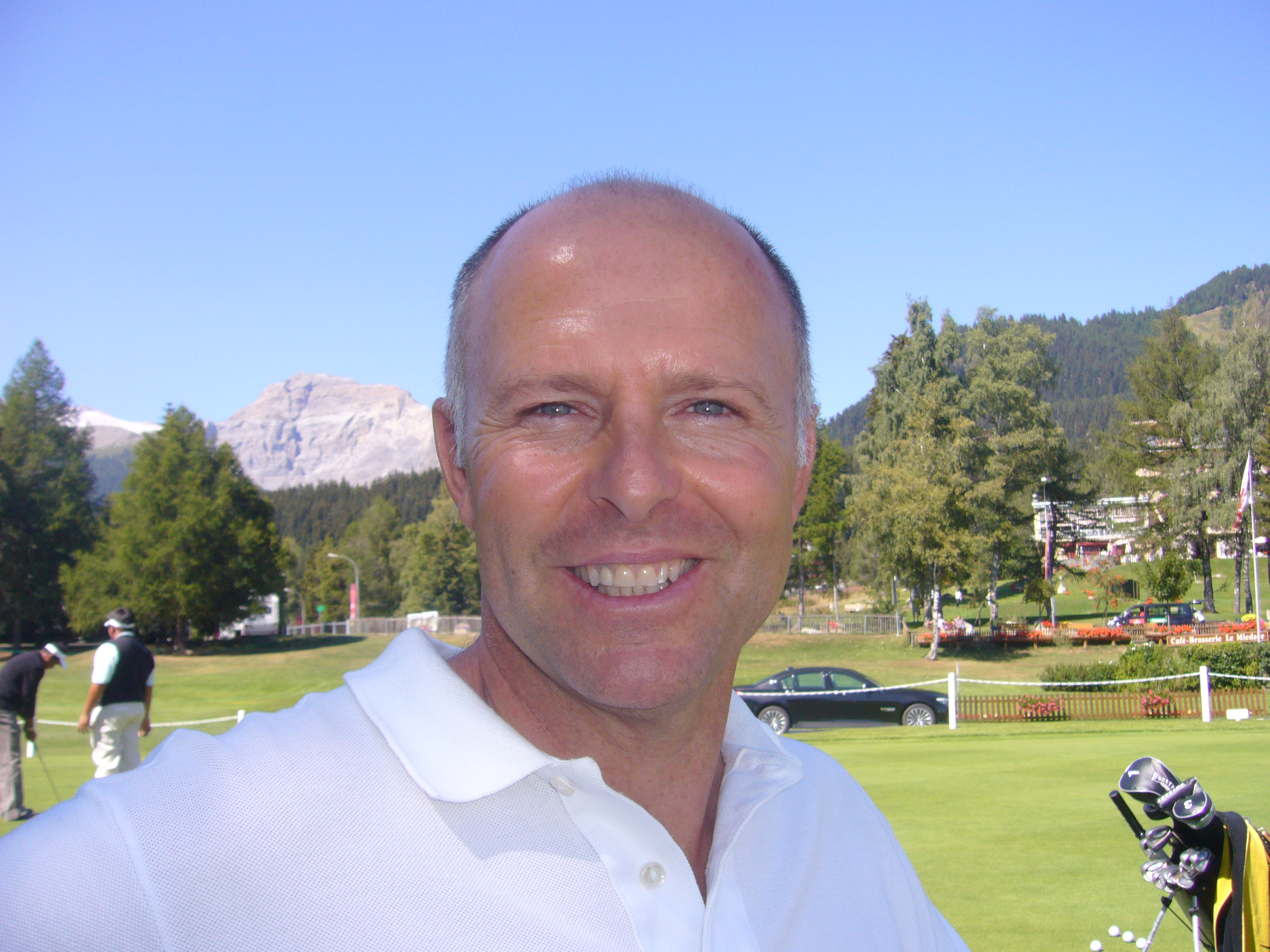

Personal information
- Nickname: Jeff
- Nationality: France
- Born: 5 June 1964 (age 62) Nîmes, France
- Height: 5 ft 8 in (1.73 m)
- Weight: 146 lb (66 kg; 10.4 st)

Career
- Sport: Golf
- Turned professional: 1987
- Current tour: European Senior Tour
- Former tours: European Tour; Challenge Tour; PGA Tour Champions
- Professional wins: 13
- Highest ranking: 97 (26 June 2005)

Number of wins by tour
- European Tour: 3
- Challenge Tour: 1
- European Senior Tour: 2
- Other: 7

Best results in major championships
- Masters Tournament: DNP
- PGA Championship: T17: 2004
- U.S. Open: DNP
- The Open Championship: CUT: 1997, 1998, 2000, 2002, 2004, 2005

Jean-François Remésy (born 5 June 1964), also known as Jeff Remésy, is a French professional golfer.

== Career ==
Remésy was born in Nîmes, Occitania. He won the French Amateur Championship in 1985 and turned professional in 1987. For much of his career he has struggled to establish himself as a tour golfer, and he has made over a dozen trips to the European Tour Qualifying School. His first professional win came in a small tournament in France in 1991 and he won on the Challenge Tour in 1994, but he didn't break into the top 100 on the European Tour Order of Merit until 1999. That year he won the Estoril Open on the main tour, and he has continued to progress since then. In 2004 he became the first Frenchman to win the Open de France in 35 years, and in 2005 he retained his title by beating fellow Frenchman Jean van de Velde in a playoff. He lost his card in 2008 after a poor season and went to qualifying school for the 13th time but was not able to earn his tour card for 2009. His best finish on the European Tour Order of Merit came in 2004 when he finished in 19th with €1,083,360.

Since turning 50, Remésy has played senior golf on the European Senior Tour and the PGA Tour Champions. On the PGA Tour Champions his best result was to be tied for 4th place in the 2016 American Family Insurance Championship. In 2018 he won the Swiss Seniors Open, his first win on the European Senior Tour.

== Amateur wins ==
- 1985 French Native Amateur Championship

== Professional wins (13) ==
=== European Tour wins (3) ===
No.	Date	Tournament	Winning score	Margin of victory	Runner(s)-up
1	18 Apr 1999	Estoril Open	−2 (72-69-77-68=286)	2 strokes	(England) David Carter, (Scotland) Andrew Coltart, (Italy) Massimo Florioli
2	27 Jun 2004	Open de France	−12 (69-67-65-71=272)	7 strokes	(Australia) Richard Green, (Australia) Nick O'Hern
3	26 Jun 2005	Open de France (2)	−11 (68-69-67-69=273)	Playoff	(France) Jean van de Velde

European Tour playoff record (1–1)

No.	Year	Tournament	Opponent	Result
1	2005	Open de France	(France) Jean van de Velde	Won with double-bogey on first extra hole
2	2007	BA-CA Golf Open	(Australia) Richard Green	Lost to par on first extra hole

=== Challenge Tour wins (1) ===
No.	Date	Tournament	Winning score	Margin of victory	Runners-up
1	11 Sep 1994	Dutch Challenge Open	−14 (70-67-68-69=274)	3 strokes	(England) John Bickerton, (Sweden) Dennis Edlund, (France) Antoine Lebouc

=== Alps Tour wins (3) ===
No.	Date	Tournament	Winning score	Margin of victory	Runner(s)-up
1	19 Oct 2003	Masters 13	−21 (69-66-67-65=267)	2 strokes	(France) Raphaël Jacquelin
2	22 Oct 2006	Masters 13 (2)	−10 (73-68-67-70=278)	Playoff	(France) Bertrand Cornut
3	14 Sep 2008	Open International Stade Français Paris	−16 (64-72-66-70=272)	5 strokes	(France) Julien Guerrier, (France) Mike Lorenzo-Vera

=== French Tour wins (1) ===
No.	Date	Tournament	Winning score	Margin of victory	Runners-up
1	26 Jul 2009	Peugeot Classic Omnium International	−9 (69-73-65=207)	1 stroke	(France) Émilien Chamaulte, (France) Jean-Marie Gougeon

=== Other wins (3) ===
- 1991 Challenge AGF (France)
- 1994 Vittel Open (France)
- 1999 French PGA Championship

=== European Senior Tour wins (2) ===
No.	Date	Tournament	Winning score	Margin of victory	Runner(s)-up
1	8 Jul 2018	Swiss Seniors Open	−11 (67-63-69=199)	1 stroke	(Spain) Miguel Ángel Martín, (Wales) Phillip Price, (Sweden) Jarmo Sandelin
2	23 Jun 2019	Farmfoods European Legends Links Championship	−10 (68-71-67=206)	1 stroke	(England) Barry Lane

European Senior Tour playoff record (0–1)

No.	Year	Tournament	Opponent	Result
1	2019	Paris Legends Championship	(England) David Shacklady	Lost to par on first extra hole

== Results in major championships ==
Tournament	1997	1998	1999	2000	2001	2002	2003	2004	2005
The Open Championship	CUT	CUT		CUT		CUT		CUT	CUT
PGA Championship								T17	CUT

Note: Remésy never played in the Masters Tournament nor the U.S. Open.

Did not play

CUT = Missed the half-way cut
"T" = tied

== Results in World Golf Championships ==
Tournament	2004
Match Play	
Championship	T57
Invitational	

Did not play

"T" = Tied

== Team appearances ==
Amateur

- European Amateur Team Championship (representing France): 1985
- Eisenhower Trophy (representing France): 1986

Professional

- Alfred Dunhill Cup (representing France): 1999, 2000
- World Cup (representing France): 1999
- Seve Trophy (representing Continental Europe): 2005
