= Miguel Ángel Martín (golfer) =

Spanish golfer

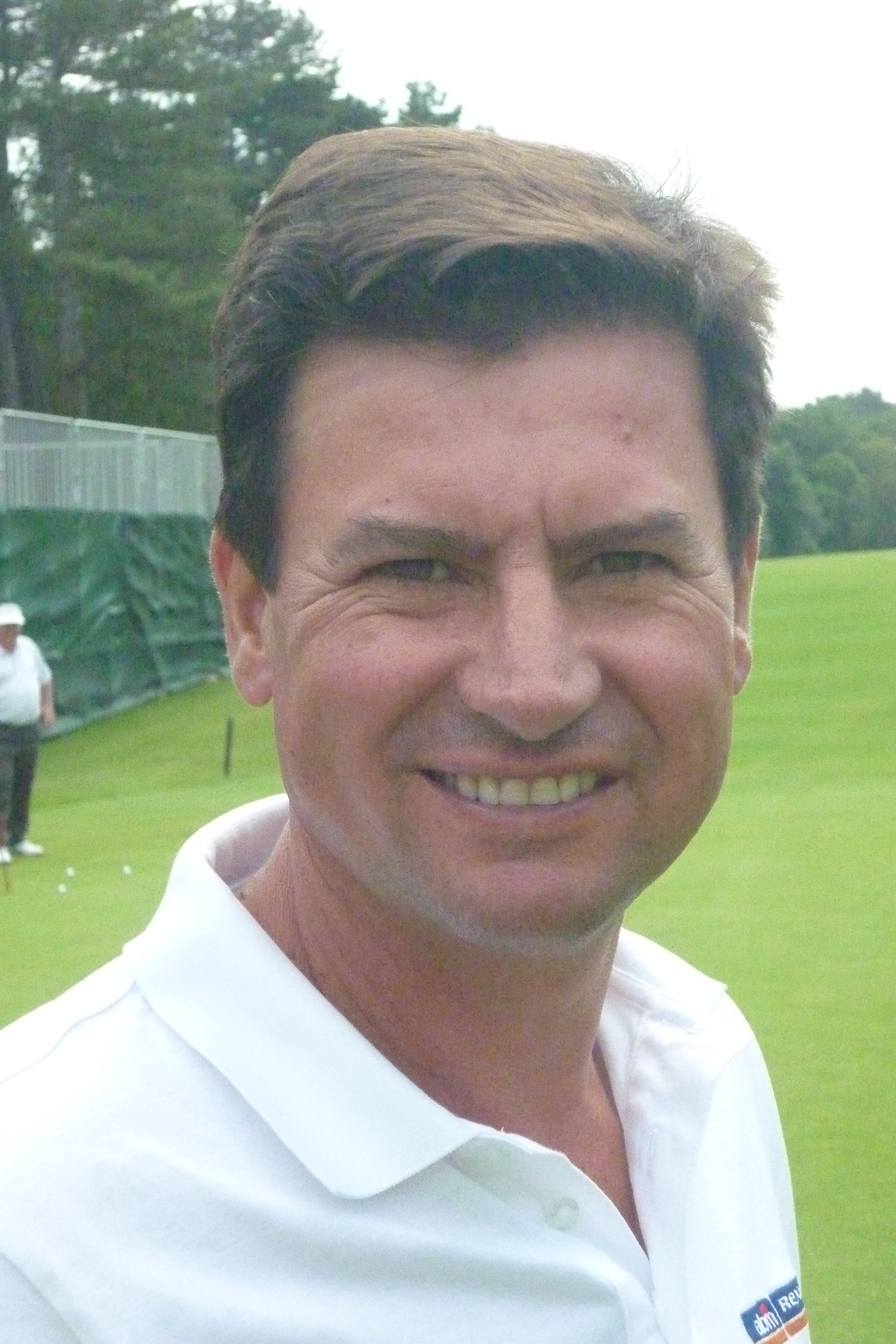

Personal information
- Full name: Miguel Ángel Martín
- Nationality: Spain
- Born: 2 May 1962 (age 64) Huelva, Spain
- Height: 5 ft 6 in (1.68 m)
- Weight: 154 lb (70 kg; 11.0 st)

Career
- Sport: Golf
- Turned professional: 1981
- Current tour: European Senior Tour
- Former tours: European Tour; Champions Tour
- Professional wins: 14
- Highest ranking: 68 (23 March 1997)

Number of wins by tour
- European Tour: 3
- PGA Tour of Australasia: 1
- Other: 11

Best results in major championships
- Masters Tournament: DNP
- PGA Championship: DNP
- U.S. Open: DNP
- The Open Championship: T24: 1999

Miguel Ángel Martín (born 2 May 1962) is a Spanish professional golfer.

== Career ==
Martín was born in Huelva. He started out as a caddie and turned professional in 1981. He has been a member of the European Tour for more than twenty seasons, and in 2005 he became the first Continental European golfer to make 500 appearances on the tour. He also attempted to make the PGA Tour in 1988. He was one of the 1988 PGA Tour Qualifying School graduates. His best finish on the Order of Merit was 17th in 1996 and he has won three European Tour events. He was also a member of the winning Spanish team at the 2000 Alfred Dunhill Cup.

In 1997 Martín earned a spot in the European Ryder Cup team via the money list, but was forced to withdraw after failing to recover from a wrist injury sustained in July. At the time he felt that he had been excluded in order to have a bigger name player involved. Martín wanted to make his own decision nearer the time, as José María Olazábal had done two years before, but the European Ryder Cup committee requested that he play 18 holes to prove his fitness. He refused as it was just 30 days after his surgery, and despite receiving support from many players, his place on the team was taken by Olazábal, who was next on the qualification list.

== Professional wins (14) ==
=== European Tour wins (3) ===
No.	Date	Tournament	Winning score	Margin of victory	Runner-up
1	28 Jun 1992	Peugeot Open de France	−8 (70-71-66-69=276)	2 strokes	(England) Martin Poxon
2	2 Feb 1997	Heineken Classic^{1}	−15 (70-67-65-71=273)	1 stroke	(United States) Fred Couples
3	20 Jun 1999	Moroccan Open	−12 (67-71-70-68=276)	Playoff	(Wales) David Park

^{1}Co-sanctioned by the PGA Tour of Australasia

European Tour playoff record (1–1)

No.	Year	Tournament	Opponent	Result
1	1996	One 2 One British Masters	(Australia) Robert Allenby	Lost after concession on first extra hole
2	1999	Moroccan Open	(Wales) David Park	Won with par on sixth extra hole

=== Hi5 Pro Tour wins (1) ===
No.	Date	Tournament	Winning score	Margin of victory	Runner-up
1	29 Feb 2012	Lumine Lakes Open 1	−8 (66-68=134)	Playoff	(Spain) Jordi García Pinto

=== Evolve Pro Tour wins (2) ===
No.	Date	Tournament	Winning score	Margin of victory	Runner(s)-up
1	28 Feb 2017	Hacienda Riquelme	−13 (67-68-68=203)	12 strokes	(Spain) David Borda
2	1 Feb 2019	Hacienda Riquelme (2)	−13 (70-70-63=203)	5 strokes	(Norway) Jarand Ekeland Arnøy, (Northern Ireland) Jonathan Caldwell

=== Other wins (8) ===
- 1986 SHA Grand Prix
- 1987 Spanish PGA Championship, Madrid Championship, South Open, Carilo Open
- 1996 Campeonato de Espana
- 2000 Madrid Championship
- 2004 Madrid Championship

== Results in major championships ==
Tournament	1987	1988	1989	1990	1991	1992	1993	1994	1995	1996	1997	1998	1999
The Open Championship	T62		T30	CUT	T64			CUT	CUT		CUT		T24

Note: Martín only played in The Open Championship.

Did not play

CUT = missed the half-way cut
"T" = tied

== Results in senior major championships ==
Results not in chronological order.

Tournament	2012	2013	2014	2015	2016	2017	2018	2019	2020	2021	2022	2023	2024	2025
The Tradition									NT					
Senior PGA Championship	CUT		CUT	CUT	T39	T38	T69	CUT	NT	CUT				
Senior Players Championship						T63	T61							
U.S. Senior Open			CUT	CUT	T37	T54	CUT	CUT	NT			CUT		
The Senior Open Championship	CUT	T45	T13	T22	T63	T6	CUT	T16	NT	T24	T29	CUT	T5	CUT

Top 10
Did not play

CUT = missed the halfway cut
"T" indicates a tie for a place
NT = no tournament due to COVID-19 pandemic

== Team appearances ==
- Europcar Cup (representing Spain): 1988
- Alfred Dunhill Cup (representing Spain): 1991, 1994, 1997, 2000 (winners)
- Ryder Cup (representing Europe): 1997 (injured, did not play)
- World Cup (representing Spain): 1997, 1998, 1999

== See also ==
- 1988 PGA Tour Qualifying School graduates
- Lowest rounds of golf
