= 1988 Open Championship =

Coordinates: 53.7495°N 3.0180°W

- Front cover of the 1988 Open Annual

Tournament information
- Dates: 14–18 July 1988
- Location: Lytham St Annes, England
- Course: Royal Lytham & St Annes Golf Club
- Tours: European Tour; PGA Tour

Statistics
- Par: 71
- Length: 6,857 yards (6,270 m)
- Field: 153 players, 71 after cut
- Cut: 148 (+6)
- Prize fund: £500,000 $750,000
- Winner's share: £80,000 $136,000

Champion
- (Spain) Seve Ballesteros
- 273 (−11)

Location in England

The 1988 Open Championship was a men's major golf championship and the 117th Open Championship, held from 14 to 18 July at the Royal Lytham & St Annes Golf Club in Lytham St Annes, England. In a first-ever Monday finish, Seve Ballesteros shot a final round 65 to capture his third Open Championship and fifth major title, two strokes ahead of runner-up Nick Price, the 54-hole leader.

Scheduled to finish on Sunday, heavy rain on Saturday caused flooding of several greens and the third round was scratched after play was started. Under European Tour rules, if less than half of the players had finished their rounds, the scores for that day were discarded. Since no player had finished, all the scores from Saturday were scrapped. Sunday was briefly scheduled for 36 holes, but due to the flooding, it was decided the course could not be readied in time for the early morning tee times. The third round was played on Sunday and the fourth on Monday, the first time in history the Open's final round finished on a Monday.

== Course layout ==
Hole	1	2	3	4	5	6	7	8	9	Out	10	11	12	13	14	15	16	17	18	In	Total
Yards	206	437	457	393	212	490	549	394	164	3,302	334	542	198	342	445	463	357	462	412	3,555	6,857
Par	3	4	4	4	3	5	5	4	3	35	4	5	3	4	4	4	4	4	4	36	71

Previous lengths of the course for The Open Championship (since 1950):

- 1979: 6,822 yards (6,238 m)
- 1974: 6,822 yards (6,238 m)
- 1969: 6,848 yards (6,262 m)
- 1963: 6,757 yards (6,179 m)
- 1958: 6,635 yards (6,067 m)
- 1952: 6,657 yards (6,087 m)

== Round summaries ==
=== First round ===
Thursday, 14 July 1988

Place	Player	Score	To par
1	(Spain) Seve Ballesteros	67	−4
T2	(United States) Brad Faxon	69	−2
T2	(Australia) Wayne Grady	69	−2
T4	(United States) Don Pooley	70	−1
T4	(Zimbabwe) Nick Price	70	−1
T4	(Australia) Noel Ratcliffe	70	−1
T4	(Australia) Peter Senior	70	−1
T8	(United States) Andy Bean	71	E
T8	(New Zealand) Bob Charles	71	E
T8	(England) Howard Clark	71	E
T8	(England) Nick Faldo	71	E
T8	(South Africa) David Frost	71	E
T8	(United States) Jay Haas	71	E
T8	(England) Mark James	71	E
T8	(United States) Gary Koch	71	E
T8	(England) David J. Russell	71	E
T8	(England) Andrew Sherborne	71	E
T8	(United States) Bob Tway	71	E

=== Second round ===
Friday, 15 July 1988

Place	Player	Score	To par
1	(Zimbabwe) Nick Price	70-67=137	−5
2	(Spain) Seve Ballesteros	67-71=138	−4
T3	(England) Nick Faldo	71-69=140	−2
T3	(United States) Craig Stadler	72-68=140	−2
5	(United States) Andy Bean	71-70=141	−1
T6	(United States) Fred Couples	73-69=142	E
T6	(Scotland) Sandy Lyle	73-69=142	E
T6	(United States) Bob Tway	71-71=142	E
T9	(Japan) Isao Aoki	72-71=143	+1
T9	(United States) Chip Beck	72-71=143	+1
T9	(England) Howard Clark	71-72=143	+1
T9	(United States) Brad Faxon	69=74=143	+1
T9	(United States) Gary Koch	71-72=143	+1
T9	(United States) Don Pooley	70-73=143	+1
T9	(Australia) Wayne Riley	72-71=143	+1
T9	(Argentina) Eduardo Romero	72-71=143	+1
T9	(Australia) Peter Senior	70-73=143	+1
T9	(England) Andrew Sherborne	71-72=143	+1

Amateurs: Broadhurst (+4), Cook (+11), Foster (+11), Härdin (+12), Nash (+12), Rymer (+18), Prosser (+21).

=== Third round ===
Sunday, 17 July 1988

Place	Player	Score	To par
1	(Zimbabwe) Nick Price	70-67-69=206	−7
T2	(Spain) Seve Ballesteros	67-71-70=208	−5
T2	(England) Nick Faldo	71-69-68=208	−5
4	(Scotland) Sandy Lyle	73-69-67=209	−4
T5	(United States) Andy Bean	71-70-71=212	−1
T5	(United States) Larry Nelson	73-71-68=212	−1
T5	(United States) Don Pooley	70-73-69=212	−1
T5	(Argentina) Eduardo Romero	72-71-69=212	−1
T9	(United States) Fred Couples	73-69-71=213	E
T9	(United States) Brad Faxon	69-74-70=213	E
T9	(United States) Gary Koch	71-72-70=213	E
T9	(Australia) Peter Senior	70-73-70=213	E

=== Final round ===
Monday, 18 July 1988

Champion
Silver Medal winner (low amateur)
(a) = amateur
(c) = past champion

Top 10
Place	Player	Score	To par	Money (£)
1	(Spain) Seve Ballesteros (c)	67-71-70-65=273	−11	80,000
2	(Zimbabwe) Nick Price	70-67-69-69=275	−9	60,000
3	(England) Nick Faldo (c)	71-69-68-71=279	−5	47,000
T4	(United States) Fred Couples	73-69-71-68=281	−3	33,500
T4	(United States) Gary Koch	71-72-70-68=281	−3	33,500
6	(Australia) Peter Senior	70-73-70-69=282	−2	27,000
T7	(Japan) Isao Aoki	72-71-73-67=283	−1	21,000
T7	(South Africa) David Frost	71-75-69-68=283	−1	21,000
T7	(Scotland) Sandy Lyle (c)	73-69-67-74=283	−1	21,000
T7	(United States) Payne Stewart	73-75-68-67=283	−1	21,000

Leaderboard below the top 10
Place	Player	Score	To par	Money (£)
T11	(United States) Brad Faxon	69-74-70-71=284	E	16,500
T11	(England) David J. Russell	71-74-69-70=284	E	16,500
T13	(United States) Larry Nelson	73-71-68-74=285	+1	14,000
T13	(Argentina) Eduardo Romero	72-71-69-74=285	+1	14,000
T13	(United States) Curtis Strange	79-69-69-68=285	+1	14,000
T16	(United States) Andy Bean	71-70-71-74=286	+2	10,500
T16	(United States) Ben Crenshaw	73-73-68-72=286	+2	10,500
T16	(United States) Don Pooley	70-73-69-74=286	+2	10,500
T16	(Spain) José Rivero	75-69-70-73=286	+2	10,500
T20	(Scotland) Gordon Brand Jnr	72-76-68-71=287	+3	7,000
T20	(New Zealand) Bob Charles (c)	71-74-69-73=287	+3	7,000
T20	(Australia) Rodger Davis	76-71-72-68=287	+3	7,000
T20	(United States) Tom Kite	75-71-73-68=287	+3	7,000
T20	(United States) Bob Tway	71-71-72-73=287	+3	7,000
T25	(United States) Jack Nicklaus (c)	75-70-75-68=288	+4	5,500
T25	(Wales) Ian Woosnam	76-71-72-69=288	+4	5,500
27	(United States) Mark O'Meara	75-69-75-70=289	+5	5,200
T28	(United States) Tommy Armour III	73-72-72-73=290	+6	4,600
T28	(United States) Chip Beck	72-71-74-73=290	+6	4,600
T28	(United States) Jim Benepe	75-72-70-73=290	+6	4,600
T28	(England) Howard Clark	71-72-75-72=290	+6	4,600
T28	(Zimbabwe) Mark McNulty	73-73-72-72=290	+6	4,600
T28	(United States) Tom Watson (c)	74-72-72-72=290	+6	4,600
T34	(Australia) Wayne Riley	72-71-72-76=291	+7	4,150
T34	(United States) Lanny Wadkins	73-71-71-76=291	+7	4,150
T36	(England) Gordon J. Brand	73-74-72-72=292	+8	3,950
T36	(Spain) José María Olazábal	73-71-73-75=292	+8	3,950
T38	(Scotland) Ken Brown	75-72-75-71=293	+9	3,456
T38	(Australia) Wayne Grady	69-76-72-76=293	+9	3,456
T38	(United States) Jay Haas	71-76-78-68=293	+9	3,456
T38	(Scotland) Brian Marchbank	73-74-73-73=293	+9	3,456
T38	(Australia) Graham Marsh	75-73-71-74=293	+9	3,456
T38	(United States) Corey Pavin	74-73-71-75=293	+9	3,456
T38	(Northern Ireland) Ronan Rafferty	74-74-71-74=293	+9	3,456
T38	(Australia) Noel Ratcliffe	70-77-76-70=293	+9	3,456
T38	(England) David A. Russell	72-73-72-76=293	+9	3,456
T47	(United States) Paul Azinger	72-75-73-74=294	+10	3,050
T47	(England) Paul Kent	74-70-79-71=294	+10	3,050
T47	(United States) Mark McCumber	75-71-72-76=294	+10	3,050
T47	(United States) Andy North	77-68-74-75=294	+10	3,050
T47	(Scotland) Sam Torrance	74-74-75-71=294	+10	3,050
T52	(Australia) Peter Fowler	72-72-78-73=295	+11	2,800
T52	(United States) Hubert Green	74-73-73-75=295	+11	2,800
T52	(United States) Johnny Miller	75-73-72-75=295	+11	2,800
T52	(Republic of Ireland) Philip Walton	72-74-75-74=295	+11	2,800
T52	(United States) Fuzzy Zoeller	72-74-76-73=295	+11	2,800
T57	(England) Paul Broadhurst (a)	73-73-74-76=296	+12	0
T57	(England) Carl Mason	75-69-77-75=296	+12	2,625
T57	(United States) Mike Smith	75-71-76-74=296	+12	2,625
T60	(South Africa) Gary Player (c)	72-76-73-76=297	+13	2,525
T60	(United States) Craig Stadler	72-68-81-76=297	+13	2,525
T62	(England) Simon Bishop	77-71-73-77=298	+14	2,400
T62	(England) Mark James	71-77-74-76=298	+14	2,400
T62	(England) Andrew Sherborne	71-72-76-77=298	+14	2,400
65	(Spain) Manuel Piñero	75-73-77-74=299	+15	2,300
66	(England) Paul Carman	77-71-80-73=301	+17	2,250
T67	(United States) Greg Bruckner	72-74-80-76=302	+18	2,175
T67	(Chinese Taipei) Hsieh Chin-sheng	74-73-73-82=302	+18	2,175
69	(West Germany) Bernhard Langer	73-75-75-80=303	+19	2,100
70	(England) Gary Stafford	76-72-78-79=305	+21	2,050
71	(England) Peter Mitchell	73-75-79-81=308	+24	2,000
CUT	(Australia) Ian Baker-Finch	76-73=149	+7	0
CUT	(United States) David Ishii	78-71=149	+7	0
CUT	(Japan) Hajime Meshiai	75-74=149	+7	0
CUT	(United States) Larry Mize	72-77=149	+7	0
CUT	(United States) Lee Trevino (c)	75-74=149	+7	0
CUT	(Italy) Alberto Binaghi	74-76=150	+8	0
CUT	(South Africa) John Bland	76-74=150	+8	0
CUT	(England) Andrew Chandler	75-75=150	+8	0
CUT	(England) Joe Higgins	74-76=150	+8	0
CUT	(Sweden) Mats Lanner	75-75=150	+8	0
CUT	(United States) Andrew Magee	72-78=150	+8	0
CUT	(Republic of Ireland) Christy O'Connor Jnr	75-75=150	+8	0
CUT	(Australia) Craig Parry	75-75=150	+8	0
CUT	(United States) Scott Verplank	72-78=150	+8	0
CUT	(England) Roger Chapman	73-78=151	+9	0
CUT	(England) Derrick Cooper	74-77=151	+9	0
CUT	(United States) Jamie Howell	77-74=151	+9	0
CUT	(Zimbabwe) Tony Johnstone	76-75=151	+9	0
CUT	(United States) Davis Love III	80-71=151	+9	0
CUT	(United States) Mike Reid	78-73=151	+9	0
CUT	(England) Mark Roe	76-75=151	+9	0
CUT	(Australia) Gerry Taylor	76-75=151	+9	0
CUT	(Scotland) Russell Weir	77-74=151	+9	0
CUT	(Sweden) Magnus Persson Atlevi	79-73=152	+10	0
CUT	(Republic of Ireland) Eamonn Darcy	78-74=152	+10	0
CUT	(England) Robert Lee	75-77=152	+10	0
CUT	(Sweden) Johan Ryström	74-78=152	+10	0
CUT	(Sweden) Ove Sellberg	79-73=152	+10	0
CUT	(United States) Richard Thompson	77-75=152	+10	0
CUT	(Australia) Lucien Tinkler	77-75=152	+10	0
CUT	(England) Clive Tucker	78-74=152	+10	0
CUT	(South Africa) Teddy Webber	79-73=152	+10	0
CUT	(South Africa) Hugh Baiocchi	79-74=153	+11	0
CUT	(England) Peter Baker	76-77=153	+11	0
CUT	(United States) Ron Commans	73-80=153	+11	0
CUT	(England) James Cook (a)	77-76=153	+11	0
CUT	(England) Denis Durnian	76-77=153	+11	0
CUT	(United States) Raymond Floyd	76-77=153	+11	0
CUT	(England) Trevor Fostor (a)	74-79=153	+11	0
CUT	(Australia) Peter McWhinney	76-77=153	+11	0
CUT	(England) David Williams	77-76=153	+11	0
CUT	(Australia) David Armstrong	80-74=154	+12	0
CUT	(England) David Gilford	78-76=154	+12	0
CUT	(Sweden) Cristian Härdin (a)	77-77=154	+12	0
CUT	(England) John Morgan	78-76=154	+12	0
CUT	(England) Tony Nash (a)	75-79=154	+12	0
CUT	(United States) Hal Sutton	76-78=154	+12	0
CUT	(Spain) José María Cañizares	77-78=155	+13	0
CUT	(Republic of Ireland) David Jones	78-77=155	+13	0
CUT	(England) Gordon Townhall	78-77=155	+13	0
CUT	(Nepal) Markus Agren	79-77=156	+14	0
CUT	(South Africa) Peter Akakasiaka	77-79=156	+14	0
CUT	(England) Neil Burke	80-76=156	+14	0
CUT	(Australia) Mike Harwood	79-77=156	+14	0
CUT	(Sweden) Leif Hederström	79-77=156	+14	0
CUT	(Scotland) Lindsay Mann	81-75=156	+14	0
CUT	(United States) David Thore	78-78=156	+14	0
CUT	(Scotland) James White	77-79=156	+14	0
CUT	(Sweden) Anders Forsbrand	79-78=157	+15	0
CUT	(England) Ged Furey	80-77=157	+15	0
CUT	(Chinese Taipei) Lu Chien-soon	78-79=157	+15	0
CUT	(England) Andy Rogers	82-75=157	+15	0
CUT	(United States) Michael Allen	83-75=158	+16	0
CUT	(England) Chris Moody	81-77=158	+16	0
CUT	(United States) Steve Pate	80-78=158	+16	0
CUT	(Denmark) Steen Tinning	76-82=158	+16	0
CUT	(England) Tony Jacklin (c)	80-79=159	+17	0
CUT	(Spain) José Cabo	79-81=160	+18	0
CUT	(United States) Mark Calcavecchia	76-84=160	+18	0
CUT	(England) Andrew Cotton	77-83=160	+18	0
CUT	(Australia) David Graham	79-81=160	+18	0
CUT	(Australia) Roger Mackay	80-80=160	+18	0
CUT	(Wales) Mark Mouland	76-84=160	+18	0
CUT	(United States) Charles Rymer (a)	83-77=160	+18	0
CUT	(Scotland) Sandy Stephen	82-78=160	+18	0
CUT	(Scotland) Alan McCloskey	83-78=161	+19	0
CUT	(England) David Whelan	81-80=161	+19	0
CUT	(England) Neil Hansen	80-82=162	+20	0
CUT	(England) Barry Lane	78-85=163	+21	0
CUT	(England) Darren Prosser (a)	81-82=163	+21	0
CUT	(South Africa) Robert Richardson	82-81=163	+21	0
WD	(Australia) Wayne Smith	81	+10	0

==== Scorecard ====
Hole	1	2	3	4	5	6	7	8	9	10	11	12	13	14	15	16	17	18
Par	3	4	4	4	3	5	5	4	3	4	5	3	4	4	4	4	4	4
(Spain) Ballesteros	−5	−5	−5	−5	−5	−6	−8	−9	−9	−10	−11	−10	−11	−10	−10	−11	−11	−11
(Zimbabwe) Price	−7	−6	−6	−6	−6	−7	−9	−9	−9	−10	−10	−10	−11	−10	−10	−10	−10	−9
(England) Faldo	−5	−4	−5	−5	−5	−6	−6	−6	−6	−5	−5	−6	−6	−6	−5	−5	−5	−5

Cumulative tournament scores, relative to par

Eagle	Birdie	Bogey	Double bogey	Triple bogey+
