= Mark Davis (golfer) =

English professional golfer

Personal information
- Full name: Mark Davis
- Nationality: England
- Born: 4 July 1964 (age 62) Brentwood, Essex, England
- Height: 5 ft 10 in (1.78 m)

Career
- Sport: Golf
- Turned professional: 1986
- Current tour: European Senior Tour
- Former tour: European Tour
- Professional wins: 3

Number of wins by tour
- European Tour: 2
- European Senior Tour: 1

Best results in major championships
- Masters Tournament: DNP
- PGA Championship: DNP
- U.S. Open: DNP
- The Open Championship: T30: 1989

Mark Davis (born 4 July 1964) is an English professional golfer.

== Early life and amateur career ==
Davis was born in Brentwood, Essex. In 1984, he won the Brabazon Trophy and represented England in the European Youths' Team Championship.

== Professional career ==
In 1986, Davis turned professional. Davis finished in the top hundred on the European Tour Order of Merit eight times, with a best of 31st in 1994, and twice won the Austrian Open (1991 and 1994). From 1999 onwards he was dogged by injuries, and his last full season on the tour was 2002.

== Amateur wins ==
- 1984 Brabazon Trophy
- 1985 Golf Illustrated Gold Vase

== Professional wins (3) ==
=== European Tour wins (2) ===
No.	Date	Tournament	Winning score	Margin of victory	Runner-up
1	29 Sep 1991	Mitsubishi Austrian Open	−19 (66-66-71-66=269)	5 strokes	(England) Michael McLean
2	14 Aug 1994	Hohe Brücke Open (2)	−18 (68-69-69-64=270)	2 strokes	(Republic of Ireland) Philip Walton

=== European Senior Tour wins (1) ===
No.	Date	Tournament	Winning score	Margin of victory	Runners-up
1	17 Aug 2014	SSE Scottish Senior Open	−5 (66-74-71=211)	5 strokes	(England) Philip Golding, (Spain) Pedro Linhart, (Argentina) César Monasterio, (England) David J. Russell

== Results in major championships ==
Tournament	1985	1986	1987	1988	1989	1990	1991	1992	1993	1994	1995
The Open Championship	CUT	CUT			T30			CUT	CUT	T35	T88

Note: Davis only played in The Open Championship.

Did not play

CUT = missed the half-way cut
"T" = tied

== Team appearances ==
Amateur

- European Youths' Team Championship (representing England): 1984
