= 2015 European Senior Tour =

Golf tour season

2015 European Senior Tour season
- Duration: 21 May 2015 – 13 December 2015
- Number of official events: 12
- Most wins: (Scotland) Colin Montgomerie (3)
- Order of Merit: (Scotland) Colin Montgomerie
- Rookie of the Year: (England) Paul Broadhurst

The 2015 European Senior Tour was the 24th season of the European Senior Tour, the main professional golf tour in Europe for men aged 50 and over.

== Schedule ==
The following table lists official events during the 2015 season.

Date	Tournament	Host country	Purse (€)	Winner (Note: The number in brackets after each winner's name is the number of European Senior Tour events they had won up to and including that tournament. This information is only shown for European Senior Tour members.)	Notes
24 May	Senior PGA Championship	United States	US$2,750,000	(Scotland) Colin Montgomerie (6)	Senior major championship
31 May	SSE Enterprise Wales Senior Open	Wales	£250,000	(England) Paul Wesselingh (8)	
6 Jun	Acorn Jersey Open	Jersey	£200,000	(Australia) Peter Fowler (4)	
14 Jun	ISPS Handa PGA Seniors Championship	England	£260,000	(Australia) Peter Fowler (5)	
28 Jun	U.S. Senior Open	United States	US$3,500,000	(United States) Jeff Maggert (n/a)	Senior major championship (Note: Official win; unofficial money.)
5 Jul	Swiss Seniors Open	Switzerland	300,000	(Austria) Gordon Manson (1)	
12 Jul	WINSTONgolf Senior Open	Germany	300,000	(Spain) Pedro Linhart (1)	
26 Jul	The Senior Open Championship	England	£1,300,000	(United States) Marco Dawson (n/a)	Senior major championship
29 Aug	Prostate Cancer UK Scottish Senior Open	Scotland	£250,000	(England) Paul Broadhurst (1)	
6 Sep	Travis Perkins Masters	England	£320,000	(Scotland) Colin Montgomerie (7)	
4 Oct	French Riviera Masters	France	400,000	(England) Simon P. Brown (3)	
13 Dec	MCB Tour Championship	Mauritius	420,000	(Scotland) Colin Montgomerie (8)	Tour Championship

== Order of Merit ==
The Order of Merit was based on prize money won during the season, calculated in Euros.

Position	Player	Prize money (€)
1	(Scotland) Colin Montgomerie	679,147
2	(Australia) Peter Fowler	222,342
3	(England) Barry Lane	171,191
4	(Austria) Gordon Manson	143,699
5	(England) Philip Golding	108,127

== Awards ==
Award	Winner	Ref.
Rookie of the Year	(England) Paul Broadhurst	
