= Swiss Seniors Open =

Tournament information
- Location: Bad Ragaz, Switzerland
- Established: 1997
- Course: Bad Ragaz Golf Club
- Par: 70
- Length: 6,164 yards (5,636 m)
- Tour: European Senior Tour
- Format: Stroke play
- Prize fund: €350,000
- Month played: July

Tournament record score
- Aggregate: 194 Carl Mason (2007)
- To par: −16 as above

Current champion
- (New Zealand) Mark Brown

Final champion
- Location in Switzerland

The Swiss Seniors Open is the Swiss stop on men's professional golf's European Senior Tour. It was founded in 1997 as the Credit Suisse Private Banking Seniors Open and from 1999 to 2014 was known as the Bad Ragaz PGA Seniors Open. It is played at Bad Ragaz Golf Club. In 2019 the prize fund was €320,000.

== Winners ==
Year	Winner	Score	To par	Margin of victory	Runner(s)-up
Swiss Seniors Open
2025	(New Zealand) Mark Brown	195	−15	2 strokes	(England) Robert Coles (South Africa) Keith Horne (England) Van Phillips
2024	(Sweden) Jarmo Sandelin	200	−10	1 stroke	(Wales) Bradley Dredge
2023	(Brazil) Adilson da Silva	195	−15	2 strokes	(South Africa) James Kingston
2022	(South Africa) James Kingston	199	−11	3 strokes	(Wales) Phillip Price (England) David Shacklady
2021	Cancelled due to the COVID-19 pandemic				
2020: No tournament
2019	(Argentina) José Cóceres	199	−11	2 strokes	(England) Peter Baker (Australia) Peter O'Malley (Wales) Phillip Price (France) Jean-François Remésy (South Africa) Chris Williams
2018	(France) Jean-François Remésy	199	−11	1 stroke	(Spain) Miguel Ángel Martín (Wales) Phillip Price (Sweden) Jarmo Sandelin
2017	(England) Philip Golding	195	−15	1 stroke	(Republic of Ireland) Mark McNulty
2016	(United States) Tim Thelen (2)	200	−10	1 stroke	(England) Simon P. Brown (Spain) Pedro Linhart (Spain) Miguel Ángel Martín
2015	(Austria) Gordon Manson	196	−14	2 strokes	(England) Philip Golding
Bad Ragaz PGA Seniors Open
2014	(Canada) Rick Gibson	195	−15	6 strokes	(Republic of Ireland) Denis O'Sullivan
2013	(England) Paul Wesselingh	201	−9	Playoff	(England) Kevin Spurgeon
2012	(United States) Tim Thelen	198	−12	2 strokes	(England) Mark James
2011	(Australia) Peter Fowler	196	−14	2 strokes	(Scotland) Andrew Oldcorn
2010	(England) Carl Mason (3)	199	−11	2 strokes	(United States) Jerry Bruner
2009	(South Africa) John Bland	199	−11	Playoff	(United States) Bob Boyd
2008	(England) Carl Mason (2)	195	−15	2 strokes	(Scotland) Bill Longmuir
2007	(England) Carl Mason	194	−16	6 strokes	(Argentina) Horacio Carbonetti (Italy) Costantino Rocca (England) David J. Russell
2006	(Spain) Juan Quirós	196	−14	2 strokes	(England) Carl Mason
2005	(Australia) Terry Gale	199	−11	2 strokes	(Argentina) Luis Carbonetti (France) Géry Watine
2004	(Argentina) Horacio Carbonetti (2)	195	−15	Playoff	(England) Denis Durnian
2003	(Argentina) Horacio Carbonetti	197	−13	3 strokes	(Australia) David Good
2002	(Japan) Dragon Taki	130 (Note: Shortened to 36 holes due to rain.)	−10	Playoff	(Republic of Ireland) Denis O'Sullivan
2001	(Scotland) David Huish (2)	198	−12	Playoff	(Australia) David Good
2000	(Scotland) David Huish	200	−10	4 strokes	(England) Jim Rhodes
1999	(Australia) Bob Shearer	198	−12	3 strokes	(United States) David Oakley
Credit Suisse Private Banking Seniors Open
1998	(South Africa) Bobby Verwey	200	−10	2 strokes	(England) Maurice Bembridge (England) Tommy Horton
1997	(England) Brian Waites	203	−7	Playoff	(England) Malcolm Gregson
