= Paul Wesselingh =

English golfer (born 1961)

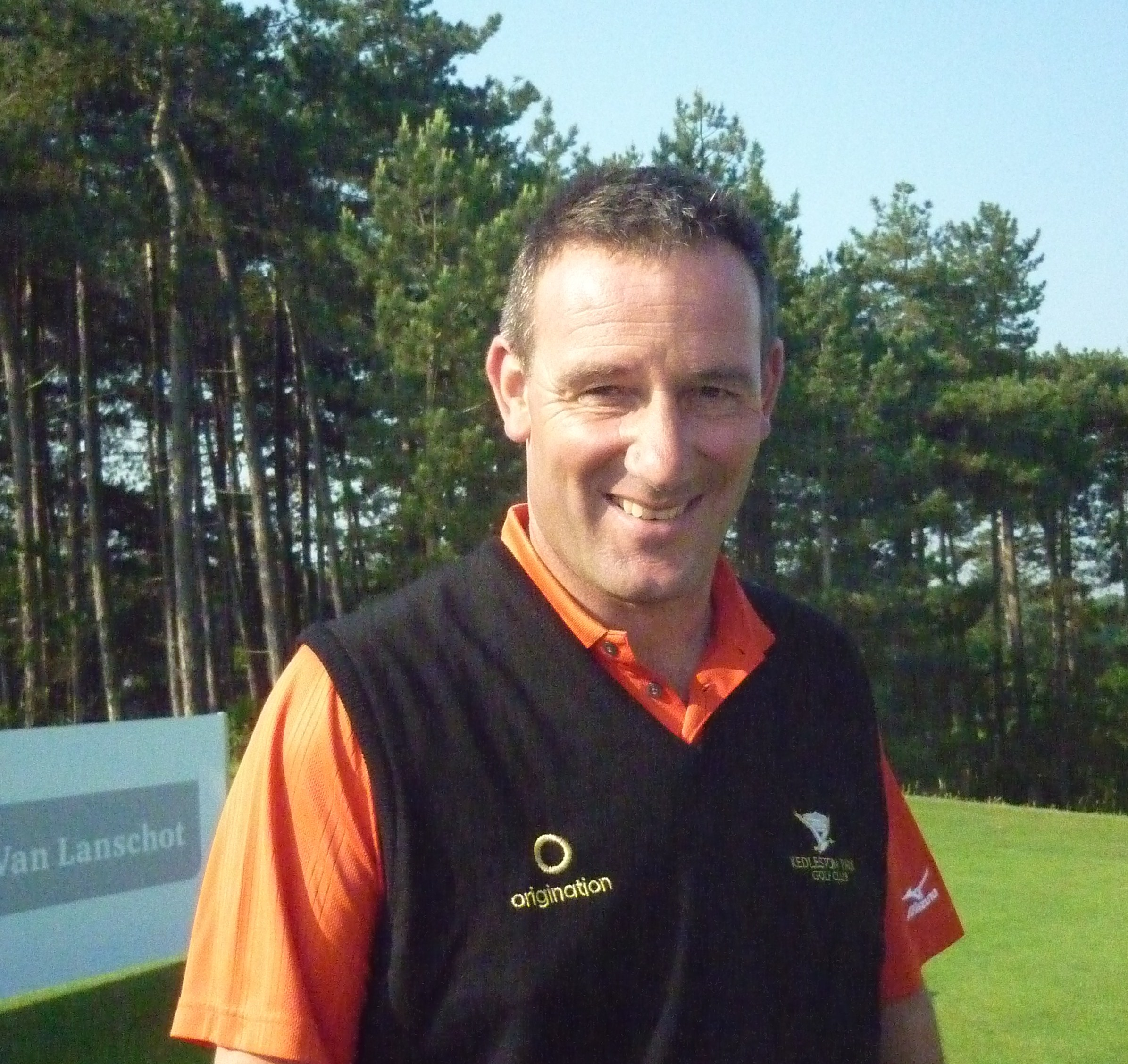

Personal information
- Nationality: England
- Born: 11 October 1961 (age 65) Liverpool, England
- Height: 6 ft (183 cm)
- Spouses: Tracy (m. 1987; div. 2018) Jacqueline (m. 2019)
- Children: 3

Career
- Sport: Golf
- Turned professional: 1985
- Current tour: European Senior Tour
- Former tour: Champions Tour
- Professional wins: 15

Number of wins by tour
- European Senior Tour: 8 (Tied-8th all-time)
- Other: 7

Best results in major championships
- Masters Tournament: DNP
- PGA Championship: DNP
- U.S. Open: DNP
- The Open Championship: T68: 2004

Achievements and awards
- European Senior Tour Rookie of the Year: 2012
- European Senior Tour Order of Merit winner: 2013

Paul Wesselingh (born 11 October 1961) is an English professional golfer who plays on the European Senior Tour.

== Career ==
Wesselingh was born in Liverpool. He turned professional in 1985 but opted for a career as a club professional rather than attempting a touring career, due to his desire to stay close to his young family. His club career culminated in a position as senior professional at Kedleston Park Golf Club in Derbyshire, where he succeeded former European Tour player David J. Russell. During this stage of his career, Wesselingh won the European Club Professionals Championship, played three times in The Open Championship and played on three GB&I teams against the USA in the PGA Cup.

Upon turning 50 in 2011, Wesselingh opted to play on the European Senior Tour, coming through the qualifying school at the end of that year. He was runner-up in his first tournament, and claimed his first win three events later at the ISPS Handa PGA Seniors Championship. Wesselingh defended the ISPS Handa PGA Seniors Championship in 2013, winning by four strokes for his second win on the seniors tour. Victories as such lead to him receiving the Rookie of the Year in 2012. Following his early success on the European Seniors Tour, he continued making himself a strong contender in the years to follow. 2013 saw his most successful year to date, winning five tournaments including the tour championship event held at Belle Mare Plage resort in Mauritius, earning him the number one spot for the tours Order of Merit for the 2013 season.

== Professional wins (15) ==
=== Regular career wins (7) ===
- 1994 PGA North Region
- 2002 European Club Professionals Championship, Derbyshire Matchplay
- 2003 Derbyshire Strokeplay
- 2005 Lombard Trophy
- 2006 Glenmuir Club Professional Championship
- 2008 Midland Invitational

=== European Senior Tour wins (8) ===
Legend
Tour Championships (2)
Other European Senior Tour (6)

No.	Date	Tournament	Winning score	Margin of victory	Runner(s)-up
1	10 Jun 2012	ISPS Handa PGA Seniors Championship	−6 (72-71-67=210) (Note: Shortened to 54 holes due to weather.)	1 stroke	(Sweden) Anders Forsbrand, (Scotland) Andrew Oldcorn
2	9 Jun 2013	ISPS Handa PGA Seniors Championship (2)	−20 (68-70-70-64=272)	4 strokes	(Paraguay) Ángel Franco
3	7 Jul 2013	Bad Ragaz PGA Seniors Open	−9 (71-66-64=201)	Playoff	(England) Kevin Spurgeon
4	17 Nov 2013	Fubon Senior Open	−9 (69-68-70=207)	1 stroke	(Taiwan) Lu Wen-teh
5	15 Dec 2013	MCB Tour Championship	−14 (67-66-69=202)	5 strokes	(South Africa) David Frost, (Spain) Miguel Ángel Martín
6	21 Sep 2014	WINSTONgolf Senior Open	−15 (69-67-65=201)	Playoff	(England) Philip Golding, (Germany) Bernhard Langer
7	14 Dec 2014	MCB Tour Championship (2)	−9 (69-69-69=207)	Playoff	(England) Barry Lane
8	31 May 2015	SSE Enterprise Wales Senior Open	−7 (69-67-67=203)	2 strokes	(Australia) Peter Fowler, (Wales) Ian Woosnam

European Senior Tour playoff record (3–0)

No.	Year	Tournament	Opponent(s)	Result
1	2013	Bad Ragaz PGA Seniors Open	(England) Kevin Spurgeon	Won with birdie on third extra hole
2	2014	WINSTONgolf Senior Open	(England) Philip Golding, (Germany) Bernhard Langer	Won with birdie on third extra hole Golding eliminated by par on second hole
3	2014	MCB Tour Championship	(England) Barry Lane	Won with par on sixth extra hole

== Results in major championships ==
Tournament	1992	1993	1994	1995	1996	1997	1998	1999	2000	2001	2002	2003	2004
The Open Championship	CUT											CUT	T68

Note: Wesselingh only played in The Open Championship.

Did not play

CUT = missed the half-way cut
"T" = tied

== See also ==
- List of golfers with most European Senior Tour wins
