= Tim Thelen =

American professional golfer

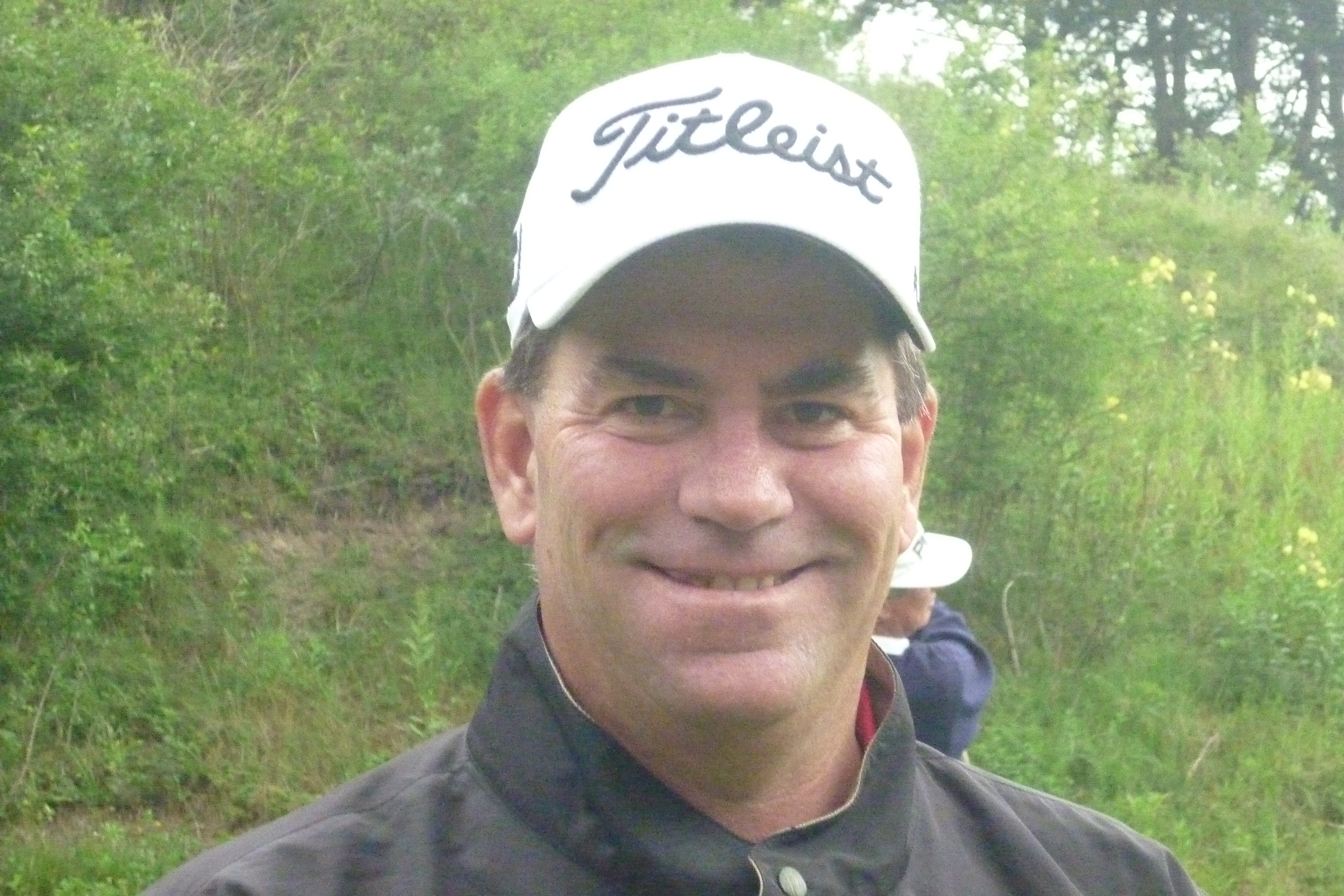
- Thelen in 2011

Personal information
- Nationality: United States
- Born: June 14, 1961 (age 65) Albany, Minnesota, U.S.
- Height: 5 ft 10 in (1.78 m)
- Weight: 195 lb (88 kg; 13.9 st)

Career
- Sport: Golf
- College: Foothills Junior College; Houston Baptist University
- Turned professional: 1985
- Current tours: European Senior Tour; Champions Tour
- Professional wins: 13

Number of wins by tour
- European Senior Tour: 5
- Other: 8

Best results in major championships
- Masters Tournament: DNP
- PGA Championship: CUT: 1999-2003, 2005, 2007-08, 2010
- U.S. Open: DNP
- The Open Championship: DNP

Tim Thelen (born June 14, 1961) is an American professional golfer.

== Early life ==
Thelen was born in Albany, Minnesota. He played college golf at Foothills Junior College and then Houston Baptist University. At Houston, he was teammates with Colin Montgomerie.

== Professional career ==
He worked as a club professional, winning the PGA Club Professional Championship in 2000 and 2003, as well as the 2009 PGA Assistant Professional Championship. He played in nine PGA Championships but failed to make the cut in any of them. He won the 2001 PGA Professional Player of the Year award.

After turning 50, Thelen won the European Senior Tour qualifying school in 2010. He finished 24th on the Tour's Order of Merit in 2011 and won his first Tour event at the 2012 Berenberg Bank Masters in Germany. He won his second event the following week at the Bad Ragaz PGA Seniors Open. He would win his third event on the tour later in the season, when he took the Fubon Senior Open in November. Thelen would win his fourth event on the European Senior Tour in September 2014, with a win at the Senior Open de Portugal.

== Awards and honors ==
In 2001, Thelen was honored as PGA Professional Player of the Year

== Professional wins (13) ==
=== Regular wins (8) ===
- 2000 PGA Club Professional Championship
- 2001 Southern Texas PGA Championship
- 2003 PGA Club Professional Championship
- 2005 BP Trinidad Open
- 2006 BP Trinidad Open
- 2008 Southern Texas PGA Championship
- 2009 PGA Club Professional Championship, Southern Texas PGA Championship

=== European Senior Tour wins (5) ===
No.	Date	Tournament	Winning score	Margin of victory	Runner(s)-up
1	Jul 1, 2012	Berenberg Bank Masters	−15 (66-68-67=201)	3 strokes	(Australia) Peter Fowler, (England) Barry Lane, (Wales) Mark Mouland
2	Jul 8, 2012	Bad Ragaz PGA Seniors Open	−12 (66-65-67=198)	2 strokes	(England) Mark James
3	Nov 11, 2012	Fubon Senior Open	−14 (66-67-69=202)	5 strokes	(Philippines) Frankie Miñoza, (South Africa) Chris Williams
4	Sep 14, 2014	Senior Open de Portugal	−12 (68-64-72=204)	1 stroke	(Spain) Miguel Ángel Martín
5	Jul 3, 2016	Swiss Seniors Open (2)	−10 (67-66-67=200)	1 stroke	(England) Simon P. Brown, (Spain) Pedro Linhart, (Spain) Miguel Ángel Martín

European Senior Tour playoff record (0–1)

No.	Year	Tournament	Opponent	Result
1	2012	French Riviera Masters	(England) David J. Russell	Lost to par on third extra hole

== Results in major championships ==
Tournament	1999	2000	2001	2002	2003	2004	2005	2006	2007	2008	2009	2010
PGA Championship	CUT	CUT	CUT	CUT	CUT		CUT		CUT	CUT		CUT

Did not play

CUT = missed the half-way cut
Note: Thelen only played in the PGA Championship.

== U.S. national team appearances ==
- PGA Cup: 2000 (winners), 2003 (winners), 2005, 2007 (winners)

== See also ==
- List of golfers with most European Senior Tour wins
