= WINSTONgolf Senior Open =

WINSTONgolf Senior Open Invitational
Tournament information
- Location: Vorbeck, Germany
- Established: 2012
- Courses: WINSTONgolf (WINSTONlinks Course)
- Par: 72
- Length: 6,747 yards (6,169 m)
- Tour: European Senior Tour
- Format: Stroke play
- Prize fund: €500,000
- Month played: September

Tournament record score
- Aggregate: 195 Bernhard Langer (2025)
- To par: −21 as above

Current champion
- (Germany) Bernhard Langer

Final champion
- Location in Germany Location in Mecklenburg-Vorpommern

The WINSTONgolf Senior Open is a men's senior (over 50) professional golf tournament on the European Senior Tour. It has been held since 2012 at WINSTONgolf, Vorbeck in Northern Germany. From 2012 to 2015 it was played on the Open course while from 2016 to 2018 it was held on the Links course. The event returned to the Open course in 2019.

The 2021 event was played as an invitational event with 20 professionals competing over 36 holes.

== Winners ==
Year	Tour (Note: EST − European Senior Tour.)	Winner	Score	To par	Margin of victory	Runner(s)-up
WINSTONgolf Senior Open
2025	EST	(Germany) Bernhard Langer	195	−21	6 strokes	(Sweden) Patrik Sjöland
2024	EST	(England) Van Phillips	204	−12	Playoff	(England) Phillip Archer (Brazil) Adilson da Silva
2023	EST	(Australia) Scott Hend	206	−10	1 stroke	(England) Phillip Archer (England) Peter Baker
2022	EST	(Australia) Richard Green	208	−8	Playoff	(England) Phillip Archer
WINSTONgolf Senior Open Invitational
2021		(South Africa) James Kingston	137	−7	4 strokes	(England) Paul Streeter
WINSTONgolf Senior Open
2020: No tournament
2019	EST	(United States) Clark Dennis	201	−15	1 stroke	(Spain) José María Olazábal
2018	EST	(Wales) Stephen Dodd	201	−15	6 strokes	(France) Jean-François Remésy
2017	EST	(Wales) Phillip Price	202	−14	1 stroke	(Thailand) Thaworn Wiratchant
2016	EST	(Scotland) Andrew Oldcorn	208	−8	Playoff	(England) Paul Broadhurst
2015	EST	(Spain) Pedro Linhart	200	−16	3 strokes	(England) Barry Lane
2014	EST	(England) Paul Wesselingh	201	−15	Playoff	(England) Philip Golding (Germany) Bernhard Langer
2013	EST	(Scotland) Gordon Brand Jnr	204	−12	1 stroke	(Paraguay) Ángel Franco (Scotland) Andrew Oldcorn (England) David J. Russell
Pon Senior Open
2012	EST	(Australia) Terry Price	200	−16	6 strokes	(France) Marc Farry (England) Barry Lane
