= MCB Tour Championship =

MCB Mauritius Legends
Tournament information
- Location: Poste de Flacq, Mauritius
- Established: 2009
- Course: Constance Belle Mare Plage
- Par: 72
- Length: 6,018 yards (5,503 m)
- Tour: European Senior Tour
- Format: Stroke play
- Prize fund: US$750,000
- Month played: December

Tournament record score
- Aggregate: 193 Thaworn Wiratchant (2017); 193 Clark Dennis (2018)
- To par: −23 as above

Current champion
- (England) Greg Owen

Final champion
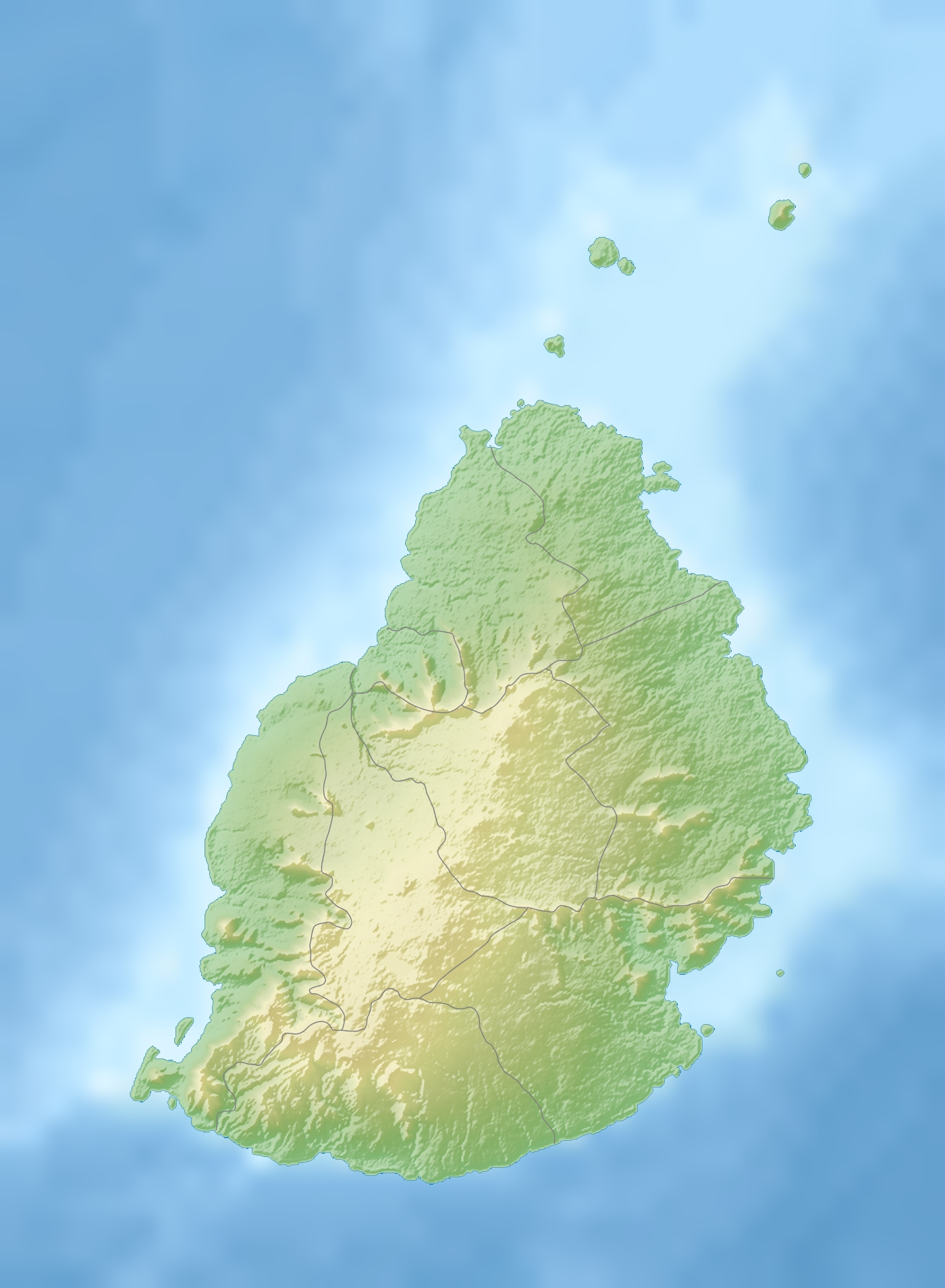
- Location in Mauritius

The MCB Tour Championship is a men's senior (over 50) professional golf tournament on the European Senior Tour. It has been held every year, in December, since 2009.

== History ==
The event was formed in 2009 and was called the Mauritius Commercial Bank Open, being was played at the start of the 2010 season. In 2011, it became the final event of the season, maintaining that place until 2018. It was played at the Constance Belle Mare Plage in Mauritius.

In 2018 the Tour Championship consisted of two tournaments. The MCB Tour Championship Mauritius was played at Constance Belle Mare Plage followed by the MCB Tour Championship Seychelles the following week, played at Constance Lemuria, Praslin Island, Seychelles. The 2019 Tour Championship was extended to three tournaments with an extra tournament at International Golf Club Du Rova near Antananarivo, Madagascar. The event in Madagascar was followed by the events in Seychelles and Mauritius.

== Winners ==
| European Senior Tour (Tour Championship) | 2011– |
| European Senior Tour (Regular) | 2009–2010 |

| # | Year | Winner | Score | To par | Margin of victory | Runner(s)-up |
MCB Mauritius Legends
| 15th | 2025 | (England) Greg Owen | 198 | −18 | 1 stroke | (South Africa) Darren Fichardt (India) Jeev Milkha Singh |
MCB Tour Championship
| 14th | 2024 | (England) Peter Baker (2) | 200 | −16 | Playoff | (England) Simon Griffiths |
| 13th | 2023 | (England) Peter Baker | 201 | −15 | 1 stroke | (Australia) Peter Fowler (Sweden) Patrik Sjöland |
| 12th | 2022 (Dec) (Note: In 2022, the MCB Tour Championship was played over two events; in the Seychelles and Mauritius.) | | | | | |
| 12th | 2022 (Dec) | MCB Tour Championship (Seychelles) | | | | |
| 12th | 2022 (Dec) | (Sweden) Joakim Haeggman | 199 | −11 | 4 strokes | (Brazil) Adilson da Silva |
| 12th | 2022 (Dec) | MCB Tour Championship (Mauritius) | | | | |
| 12th | 2022 (Dec) | (Denmark) Thomas Bjørn | 196 | −20 | 7 strokes | (England) Simon P. Brown (South Africa) James Kingston |
| – | 2022 (Apr) | Cancelled due to rain | | | | |
| – | 2021 | No tournament due to the COVID-19 pandemic | | | | |
| – | 2020: No tournament | | | | | |
| 11th | 2019 (Note: In 2019, the MCB Tour Championship was played over three events; in Madagascar, the Seychelles and Mauritius.) | | | | | |
| 11th | 2019 | MCB Tour Championship (Madagascar) | | | | |
| 11th | 2019 | (England) Barry Lane | 210 | −3 | 1 stroke | (Spain) Juan Quirós (France) Jean-François Remésy |
| 11th | 2019 | MCB Tour Championship (Seychelles) | | | | |
| 11th | 2019 | (Australia) Peter Fowler | 206 | −4 | 1 stroke | (South Africa) James Kingston |
| 11th | 2019 | MCB Tour Championship (Mauritius) | | | | |
| 11th | 2019 | (Sweden) Jarmo Sandelin | 204 | −12 | 3 strokes | (South Africa) James Kingston |
| 10th | 2018 (Note: In 2018, the MCB Tour Championship was played over two events; in Mauritius and the Seychelles.) | | | | | |
| 10th | 2018 | MCB Tour Championship (Mauritius) | | | | |
| 10th | 2018 | (United States) Clark Dennis | 193 | −23 | 8 strokes | (Sweden) Magnus Persson Atlevi |
| 10th | 2018 | MCB Tour Championship (Seychelles) | | | | |
| 10th | 2018 | (England) Roger Chapman | 175 (Note: Shortened to 48 holes due to weather.) | −6 | Playoff | (Wales) Phillip Price |
MCB Tour Championship
| 9th | 2017 | (Thailand) Thaworn Wiratchant | 193 | −23 | 8 strokes | (Republic of Ireland) Mark McNulty |
| 8th | 2016 | (England) Barry Lane | 202 | −14 | 1 stroke | (England) Paul Broadhurst |
| 7th | 2015 | (Scotland) Colin Montgomerie | 201 | −15 | 3 strokes | (South Africa) David Frost |
| 6th | 2014 | (England) Paul Wesselingh (2) | 207 | −9 | Playoff | (England) Barry Lane |
| 5th | 2013 | (England) Paul Wesselingh | 202 | −14 | 5 strokes | (South Africa) David Frost (Spain) Miguel Ángel Martín |
| 4th | 2012 | (South Africa) David Frost (2) | 205 | −11 | 1 stroke | (Australia) Peter Fowler (England) Barry Lane |
| 3rd | 2011 | (United States) Tom Lehman | 204 | −12 | 1 stroke | (South Africa) David Frost |
Mauritius Commercial Bank Open
| 2nd | 2010 | (South Africa) David Frost | 203 | −13 | Playoff | (England) Roger Chapman |
| 1st | 2009 | (England) Kevin Spurgeon | 210 | −6 | 1 stroke | (England) Gordon J. Brand |
