= Berenberg Masters =

Tournament information
- Location: Refrath, Germany
- Established: 2010
- Course: Golf-und Land-Club Köln
- Par: 72
- Length: 6,780 yards (6,200 m)
- Tour: European Senior Tour
- Format: Stroke play
- Prize fund: €400,000
- Month played: August
- Final year: 2013

Tournament record score
- Aggregate: 201 Tim Thelen (2012)
- To par: −15 as above

Final champion
- (Denmark) Steen Tinning

Location map
- Location in Germany Location in North Rhine-Westphalia

The Berenberg Masters was a men's golf tournament on the European Senior Tour. The tournament was held from 2010 to 2013. It was sponsored by and named for Berenberg Bank.

The first edition was played at The Links at Fancourt, George, South Africa, after which it moved to Germany. It was played at the Cologne Golf and Country Club, Bergisch Gladbach, Cologne in 2011, at Wörthsee Golf Club, Wörthsee near Munich in 2012 before returning to Cologne Golf and Country Club in 2013. The prize fund was €500,000 in 2010 and €400,000 from 2011 to 2013. The 2012 tournament was won by Tim Thelen; his first European Senior Tour win.

== Winners ==
Year	Winner	Score	To par	Margin of victory	Runner(s)-up	Venue
Berenberg Masters
2013	(Denmark) Steen Tinning	207	–9	1 stroke	(Germany) Bernhard Langer	Cologne
Berenberg Bank Masters
2012	(United States) Tim Thelen	201	–15	3 strokes	(Australia) Peter Fowler (England) Barry Lane (Wales) Mark Mouland	Wörthsee
2011	(Wales) Ian Woosnam	207	–9	2 strokes	(Chile) Ángel Fernández	Cologne
2010	(Thailand) Boonchu Ruangkit	216	–3	3 strokes	(South Africa) Bobby Lincoln (Scotland) Sam Torrance	Fancourt
