= 2021 European Senior Tour =

Golf tour season

2021 European Senior Tour season
- Duration: 27 May 2021 – 3 April 2022
- Number of official events: 11 (Note: A further three tournaments were scheduled but were either cancelled or otherwise removed from the schedule.)
- Most wins: (France) Thomas Levet (2)
- Order of Merit: (Wales) Stephen Dodd

The 2021 European Senior Tour, titled as the 2021 Legends Tour, was the 29th season of the European Senior Tour, the main professional golf tour in Europe for men aged 50 and over.

== Schedule ==
The following table lists official events during the 2021 season.

Date	Tournament	Host country	Purse (€)	Winner (Note: The number in brackets after each winner's name is the number of European Senior Tour events they had won up to and including that tournament. This information is only shown for European Senior Tour members.)	Notes
30 May	KitchenAid Senior PGA Championship	United States	US$3,500,000	(Germany) Alex Čejka (1)	Senior major championship
~~6 Jun~~	ICL Jersey Legends	Jersey	–	Removed	
20 Jun	Farmfoods European Legends Links Championship	England	300,000	(South Africa) Chris Williams (3)	
~~4 Jul~~	Swiss Seniors Open	Switzerland	–	Cancelled	
11 Jul	U.S. Senior Open	United States	US$4,000,000	(United States) Jim Furyk (n/a)	Senior major championship (Note: Official win; unofficial money.)
25 Jul	The Senior Open Championship	England	US$2,500,000	(Wales) Stephen Dodd (4)	Senior major championship
1 Aug	Staysure PGA Seniors Championship	England	400,000	(England) Paul Broadhurst (6)	
22 Aug	Irish Legends	Ireland	270,000	(Denmark) Thomas Bjørn (1)	
4 Sep (Note: Added to the schedule in April.)	Legends Open de France	France	180,000	(France) Thomas Levet (2)	
12 Sep	Scottish Senior Open	Scotland	270,000	(France) Thomas Levet (3)	
3 Oct	Farmfoods European Senior Masters	England	300,000	(Austria) Markus Brier (1)	
10 Oct; ~~9 May~~	Riegler & Partner Legends	Austria	225,000	(Argentina) Mauricio Molina (1)	
5 Nov; ~~16 May~~	Sergio Melpignano Senior Italian Open	Italy	270,000	(South Africa) James Kingston (1)	
~~3 Apr~~; ~~12 Dec~~	MCB Tour Championship (Mauritius)	Mauritius	–	Cancelled (Note: Cancelled due to rain.)	Tour Championship

=== Unofficial events ===
The following events were sanctioned by the European Senior Tour, but did not carry official money, nor were wins official.

Date	Tournament	Host country	Purse (€)	Winner	Notes
16 Jul	WINSTONgolf Senior Open Invitational	Germany	100,000	(South Africa) James Kingston	

== Order of Merit ==
The Order of Merit was based on tournament results during the season, calculated using a points-based system.

Position	Player	Points
1	(Wales) Stephen Dodd	1,830
2	(Spain) Miguel Ángel Jiménez	1,531
3	(France) Thomas Levet	1,436
4	(Austria) Markus Brier	1,379
5	(South Africa) James Kingston	1,324
