= Andersen Consulting World Championship of Golf =

The Andersen Consulting World Championship of Golf was a 32-man match play golf tournament played in 1995, 1997 and 1998. It was the predecessor tournament to the WGC-Accenture Match Play Championship which started in 1999.

The top eight players available from four different regions, the United States, Europe, Japan, and the "Rest of the World", were selected from the Sony Rankings. Each region played three rounds of match play to determine the regional winner to send to the finals. The regional tournaments were played at various times (February to August) throughout the year at different courses in the U.S., Europe, and Japan.

The semi-finals and finals were played in late December 1995 and early January in 1997 and 1998 at the Grayhawk Golf Club in Scottsdale, Arizona, United States. All matches were played over 18 holes except the final which was played over 36 holes. The purse each year was US$3,650,000 with $1,000,000 going to the winner.

The World Golf Championships (WGC) were formed in 1999 and Andersen Consulting remained as the sponsor of the match play championship. The first WGC event, the 1999 WGC-Andersen Consulting Match Play Championship took place in February 1999. The format changed to a 64-man tournament played over one week with the field drawn from the Official World Golf Rankings.

== Winners ==
Year	Player	Country	Score	Runner-up	Third place	Fourth place
1995	Barry Lane	England	2 up	(South Africa) David Frost	(United States) Mark McCumber	(Japan) Masahiro Kuramoto
1997	Greg Norman	Australia	1 up	(United States) Scott Hoch	(Japan) Hisayuki Sasaki	(Scotland) Sam Torrance
1998	Colin Montgomerie	Scotland	2 up	(United States) Davis Love III	(South Africa) Ernie Els	(Japan) Hajime Meshiai
