= French Senior Open =

Legends Open de France
Tournament information
- Location: Le Touquet, France
- Established: 1994
- Courses: Le Touquet Golf Resort (La Forêt Course)
- Par: 72
- Length: 6,468 yards (5,914 m)
- Tour: European Senior Tour
- Format: Stroke play
- Prize fund: €350,000
- Month played: September

Tournament record score
- Aggregate: 195 Brian Waites (1998)
- To par: −15 Adilson da Silva (2023)

Current champion
- (Scotland) Greig Hutcheon

Final champion
- Location in France Location in Hauts-de-France

Locations in France

The French Senior Open (or Open de France Senior) is a senior (over 50s) men's professional golf tournament on the European Senior Tour. In 1994 and 2004 it was played at Golf d'Omaha Beach, Port-en-Bessin, Normandy, in 1998 and 1999 it was played at Pau Golf Club, Pau, Pyrénées-Atlantiques, in 2000 it was played at Golf de Joyenval, Chambourcy near Paris and in 2007 at Golf de Divonne-les-Bains in Divonne-les-Bains, ten miles north of Geneva. The prize fund was €200,000 in 2004 and €325,000 in 2007.

After a long hiatus the event returned to the tour schedule as the Legends Open de France in 2021, played at Golf de Saint-Cloud in Paris and hosted by Jean van de Velde.

== Winners ==
Year	Winner	Score	To par	Margin of victory	Runner-up	Venue	Ref.
Legends Open de France
2024	(Scotland) Greig Hutcheon	203	−13	2 strokes	(Australia) Scott Hend (England) Simon Khan	Le Touquet	
WCM Legends Open de France
2023	(Brazil) Adilson da Silva	198	−15	3 strokes	(Sweden) Michael Jonzon	Saint-Cloud	
2022	(England) Gary Marks	204	−9	3 strokes	(Brazil) Adilson da Silva	Saint-Cloud	
Legends Open de France
2021	(France) Thomas Levet	200	−13	3 strokes	(Canada) David Morland IV	Saint-Cloud	
2008–2020: No tournament
Open de France Senior de Divonne
2007	(Spain) Juan Quirós	208	−8	1 stroke	(England) Tony Allen	Divonne-les-Bains	
2005–06: No tournament
Open de France Seniors
2004	(England) Bob Cameron	210	−6	3 strokes	(England) David J. Russell	Omaha Beach	
2001–2003: No tournament
TotalFina Elf Seniors Open
2000	(England) Nick Job	209	−7	2 strokes	(Japan) Seiji Ebihara	Joyenval	
Elf Seniors Open
1999	(United States) Alan Tapie	200	−10	3 strokes	(Republic of Ireland) Liam Higgins (Scotland) John McTear	Pau	
1998	(England) Brian Waites (2)	195	−12	4 strokes	(Republic of Ireland) Denis O'Sullivan	Pau	
1995–1997: No tournament
D Day Seniors Open
1994	(England) Brian Waites	206	−10	6 strokes	(Spain) Antonio Garrido	Omaha Beach	
