= Fubon Senior Open =

European Senior Tour men's golf tournament

Tournament information
- Location: Iaipei, Taiwan
- Established: 2011
- Courses: Miramar Golf & Country Club
- Par: 72
- Length: 6,707 yards (6,133 m)
- Tour: European Senior Tour
- Format: Stroke play
- Prize fund: US$450,000
- Month played: November
- Final year: 2013

Tournament record score
- Aggregate: 202 Tim Thelen (2012)
- To par: −14 as above

Final champion
- (England) Paul Wesselingh
- Location in Taiwan

The Fubon Senior Open was a men's golf tournament on the European Senior Tour. The tournament was held from 2011 to 2013 at Miramar Golf Country Club, north-west of New Taipei City, Taiwan. The event was co-sanctioned with the Senior PGA of Taiwan. In 2013 the prize fund was $450,000.

== Winners ==
| Year | Winner | Score | To par | Margin of victory | Runner(s)-up |
|---|---|---|---|---|---|
| 2013 | (England) Paul Wesselingh | 207 | −9 | 1 stroke | (Taiwan) Lu Wen-teh |
| 2012 | (United States) Tim Thelen | 202 | −14 | 5 strokes | (Philippines) Frankie Miñoza (South Africa) Chris Williams |
| 2011 | (Taiwan) Lu Chien-soon | 204 | −12 | 5 strokes | (United States) Lorens Chan (a) |
