= 2014 European Senior Tour =

Golf tour season

2014 European Senior Tour season
- Duration: 22 May 2014 – 14 December 2014
- Number of official events: 12
- Most wins: (Scotland) Colin Montgomerie (4)
- Order of Merit: (Scotland) Colin Montgomerie
- Rookie of the Year: (Argentina) César Monasterio

The 2014 European Senior Tour was the 23rd season of the European Senior Tour, the main professional golf tour in Europe for men aged 50 and over.

== Schedule ==
The following table lists official events during the 2014 season.

Date	Tournament	Host country	Purse (€)	Winner (Note: The number in brackets after each winner's name is the number of European Senior Tour events they had won up to and including that tournament. This information is only shown for European Senior Tour members.)	Notes
25 May	Senior PGA Championship	United States	US$2,100,000	(Scotland) Colin Montgomerie (2)	Senior major championship
8 Jun	ISPS Handa PGA Seniors Championship	England	£235,000	(Spain) Santiago Luna (2)	
6 Jul	Bad Ragaz PGA Seniors Open	Switzerland	280,000	(Canada) Rick Gibson (1)	
13 Jul	U.S. Senior Open	United States	US$2,600,000	(Scotland) Colin Montgomerie (3)	Senior major championship (Note: Official win; unofficial money.)
27 Jul	The Senior Open Championship	Wales	£1,250,000	(Germany) Bernhard Langer (4)	Senior major championship
17 Aug	SSE Scottish Senior Open	Scotland	£250,000	(England) Mark Davis (1)	
24 Aug	English Senior Open	England	£200,000	(Argentina) César Monasterio (1)	
31 Aug	Travis Perkins Masters	England	£300,000	(Scotland) Colin Montgomerie (4)	
7 Sep	Russian Open Golf Championship (Senior)	Russia	US$900,000	(Scotland) Colin Montgomerie (5)	
14 Sep	Senior Open de Portugal	Portugal	225,000	(United States) Tim Thelen (4)	New tournament
21 Sep	WINSTONgolf Senior Open	Germany	400,000	(England) Paul Wesselingh (6)	
5 Oct	French Riviera Masters	France	400,000	(England) Philip Golding (2)	
12 Oct	Dutch Senior Open	Netherlands	200,000	(Wales) Ian Woosnam (5)	
14 Dec	MCB Tour Championship	Mauritius	420,000	(England) Paul Wesselingh (7)	Tour Championship

== Order of Merit ==
The Order of Merit was based on prize money won during the season, calculated in Euros.

Position	Player	Prize money (€)
1	(Scotland) Colin Montgomerie	624,543
2	(Canada) Rick Gibson	235,804
3	(England) Barry Lane	225,288
4	(England) Philip Golding	189,117
5	(Argentina) César Monasterio	173,249

== Awards ==
Award	Winner	Ref.
Rookie of the Year	(Argentina) César Monasterio	
