= 2022 European Senior Tour =

Golf tour season

2022 European Senior Tour season
- Duration: 6 May 2022 – 11 December 2022
- Number of official events: 16
- Most wins: (Australia) Richard Green (2) (Scotland) Paul Lawrie (2)
- Order of Merit: (South Africa) James Kingston
- Rookie of the Year: (Brazil) Adilson da Silva

The 2022 European Senior Tour, titled as the 2022 Legends Tour, was the 30th season of the European Senior Tour, the main professional golf tour in Europe for men aged 50 and over.

== Schedule ==
The following table lists official events during the 2022 season.

Date	Tournament	Host country	Purse (€)	Winner (Note: The number in brackets after each winner's name is the number of European Senior Tour events they had won up to and including that tournament. This information is only shown for European Senior Tour members.)	Notes
8 May	Riegler & Partner Legends	Austria	250,000	(Scotland) Euan McIntosh (1)	
29 May	KitchenAid Senior PGA Championship	United States	US$3,500,000	(New Zealand) Steven Alker (n/a)	Senior major championship
12 Jun	Jersey Legends	Jersey	300,000	(Australia) Richard Green (1)	
19 Jun	Farmfoods European Legends Links Championship	England	250,000	(Scotland) Paul Lawrie (2)	
26 Jun	U.S. Senior Open	United States	US$4,000,000	(Republic of Ireland) Pádraig Harrington (1)	Senior major championship (Note: Official win; unofficial money.)
10 Jul	Swiss Seniors Open	Switzerland	350,000	(South Africa) James Kingston (2)	
17 Jul	WINSTONgolf Senior Open	Germany	350,000	(Australia) Richard Green (2)	
24 Jul	The Senior Open Championship	Scotland	US$2,500,000	(Northern Ireland) Darren Clarke (1)	Senior major championship
31 Jul	JCB Championship	England	600,000	(Germany) Alex Čejka (2)	New tournament
20 Aug	Irish Legends	Ireland	400,000	(Wales) Phillip Price (3)	
28 Aug	Staysure PGA Seniors Championship	England	500,000	(Brazil) Adilson da Silva (1)	
17 Sep	WCM Legends Open de France	France	250,000	(England) Gary Marks (2)	
16 Oct	Farmfoods European Senior Masters	Spain	250,000	(Scotland) Paul Lawrie (3)	
23 Oct	Italian Senior Open	Italy	300,000	(Argentina) Ricardo González (1)	
4 Dec	MCB Tour Championship (Seychelles)	Seychelles	400,000	(Sweden) Joakim Haeggman (1)	Tour Championship
11 Dec	MCB Tour Championship (Mauritius)	Mauritius	500,000	(Denmark) Thomas Bjørn (2)	Tour Championship

== Order of Merit ==
The Order of Merit was based on tournament results during the season, calculated using a points-based system.

Position	Player	Points
1	(South Africa) James Kingston	2,845
2	(Brazil) Adilson da Silva	2,253
3	(Wales) Phillip Price	1,937
4	(Scotland) Paul Lawrie	1,860
5	(Sweden) Joakim Haeggman	1,794

== Awards ==
Award	Winner	Ref.
Rookie of the Year (Barry Lane Award)	(Brazil) Adilson da Silva	
