= 2007 European Seniors Tour =

Golf tour season

2007 European Seniors Tour season
- Duration: 28 February 2007 – 10 November 2007
- Number of official events: 20
- Most wins: (England) Carl Mason (5)
- Order of Merit: (England) Carl Mason
- Rookie of the Year: (Italy) Costantino Rocca

The 2007 European Seniors Tour was the 16th season of the European Seniors Tour, the main professional golf tour in Europe for men aged 50 and over.

== Changes for 2007 ==
For the first time, the Senior PGA Championship was upgraded to an official money event on the European Seniors Tour.

== Schedule ==
The following table lists official events during the 2007 season.

Date	Tournament	Host country	Purse (€)	Winner (Note: The number in brackets after each winner's name is the number of European Seniors Tour events they had won up to and including that tournament. This information is only shown for European Seniors Tour members.)	Notes
2 Mar	DGM Barbados Open	Barbados	US$250,000	(England) Gordon J. Brand (3)	
13 May	Gloria Classic	Turkey	325,000	(England) Nick Job (4)	
20 May	Sharp Italian Seniors Open	Italy	200,000	(New Zealand) Simon Owen (2)	
27 May	Senior PGA Championship	United States	US$2,000,000	(Zimbabwe) Denis Watson (n/a)	Senior major championship
3 Jun	AIB Irish Seniors Open	Ireland	450,000	(Italy) Costantino Rocca (1)	
10 Jun	Jersey Seniors Classic	Jersey	£140,000	(South Africa) Bobby Lincoln (1)	
17 Jun	Ryder Cup Wales Seniors Open	Wales	£500,000	(England) Carl Mason (15)	
24 Jun	Bendinat London Seniors Masters	England	£150,000	(Scotland) Sam Torrance (9)	
8 Jul	U.S. Senior Open	United States	US$2,600,000	(United States) Brad Bryant (n/a)	Senior major championship (Note: Official win; unofficial money.)
14 Jul	Open de France Senior de Divonne	France	325,000	(Spain) Juan Quirós (2)	
29 Jul	The Senior Open Championship	Scotland	US$2,000,000	(United States) Tom Watson (n/a)	Senior major championship
5 Aug	Wentworth Senior Masters	England	£250,000	(Republic of Ireland) Des Smyth (2)	
12 Aug	Bad Ragaz PGA Seniors Open	Switzerland	210,000	(England) Carl Mason (16)	
19 Aug	Midas English Seniors Open	England	£150,000	(Scotland) Bill Longmuir (6)	
2 Sep	European Senior Masters	England	£225,000	(England) Carl Mason (17)	
9 Sep	PGA Seniors Championship	England	£200,000	(England) Carl Mason (18)	
22 Sep	Scandinavian Senior Open	Denmark	250,000	(Scotland) John Chillas (3)	
30 Sep	Charles Church Scottish Seniors Open	Scotland	£225,000	(Spain) José Rivero (3)	
21 Oct	OKI Castellón Open de España Senior	Spain	325,000	(England) Carl Mason (19)	
10 Nov	The Kingdom of Bahrain Trophy Seniors Tour Championship	England	US$500,000	(Italy) Costantino Rocca (2)	Tour Championship

== Order of Merit ==
The Order of Merit was based on prize money won during the season, calculated in Euros.

Position	Player	Prize money (€)
1	(England) Carl Mason	412,376
2	(Italy) Costantino Rocca	277,783
3	(Spain) Juan Quirós	235,923
4	(Australia) Stewart Ginn	224,017
5	(England) Bob Cameron	178,796

== Awards ==
Award	Winner	Ref.
Rookie of the Year	(Italy) Costantino Rocca	
