= Senior Open de Portugal =

Tournament information
- Location: Porto, Portugal
- Established: 2005
- Course: Vidago Palace
- Par: 72
- Length: 6,898 yards (6,308 m)
- Tour: European Senior Tour
- Format: Stroke play
- Prize fund: €225,000
- Month played: September
- Final year: 2014

Tournament record score
- Aggregate: 204 Carl Mason (2006); 204 Tim Thelen (2014)
- To par: −12 Tim Thelen (2014)

Final champion
- (United States) Tim Thelen
- Location in Portugal

The Senior Open de Portugal was a men's senior (over 50) professional golf tournament on the European Senior Tour. It was held just once, in September 2014, at the Hotel Palace of Vidago, Vidago, Chaves, Portugal. The winner was Tim Thelen who won the first prize of €33,750 out of total prize-money of €225,000.

== Winners ==
Year	Winner	Score	To par	Margin of victory	Runner(s)-up
Senior Open de Portugal
2014	(United States) Tim Thelen	204	−12	1 stroke	(Spain) Miguel Ángel Martín
2012–13: No tournament
Belas Clube de Campo Senior Open de Portugal
2011	(Wales) Mark Mouland	207	−9	1 stroke	(United States) Mike Cunning
2007–2010: No tournament
Estoril Seniors Open of Portugal
2006	(England) Carl Mason	204	−9	4 strokes	(Australia) Stewart Ginn (Scotland) Sam Torrance
Algarve Seniors Open of Portugal
2005	(United States) Jerry Bruner	205	−11	1 stroke	(Northern Ireland) Eddie Polland (Spain) José Rivero (Scotland) Sam Torrance
