= 2013 European Senior Tour =

Golf tour season

2013 European Senior Tour season
- Duration: 23 May 2013 – 15 December 2013
- Number of official events: 16
- Order of Merit: (England) Paul Wesselingh
- Rookie of the Year: (Denmark) Steen Tinning

The 2013 European Senior Tour was the 22nd season of the European Senior Tour, the main professional golf tour in Europe for men aged 50 and over.

== Schedule ==
The following table lists official events during the 2013 season.

Date	Tournament	Host country	Purse (€)	Winner (Note: The number in brackets after each winner's name is the number of European Senior Tour events they had won up to and including that tournament. This information is only shown for European Senior Tour members.)	Notes
26 May	Senior PGA Championship	United States	US$2,100,000	(Japan) Kōki Idoki (n/a)	Senior major championship
9 Jun	ISPS Handa PGA Seniors Championship	England	£260,000	(England) Paul Wesselingh (2)	
16 Jun	Speedy Services Wales Senior Open	Wales	£250,000	(England) Philip Golding (1)	
7 Jul	Bad Ragaz PGA Seniors Open	Switzerland	280,000	(England) Paul Wesselingh (3)	
14 Jul	U.S. Senior Open	United States	US$2,600,000	(United States) Kenny Perry (n/a)	Senior major championship (Note: Official win; unofficial money.)
28 Jul	The Senior Open Championship	England	US$2,000,000	(United States) Mark Wiebe (n/a)	Senior major championship
4 Aug	Berenberg Masters	Germany	400,000	(Denmark) Steen Tinning (1)	
18 Aug	SSE Scottish Senior Open	Scotland	£250,000	(Spain) Santiago Luna (1)	
1 Sep	Travis Perkins plc Senior Masters	England	£300,000	(Scotland) Colin Montgomerie (1)	
8 Sep	WINSTONgolf Senior Open	Germany	400,000	(Scotland) Gordon Brand Jnr (2)	
15 Sep	Russian Open Golf Championship (Senior)	Russia	US$850,000	(England) Simon P. Brown (1)	
22 Sep	French Riviera Masters	France	400,000	(Australia) Peter Fowler (3)	
6 Oct	English Senior Open	England	£200,000	(Denmark) Steen Tinning (2)	
13 Oct	Dutch Senior Open	Netherlands	200,000	(England) Simon P. Brown (2)	
17 Nov	Fubon Senior Open	Taiwan	US$450,000	(England) Paul Wesselingh (4)	
15 Dec	MCB Tour Championship	Mauritius	400,000	(England) Paul Wesselingh (5)	Tour Championship

== Order of Merit ==
The Order of Merit was based on prize money won during the season, calculated in Euros.

Position	Player	Prize money (€)
1	(England) Paul Wesselingh	311,644
2	(Denmark) Steen Tinning	206,087
3	(England) Simon P. Brown	181,493
4	(Spain) Miguel Ángel Martín	181,349
5	(Australia) Peter Fowler	174,994

== Awards ==
Award	Winner	Ref.
Rookie of the Year	(Denmark) Steen Tinning	
