= List of golfers with most European Senior Tour wins =

This is a list of all the golfers who have won five or more official events on the European Senior Tour. The list is up to date as of 28 September 2025.

Members of the World Golf Hall of Fame are indicated by H.

Rank	Player	Lifespan	Wins	Winning span
1	(England) Carl Mason	1953–	25	2003–2011
2	(England) Tommy Horton	1941–2017	23	1992–2000
3	(Scotland) Sam Torrance	1953–	11	2004–2009
4	(Wales) Brian Huggett	1936–2024	10	1992–2000
T5	(England) Neil Coles H	1934–	9	1992–2002
T5	(Germany) Bernhard Langer H	1957–	9	2008–2025
T5	(Scotland) Colin Montgomerie H	1963–	9	2013–2018
T8	(England) Peter Baker	1967–	8	2019–2025
T8	(England) Barry Lane	1960–2022	8	2010–2019
T8	(Scotland) Bill Longmuir	1953–	8	2003–2010
T8	(England) John Morgan	1943–2006	8	1994–1999
T8	(Australia) Noel Ratcliffe	1945–2024	8	1997–2005
T8	(England) Paul Wesselingh	1961–	8	2012–2015
T14	(Brazil) Adilson da Silva	1972–	7	2022–2024
T14	(Australia) Peter Fowler	1959–	7	2011–2019
T14	(Australia) Terry Gale	1946–	7	1996–2005
T17	(England) Paul Broadhurst	1965–	6	2015–2021
T17	(United States) Clark Dennis	1966–	6	2017–2024
T17	(Japan) Seiji Ebihara	1949–	6	2001–2004
T17	(Republic of Ireland) Denis O'Sullivan	1948–	6	2000–2005
T21	(England) Gordon J. Brand	1955–2020	5	2006–2008
T21	(Jamaica) Delroy Cambridge	1949–	5	2001–2009
T21	(England) Philip Golding	1962–	5	2013–2018
T21	(England) Malcolm Gregson	1943–2024	5	1994–2004
T21	(Scotland) David Huish	1944–	5	1996–2001
T21	(England) Nick Job	1949–	5	2000–2008
T21	(Thailand) Boonchu Ruangkit	1956–	5	2010–2011
T21	(Republic of Ireland) Des Smyth	1953–	5	2005–2012
T21	(United States) Tim Thelen	1961–	5	2012–2016
T21	(Wales) Ian Woosnam H	1958–	5	2008–2014
