= 2024 European Senior Tour =

Golf tour season

2024 European Senior Tour season
- Duration: 3 May 2024 – 8 December 2024
- Number of official events: 18
- Most wins: (England) Peter Baker (2) (Note: Richard Bland also won two events, but was not a European Senior Tour member.) (Brazil) Adilson da Silva (2)
- Order of Merit: (Brazil) Adilson da Silva
- Rookie of the Year: (England) Simon Griffiths

The 2024 European Senior Tour, titled as the 2024 Legends Tour, was the 32nd season of the European Senior Tour, the main professional golf tour in Europe for men aged 50 and over.

== Schedule ==
The following table lists official events during the 2024 season.

Date	Tournament	Host country	Purse (€)	Winner (Note: The number in brackets after each winner's name is the number of European Senior Tour events they had won up to and including that tournament. This information is only shown for European Senior Tour members.)	Other tours (Note: PGTI − Professional Golf Tour of India.)	Notes
5 May	Barbados Legends	Barbados	US$500,000	(England) Peter Baker (6)		
26 May	KitchenAid Senior PGA Championship	United States	US$3,500,000	(England) Richard Bland (n/a)		Senior major championship
9 Jun	Costa Navarino Legends Tour Trophy	Greece	500,000	(United States) Clark Dennis (6)		New tournament
16 Jun	Paul Lawrie Matchplay	England	300,000	(Argentina) Ángel Cabrera (1)		New tournament
22 Jun	OFX Irish Legends	Ireland	400,000	(Brazil) Adilson da Silva (6)		
1 Jul	U.S. Senior Open	United States	US$4,000,000	(England) Richard Bland (n/a)		Senior major championship
14 Jul	Swiss Seniors Open	Switzerland	300,000	(Sweden) Jarmo Sandelin (2)		
28 Jul	The Senior Open Championship	Scotland	US$2,850,000	(South Korea) K. J. Choi (n/a)		Senior major championship
4 Aug	Staysure PGA Seniors Championship	Scotland	750,000	(England) Robert Coles (1)		
18 Aug	Zambia Legends Championship	Zambia	350,000	(South Africa) Keith Horne (1)		New tournament
1 Sep	HSBC India Legends Championship	India	US$500,000	(Sweden) Joakim Haeggman (2)	PGTI	New tournament
7 Sep	Legends Open de France	France	350,000	(Scotland) Greig Hutcheon (1)		
15 Sep	European Legends Cup	Spain	800,000	(Brazil) Adilson da Silva (7)		New tournament
22 Sep	WINSTONgolf Senior Open	Germany	500,000	(England) Van Phillips (1)		
26 Oct	Sergio Melpignano Senior Italian Open	Italy	400,000	(Germany) Thomas Gögele (1)		
10 Nov	Farmfoods European Senior Masters	Spain	375,000	(England) Simon Griffiths (1)		
17 Nov	WCM Legends Mexico Open	Mexico	US$450,000	(New Zealand) Steven Alker (n/a)		New tournament
8 Dec	MCB Tour Championship	Mauritius	US$1,275,000	(England) Peter Baker (7)		Tour Championship

== Order of Merit ==
The Order of Merit was titled as the MCB Road to Mauritius and was based on tournament results during the season, calculated using a points-based system.

Position	Player	Points
1	(Brazil) Adilson da Silva	3,837
2	(England) Peter Baker	3,677
3	(Australia) Scott Hend	2,927
4	(England) Simon Griffiths	2,567
5	(Sweden) Joakim Haeggman	2,549

== Awards ==
Award	Winner	Ref.
Rookie of the Year (Barry Lane Award)	(England) Simon Griffiths	
