= 2012 European Senior Tour =

Golf tour season

2012 European Senior Tour season
- Duration: 11 May 2012 – 9 December 2012
- Number of official events: 16
- Most wins: (United States) Tim Thelen (3)
- Order of Merit: (England) Roger Chapman
- Rookie of the Year: (England) Paul Wesselingh

The 2012 European Senior Tour was the 21st season of the European Senior Tour, the main professional golf tour in Europe for men aged 50 and over.

== Schedule ==
The following table lists official events during the 2012 season.

Date	Tournament	Host country	Purse (€)	Winner (Note: The number in brackets after each winner's name is the number of European Senior Tour events they had won up to and including that tournament. This information is only shown for European Senior Tour members.)	Notes
13 May	Mallorca Open Senior	Spain	200,000	(England) Gary Wolstenholme (2)	
27 May	Senior PGA Championship	United States	US$2,000,000	(England) Roger Chapman (1)	Senior major championship
3 Jun	Benahavis Senior Masters	Spain	200,000	(England) Gary Wolstenholme (3)	
10 Jun	ISPS Handa PGA Seniors Championship	England	£250,000	(England) Paul Wesselingh (1)	
24 Jun	Van Lanschot Senior Open	Netherlands	250,000	(Japan) Masahiro Kuramoto (2)	
1 Jul	Berenberg Bank Masters	Germany	400,000	(United States) Tim Thelen (1)	
8 Jul	Bad Ragaz PGA Seniors Open	Switzerland	280,000	(United States) Tim Thelen (2)	
15 Jul	U.S. Senior Open	United States	US$2,600,000	(England) Roger Chapman (2)	Senior major championship (Note: Official win; unofficial money.)
29 Jul	The Senior Open Championship	England	US$2,000,000	(United States) Fred Couples (n/a)	Senior major championship
19 Aug	SSE Scottish Senior Open	Scotland	£250,000	(Sweden) Anders Forsbrand (1)	
26 Aug	Speedy Services Wales Senior Open	Wales	£250,000	(England) Barry Lane (4)	
2 Sep	Travis Perkins plc Senior Masters	England	£300,000	(Republic of Ireland) Des Smyth (5)	
9 Sep	Pon Senior Open	Germany	400,000	(Australia) Terry Price (1)	New tournament
23 Sep	French Riviera Masters	France	400,000	(England) David J. Russell (2)	
11 Nov	Fubon Senior Open	Taiwan	US$450,000	(United States) Tim Thelen (3)	
9 Dec	MCB Tour Championship	Mauritius	400,000	(South Africa) David Frost (2)	Tour Championship

== Order of Merit ==
The Order of Merit was based on prize money won during the season, calculated in Euros.

Position	Player	Prize money (€)
1	(England) Roger Chapman	356,751
2	(England) Barry Lane	284,636
3	(United States) Tim Thelen	251,772
4	(Australia) Peter Fowler	225,430
5	(England) Paul Wesselingh	191,663

== Awards ==
Award	Winner	Ref.
Rookie of the Year	(England) Paul Wesselingh	
