= Lu Chien-soon =

Taiwanese golfer

Personal information
- Nationality: Taiwan
- Born: 28 December 1959 (age 66) Taipei, Taiwan
- Height: 5 ft 9 in (1.75 m)
- Weight: 175 lb (79 kg; 12.5 st)

Career
- Sport: Golf
- Turned professional: 1982
- Former tours: Japan Golf Tour; Asian Tour; Asia Golf Circuit; Nationwide Tour; Champions Tour
- Professional wins: 36

Number of wins by tour
- European Senior Tour: 1
- Other: 14

Best results in major championships
- Masters Tournament: DNP
- PGA Championship: DNP
- U.S. Open: CUT: 1984
- The Open Championship: T29: 1983

Achievements and awards
- Asia Golf Circuit Order of Merit winner: 1983, 1988

Lu Chien-soon (Chinese: 盧建順, born 28 December 1959) is a Taiwanese professional golfer.

== Career ==
Lu won 20 tournaments in his native Taiwan. He also had success elsewhere in Asia, especially on the Asia Golf Circuit, where he won seven national opens between 1983 and 1989 and was the overall circuit champion twice, in 1983 and 1988. He also played on the Ben Hogan Tour (now Nationwide Tour) in 1992, where his best finish was T-5 at the Ben Hogan Louisiana Open. He played on the Japan Golf Tour in 2001, where his best finish as a member was T-11 at the NST Niigata Open Golf Championship, he had previously finished T-9 at the 1985 Golf Digest Tournament as a non-member.

After being sidelined for eight years (2001–08) with back problems, he returned to competition in 2009. He qualified for the Champions Tour via qualifying school. His best finishes are T-2 at the 2010 JELD-WEN Tradition, 2nd at the 2011 Montreal Championship and T-2 at the 2012 Regions Tradition. He won the 2011 Fubon Senior Open on the European Senior Tour.

== Professional wins (15) ==
=== Asia Golf Circuit wins (7) ===
No.	Date	Tournament	Winning score	Margin of victory	Runner(s)-up
1	13 Mar 1983	Singapore Open	−5 (71-72-70-66=279)	Playoff	(United States) Bill Brask
2	4 Mar 1984	Benson & Hedges Malaysian Open	−9 (69-69-75-72=275)	2 strokes	(Australia) Terry Gale, (Scotland) Sam Torrance
3	11 Mar 1984	Thailand Open	−10 (69-67-71-71=278)	6 strokes	(Australia) Wayne Grady
4	7 Apr 1985	Indonesia Open	−14 (67-69-72-66=274)	1 stroke	(Philippines) Frankie Miñoza
5	3 Apr 1988	Charminar Challenge Indian Open	−11 (68-68-70-75=281)	5 strokes	(United States) Kirk Triplett
6	19 Mar 1989	Singapore Open	−7 (69-69-67-72=277)	1 stroke	(Mexico) Carlos Espinosa
7	9 Apr 1989	Taiwan Open	−9 (70-69-68=207) (Note: Shortened to 54 holes due to weather.)	1 stroke	(Taiwan) Chen Liang-hsi

Asia Golf Circuit playoff record (1–0)

No.	Year	Tournament	Opponent	Result
1	1983	Singapore Open	(United States) Bill Brask	Won with birdie on second extra hole

=== Asian Development Tour wins (1) ===
No.	Date	Tournament	Winning score	Margin of victory	Runner-up
1	23 Nov 2012	Yeangder ADT^{1}	−19 (66-63-68=197)	5 strokes	(Taiwan) Lin Wen-tang

^{1}Co-sanctioned by the Taiwan PGA Tour

=== ASEAN PGA Tour wins (1) ===
No.	Date	Tournament	Winning score	Margin of victory	Runner-up
1	18 Jul 2009	Mercedes-Benz Masters Malaysia	−11 (68-68-70-71=277)	Playoff	(Philippines) Antonio Lascuña

=== Other Asian wins (4) ===
- 1985 HP Open
- 1989 Rolex Masters (Singapore)
- 1990 Kaohsiung Open
- 1998 Taiwan Open

=== European Senior Tour wins (1) ===
No.	Date	Tournament	Winning score	Margin of victory	Runner-up
1	20 Nov 2011	Fubon Senior Open	−12 (64-71-69=204)	5 strokes	(United States) Lorens Chan (a)

=== Japan PGA Senior Tour wins (1) ===
- 2017 Japan PGA Senior Championship

== Team appearances ==
Professional

- Dunhill Cup (representing Taiwan): 1989
- World Cup (representing Taiwan): 1989, 1994
