= Pedro Linhart =

Spanish professional golfer

Personal information
- Full name: Pedro Linhart
- Nationality: Spain
- Born: 30 December 1962 (age 63) Las Palmas, Canary Islands, Spain
- Height: 1.75 m (5 ft 9 in)
- Weight: 70 kg (150 lb; 11 st)
- Spouse: Fatima (m. 2004)
- Children: 2

Career
- Sport: Golf
- Turned professional: 1982
- Current tour: European Senior Tour
- Former tour: European Tour
- Professional wins: 4

Number of wins by tour
- European Tour: 1
- Challenge Tour: 1
- European Senior Tour: 1
- Other: 1

Best results in major championships
- Masters Tournament: DNP
- PGA Championship: DNP
- U.S. Open: DNP
- The Open Championship: 103rd: 1995

Pedro Linhart (born 30 December 1962) is a Spanish professional golfer.

== Career ==
Linhart was born Las Palmas, Gran Canaria, Spain to American parents, and took up Spanish citizenship in the 1980s. He turned professional in 1982, and after a failed visit to European Tour qualifying school in 1986 he spent time working as an assistant pro in New Jersey and playing on the mini-tour circuit in the United States.

Linhart won a European Tour card at his second attempt and was a rookie on the tour in 1994. In 1995 he won the Canarias Challenge, a Challenge Tour event, on the islands of his birth. In 1999 he won the Madeira Island Open on the main European tour, but he suffered a wrist injury in 2000 and was unable to build on this success. In 2007, Pedro finished 2nd in the Qualifying School for the European Tour, and therefore regained his card.

== Professional wins (4) ==
=== European Tour wins (1) ===
No.	Date	Tournament	Winning score	Margin of victory	Runner-up
1	28 Mar 1999	Madeira Island Open	−12 (70-64-71-71=276)	1 stroke	(England) Mark James

=== Challenge Tour wins (1) ===
No.	Date	Tournament	Winning score	Margin of victory	Runner-up
1	30 Apr 1995	Canarias Challenge	−9 (67-67-69-72=275)	1 stroke	(Spain) Ignacio Feliu

=== Alps Tour wins (1) ===
No.	Date	Tournament	Winning score	Margin of victory	Runners-up
1	18 Apr 2009	Peugeot Loewe Tour La Llorea	−16 (68-68-64=200)	4 strokes	(Italy) Matteo Delpodio, (England) Steve Lewton, (Spain) Juan Quirós

=== European Senior Tour wins (1) ===
No.	Date	Tournament	Winning score	Margin of victory	Runner-up
1	12 Jul 2015	WINSTONgolf Senior Open	−16 (70-64-66=200)	3 strokes	(England) Barry Lane

== Results in major championships ==
Tournament	1995	1996	1997	1998	1999
The Open Championship	103				CUT

Note: Linhart only played in The Open Championship.

Did not play

CUT = missed the half-way cut

== See also ==
- 2007 European Tour Qualifying School graduates
