= David Frost (golfer) =

South African professional golfer (born 1959)

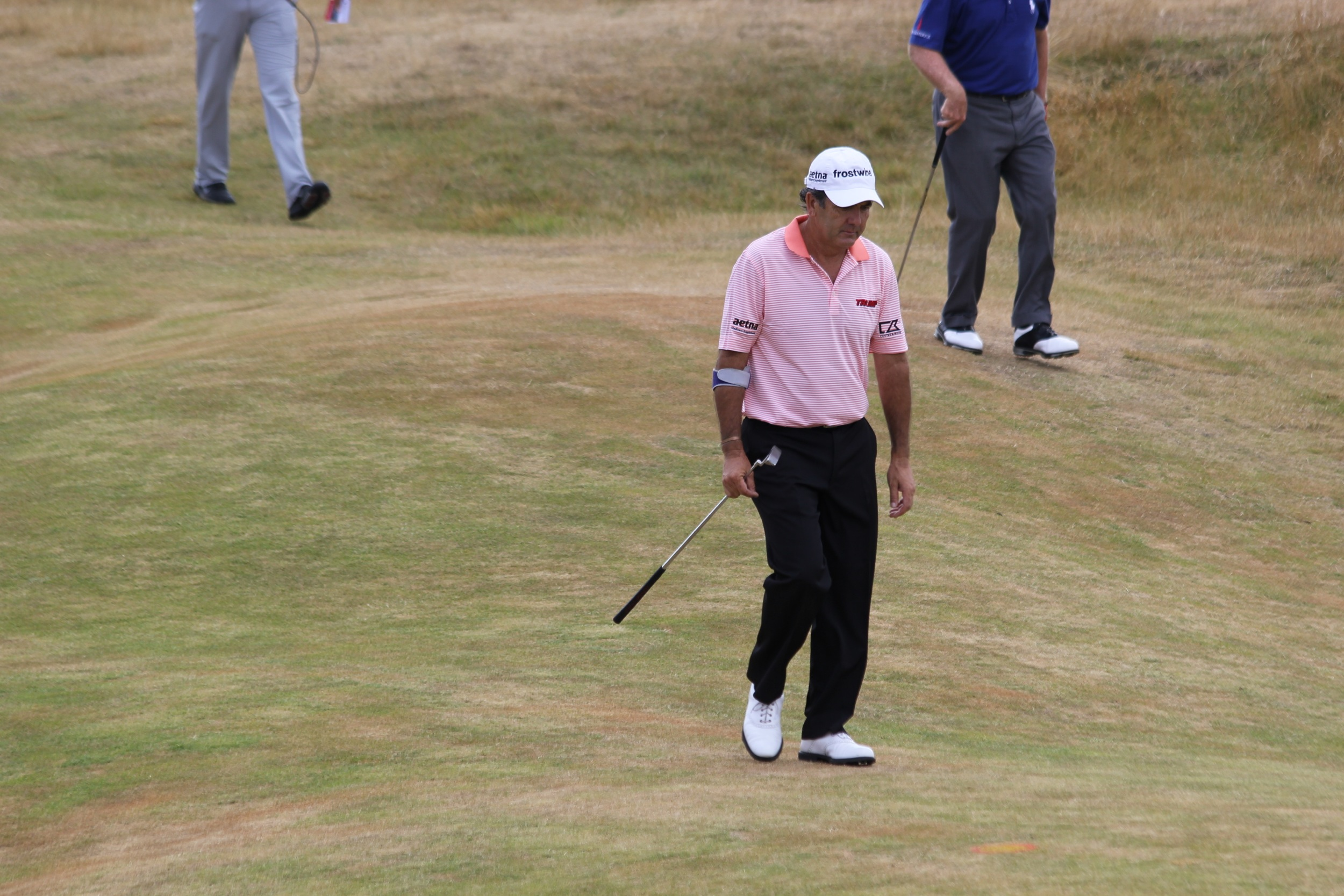
- Frost in 2013

Personal information
- Full name: David Laurence Frost
- Nickname: Frosty
- Nationality: South Africa
- Born: 11 September 1959 (age 67) Cape Town, Cape Province, Union of South Africa
- Height: 1.80 m (5 ft 11 in)
- Weight: 92 kg (203 lb; 14.5 st)
- Children: 2

Career
- Sport: Golf
- Turned professional: 1981
- Current tour: PGA Tour Champions
- Former tours: PGA Tour; European Tour; Sunshine Tour; European Senior Tour
- Professional wins: 29
- Highest ranking: 6 (20 November 1988)

Number of wins by tour
- PGA Tour: 10
- European Tour: 2
- Japan Golf Tour: 1
- Asian Tour: 1
- Sunshine Tour: 5
- PGA Tour Champions: 6
- European Senior Tour: 2
- Other: 3

Best results in major championships
- Masters Tournament: T5: 1995
- PGA Championship: T10: 1987
- U.S. Open: T15: 1986
- The Open Championship: 6th: 1987

Achievements and awards
- Byron Nelson Award: 1987
- Southern Africa Tour Order of Merit winner: 1998–99

David Laurence Frost (born 11 September 1959) is a South African professional golfer who was ranked in the top 10 of the Official World Golf Ranking in the late 1980s and early 1990s. Frost has 29 professional tournament wins to his name, spread across four continents, including the World Series of Golf, South African Open, Nedbank Million Dollar Challenge and Canadian Open. He has also been on the winning Alfred Dunhill Cup team and played in the Presidents Cup.

== Early life ==
Frost was born in Cape Town, South Africa and graduated from Paarl Boys' High School in 1977. He used to be a cigarette salesman.

== Professional career ==
In 1981, he turned professional. Frost scored his first professional win in his home country in 1983 and has continued to play in South Africa in the northern winter, but like other leading South African golfers he has spent far more time playing internationally.

In line with many other Commonwealth golfers, his first move abroad was to the European Tour and he played that tour from 1982 to 1984. South Africa was temporarily a republic outside the Commonwealth from 31 May 1961 to 31 May 1994 when he was playing in the early part of his career.

From 1985, he was primarily on the U.S.-based PGA Tour. He moved to Miami, Florida. In 1989, he won the NEC World Series of Golf, defeating Ben Crenshaw at the second playoff hole. He made the top ten on the PGA Tour money list twice, placing 9th in 1988 and 5th in 1993 and was ranked in the top 10 of the Official World Golf Rankings for 86 weeks between 1988 and 1994. By his forties, he was no longer a regular contender on the tour, but in 2005 he set the all time PGA Tour 72-hole putting record with 92 putts at the MCI Heritage.

In 2007, Frost re-established his career on the European Tour aiming on the senior tour when turning 50.

In June 2013, Frost won his maiden senior major championship at the 2013 Regions Tradition. He won by a single stroke over Fred Couples to claim his first major title in his 17th attempt. It was also his fifth career victory on the Champions Tour. In March 2015, Frost won his sixth Champions Tour title at the Mississippi Gulf Resort Classic by a single stroke over Tom Lehman and Kevin Sutherland.

Frost won the Sunshine Tour Order of Merit in 1998/99. He was a member of the International Team in the first staging of the Presidents Cup in 1994, and took part again in 1996. In both 1997 and 1998 he captained South Africa to victory in the Alfred Dunhill Cup at the Old Course in St Andrews, Scotland. His teammates were Ernie Els and Retief Goosen on both occasions.

== Private life ==
The son of a vintner himself, Frost owns a winery in the Western Cape, South Africa, which produces vintages named after golf legends such as Jack Nicklaus and the late Arnold Palmer.

== Professional wins (29) ==
=== PGA Tour wins (10) ===
No.	Date	Tournament	Winning score	Margin of victory	Runner(s)-up
1	2 Oct 1988	Southern Open	−10 (70-68-65-67=270)	Playoff	(United States) Bob Tway
2	6 Nov 1988	Northern Telecom Tucson Open	−22 (66-66-67-67=266)	5 strokes	(United States) Mark Calcavecchia, (United States) Mark O'Meara
3	27 Aug 1989	NEC World Series of Golf	−4 (70-68-69-69=276)	Playoff	(United States) Ben Crenshaw
4	29 Apr 1990	USF&G Classic	−12 (71-70-66-69=276)	1 stroke	(Australia) Greg Norman
5	28 Jun 1992	Buick Classic	−16 (67-68-67-66=268)	8 strokes	(United States) Duffy Waldorf
6	20 Sep 1992	Hardee's Golf Classic	−14 (62-68-64-72=266)	3 strokes	(United States) Tom Lehman, (United States) Loren Roberts
7	12 Sep 1993	Canadian Open	−9 (72-70-69-68=279)	1 stroke	(United States) Fred Couples
8	19 Sep 1993	Hardee's Golf Classic (2)	−21 (68-63-64-64=259)	7 strokes	(United States) Payne Stewart, (United States) D. A. Weibring
9	26 Jun 1994	Canon Greater Hartford Open	−12 (65-68-66-69=268)	1 stroke	(Australia) Greg Norman
10	25 May 1997	MasterCard Colonial	−15 (66-63-69-67=265)	2 strokes	(United States) Brad Faxon, (United States) David Ogrin

PGA Tour playoff record (2–3)

No.	Year	Tournament	Opponent(s)	Result
1	1986	Western Open	(United States) Fred Couples, (United States) Tom Kite, (Zimbabwe) Nick Price	Kite won with birdie on first extra hole
2	1988	Manufacturers Hanover Westchester Classic	(Spain) Seve Ballesteros, (United States) Ken Green, (Australia) Greg Norman	Ballesteros won with birdie on first extra hole
3	1988	Southern Open	(United States) Bob Tway	Won with birdie on first extra hole
4	1989	NEC World Series of Golf	(United States) Ben Crenshaw	Won with par on second extra hole
5	1995	MCI Classic	(United States) Nolan Henke, (United States) Bob Tway	Tway won with par on second extra hole Frost eliminated by par on first hole

=== European Tour wins (2) ===
No.	Date	Tournament	Winning score	Margin of victory	Runners-up
1	21 Oct 1984	Compagnie de Chauffe Cannes Open	−8 (72-72-68-68=280)	2 strokes	(Scotland) Gordon Brand Jnr, (England) John Morgan
2	24 Jan 1999	Mercedes-Benz - Vodacom South African Open^{1}	−5 (69-69-73-68=279)	1 stroke	(United States) Scott Dunlap, (India) Jeev Milkha Singh

^{1}Co-sanctioned by the Southern Africa Tour

European Tour playoff record (0–1)

No.	Year	Tournament	Opponent	Result
1	1997	Alfred Dunhill South African PGA Championship	(Zimbabwe) Nick Price	Lost to par on first extra hole

=== PGA of Japan Tour wins (1) ===
No.	Date	Tournament	Winning score	Margin of victory	Runner-up
1	22 Nov 1992	Dunlop Phoenix Tournament	−11 (72-69-69-67=277)	Playoff	(Japan) Kiyoshi Murota

PGA of Japan Tour playoff record (1–0)

No.	Year	Tournament	Opponent	Result
1	1992	Dunlop Phoenix Tournament	(Japan) Kiyoshi Murota	Won with par on second extra hole

=== Asia Golf Circuit wins (1) ===
No.	Date	Tournament	Winning score	Margin of victory	Runner-up
1	27 Feb 1994	Kent Hong Kong Open	−10 (69-69-69-67=274)	Playoff	(United States) Craig McClellan

Asia Golf Circuit playoff record (1–0)

No.	Year	Tournament	Opponent	Result
1	1994	Kent Hong Kong Open	(United States) Craig McClellan	Won with par on first extra hole

=== Southern Africa Tour wins (5) ===
Legend
Flagship events (1)
Other Southern Africa Tour (4)

No.	Date	Tournament	Winning score	Margin of victory	Runner(s)-up
1	15 Jan 1983	Gordon's Gin Classic	−8 (71-70=68-71=280)	5 strokes	(Zimbabwe) Nick Price
2	8 Feb 1986	Southern Suns South African Open	−13 (72-70-66-67=275)	3 strokes	(Zimbabwe) Tony Johnstone
3	12 Dec 1987	Safmarine South African Masters	−15 (70-67-70-66=273)	3 strokes	(England) Denis Durnian
4	16 Jan 1994	Lexington PGA Championship	−21 (64-67-65-63=259)	7 strokes	(Zimbabwe) Nick Price
5	24 Jan 1999	Mercedes-Benz - Vodacom South African Open^{1} (2)	−5 (69-69-73-68=279)	1 stroke	(United States) Scott Dunlap, (India) Jeev Milkha Singh

^{1}Co-sanctioned by the European Tour

Southern Africa Tour playoff record (0–1)

No.	Year	Tournament	Opponent	Result
1	1997	Alfred Dunhill South African PGA Championship	(Zimbabwe) Nick Price	Lost to par on first extra hole

=== Other wins (3) ===
No.	Date	Tournament	Winning score	Margin of victory	Runner-up
1	10 Dec 1989	Nedbank Million Dollar Challenge	−12 (67-66-75-68=276)	3 strokes	(United States) Scott Hoch
2	9 Dec 1990	Nedbank Million Dollar Challenge (2)	−4 (71-71-71-71=284)	1 stroke	(Spain) José María Olazábal
3	6 Dec 1992	Nedbank Million Dollar Challenge (3)	−12 (70-69-68-69=276)	4 strokes	(United States) John Cook

Other playoff record (0–1)

No.	Year	Tournament	Opponents	Result
1	2000	Fred Meyer Challenge (with (United States) Jim Furyk)	(United States) John Cook and (United States) Mark O'Meara	Lost to birdie on first extra hole

=== Champions Tour wins (6) ===
Legend
Champions Tour major championships (1)
Other Champions Tour (5)

No.	Date	Tournament	Winning score	Margin of victory	Runner(s)-up
1	8 Aug 2010	3M Championship	−25 (64-66-61=191)	7 strokes	(United States) Mark Calcavecchia
2	22 Apr 2012	Liberty Mutual Legends of Golf (with (United States) Michael Allen)	−29 (62-63-62=187)	1 stroke	(United States) John Cook and (United States) Joey Sindelar
3	28 Oct 2012	AT&T Championship	−8 (71-71-66=208)	Playoff	(Germany) Bernhard Langer
4	17 Mar 2013	Toshiba Classic	−19 (63-66-65=194)	5 strokes	(United States) Fred Couples
5	9 Jun 2013	Regions Tradition	−16 (68-70-66-68=272)	1 stroke	(United States) Fred Couples
6	29 Mar 2015	Mississippi Gulf Resort Classic	−10 (68-70-68=206)	1 stroke	(United States) Tom Lehman, (United States) Kevin Sutherland

Champions Tour playoff record (1–2)

No.	Year	Tournament	Opponent(s)	Result
1	2010	Senior PGA Championship	(United States) Fred Couples, (United States) Tom Lehman	Lehman won with par on first extra hole
2	2012	AT&T Championship	(Germany) Bernhard Langer	Won with birdie on second extra hole
3	2013	Mitsubishi Electric Championship at Hualalai	(United States) John Cook	Lost to birdie on second extra hole

=== European Senior Tour wins (2) ===
Legend
Tour Championships (1)
Other European Senior Tour (1)

No.	Date	Tournament	Winning score	Margin of victory	Runner(s)-up
1	12 Dec 2010 (2011 season)	Mauritius Commercial Bank Open	−13 (70-64-69=203)	Playoff	(England) Roger Chapman
2	9 Dec 2012	MCB Tour Championship (2)	−11 (64-67-74=205)	1 stroke	(Australia) Peter Fowler, (England) Barry Lane

European Senior Tour playoff record (1–1)

No.	Year	Tournament	Opponent(s)	Result
1	2010	Senior PGA Championship	(United States) Fred Couples, (United States) Tom Lehman	Lehman won with birdie on first extra hole
2	2010	Mauritius Commercial Bank Open	(England) Roger Chapman	Won with par on second extra hole

== Results in major championships ==
Tournament	1983	1984	1985	1986	1987	1988	1989
Masters Tournament					T45	8	T18
U.S. Open			T23	T15	T17	CUT	T18
The Open Championship	CUT	T47	T25	CUT	6	T7	CUT
PGA Championship			CUT	T21	T10	CUT	T27

Tournament	1990	1991	1992	1993	1994	1995	1996	1997	1998	1999
Masters Tournament	CUT	T32		CUT	T35	T5	T10	37	T26	
U.S. Open	T33	CUT		CUT	CUT	CUT	CUT			
The Open Championship	CUT	CUT		T24	T51	T31	T41	CUT	T44	T7
PGA Championship	T31	T48	T73	CUT	T25	T67	CUT	CUT	T56	T21

Tournament	2000	2001	2002	2003	2004	2005	2006	2007	2008	2009	2010
Masters Tournament											
U.S. Open	CUT		CUT								CUT
The Open Championship	T55	CUT				T15		CUT	T51		
PGA Championship											

Top 10
Did not play

CUT = missed the half-way cut
"T" = tied

=== Summary ===
Tournament	Wins	2nd	3rd	Top-5	Top-10	Top-25	Events	Cuts made
Masters Tournament	0	0	0	1	3	4	11	9
U.S. Open	0	0	0	0	0	4	14	5
The Open Championship	0	0	0	0	3	5	21	13
PGA Championship	0	0	0	0	1	4	15	10
Totals	0	0	0	1	7	17	61	37

- Most consecutive cuts made – 6 (1986 PGA – 1988 Masters)
- Longest streak of top-10s – 3 (1987 Open Championship – 1988 Masters)

== Results in The Players Championship ==
Tournament	1986	1987	1988	1989
The Players Championship	T48	T15	T3	T8

Tournament	1990	1991	1992	1993	1994	1995	1996	1997	1998	1999
The Players Championship	CUT	T41	CUT	CUT	CUT	T37	T17	WD	T42	T52

Tournament	2000	2001	2002	2003	2004
The Players Championship	T57		75		CUT

Top 10
Did not play

CUT = missed the halfway cut
WD = withdrew
"T" indicates a tie for a place

== Results in World Golf Championships ==
Tournament	1999
Match Play	
Championship	T59
Invitational	

Did not play

"T" = Tied

== Senior major championships ==
=== Wins (1) ===
Year	Championship	54 holes	Winning score	Margin	Runner-up
2013	Regions Tradition	1 shot lead	−16 (68-70-66-68=272)	1 stroke	(United States) Fred Couples

=== Results timeline ===
Results not in chronological order before 2022.

Tournament	2009	2010	2011	2012	2013	2014	2015	2016	2017	2018	2019	2020	2021	2022	2023	2024
The Tradition	–	T21	11	T18	1	T25	T34	T17	T34	67	T22	NT	T66	T57	T63	T67
Senior PGA Championship	–	T2	T22	T4		T5	T58	T7	CUT	T18	T12	NT	CUT	T55		CUT
U.S. Senior Open	–	62	DQ	WD	T20	T3	T33	T9	T18	T24		NT				
Senior Players Championship	T24	T25	T55	T28	T27	T15	T59	T13	T35	T59	T54	T62	T58	T59		
Senior British Open Championship	–	T14	6	T15	T3	T21	T67	T14	13	T64	T7	NT	T70	T41		

Win
Top 10
Did not play

CUT = missed the halfway cut
WD = withdrew
DQ = disqualified
"T" indicates a tie for a place
NT = no tournament due to COVID-19 pandemic

== Team appearances ==
Professional

- Hennessy Cognac Cup (representing the Rest of the World): 1984
- Alfred Dunhill Cup (representing South Africa): 1991, 1992, 1993, 1994, 1995, 1997 (winners), 1998 (winners), 1999, 2000
- Presidents Cup (International Team): 1994, 1996
- World Cup (representing South Africa): 1998, 1999
- Alfred Dunhill Challenge (representing Southern Africa): 1995 (winners)

== See also ==
- 1984 PGA Tour Qualifying School graduates
