= Philip Golding =

English golfer

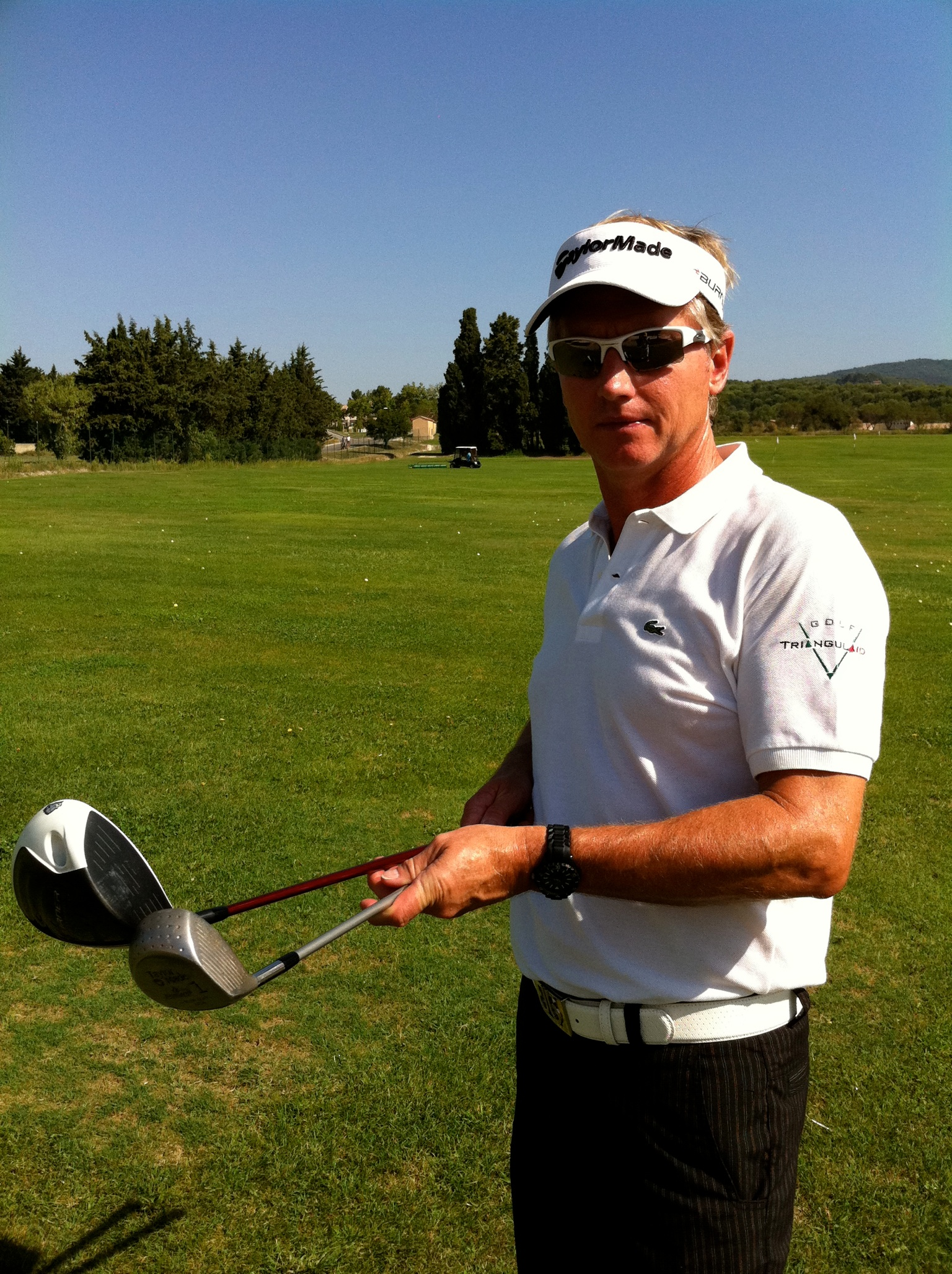

Personal information
- Full name: Philip Keith Golding
- Nationality: England
- Born: 25 July 1962 (age 64) Luton, Bedfordshire, England
- Height: 5 ft 11 in (1.80 m)

Career
- Sport: Golf
- Turned professional: 1981
- Current tours: European Senior Tour; Champions Tour
- Former tour: European Tour
- Professional wins: 10

Number of wins by tour
- European Tour: 1
- Challenge Tour: 3
- European Senior Tour: 5
- Other: 1

Best results in major championships
- Masters Tournament: DNP
- PGA Championship: DNP
- U.S. Open: DNP
- The Open Championship: CUT: 2000, 2003

Philip Keith Golding (born 25 July 1962) is an English professional golfer.

== Career ==
Golding was born in Luton, Bedfordshire. He was a promising cricketer who played for Middlesex Colts before he took up golf at the age of 17. He turned professional in 1981, becoming an assistant at his local golf club.

Golding has been a regular fixture at the European Tour's qualifying school, where in 2007 he stretched his record to 18 appearances. He has often won a tour card, but up to the age of forty he had never done well enough on the Tour to retain his card automatically.

In 2003 Golding won the Open de France, one of Europe's most prestigious events, on his 201st tour start. His prize of €416,660 was more than twice as much as he had ever won in a complete season before that year, and he went on to finish the season in a career best 32nd place on the Order of Merit. After falling away again in 2004 he had a solid season in 2005, with a pair of top ten finishes, but he has struggled since, returning to qualifying school again in 2006 and 2007. In 2008, he was again unable to retain his place on the elite tour, and dropped back down to the second tier Challenge Tour for 2009.

Having been a past winner of the Open de France, Golding had an exemption to play on the European Senior Tour from his 50th birthday in mid-2012. Golding won on the European Senior Tour for the first time in August 2013 when he took the Speedy Services Wales Senior Open. He won for a second time the following season at the French Riviera Masters and had two more wins in 2017, in the Swiss Seniors Open and the Travis Perkins Masters. In 2018 he had his biggest senior success, winning the Staysure PGA Seniors Championship.

== Professional wins (10) ==
=== European Tour wins (1) ===
No.	Date	Tournament	Winning score	Margin of victory	Runner-up
1	29 Jun 2003	Open de France	−15 (66-70-68-69=273)	1 stroke	(England) David Howell

=== Challenge Tour wins (3) ===
No.	Date	Tournament	Winning score	Margin of victory	Runner-up
1	9 Sep 1990	Brussels Pro-Am	−4 (71-71-70=212)		(France) Tim Planchin
2	7 Aug 1993	Rolex Pro-Am	−13 (65-66-71-73=275)	3 strokes	(Sweden) Olle Nordberg
3	4 Jul 1999	Open des Volcans	−18 (67-68-69-66=270)	2 strokes	(New Zealand) Stephen Scahill

=== Other wins (1) ===
- 1996 Mauritius Open

=== European Senior Tour wins (5) ===
No.	Date	Tournament	Winning score	Margin of victory	Runner(s)-up
1	16 Jun 2013	Speedy Services Wales Senior Open	−2 (66-79-66=211)	2 strokes	(England) David J. Russell
2	5 Oct 2014	French Riviera Masters	−15 (64-67-70=201)	4 strokes	(Argentina) César Monasterio
3	9 Jul 2017	Swiss Seniors Open	−15 (67-65-63=195)	1 stroke	(Republic of Ireland) Mark McNulty
4	3 Sep 2017	Travis Perkins Masters	−5 (70-71-70=211)	1 stroke	(United States) Clark Dennis, (Republic of Ireland) Brendan McGovern
5	5 Aug 2018	Staysure PGA Seniors Championship	−18 (72-67-68-63=270)	2 strokes	(Sweden) Magnus Persson Atlevi

European Senior Tour playoff record (0–1)

No.	Year	Tournament	Opponents	Result
1	2014	WINSTONgolf Senior Open	(Germany) Bernhard Langer, (England) Paul Wesselingh	Wesselingh won with birdie on third extra hole Golding eliminated by par on second hole

== Results in major championships ==
Tournament	2000	2001	2002	2003
The Open Championship	CUT			CUT

Did not play

CUT = missed the halfway cut
Note: Golding only played in The Open Championship.

== Results in World Golf Championships ==
Tournament	2003
Match Play	
Championship	
Invitational	T61

Did not play

"T" = Tied

== See also ==
- 2007 European Tour Qualifying School graduates
- List of golfers with most European Senior Tour wins
