= Juan Quirós =

Spanish professional golfer (born 1956)

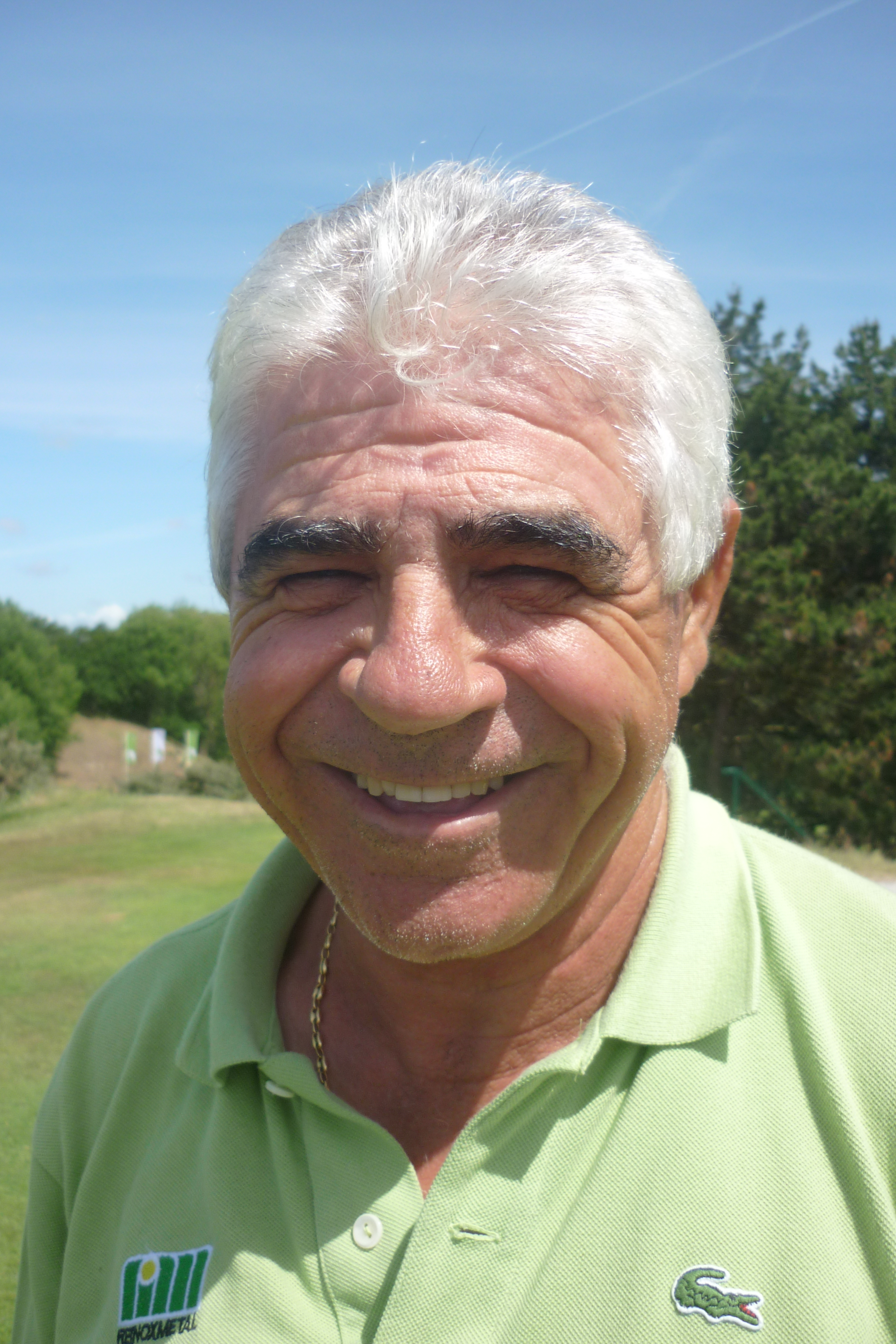

Personal information
- Full name: Juan Quirós Segura
- Nationality: Spain
- Born: 25 February 1956 (age 70) La Linea, Spain
- Height: 1.69 m (5 ft 7 in)

Career
- Sport: Golf
- Turned professional: 1974
- Current tour: European Senior Tour
- Former tour: European Tour
- Professional wins: 19

Number of wins by tour
- Challenge Tour: 1
- European Senior Tour: 4
- Other: 14

Juan Quirós Segura (born 25 February 1956) is a Spanish professional golfer.

== Career ==
Quirós was born in La Linea, Andalusia in 1956. He played on the European Tour most seasons from 1983 to 2000, making the top-100 on the Order of Merit three times. His best tournament finish was as joint runner-up in the 1994 Turespana Open de Tenerife.

After turning 50 in early 2006, Quirós joined the European Seniors Tour, and he won that year's Bad Ragaz PGA Seniors Open by two strokes. He followed that by winning the 2007 French Senior Open and 2008 Irish Seniors Open.

== Professional wins (19) ==
=== Challenge Tour wins (1) ===
No.	Date	Tournament	Winning score	Margin of victory	Runners-up
1	30 Jun 1996	Memorial Olivier Barras	−8 (64-68-73=205)	5 strokes	(Switzerland) Dimitri Bieri, (England) Matthew Hazelden

=== Other wins (13) ===
- 1988 Larios Open
- 1994 Neguri Open
- 1996 II Torneo Circuito Nacional Profesional, III Torneo Circuito Nacional Profesional,
- 1997 III Torneo Circuito Nacional Profesional
- 1998 VI Torneo Circuito Profesional RFEG/APG
- 2000 Campeonato de España A.P.G., Campeonato Cataluña de Profesionales
- 2001 Campeonato Peugeot OKI de Vigo, Campeonato Peugeot OKI de Málaga, Peugeot OKI Pro-Am Gran Final
- 2003 Campeonato OKI Pro-Am
- 2004 Campeonato Peugeot Oliva

=== European Senior Tour wins (4) ===
No.	Date	Tournament	Winning score	Margin of victory	Runner-up
1	13 Aug 2006	Bad Ragaz PGA Seniors Open	−14 (70-61-65=196)	2 strokes	(England) Carl Mason
2	14 Jul 2007	Open de France Senior de Divonne	−8 (69-69-70=208)	1 stroke	(England) Tony Allen
3	22 Jun 2008	Irish Seniors Open	−1 (71-69-72=212)	1 stroke	(Republic of Ireland) Des Smyth
4	24 Sep 2011	Cannes Mougins Masters	−10 (69-68-69=206)	Playoff	(Republic of Ireland) Des Smyth

European Senior Tour playoff record (1–0)

No.	Year	Tournament	Opponent	Result
1	2011	Cannes Mougins Masters	(Republic of Ireland) Des Smyth	Won with birdie on second extra hole

=== Other senior wins (1) ===
- 2008 Campeonato de Andalucía de Profesionales
