= David J. Russell (golfer) =

English golfer (born 1954)

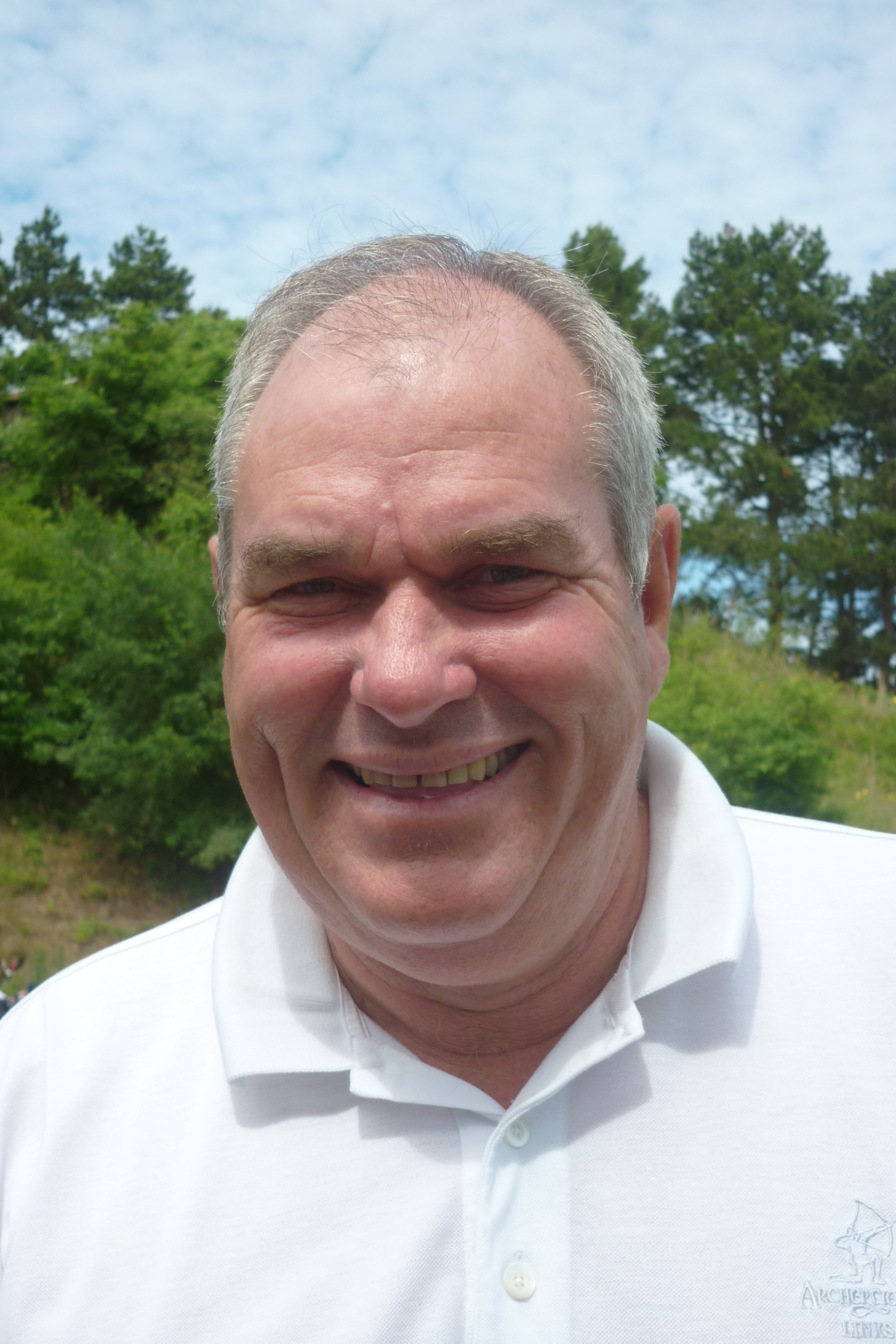
- Russell at the 2010 Dutch Seniors Open

Personal information
- Full name: David John Russell
- Nationality: England
- Born: 2 May 1954 (age 72) Birmingham, England
- Height: 6 ft 1 in (1.85 m)
- Weight: 224 lb (102 kg; 16.0 st)
- Spouse: Krystyna Russell
- Children: 2

Career
- Sport: Golf
- Turned professional: 1973
- Current tour: European Senior Tour
- Former tour: European Tour
- Professional wins: 7

Number of wins by tour
- European Tour: 2
- European Senior Tour: 2
- Other: 3

Best results in major championships
- Masters Tournament: DNP
- PGA Championship: DNP
- U.S. Open: DNP
- The Open Championship: T11: 1988

David John Russell (born 2 May 1954) is an English professional golfer.

== Career ==
Russell was born in Birmingham, grew up in Bromsgrove and was educated at North Bromsgrove High School. He turned professional in 1973 and spent many years on the European Tour, making the top one hundred on the Order or Merit twelve times between 1979 and 1992, with a best ranking of 24th in 1985. His two European Tour wins came at the 1985 Car Care Plan International and the 1992 Lyon Open V33. In which he won playing the entire 72 holes without dropping a single shot

He retired from the European Tour to become the Club Professional at Kedleston Park Golf Club in 1996-2002.

In 2001, he designed and set up Archerfield Links in East Lothian where he still resides.

Russell joined the European Senior Tour on turning fifty and finished as runner-up in each of his first two senior tournaments. In 2005, in his first full season on the European Senior Tour, he had three more runner-up finishes and ended the season 8th place on the Order of Merit. In June 2010, he won his first title at the De Vere Collection PGA Seniors Championship.

Russell was selected by 2006 European Ryder Cup captain Ian Woosnam to be one of his assistants at the K Club.

Russell is a European Tour Board Member and is the European Senior Tour Chairman.

Russell's middle initial is almost always quoted in order to distinguish him from another English European Tour golfer of the same name, David A. Russell, who is three years younger.

== Professional wins (7) ==
=== European Tour wins (2) ===
No.	Date	Tournament	Winning score	Margin of victory	Runner-up
1	12 May 1985	Car Care Plan International	+1 (71-67-68-71=277)	1 stroke	(England) Carl Mason
2	21 Jun 1992	Lyon Open V33	−21 (68-66-67-66=267)	6 strokes	(Australia) Brett Ogle

European Tour playoff record (0–1)

No.	Year	Tournament	Opponents	Result
1	1983	Paco Rabanne Open de France	(Spain) José María Cañizares, (England) Nick Faldo	Faldo won with par on third extra hole Russell eliminated by birdie on first hole

=== Other wins (2) ===
- 1994 Tournoi Perrier de Paris (with Peter Baker)
- 2012 Farmfoods British Par 3 Championship

=== European Senior Tour wins (2) ===
No.	Date	Tournament	Winning score	Margin of victory	Runner(s)-up
1	27 Jun 2010	De Vere Collection PGA Seniors Championship	−5 (71-67-70-75=283)	2 strokes	(Paraguay) Ángel Franco, (England) Barry Lane, (South Africa) Chris Williams
2	23 Sep 2012	French Riviera Masters	−8 (69-74-65=208)	Playoff	(United States) Tim Thelen

European Senior Tour playoff record (1–1)

No.	Year	Tournament	Opponent	Result
1	2006	DGM Barbados Open	(Spain) José Rivero	Lost to birdie on fourth extra hole
2	2012	French Riviera Masters	(United States) Tim Thelen	Won with par on third extra hole

=== Japan PGA Senior Tour wins (1) ===
- 2012 Fuji Film Senior Championship

== Results in major championships ==
Tournament	1973	1974	1975	1976	1977	1978	1979
The Open Championship	CUT	CUT			CUT	CUT	CUT

Tournament	1980	1981	1982	1983	1984	1985	1986	1987	1988	1989
The Open Championship		CUT	T35	CUT	T55				T11	CUT

Tournament	1990	1991	1992	1993	1994	1995	1996
The Open Championship							CUT

Note: Russell only played in The Open Championship.

Did not play

CUT = missed the half-way cut (3rd round cut in 1973 and 1974 Open Championships)
"T" = tied
