= Barry Lane =

English professional golfer (1960–2022)

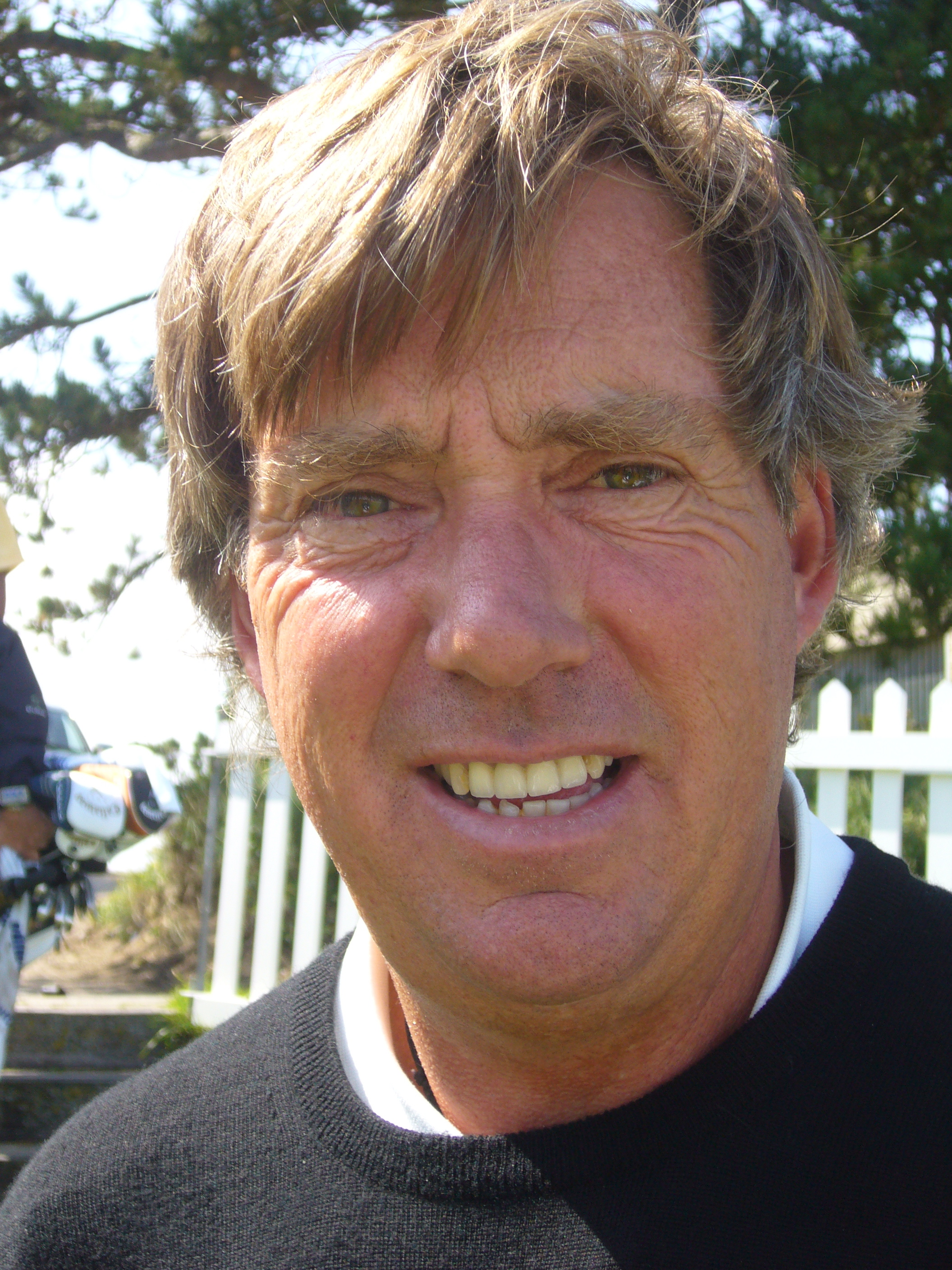
- Lane in 2008

Personal information
- Full name: Barry Douglas Lane
- Nationality: England
- Born: 21 June 1960 Hayes, Middlesex, England
- Died: 31 December 2022 (aged 62)
- Height: 5 ft 10 in (1.78 m)
- Weight: 190 lb (86 kg; 14 st)

Career
- Sport: Golf
- Turned professional: 1976
- Former tours: European Tour; Champions Tour; European Senior Tour
- Professional wins: 20
- Highest ranking: 26 (13 March 1994)

Number of wins by tour
- European Tour: 5
- European Senior Tour: 8 (Tied-8th all-time)
- Other: 7

Best results in major championships
- Masters Tournament: CUT: 1994
- PGA Championship: T25: 1994
- U.S. Open: T16: 1993
- The Open Championship: 13th: 1993

Barry Douglas Lane (21 June 1960 – 31 December 2022) was an English professional golfer. He won five official European Tour events between 1988 and 2004. He played in the 1993 Ryder Cup and won the inaugural Andersen Consulting World Championship of Golf in late 1995. After reaching 50 he had considerable success on the European Senior Tour, winning eight times between 2010 and 2019.

== Early life ==
Lane was born in Hayes, Middlesex but grew up in Bracknell. He took up golf at age 14 and became an assistant professional at Downshire Golf Club in 1976, at age 16. He worked there for 8 years.

== Professional career ==
Lane first played on the European Tour in 1982, after three failed attempts at Q-School. From 1982 to 1984 he had little success on the tour, playing only a small number of events, and failed to qualify for the tour in 1985. He did have some success in non-tour events, winning the 1983 PGA Assistants' Championship at Coombe Hill. The win earned him a place in the World Assistants' Championship in Florida in December, which he won by 6 strokes.

Lane qualified for the European Tour again in 1986 and, playing 20 events, finished 71st in the Order of Merit. He improved again in 1987, finishing 27th in the Order of Merit with five top-10 finishes. In October 1987 he also had his biggest prize to date, £20,000, for winning the inaugural Equity & Law Challenge, an unofficial money event on the tour. Lane won the 36-hole event, in which points were gained for birdies and eagles, with a score of 15, one ahead of Bill Malley.

Lane played 26 successive seasons, from 1986 to 2011, on the European Tour. Lane's best years came in the early to mid-nineties, when he made the top ten of the Order of Merit three times, with a best of fifth in 1992. He won four European Tour events between 1988 and 1994. He had a relatively bad period in his later thirties, but after the turn of the millennium his form improved again and he picked up his fifth win on the Tour at the 2004 Daily Telegraph Damovo British Masters.

Lane won several professional tournaments not on the European Tour, most lucratively the 1995 Andersen Consulting World Championship of Golf. This event was a precursor of the WGC-Accenture Match Play Championship and Lane's prize was US$1,000,000, which was a rare level of prize in golf at that time.

Lane made his only Ryder Cup appearance in Europe's home defeat at The Belfry in 1993, losing all three of his matches. He represented England in the World Cup and the Alfred Dunhill Cup several times and played for the Rest of the World Team in the UBS Cup three times.

On turning 50 in June 2010, Lane joined the European Senior Tour. He quickly claimed his first win at the Cleveland Golf/Srixon Scottish Senior Open that August. Lane continued his good form in 2011, playing a mixture of regular and senior European Tour events, and winning twice more on the senior tour. Subsequently he enjoyed further wins on the 2012, 2016, 2017 tours and twice on the 2019 circuit.

== Death ==
Lane died of cancer on 31 December 2022, at the age of 62.

== Professional wins (20) ==
=== European Tour wins (5) ===
| No. | Date | Tournament | Winning score | Margin of victory | Runner(s)-up |
|---|---|---|---|---|---|
| 1 | 9 Jul 1988 | Bell's Scottish Open | −13 (70-67-66-68=271) | 3 strokes | (Scotland) Sandy Lyle, (Spain) José Rivero |
| 2 | 4 Oct 1992 | Mercedes German Masters | −16 (71-67-66-68=272) | 2 strokes | (Australia) Rodger Davis, (Germany) Bernhard Langer, (Wales) Ian Woosnam |
| 3 | 5 Sep 1993 | Canon European Masters | −18 (69-67-64-70=270) | 1 stroke | (Spain) Seve Ballesteros, (Spain) Miguel Ángel Jiménez |
| 4 | 13 Mar 1994 | Turespaña Open de Baleares | −19 (64-70-66-69=269) | 2 strokes | (England) Jim Payne |
| 5 | 9 May 2004 | Daily Telegraph Damovo British Masters | −16 (70-69-67-66=272) | 3 strokes | (Argentina) Ángel Cabrera, (Argentina) Eduardo Romero |

European Tour playoff record (0–3)

| No. | Year | Tournament | Opponent(s) | Result |
|---|---|---|---|---|
| 1 | 1988 | Torras Hostench Barcelona Open | (England) Nick Faldo, (Wales) Mark Mouland, (England) David Whelan | Whelan won with par on fourth extra hole Faldo and Mouland eliminated by birdie on first hole |
| 2 | 1992 | Roma Masters | (Spain) José María Cañizares | Lost to birdie on second extra hole |
| 3 | 1995 | Smurfit European Open | (Germany) Bernhard Langer | Lost to birdie on second extra hole |

=== Other wins (6) ===
- 1983 Footjoy PGA Assistants' Championship, Jamaica Open, Footjoy World Assistants' Championship
- 1987 Equity & Law Challenge
- 1995 Andersen Consulting World Championship of Golf
- 2015 Farmfoods British Par 3 Championship

=== European Senior Tour wins (8) ===
Legend
Tour Championships (2)
Other European Senior Tour (6)

| No. | Date | Tournament | Winning score | Margin of victory | Runner(s)-up |
|---|---|---|---|---|---|
| 1 | 22 Aug 2010 | Cleveland Golf/Srixon Scottish Senior Open | −4 (69-71-72=212) | 4 strokes | (England) Glenn Ralph, (England) Jim Rhodes |
| 2 | 21 Aug 2011 | Cleveland Golf/Srixon Scottish Senior Open (2) | −14 (67-69-66=202) | 2 strokes | (United States) Gary Koch |
| 3 | 18 Sep 2011 | Casa Serena Open | −15 (67-62-69=198) | 2 strokes | (Australia) Peter Fowler |
| 4 | 26 Aug 2012 | Speedy Services Wales Senior Open | −7 (72-67-70=209) | 1 stroke | (England) Philip Golding |
| 5 | 11 Dec 2016 | MCB Tour Championship | −12 (67-67-68=204) | 1 stroke | (England) Paul Broadhurst |
| 6 | 27 Aug 2017 | Willow Senior Golf Classic | −22 (67-60-67=194) | 5 strokes | (Scotland) Gary Orr |
| 7 | 1 Jun 2019 | Senior Italian Open | −8 (69-72-67=208) | Playoff | (France) Marc Farry |
| 8 | 1 Dec 2019 | MCB Tour Championship (Madagascar) (2) | −3 (70-71-69=210) | 1 stroke | (Spain) Juan Quirós, (France) Jean-François Remésy |

European Senior Tour playoff record (1–1)

| No. | Year | Tournament | Opponent | Result |
|---|---|---|---|---|
| 1 | 2014 | MCB Tour Championship | (England) Paul Wesselingh | Lost to par on sixth extra hole |
| 2 | 2019 | Senior Italian Open | (France) Marc Farry | Won with birdie on second extra hole |

=== Japan PGA Senior Tour wins (1) ===
| No. | Date | Tournament | Winning score | Margin of victory | Runner-up |
|---|---|---|---|---|---|
| 1 | 3 Nov 2018 | Fujifilm Senior Championship | −10 (67-72-64=203) | 2 strokes | (Thailand) Prayad Marksaeng |

== Results in major championships ==
| Tournament | 1987 | 1988 | 1989 |
|---|---|---|---|
| Masters Tournament | | | |
| U.S. Open | | | |
| The Open Championship | CUT | CUT | CUT |
| PGA Championship | | | |

| Tournament | 1990 | 1991 | 1992 | 1993 | 1994 | 1995 | 1996 | 1997 | 1998 | 1999 |
|---|---|---|---|---|---|---|---|---|---|---|
| Masters Tournament | | | | | CUT | | | | | |
| U.S. Open | | | | T16 | T47 | 44 | CUT | | | |
| The Open Championship | | T17 | T51 | 13 | CUT | T20 | CUT | | CUT | |
| PGA Championship | | | | T71 | T25 | T63 | | | | |

| Tournament | 2000 | 2001 | 2002 | 2003 | 2004 | 2005 | 2006 | 2007 | 2008 | 2009 |
|---|---|---|---|---|---|---|---|---|---|---|
| Masters Tournament | | | | | | | | | | |
| U.S. Open | | | | | | | | | | |
| The Open Championship | | 29 | T50 | | T14 | | CUT | | | |
| PGA Championship | | | | | | | | | | |

| Tournament | 2010 | 2011 | 2012 |
|---|---|---|---|
| Masters Tournament | | | |
| U.S. Open | | | |
| The Open Championship | | | CUT |
| PGA Championship | | | |

Did not play

CUT = missed the halfway cut
"T" indicates a tie for a place.

=== Summary ===
| Tournament | Wins | 2nd | 3rd | Top-5 | Top-10 | Top-25 | Events | Cuts made |
|---|---|---|---|---|---|---|---|---|
| Masters Tournament | 0 | 0 | 0 | 0 | 0 | 0 | 1 | 0 |
| U.S. Open | 0 | 0 | 0 | 0 | 0 | 1 | 4 | 3 |
| The Open Championship | 0 | 0 | 0 | 0 | 0 | 4 | 15 | 7 |
| PGA Championship | 0 | 0 | 0 | 0 | 0 | 1 | 3 | 3 |
| Totals | 0 | 0 | 0 | 0 | 0 | 6 | 23 | 13 |

- Most consecutive cuts made – 6 (1991 Open Championship – 1993 PGA)
- Longest streak of top-10s – 0

== Results in World Golf Championships ==
| Tournament | 2004 |
|---|---|
| Match Play | |
| Championship | T23 |
| Invitational | T55 |

Did not play

"T" = Tied

== Team appearances ==
- Dunhill Cup (representing England): 1988, 1994, 1995, 1996
- World Cup (representing England): 1988, 1994
- Ryder Cup (representing Europe): 1993
- UBS Cup (representing the Rest of the World): 2002, 2003 (tie), 2004

== See also ==
- List of golfers with most European Senior Tour wins
