= French Riviera Masters =

Tournament information
- Location: Tourrettes, Var, France
- Established: 2010
- Course: Domaine de Terre Blanche
- Par: 72
- Length: 6,955 yards (6,360 m)
- Tour: European Senior Tour
- Format: Stroke play
- Prize fund: €400,000
- Month played: October
- Final year: 2015

Tournament record score
- Aggregate: 201 Philip Golding (2014)
- To par: −15 as above

Final champion
- (England) Simon P. Brown
- Location in France Location in Provence-Alpes-Côte d'Azur

The French Riviera Masters was a men's senior (over 50) professional golf tournament on the European Senior Tour. It was held from 2010 to 2015 on the French Riviera. In 2010 and 2011 it was called the Cannes Mougins Masters and was held at Golf de Cannes-Mougins in Mougins, Cannes, before moving to Terre Blanche Hotel Spa Golf Resort, Tourrettes, Var, just southeast of Fayence. The 2015 winner was Simon P. Brown who won the first prize of €60,000 out of total prize-money of €400,000.

== Winners ==
Year	Winner	Score	To par	Margin of victory	Runner(s)-up	Venue
French Riviera Masters
2015	(England) Simon P. Brown	134 (Note: Shortened to 36 holes due to weather.)	−10	2 strokes	(Paraguay) Ángel Franco (England) Barry Lane	Terre Blanche
2014	(England) Philip Golding	201	−15	4 strokes	(Argentina) César Monasterio	Terre Blanche
2013	(Australia) Peter Fowler	205	−11	3 strokes	(Scotland) Andrew Oldcorn (Spain) Santiago Luna	Terre Blanche
2012	(England) David J. Russell	208	−8	Playoff	(United States) Tim Thelen	Terre Blanche
Cannes Mougins Masters
2011	(Spain) Juan Quirós	206	−10	Playoff	(Republic of Ireland) Des Smyth	Cannes Mougins
2010	(France) Marc Farry	207	−9	2 strokes	(Scotland) Gordon Brand Jnr	Cannes Mougins
