= Thammanoon Sriroj =

Thai professional golfer (born 1969)

Personal information
- Nationality: Thailand
- Born: 24 June 1969 (age 57)
- Height: 6 ft 0 in (1.83 m)

Career
- Sport: Golf
- Turned professional: 1991
- Current tours: All Thailand Golf Tour; Japan PGA Senior Tour
- Former tour: Asian Tour
- Professional wins: 19

Number of wins by tour
- Asian Tour: 5
- Other: 14

Best results in major championships
- Masters Tournament: DNP
- PGA Championship: DNP
- U.S. Open: DNP
- The Open Championship: CUT: 2005

Achievements and awards
- All Thailand Golf Tour Order of Merit winner: 2002, 2005, 2009

Thammanoon Sriroj (born 24 June 1969) is a Thai professional golfer who plays on the Asian Tour.

== Career ==
Sriroj has five Asian Tour wins and was one of the first ten men to reach one million dollars in Asian Tour career earnings. He has five brothers who are professional golfers and is a cousin of Asian Tour golfer Chawalit Plaphol, with whom he represented Thailand in the 2000 WGC-World Cup.

== Professional wins (19) ==
=== Asian Tour wins (5) ===
No.	Date	Tournament	Winning score	Margin of victory	Runner-up
1	31 Mar 1996	Singha Thai Prasit Bangkok Open	−14 (67-71-68-68=274)	1 stroke	(New Zealand) Stephen Scahill
2	1 Dec 1996	Tugu Pratama Indonesian PGA Championship	−14 (67-66-74-67=274)	1 stroke	(Singapore) Chua Guan Soon
3	19 Oct 1997	ABN-AMRO Pakistan Masters	−14 (67-70-68-69=274)	Playoff	(Australia) Scott Laycock
4	22 Aug 1999	Tianjin TEDA Open	−13 (65-70-65-67=267)	1 stroke	(South Korea) Park No-seok
5	22 Aug 2004	Tianjin TEDA Open (2)	−19 (64-67-69-65=265)	1 stroke	(Thailand) Boonchu Ruangkit

Asian Tour playoff record (1–2)

No.	Year	Tournament	Opponent	Result
1	1997	Sabah Masters	(South Africa) Des Terblanche	Lost to birdie on third extra hole
2	1997	ABN-AMRO Pakistan Masters	(Australia) Scott Laycock	Won with birdie on second extra hole
3	2005	Bangkok Airways Open	(Taiwan) Lu Wen-teh	Lost to par on first extra hole

=== Japan Challenge Tour wins (1) ===
No.	Date	Tournament	Winning score	Margin of victory	Runner-up
1	26 Sep 2003	Kasco Cup	−11 (67-66=133)	Playoff	(Japan) Takeshi Kajikawa

=== Asian Development Tour wins (1) ===
No.	Date	Tournament	Winning score	Margin of victory	Runner-up
1	27 Sep 2015	Ballantine's Taiwan Championship^{1}	−12 (68-72-63-73=276)	Playoff	(Taiwan) Chang Wei-lun

^{1}Co-sanctioned by the Taiwan PGA Tour

=== All Thailand Golf Tour wins (9) ===
- 2001 Singha Masters
- 2002 Prayudh Mahagitsiri Cup, Singha Masters
- 2005 Singha Masters, Cotto Open
- 2006 Chevrolet Championship
- 2009 Singha Masters, Singha Classic
- 2013 Singha Chiang Mai Open^{1}

^{1}Co-sanctioned by the ASEAN PGA Tour

=== Other wins (1) ===
- 1996 Thai PGA Championship

=== Japan PGA Senior Tour wins (3) ===
No.	Date	Tournament	Winning score	Margin of victory	Runner-up
1	8 Oct 2023	Japan PGA Senior Championship Sumitomo Corporation Summit Cup	−10 (70-68-70-70=278)	1 stroke	(Japan) Masayoshi Yamazoe
2	21 Sep 2025	Japan Senior Open	−14 (68–66–68–72=274)	2 strokes	(Japan) Fumihiro Ebine, (Japan) Nobuhiro Masuda
3	19 Oct 2025	Fancl Classic	−10 (68–68–70=206)	Playoff	(Thailand) Prayad Marksaeng, (Japan) Katsumasa Miyamoto

== Results in major championships ==
Tournament	2005
The Open Championship	CUT

CUT = missed the halfway cut
Note: Sriroj only played in The Open Championship.

== Team appearances ==
- World Cup (representing Thailand): 1995, 2000
- Dynasty Cup (representing Asia): 2003 (winners), 2005 (winners)

== See also ==
- List of golfers with most Asian Tour wins
