= 2005 TPC Tour =

Golf tour season

2005 TPC Tour season
- Duration: 12 January 2005 – 27 August 2005
- Number of official events: 5
- Most wins: (Thailand) Thammanoon Sriroj (2)
- Order of Merit: (Thailand) Thammanoon Sriroj

The 2005 TPC Tour was the seventh season of the TPC Tour, one of the main professional golf tours in Thailand since it was formed in 1999.

== Schedule ==
The following table lists official events during the 2006 season.

Date	Tournament	Location	Purse (฿)	Winner (Note: The number in brackets after each winner's name is the number of All Thailand Golf Tour events they had won up to and including that tournament.)
15 Jan	Singha Masters	Chiang Rai	2,000,000	(Thailand) Thammanoon Sriroj (4)
9 Apr	Singha Pattaya Open	Chonburi	1,000,000	(Thailand) Prayad Marksaeng (3)
16 Jul	Chevrolet Championship	Chonburi	1,000,000	(Thailand) Chawalit Plaphol (1)
14 Aug	Cotto Open	Chonburi	1,000,000	(Thailand) Thammanoon Sriroj (5)
27 Aug	TPC Tour Championships	Samut Prakan	1,000,000	(Thailand) Prom Meesawat (2)

== Order of Merit ==
The Order of Merit was based on prize money won during the season, calculated in Thai baht.

Position	Player	Prize money (฿)
1	(Thailand) Thammanoon Sriroj	283,000
2	(Thailand) Prayad Marksaeng	211,250
3	(Scotland) Simon Yates	205,000
4	(Thailand) Chapchai Nirat	187,749
5	(Thailand) Boonchu Ruangkit	183,583
