= Terre Blanche =

Terreblanche or Terre Blanche, literally "White Land" may refer to:

- Domaine de Terre Blanche
- Eugène Terre'Blanche
- Sampie Terreblanche

== See also ==
- Belaya Zemlya
- The White Land
