= ISPS Handa Senior Masters =

Men's over 50s professional golf tournament

Tournament information
- Location: Melton Mowbray, England
- Established: 2010
- Course: Stapleford Park
- Par: 73
- Length: 6,907 yards (6,316 m)
- Tour: European Senior Tour
- Format: Stroke play
- Prize fund: £200,000
- Month played: June
- Final year: 2011

Tournament record score
- Aggregate: 199 Bill Longmuir (2010)
- To par: −20 as above

Final champion
- (Australia) Peter Fowler
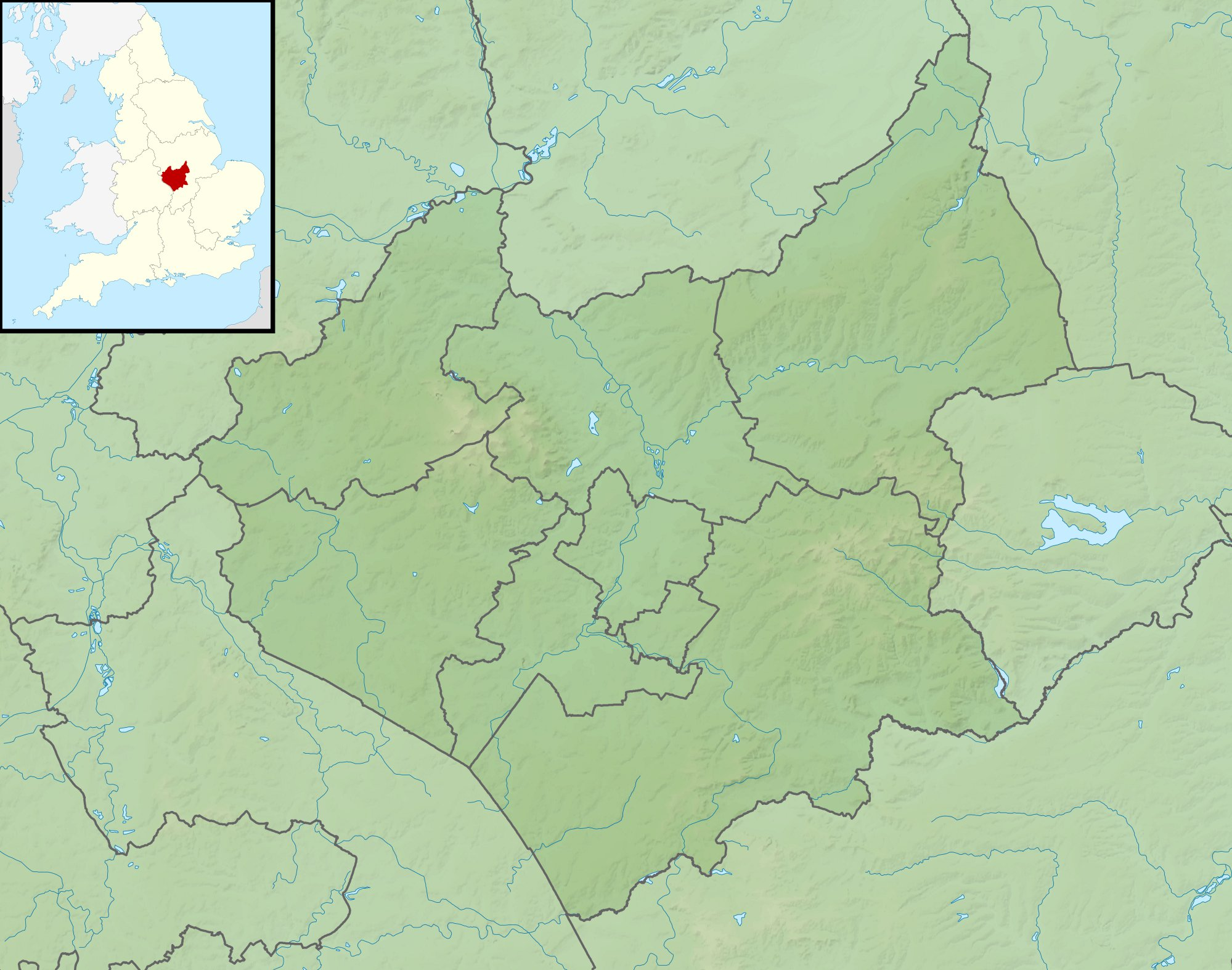
- Location in England Location in Leicestershire

The ISPS Handa Senior Masters was a men's senior (over 50) professional golf tournament on the European Senior Tour. It was held in 2010 and 2011 at Stapleford Park, east of Melton Mowbray in Leicestershire, England. Bill Longmuir won in 2010 while Peter Fowler won in 2011. The 2010 event has prize money of £400,000 with the winner receiving £60,000, while the 2011 event has prize money of £200,000 with the winner receiving £30,000.

== Winners ==
Year	Winner	Score	To par	Margin of victory	Runner(s)-up
ISPS Handa Senior Masters
2011	(Australia) Peter Fowler	209	−10	3 strokes	(Scotland) Andrew Oldcorn
Handa Senior Masters
2010	(Scotland) Bill Longmuir	199	−20	7 strokes	(England) Roger Chapman (Thailand) Boonchu Ruangkit
