= Handa Cup Senior Masters =

Tournament information
- Location: Saitama Prefecture, Japan
- Established: 2010
- Course: Ohmurasaki Golf Club
- Par: 72
- Length: 6,841 yards (6,255 m)
- Tours: European Senior Tour; Japan PGA Senior Tour
- Format: Stroke play
- Prize fund: ¥120,000,000
- Month played: November
- Final year: 2012

Tournament record score
- Aggregate: 271 Masahiro Kuramoto (2010)
- To par: −17 as above

Final champion
- (Japan) Masahiro Kuramoto
- Location in Japan Location in Saitama Prefecture

The Handa Cup Senior Masters was a men's senior (over 50) professional golf tournament named after Haruhisa Handa, held at the Ohmurasaki Golf Club, Namegawa, Saitama, Japan. It was held just once, in November 2010, and was won by Masahiro Kuramoto who finished 4 strokes ahead of the field. The total prize fund was ¥120,000,000 (€1,050,000) with the winner receiving ¥21,600,000 (€188,960). The event was co-sanctioned by the European Senior Tour and the PGA of Japan. Although played in 2010, it was part of the 2011 European Senior Tour season. Kuramoto was not a member of the European Senior Tour at the time and, although he later joined, the prize money was not included in his official earnings for the 2011 season.

== Winners ==
Year	Tours (Note: EST − European Senior Tour; JPNSEN − Japan PGA Senior Tour.)	Winner	Score	To par	Margin of victory	Runners-up
2010	EST, JPNSEN	(Japan) Masahiro Kuramoto	271	−17	4 strokes	(Japan) Satoshi Higashi (Philippines) Frankie Miñoza (Japan) Kiyoshi Murota
