= 2002 TPC Tour =

Golf tour season

2002 TPC Tour season
- Duration: 13 August 2002 – 8 November 2002
- Number of official events: 3
- Most wins: (Thailand) Thammanoon Sriroj (2)
- Order of Merit: (Thailand) Thammanoon Sriroj

The 2002 TPC Tour was the fourth season of the TPC Tour, one of the main professional golf tours in Thailand since it was formed in 1999.

== Schedule ==
The following table lists official events during the 2002 season.

Date	Tournament	Location	Purse (฿)	Winner (Note: The number in brackets after each winner's name is the number of All Thailand Golf Tour events they had won up to and including that tournament.)
16 Aug	Prayudh Mahagitsiri Cup	Bangkok	1,500,000	(Thailand) Thammanoon Sriroj (2)
21 Oct	TPC Championships	Samut Prakan	1,000,000	(Thailand) Boonchu Ruangkit (2)
8 Nov	Singha Masters	Chiang Rai	2,000,000	(Thailand) Thammanoon Sriroj (3)

== Order of Merit ==
The Order of Merit was based on prize money won during the season, calculated in Thai baht.

Position	Player	Prize money (฿)
1	(Thailand) Thammanoon Sriroj	370,000
2	(Thailand) Boonchu Ruangkit	318,033
3	(Thailand) Thaworn Wiratchant	239,800
4	(Scotland) Simon Yates	196,158
5	(United States) Gregory Hanrahan	190,709
