= ISPS Handa Senior World Championship =

Tournament information
- Location: Shenzhen, China
- Established: 2011
- Course: Mission Hills Golf Club
- Par: 72
- Length: 6,985 yards (6,387 m)
- Tour: European Senior Tour
- Format: Stroke play
- Prize fund: US$350,000
- Month played: March
- Final year: 2011

Tournament record score
- Aggregate: 204 Sandy Lyle (2011)
- To par: −12 as above

Final champion
- (Scotland) Sandy Lyle
- Location in China

The ISPS Handa Senior World Championship was a men's senior (over 50) professional golf tournament on the European Senior Tour. It was held just once, in March 2011, at the Mission Hills Golf Club, north of Shenzhen, China. The winner was Sandy Lyle who won the first prize of $52,500 out of total prize-money of $350,000. The tournament was co-sanctioned by Chinese Golf Association.

== Winners ==
Year	Winner	Score	To par	Margin of victory	Runner-up
2011	(Scotland) Sandy Lyle	204	−12	3 strokes	(Australia) Peter Fowler
