= Benahavis Senior Masters =

Golf tournament

Mallorca Open Senior
Tournament information
- Location: Benahavis, Spain
- Established: 2009
- Courses: La Quinta Golf & Country Club
- Par: 71
- Length: 6,448 yards (5,896 m)
- Tour: European Senior Tour
- Format: Stroke play
- Prize fund: €200,000
- Month played: June
- Final year: 2012

Tournament record score
- Aggregate: 197 Boonchu Ruangkit (2010)
- To par: −16 as above

Final champion
- (England) Gary Wolstenholme
- Location in Spain Location in Andalusia

The Benahavis Senior Masters was a golf tournament on the European Senior Tour. It was played at the La Quinta Golf & Country Club near Benahavís, Marbella, Spain.

The first edition was in 2009. It ended in a playoff between Carl Mason and Gordon Brand Jnr. It was Mason's sixth victory in Spain since 1994. The next week Mason won the Bad Ragaz PGA Seniors Open. That was his 23rd title on the Seniors Tour, equalling the record of Tommy Horton. Mason broke that record when he won in Murcia in May 2011.

The second edition was won by Boonchu Ruangkit by a margin of 7 strokes. Second position was shared by John Gould and Carl Mason. It was Ruangkit's first win in Europe.

In 2011, Gary Wolstenholme held the lead after each of the first two rounds. In the third round, Carl Mason took over, making three birdies on the front nine. It was his 25th win on the Seniors Tour. Mark James and Gary Wolstenholme shared second place, three strokes behind.

Gary Wolstenholme won the 2012 tournament with rounds of 67, 67 and 66. Mark James and Mark Mouland shared second place, a shot behind.

== Winners ==
Year	Winner	Score	To par	Margin of victory	Runner(s)-up
2012	(England) Gary Wolstenholme	200	−13	1 stroke	(England) Mark James (Wales) Mark Mouland
2011	(England) Carl Mason (2)	204	−9	3 strokes	(England) Mark James (England) Gary Wolstenholme
2010	(Thailand) Boonchu Ruangkit	197	−16	7 strokes	(England) John Gould (England) Carl Mason
2009	(England) Carl Mason	206	−7	Playoff	(Scotland) Gordon Brand Jnr
