= Chang Thailand Senior Masters =

Tournament information
- Location: Bangkok, Thailand
- Established: 2010
- Course: Royal Gems Golf Club
- Par: 72
- Length: 6,931 yards (6,338 m)
- Tour: European Senior Tour
- Format: Stroke play
- Prize fund: US$400,000
- Month played: March
- Final year: 2010

Tournament record score
- Aggregate: 195 Boonchu Ruangkit (2010)
- To par: −21 as above

Final champion
- (Thailand) Boonchu Ruangkit
- Location in Thailand

The Chang Thailand Senior Masters was a men's senior (over 50) professional golf tournament on the European Senior Tour, held at the Royal Gems Golf Club, Thanyaburi, north-east of Bangkok, Thailand. It was held just once, in March 2010, and was won by Boonchu Ruangkit who finished 11 strokes ahead of the field. The total prize fund was $400,000 with the winner receiving $60,000.

== Winners ==
Year	Winner	Score	To par	Margin of victory	Runners-up
2010	(Thailand) Boonchu Ruangkit	195	−21	11 strokes	(Thailand) Jamnian Chitprasong (Philippines) Frankie Miñoza (Japan) Katsuyoshi Tomori
