= George Ryall =

English golfer (born 1958)

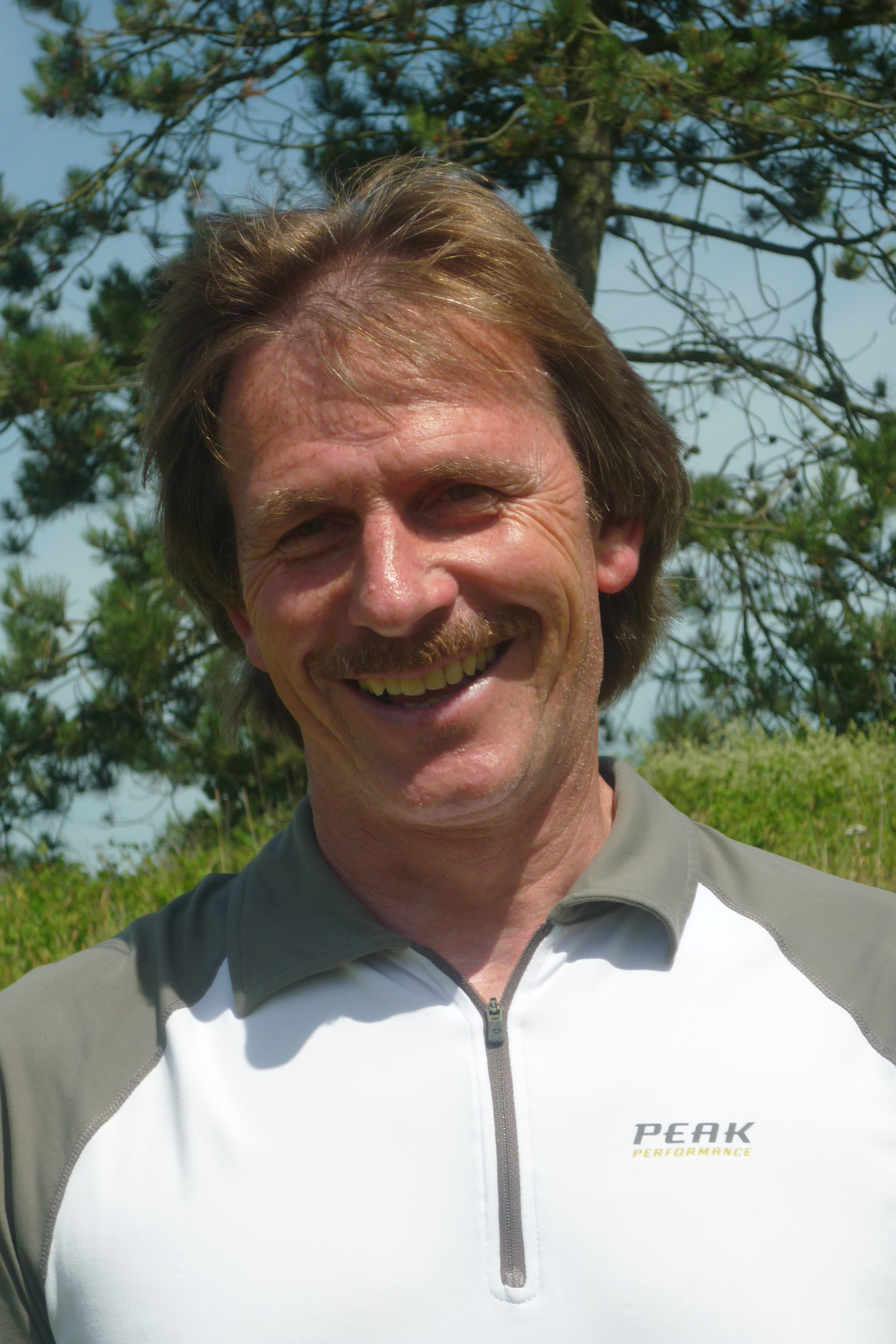

Personal information
- Nationality: England
- Born: 26 September 1958 (age 68) Portishead, England
- Height: 6 ft 0 in (1.83 m)

Career
- Sport: Golf
- Turned professional: 1988
- Former tours: Challenge Tour; European Senior Tour
- Professional wins: 3

Number of wins by tour
- Challenge Tour: 1
- European Senior Tour: 1
- Other: 1

George Ryall (born 26 September 1958) is an English professional golfer.

== Career ==
Ryall was born in Portishead, Somerset and turned professional in 1988. He has won several tournaments on the Gloucester and Somerset PGA Circuit and headed the Order of Merit in both 2006–7 and 2008–9.

On turning 50 in 2008 Ryall joined the European Senior Tour, gaining a conditional card at his first attempt at qualifying school. He failed to win sufficient money in his rookie season to retain his playing status, which resulted in limited opportunities in 2010. He made the most of those chances, finishing tied for 5th at the Bad Ragaz PGA Seniors Open in early July which gained him entry to the Van Lanschot Senior Open the following week, where he claimed his first title with a one stroke victory over Andrew Oldcorn.

== Professional wins (3) ==
=== Challenge Tour wins (1) ===
No.	Date	Tournament	Winning score	Margin of victory	Runner-up
1	8 Sep 1991	Perrier Belgian Pro-Am	−6 (73-70-67=210)	1 stroke	(England) Paul Way

=== Other wins (1) ===
- 2009 Senior PGA Professional Championship

=== European Senior Tour wins (1) ===
No.	Date	Tournament	Winning score	Margin of victory	Runner-up
1	11 Jul 2010	Van Lanschot Senior Open	−10 (72-68-66=206)	1 stroke	(Scotland) Andrew Oldcorn

== Team appearances ==
- PGA Cup (representing Great Britain & Ireland): 2007
