= 2010 European Senior Tour =

Golf tour season

2010 European Senior Tour season
- Duration: 11 December 2009 – 13 December 2010
- Number of official events: 21
- Most wins: (Thailand) Boonchu Ruangkit (4)
- Order of Merit: (Thailand) Boonchu Ruangkit
- Rookie of the Year: (Thailand) Boonchu Ruangkit

The 2010 European Senior Tour was the 19th season of the European Senior Tour, the main professional golf tour in Europe for men aged 50 and over.

== Schedule ==
The following table lists official events during the 2010 season.

Date	Tournament	Host country	Purse (€)	Winner (Note: The number in brackets after each winner's name is the number of European Senior Tour events they had won up to and including that tournament. This information is only shown for European Senior Tour members.)	Notes
13 Dec	Mauritius Commercial Bank Open	Mauritius	230,000	(England) Kevin Spurgeon (1)	New tournament
7 Mar	Aberdeen Brunei Senior Masters	Brunei	US$400,000	(Thailand) Boonchu Ruangkit (1)	
14 Mar	Chang Thailand Senior Masters	Thailand	US$400,000	(Thailand) Boonchu Ruangkit (2)	New tournament
28 Mar	Berenberg Bank Masters	South Africa	500,000	(Thailand) Boonchu Ruangkit (3)	New tournament
14 May	Handa Senior Masters	England	£400,000	(Scotland) Bill Longmuir (8)	New tournament
30 May	Senior PGA Championship	United States	US$2,000,000	(United States) Tom Lehman (n/a)	Senior major championship
6 Jun	Matrix Jersey Classic	Jersey	£135,000	(Scotland) Gordon Brand Jnr (1)	
13 Jun	Handa Irish Senior Open	Ireland	250,000	(France) Marc Farry (1)	
20 Jun	Ryder Cup Wales Seniors Open	Wales	600,000	(South Africa) John Bland (3)	
27 Jun	De Vere Collection PGA Seniors Championship	England	£250,000	(England) David J. Russell (1)	
4 Jul	Bad Ragaz PGA Seniors Open	Switzerland	250,000	(England) Carl Mason (23)	
11 Jul	Van Lanschot Senior Open	Netherlands	250,000	(England) George Ryall (1)	New tournament
25 Jul	The Senior Open Championship	Scotland	US$2,000,000	(Germany) Bernhard Langer (2)	Senior major championship
1 Aug	U.S. Senior Open	United States	US$2,600,000	(Germany) Bernhard Langer (3)	Senior major championship (Note: Official win; unofficial money.)
22 Aug	Cleveland Golf/Srixon Scottish Senior Open	Scotland	£250,000	(England) Barry Lane (1)	
5 Sep	Travis Perkins plc Senior Masters	England	£260,000	(Republic of Ireland) Des Smyth (3)	
19 Sep	Casa Serena Open	Czech Republic	600,000	(England) Gary Wolstenholme (1)	
11 Oct	Cannes Mougins Masters	France	250,000	(France) Marc Farry (2)	New tournament
17 Oct	Benahavis Senior Masters	Spain	180,000	(Thailand) Boonchu Ruangkit (4)	New tournament
24 Oct	Sicilian Senior Open	Italy	250,000	(Spain) Domingo Hospital (1)	New tournament
7 Nov	OKI Castellón Senior Tour Championship	Spain	400,000	(United States) Mike Cunning (2)	Tour Championship

== Order of Merit ==
The Order of Merit was based on prize money won during the season, calculated in Euros.

Position	Player	Prize money (€)
1	(Thailand) Boonchu Ruangkit	266,609
2	(South Africa) Chris Williams	227,350
3	(Paraguay) Ángel Franco	217,308
4	(Scotland) Gordon Brand Jnr	197,017
5	(England) Carl Mason	190,008

== Awards ==
Award	Winner	Ref.
Rookie of the Year	(Thailand) Boonchu Ruangkit	
