= Jorge Soto (golfer) =

Argentine golfer

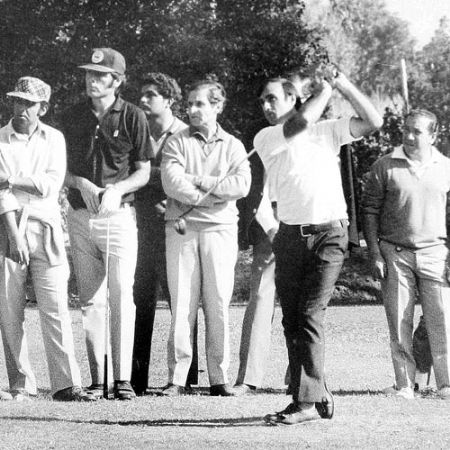

Personal information
- Full name: Jorge Soto
- Nationality: Argentina
- Born: 2 March 1945 Merlo, Buenos Aires
- Died: 26 October 2011 (aged 66)

Career
- Sport: Golf
- Turned professional: 1963
- Professional wins: 34

Achievements and awards
- Argentine Tour Order of Merit winner: 1982, 1983

Jorge Soto (2 March 1945 – 26 October 2011) was an Argentine professional golfer.

== Career ==
Soto was born in Merlo, Buenos Aires and turned professional in 1963.

Soto won the Argentine Order of Merit in 1982 and 1983. He won the Argentine Open in 1982 and was runner up in 1972. He also won The Argentine PGA Championship in 1984 and 1989, having finished second in 1968 and 1977.

Soto represented Argentina on four occasions in the World Cup, with a best finish of 5th place in partnership with Juan Carlos Cabrera in the 1975 edition in Thailand.

== Professional wins ==
=== Argentine wins (30) ===
- 1966 Charles of the Ritz Grand Prix
- 1975 North Open, Chaco Open, Jujuy Open, Fultom Grand Prix
- 1976 San Martin Grand Prix
- 1977 Olavarria Grand Prix
- 1978 Tortugas Grand Prix
- 1979 Chaco Open
- 1980 Tortugas Grand Prix
- 1981 Ituzaingo Grand Prix
- 1982 Argentine Open, Rio Cuarto Open, Chaco Open, Jockey Club San Isidro Grand Prix
- 1983 South Open, Acantilados Grand Prix, Rio Cuarto Open, Abierto del Litoral (tie with Adan Sowa), Jockey Club Rosario Open
- 1984 Argentine PGA Championship, Los Lagartos Grand Prix, Hindu Club Grand Prix
- 1986 Ituzaingo Grand Prix
- 1989 Center Open, Argentine PGA Championship
- 1990 Highland Park Grand Prix
- 1992 Pinamar Open
- 1993 South Open
- 1994 Jose Jurado Grand Prix

=== Other wins (1) ===
- 1988 Prince of Wales Open (Chile)

=== Argentine senior wins (3) ===
- 1997 Osvaldo Manzini Senior Grand Prix, Pilar Senior Open, Boca Raton Senior Grand Prix

== Team appearances ==
- World Cup (representing Argentina): 1975, 1979, 1980, 1988
