= Mike Cunning =

American professional golfer

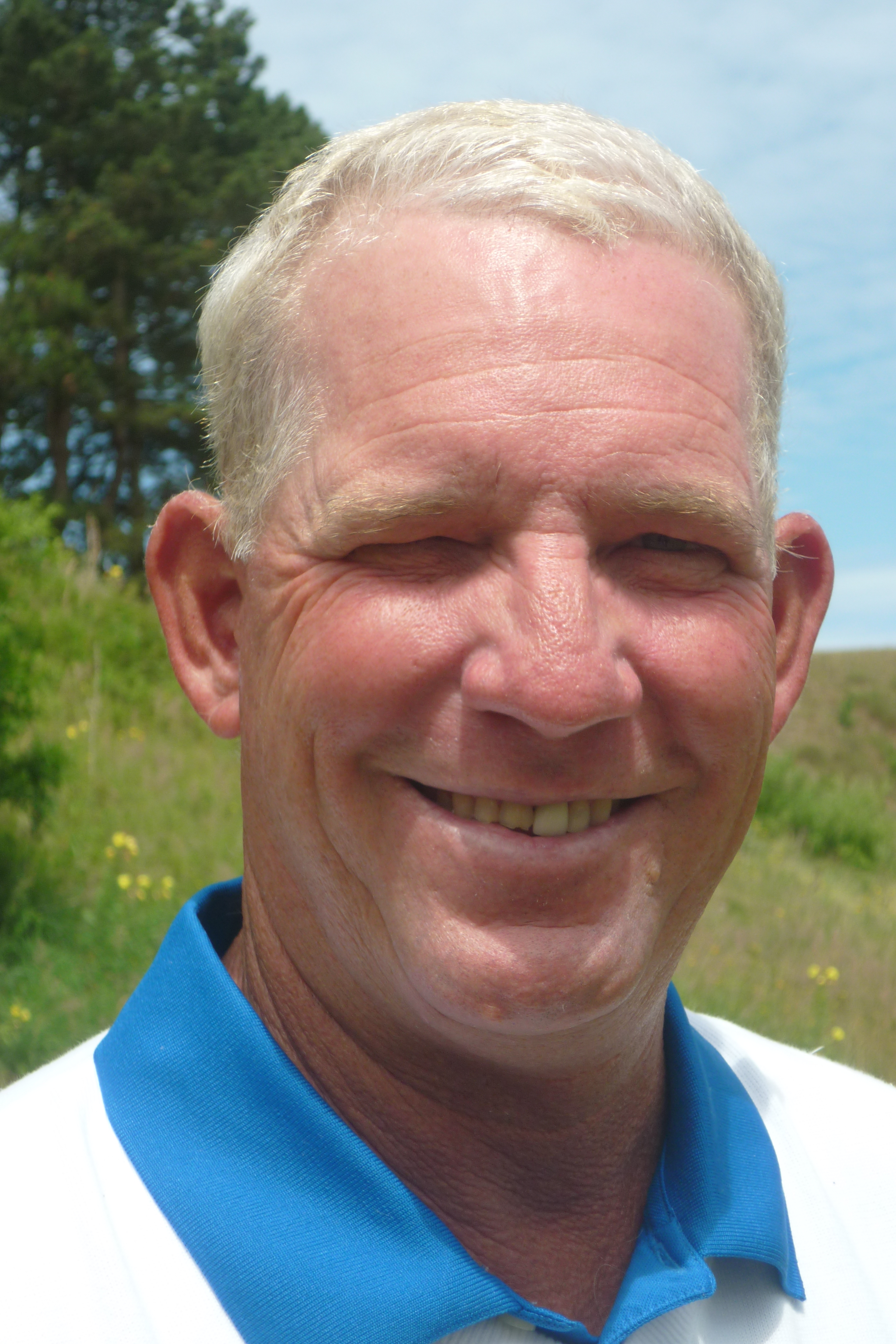

Personal information
- Full name: Michael Cunning
- Nationality: United States
- Born: July 30, 1958 (age 68) Phoenix, Arizona, U.S.
- Height: 5 ft 11 in (1.80 m)
- Weight: 191 lb (87 kg; 13.6 st)

Career
- Sport: Golf
- College: University of Arizona
- Turned professional: 1980
- Current tour: European Senior Tour
- Former tours: PGA Tour; Asian Tour
- Professional wins: 9

Number of wins by tour
- Asian Tour: 1
- European Senior Tour: 2
- Other: 6

Achievements and awards
- Asian PGA Tour Order of Merit winner: 1997

Michael Cunning (born July 30, 1958) is an American professional golfer.

== Early life ==
Cunning was born in Phoenix, Arizona. He played collegiately at the University of Arizona.

== Professional career ==
In 1980, Cunning turned professional. He played on the PGA Tour in 1984, making only one cut in 16 events. He played again on the Tour in 1992 after finishing T13 at the 1991 Q-school. In 1992, he made 11 cuts in 30 events with one top 10 finish and lost his tour card by finishing 165th on the money list. He played on the Nike Tour in 1993, makin 14 cuts in 23 events with two top 10 finishes. He has played only sparingly in the U.S. since then.

Cunning has played in Asia since 1981, and has been a regular on the Asian Tour since it began in its modern form in 1995. In 1997 he topped the Order of Merit with earnings of US$170,619, despite a best tournament finish of second place. In 2003 he won his only Asian Tour title to date at the Royal Challenge Indian Open. He has also made appearances on the European Tour and the Japan Golf Tour.

In 2009 he won the Aberdeen Brunei Senior Masters on the European Senior Tour.

== Professional wins (9) ==
=== Asian PGA Tour wins (1) ===
No.	Date	Tournament	Winning score	Margin of victory	Runner-up
1	Mar 30, 2003	Royal Challenge Indian Open	−18 (69-69-68-64=270)	5 strokes	(Canada) Rick Gibson

Asian PGA Tour playoff record (0–1)

No.	Year	Tournament	Opponent	Result
1	1996	Lexus International	(Thailand) Boonchu Ruangkit	Lost to birdie on first extra hole

=== Asia Golf Circuit wins (1) ===
No.	Date	Tournament	Winning score	Margin of victory	Runners-up
1	Mar 24, 1996	Rolex Masters	−9 (71-64-69=204) (Note: Shortened to 54 holes due to weather.)	1 stroke	(United States) Peter Teravainen, (United States) Don Walsworth

=== Korean Tour wins (1) ===
No.	Date	Tournament	Winning score	Margin of victory	Runner-up
1	Sep 18, 1994	Korea Open	−6 (71-71-71-69=282)	2 strokes	(South Korea) Kim Jong-il

=== South American Tour wins (1) ===
- 1994 Paraguay Open

=== Other wins (3) ===
- 1989 São Paulo Classic (Brazil)
- 1994 Pearl Heights Open (Taiwan)
- 2006 Long Beach Open

=== European Senior Tour wins (2) ===
Legend
Tour Championships (1)
Other European Senior Tour (1)

No.	Date	Tournament	Winning score	Margin of victory	Runner-up
1	Mar 1, 2009	Aberdeen Brunei Senior Masters	−7 (69-67-70=206)	2 strokes	(Northern Ireland) Jimmy Heggarty
2	Nov 7, 2010	OKI Castellón Senior Tour Championship	−14 (69-69-64=202)	1 stroke	(Spain) José Rivero

== See also ==
- 1983 PGA Tour Qualifying School graduates
- 1991 PGA Tour Qualifying School graduates
