= Sicilian Senior Open =

Golf tournament

Tournament information
- Location: Castiglione di Sicilia, Italy
- Established: 2010
- Course: Il Picciolo Golf Club
- Par: 72
- Length: 6,427 yards (5,877 m)
- Tour: European Senior Tour
- Format: Stroke play
- Prize fund: €250,000
- Month played: October
- Final year: 2012

Tournament record score
- Aggregate: 211 Horacio Carbonetti (2010); 211 Domingo Hospital (2010)
- To par: −5 as above

Final champion
- (Spain) Domingo Hospital
- Location in Italy Location in Sicily

The Sicilian Senior Open was a men's senior (over 50) professional golf tournament on the European Senior Tour. It was held just once, in October 2010, at the Il Picciolo Golf Club, Castiglione di Sicilia, on the north-east part of Sicily, Italy. The winner was Domingo Hospital who won the first prize of €37,500 out of total prize-money of €250,000, after a playoff with Horacio Carbonetti.

== Winners ==
Year	Winner	Score	To par	Margin of victory	Runner-up
2010	(Spain) Domingo Hospital	211	−5	Playoff	(Argentina) Horacio Carbonetti
