= Simon P. Brown =

English golfer

Personal information
- Nationality: England
- Born: 12 April 1963 (age 63) Worthing, Sussex, England
- Height: 1.70 m (5 ft 7 in)
- Weight: 71 kg (157 lb; 11.2 st)

Career
- Sport: Golf
- Turned professional: 1983
- Current tour: European Senior Tour
- Professional wins: 3

Number of wins by tour
- European Senior Tour: 3

Simon P. Brown (born 12 April 1963) is an English professional golfer who has won three times on the European Senior Tour since turning 50 in 2013. Two of his wins have been in tournaments reduced to 36 holes by bad weather.

Brown grew up in Sussex but moved to Austria in 1984 and then to Germany to become the professional at Golf Club Rhein-Sieg, in Bonn.

== Professional wins (3) ==
=== European Senior Tour wins (3) ===
No.	Date	Tournament	Winning score	Margin of victory	Runner(s)-up
1	15 Sep 2013	Russian Open Golf Championship (Senior)	−12 (66-68-70=204)	2 strokes	(England) Carl Mason, (Australia) Mike Harwood
2	13 Oct 2013	Dutch Senior Open	−3 (72-71=143)*	2 strokes	(Scotland) Ross Drummond
3	4 Oct 2015	French Riviera Masters	−10 (66-68=134)*	2 strokes	(Paraguay) Ángel Franco, (England) Barry Lane

*Note: Tournament shortened to 36 holes due to weather.
