= Argentine Amateur Championship =

Golf tournament

The Argentine Amateur Championship, or Campeonato Argentino de Aficionados, is an annual amateur golf tournament, organized by the Asociación Argentina de Golf. Among the championships for amateurs that are currently being played all over the world, the Argentine Amateur Championship is in sixth place by seniority. It has as predecessors only The Amateur Championship of Great Britain, started in 1885; the Amateur Championship of Ireland, in 1892; only for Irish natives, in 1893; the U.S. Amateur that has been played since 1894, and the Amateur Championship of New Zealand, also of 1893. The Argentine Amateur Championship shares the sixth position with the Canadian Amateur and the Amateur of Wales, both also of 1895.

The winner of the qualification tournament receives the Kenneth R Gordon Davis Cup.

This championship should not be confused with the Copa Pereyra Iraola, which is won by the low amateur at the Argentine Open.

Year	Venue	Champion	Score	Runner-up	Winner of qualification	Score
2022	El Terron CC	Andrés Schönbaum	8 & 7	Augusto Bruchmann (h)	Joaquín Ludueña	138
2021	Tortugas CC	Andrés Schönbaum	9 & 8	Juan Ignacio Dubra	Exequiel Rodríguez Barri	133
2020	Club Newman	Leandro Correa	7 & 6	Juan Ignacio Noba	Abel Gallegos	131
2019	GC Argentino	Leandro Correa	2 & 1	Andres Schombaum	Guillermo Estivill	136
2018	CUBA Fatima	Federico Shin	2 & 1	Juan Ignacio Noba	Julián Álvarez Merialdo	136
2017	Nordelta GC	Martin Contini	3 & 2	Andres Gallegos	Marcos Montenegro	139
2016	Estancias GC	Herik Machado (Brazil)	2 up	Andres Schombaum	Kyle McLatchie (South Africa)	132
2015	Tortugas CC	Cameron John (Australia)	2 & 1	Andre Tourinho (Brazil)	Robin Dawson (Ireland)	99
2014	Highlkand Park CC	Andres Gallegos	4 & 3	Austin Connelly (Canada)	Corey Conners (Canada)	133
2013	Martindale CC	Marcos Montenegro	4 & 3	Jacopo Vecchi Fosa (Italy)	Filippo Campigli (Italy)	135
2012	Estancias GC	Antoni Ferrer (Spain)	5 & 3	Joshua Munt (New Zealand)	Rank Garret (Canada)	138
2011	San Isidro GC	Daan Huizing (Netherlands)	9 & 7	Patricio Tolosa	Joaquín Bonjour	135
2010	Highlkand Park CC	Julian Lerda	8 & 6	Tommy Cocha	D. Zuluaga Ocampo (Colombia)	136
2009	Buenos Aires CC	Romain Wattel (France)	7 & 5	Ross Kellet (Scotland)	Benedict Staben (Germany)	136
2008	Nordelta GC	Luke Goddard	4 & 3	Leandro Marelli	Scott Borrowman (Scotland)	141
2007	San Andres GC	Pablo Lozada	6 & 5	Ary Rodriguez	Esteban Martínez	141
2006	Buenos Aires CC	Sebastián Saavedra	1 up	Estanislao Goya	Estanislao Goya	66
2005	GC Argentino	Alan Wagner	3 & 2	Tomas Argonz	Sebastián Saavedra	143
2004	Highlkand Park CC	Sebastián Saavedra	7 & 5	Emilio Dominguez	Sebastián Saavedra	141
2003	Los Lagartos CC	Carlos Pedroso	2 up	Fabrizio Zanotti (Paraguay)	Luciano Giometti	140
2002	Olivos GC	Fernando Chiesa	7 & 6	Pablo Lozada	Carlos Pedrozo	142
2001	Hurlingham Club	Nicolas Bollini	10 & 9	Clodomiro Carranza	Nicolas Bollini	138
2000	San Isidro GC	Matias Anselmo	3 & 2	Nicolas Galperin	Martín Monguzzi	148
1999	San Andres GC	Nicolas Sedler	4 & 3	Jose Luis Campra	Julio Madero	138
1998	Ituzaingo GC	Julian Nicolosi	2 & 1	Ernesto Rivas	Julián Nicolosi	141
1997	Los Lagartos CC	Juan Pablo Abatte	1 up	Francisco Aleman	Juan Pablo Abbate	137
1996	Ranelagh GC	Carlos Alvarez	37 holes	Martin Travella	Marcos Hong	146
1995	Jockey Club	Lester Peterson	3 & 1	Julio Madero	Esteban Isasi	139
1994	Olivos GC	Gustavo Piovano	3 & 2	Manuel Maglione	Gustavo Piovano	139
1993	GC Argentino	Gonzalo Ramacciotti	2 up	Luis Graziani	Luis Graziani	144
1992	Martindale CC	Martin Travella	2 & 1	Francisco Aleman	Julio Rivas	137
1991	Highlkand Park CC	Julio Rivas	1 up	Fernando Chiesa	Antonio Chiesa	144
1990	Olivos GC	Ronaldo Damm	4 & 3	Francisco Aleman	Manuel Tagle	143
1989	San Andres GC	Francisco Aleman	4 & 2	Sebastian Cordeiro	Federico Mc Neill	141
1988	Hurlingham Club	Jaime Nogues	38 holes	Fernando Chiesa	Jaime Nougues	137
1987	GC Argentino	Julio Rivas	6 & 5	Fernando Chiesa	Julio Rivas	144
1986	Olivos GC	Diego Ventureira	6 & 5	Marcos Moreno	Martín Travella	145
1985	Jockey Club	Fernando Curutchet	8 & 7	Hector Gerbaudo	Miguel Ángel Prado	148
1984	San Isidro GC	Miguel Angel Prado	9 & 8	Jaime Nogues	Luis Carbonetti	146
1983	Ituzaingo GC	Daniel Vizzolini	3 & 1	Federico Mc Neill	Jordan Palandjoglou	223
1982	San Andres GC	Daniel Vizzolini	7 & 6	Eduardo Ferrante	Federico Mc Neill	221
1981	Ranelagh CC	Juan Carlos Devoto	3 & 2	Fernando Chiesa	Jorge Nicolosi	226
1980	GC Argentino	Miguel Angel Prado	5 & 4	Raul O´Curry	Miguel Ángel Prado	226
1979	San Andres GC	Miguel Angel Prado	40 holes	Oscar Vetere	Luis Carbonetti	216
1978	Hurlingham Club	Juan Carlos Devoto	1 up	Alberto Texier	Miguel Ángel Prado	210
1977	San Isidro GC	Horacio Carbonetti	4 & 3	Ricardo Kent	Luis Carbonetti	292
1976	GC Argentino	Roberto Monguzzi	4 & 2	Horacio Carbonetti	Roberto Monguzzi	293
1975	Ranelagh GC	Horacio Carbonetti	4 & 2	Luis Carbonetti	Luis A. Daneri	301
1974	Olivos GC	Juan Carlos Devoto	3 & 2	Jorge Ledesma	Horacio Carbonetti	291
1973	GCG San Martín	Alberto Texier	4 & 3	Jorge Eiras	Luis Carbonetti	285
1972	Hindú Club	Horacio Carbonetti	4 & 3	Jorge Ocampo	Horacio Carbonetti	293
1971	Ituzaingo GC	Roberto Monguzzi	6 & 5	Jorge Ocampo	Roberto Monguzzi	281
1970	San Andrés GC	Jorge Ocampo	3 & 1	Roberto Benito	Emilio Nelson Serra	300
1969	Jockey CA	Alberto Texier	5 & 4	Alberto Barreira	Alberto Texier	295
1968	Tortugas CC	Eduardo Maglione	5 & 3	Hernán Fernández	Jorge Ledesma	293
1967	San Isidro GC	Jorge Ledesma	2 up	Jorge de Azcuenaga	Jorge Ledesma	152
1966	GC Argentino	Jorge Ledesma	3 & 2	Hernán Fernández	Jorge Ledesma	145
1965	Lomas AC	Oscar Cella	w.o		Jorge Ledesma	142
1964	Hurlingham Club	Raúl Travieso	3 & 2	José Ponzio	Jorge Ledesma	141
1963	Ranelagh GC	Raúl Travieso	4 & 3	Jorge Ledesma	Jorge Ledesma	149
1962	Olivos GC	Raúl Travieso	2 & 1	Jorge Ledesma	Jorge Ledesma	142
1961	GCG San Martín	Oscar Cella	5 & 4	Valerio Gerbaudo	Hernán Fernández	140
1960	Hindú Club	Raúl Travieso	3 & 2	Hernán Bertolini	Carlos Bracht	142
1959	San Isidro GC	Jorge Ledesma	9 & 8	Alfredo Vercelli	Roberto Benito	147
1958	GC Argentino	Hernán Fernández	8 & 6	Hernán Bertolini	José Ponzio	147
1957	San Isidro	Carlos Bracht	1 up	Oscar Cella Náutico	Guillermo Carman	146
1956	Ituzaingo GC	Hugo Nicora	1 up	Roberto Benito	Jorge Ledesma	144
1955	San Andrés GC	Hugo Nicora	5 & 4	Aníbal Cantoli	Tulio Martini	146
1954	Jockey CA	Hugo Nicora	7 & 6	Tulio Martini	Tulio Martini	148
1953	Jockey CA	Hubert O'Farrell	1 up	Juan Segura	Rogelio V. López	143
1952	Jockey CA	Hugo Nicora	5 & 4	Adolfo Videla	Jorge Ledesma	150
1951	Lomas AC	Juan A. Barbera	1 up	José de Anchorena	Adolfo Videla	154
1950	Jockey CA	Juan Segura	6 & 5	Kenneth Gordon Davis	Carlos Bracht	144
1949	Ranelagh GC	Alberto Texier	3 & 2	Hugo Nicora	Alberto Texier	145
1948	Hurlingham Club	Alberto Texier	Hole 38	Luis Obarrio	Juan B. Segura	137
1947	San Isidro GC	Alberto Texier	8 & 7	Juan Segura	Pedro M. Ledesma	146
1946	GC Argentino	Mário Gonzalez (Brazil)	10 & 9	Tulio Martini	Roberto Hume	147
1945	No tournament					
1944	Olivos GC	Mário Gonzalez (Brazil)	3 & 2	Willie Shea	Mário Gonzalez (Brazil)	145
1943	Hindú Club	Emilio de Anchorena	12 & 10	Luis A. de Herrera	Emilio de Anchorena	151
1942	San Andrés GC	Luis A. de Herrera	2 & 1	H. Paterson	Emilio de Anchorena	151
1941	GC Argentino	José de Anchorena	2 & 1	Federico Osinalde	Alberto de Anchorena	155
1940	Ituzaingo GC	Mario González (Brazil)	10 & 9	Pedro Ledesma	Garnet O. Dunsmore	151
1939	Jockey CA	Luis María Piccardo	1 up	Pedro Ledesma	Alberto de Anchorena	151
1938	Lomas AC	Emilio de Anchorena	7 & 6	Alberto de Anchorena	Emilio de Anchorena	152
1937	San Isidro GC	Alberto de Anchorena	1 up	Emilio de Anchorena	Horacio Vignoles	156
1936	Olivos GC	Jorge López Naguil	6 & 5	Harry W. Smith	Harry W. Smith	160
1935	San Andrés GC	Garnet O. Dunsmore	3 & 2	Alberto de Anchorena	Ángel Traverso	156
1934	GC Argentino	Adolfo Zuberbühler	3 & 2	Héctor Villamil	Emilio de Anchorena	156
1933	Ituzaingo GC	Alberto de Anchorena	5 & 4	Alfonso Moffat	Alberto de Anchorena	161
1932	Ranelagh GC	Alfonso Moffat	4 & 2	Mariano Demaria	Alfonso M. Moffat	152
1931	Jockey CA	Harry W. Smith	5 & 3	Francisco Martínez		
1930	San Andrés GC	Harry W. Smith	1 up	Emilio de Anchorena		
1929	Ituzaingo GC	Enrique Echague	3 & 2	Carlos Mugica		
1928	San Andrés GC	Enrique Echague	4 & 3	Mariano Demaria		
1927	Lomas AC	James Mc Gaul	5 & 4	John Cruickshank		
1926	GC Argentino	John Cruickshank	6 & 4	Val. G. Scroggie		
1925	Lomas AC	John Cruickshank	7 & 6	J. Morrison		
1924	San Andrés GC	R. Bailey	3 & 2	L. Sertevens		
1923	San Andrés	John Cruickshank	12 & 11	R. Jones		
1922	San Andrés GC	Federico Elortondo	1 up	H. Hickey		
1921	GC Argentino	Harry W. Smith	7 & 6	Val. G. Scroggie		
1920	San Andrés GC	H. Hickey	1 up	H. Salmonson		
1919	GC Argentino	John May	3 & 1	E. Gibson		
1918	San Andrés GC	R. Bailey	9 & 8	James Marjoribanks		
1917	Lomas AC	James Brown	4 & 2	W. Yule		
1916	San Andrés GC	John May	6 & 4	S. Dodds		
1915	San Andrés GC	A. Kidd	4 & 3	S. Smiles		
1914	San Andrés GC	C. Fitzherbert	2 & 1	A. Kidd		
1913	GC Argentino	H. Hickey	11 & 10	R. Paton		
1912	San Andrés GC	H. Hickey	6 & 5	J. Nelson		
1911	San Andrés GC	H. Bucknall	4 & 3	John May		
1910	GC Argentino	W. Gardon	1 up	W. Agar		
1909	San Andrés GC	P. Aste	5 & 4	James Brown		
1908	San Andrés GC	K. Carlisle	6 & 4	Frank Sutton		
1907	San Andrés GC	Frank Sutton	9 & 7	James Brown		
1906	San Andrés GC	John A. Wright	1 up	Frank Sutton		
1905	San Andrés GC	J. Gardon	2 & 1	R. Paton		
1904	San Andrés GC	James Brown	2 & 1	G. Hamill		
1903	San Andrés GC	James Brown	2 & 1	G. Hamill		
1902	Flores GC	James Brown	2 & 1	A. Adamson		
1901	Lomas AC	James Watson	5 & 3	A. Adamson		
1900	Montevideo GC	A. Dunbar	11 & 9	Mr. Peti		
1899	San Andrés GC	A. Dunbar	14 & 12	Pat Smith		
1898	San Andrés GC	A. Dunbar	9 & 8	D. Leighton		
1897	Lomas A. Club	A. Dunbar	5 & 3	V. G. Scroggie		
1896	Lomas AC	M. Withington 181		George Barker 189		
1895	Lomas AC	George Barker 113		M Fortune 118		
