= Jorge Ledesma =

Argentine golfer (1932–2001)

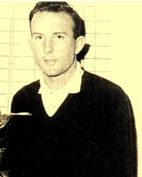

Personal information
- Full name: Jorge Carlos Ledesma
- Nationality: Argentina
- Born: 14 September 1932 Buenos Aires, Argentina
- Died: 12 October 2001 (aged 69) Buenos Aires, Argentina

Career
- Sport: Golf
- Status: Amateur
- Professional wins: 2

Best results in major championships
- Masters Tournament: CUT: 1963
- PGA Championship: DNP
- U.S. Open: DNP
- The Open Championship: DNP

Jorge Carlos Ledesma (14 September 1932 — 12 October 2001) was an Argentine amateur golfer. He is the brother of Pedro Ledesma, who is also an accomplished golfer. Ledesma is known as one of the best amateur golfers in Argentina, being one of only 11 Argentinian golfers, and along with Juan Segura, the only two amateurs, to have played in the Masters Tournament. He also played in the U.S. Amateur.

== Early life ==
In 1932, Ledesma was born in Buenos Aires. He was raised in Mar del Plata, and developed his golfing skills at the Mar del Plata Golf Club beginning at age eight.

== Golf career ==
In 1963, Ledesma won the Argentine Open ahead of Roberto De Vicenzo. The following year he came in third while he also claimed the amateur title at the tournament on nine occasions between 1955 and 1976, including five in a row from 1960. He won Argentine Amateur Championship three times: in 1959, 1966 and 1967. He also finished second in 1962, 1963, and 1974.

Internationally, Ledesma won the 1956 Viña del mar Open in Chile and finished runner-up at the 1967 Brazil Open.

== Personal life ==
In 2001, Ledesma died in Buenos Aires, at age 69.

== Tournament wins ==
- 1952 Gordon Kenneth Cup
- 1955 Amateur Argentine Open, South Open
- 1956 Viña del Mar Open (Chile), South Open, Gordon Kenneth Cup, Gold Cup Uruguay
- 1957 Amateur Argentine Open, Gold Cup Uruguay
- 1959 Argentine Amateur Championship
- 1960 Amateur Argentine Open, Raul Lottero Cup, South Open
- 1961 Amateur Argentine Open, Abierto del Litoral, South Open
- 1962 Amateur Argentine Open, Raul Lottero Cup, Gordon Kenneth Cup, Argentine Masters
- 1963 Amateur Argentine Open, South Open, Gordon Kenneth Cup, Chile Amateur Open, Argentine Open
- 1964 Amateur Argentine Open, North Open, South Open, Gordon Kenneth Cup
- 1965 North Open, Raul Lottero Cup, Gordon Kenneth Cup
- 1966 Porto Alegre Open (Brazil), Raul Lottero Cup, Argentine Amateur Championship, Gordon Kenneth Cup
- 1967 Amateur Argentine Open, Porto Alegre Open (Brazil), Argentine Amateur Championship, Gordon Kenneth Cup, Argentine Masters, Brazil Amateur Open
- 1968 North Open, Raul Lottero Cup, South Open, Gordon Kenneth Cup
- 1970 South Open
- 1971 Raul Lottero Cup
- 1972 South Open
- 1973 Raul Lottero Cup
- 1974 Ledesma-Segura Cup
- 1976 Amateur Argentine Open
- 1980 Ledesma-Segura Cup

== Team appearances ==
Amateur

- Eisenhower Trophy (7): 1958, 1960, 1962, 1964, 1968, 1970, 1974
- South American Cup (Los Andes Cup) (15): 1955(w), 1956(w), 1957(w), 1959(w), 1961(runner up), 1962(w), 1963(runner up), 1964(runner up), 1965(w), 1966(w), 1967(w), 1968, 1969(w), 1973(w), 1979
- Vigil Cup (Argentina): 1959–1982, team winner (10): 1959, 1960, 1961, 1962, 1963, 1964, 1965, 1970, 1978, 1980, individual winner (5): 1960, 1961, 1962, 1964, 1967.
