= 2011 European Senior Tour =

Golf tour season

2011 European Senior Tour season
- Duration: 19 November 2010 – 11 December 2011
- Number of official events: 22
- Most wins: (Australia) Peter Fowler (2) (England) Barry Lane (2) (England) Carl Mason (2)
- Order of Merit: (Australia) Peter Fowler
- Rookie of the Year: (England) Gary Wolstenholme

The 2011 European Senior Tour was the 20th season of the European Senior Tour, the main professional golf tour in Europe for men aged 50 and over.

== Schedule ==
The following table lists official events during the 2011 season.

Date	Tournament	Host country	Purse (€)	Winner (Note: The number in brackets after each winner's name is the number of European Senior Tour events they had won up to and including that tournament. This information is only shown for European Senior Tour members.)	Other tours (Note: JPNSEN − Japan PGA Senior Tour.)	Notes
21 Nov	Handa Australian Senior Open	Australia	A$400,000	(Australia) Peter Senior (1)		New to European Senior Tour
28 Nov	Handa Cup Senior Masters	Japan	¥120,000,000	(Japan) Masahiro Kuramoto (1)	JPNSEN	New to European Senior Tour
12 Dec	Mauritius Commercial Bank Open	Mauritius	280,000	(South Africa) David Frost (1)		
6 Mar	Aberdeen Brunei Senior Masters	Brunei	US$350,000	(South Africa) Chris Williams (1)		
13 Mar	ISPS Handa Senior World Championship	China	US$350,000	(Scotland) Sandy Lyle (1)		New tournament
20 Mar	OKI Open de España Senior	Spain	200,000	(England) Carl Mason (24)		New tournament
29 May	Senior PGA Championship	United States	US$2,000,000	(United States) Tom Watson (n/a)		Senior major championship
5 Jun	ISPS Handa Senior Masters	England	£200,000	(Australia) Peter Fowler (1)		
12 Jun	De Vere Club PGA Seniors Championship	England	£250,000	(Scotland) Andrew Oldcorn (1)		
19 Jun	Berenberg Bank Masters	Germany	400,000	(Wales) Ian Woosnam (4)		
26 Jun	Van Lanschot Senior Open	Netherlands	250,000	(Republic of Ireland) Des Smyth (4)		
3 Jul	Bad Ragaz PGA Seniors Open	Switzerland	250,000	(Australia) Peter Fowler (2)		
24 Jul	The Senior Open Championship	England	US$2,000,000	(United States) Russ Cochran (n/a)		Senior major championship
31 Jul	U.S. Senior Open	United States	US$2,600,000	(United States) Olin Browne (2)		Senior major championship (Note: Official win; unofficial money.)
21 Aug	Cleveland Golf/Srixon Scottish Senior Open	Scotland	£250,000	(England) Barry Lane (2)		
4 Sep	Travis Perkins plc Senior Masters	England	£280,000	(Thailand) Boonchu Ruangkit (5)		
18 Sep	Casa Serena Open	Czech Republic	400,000	(England) Barry Lane (3)		
24 Sep	Cannes Mougins Masters	France	250,000	(Spain) Juan Quirós (4)		
1 Oct	Belas Clube de Campo Senior Open de Portugal	Portugal	300,000	(Wales) Mark Mouland (1)		
16 Oct	Benahavis Senior Masters	Spain	180,000	(England) Carl Mason (25)		
20 Nov	Fubon Senior Open	Taiwan	US$400,000	(Taiwan) Lu Chien-soon (n/a)		New tournament
11 Dec	MCB Tour Championship	Mauritius	400,000	(United States) Tom Lehman (n/a)		Tour Championship

== Order of Merit ==
The Order of Merit was based on prize money won during the season, calculated in Euros.

Position	Player	Prize money (€)
1	(Australia) Peter Fowler	302,327
2	(England) Barry Lane	271,173
3	(Scotland) Andrew Oldcorn	188,981
4	(England) Gary Wolstenholme	181,637
5	(Wales) Ian Woosnam	179,160

== Awards ==
Award	Winner	Ref.
Rookie of the Year	(England) Gary Wolstenholme	
