= Aberdeen Brunei Senior Masters =

Tournament information
- Location: Jerudong, Brunei
- Established: 2009
- Courses: The Empire Hotel & Country Club
- Par: 71
- Length: 6,845 yards (6,259 m)
- Tour: European Senior Tour
- Format: Stroke play
- Prize fund: US$350,000
- Month played: March
- Final year: 2011

Tournament record score
- Aggregate: 199 Boonchu Ruangkit (2010)
- To par: −14 as above

Final champion
- (South Africa) Chris Williams
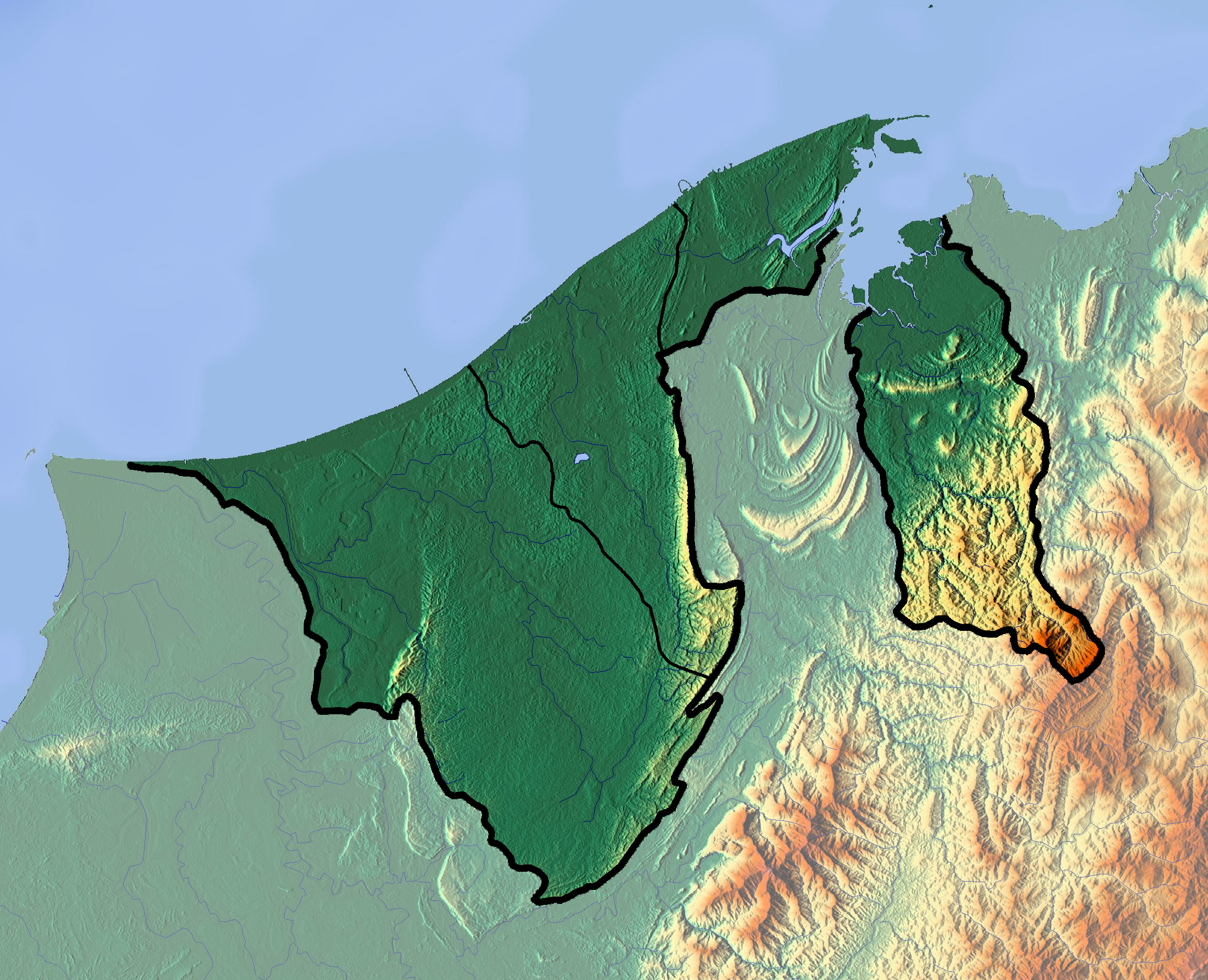
- Location in Brunei

The Aberdeen Brunei Senior Masters was a men's professional golf tournament on the European Senior Tour. It was contested from 2009 to 2011 and was played at The Empire Hotel & Country Club, Jerudong in Brunei. The 2011 event had prize money of $350,000.

== Winners ==
Year	Winner	Score	To par	Margin of victory	Runner-up
2011	(South Africa) Chris Williams	201	−12	1 stroke	(South Korea) Choi Sang-ho
2010	(Thailand) Boonchu Ruangkit	199	−14	Playoff	(Philippines) Frankie Miñoza
2009	(United States) Mike Cunning	206	−7	2 strokes	(Northern Ireland) Jimmy Heggarty
