= 2009 All Thailand Golf Tour =

Golf tour season

2009 All Thailand Golf Tour season
- Duration: 29 January 2009 – 20 December 2009
- Number of official events: 5
- Most wins: (Thailand) Patcharajutar Kongkraphan (2) (Thailand) Thammanoon Sriroj (2)
- Order of Merit (men): (Thailand) Thammanoon Sriroj

The 2009 All Thailand Golf Tour, titled as the 2009 Singha All Thailand Golf Tour for sponsorship reasons, was the 11th season of the All Thailand Golf Tour (formerly the TPC Tour), one of the main professional golf tours in Thailand since it was formed in 1999.

== Singha title sponsorship ==
In March, it was announced that the tour had signed a title sponsorship agreement with Singha, being renamed as the Singha All Thailand Golf Tour.

== Schedule ==
The following tables list official events during the 2009 season.

=== Men's events ===
Date	Tournament	Location	Purse (฿)	Winner (Note: The number in brackets after each winner's name is the number of All Thailand Golf Tour events they had won up to and including that tournament.)	Other tours (Note: ASEAN − ASEAN PGA Tour.)
1 Feb	Singha Masters	Chiang Rai	2,000,000	(Thailand) Thammanoon Sriroj (7)	
5 Apr	Singha Pattaya Open	Chonburi	1,500,000	(Thailand) Kiradech Aphibarnrat (1)	ASEAN
5 Jul	Singha Classic	Nakhon Ratchasima	1,500,000	(Thailand) Thammanoon Sriroj (8)	
19 Sep	B-Ing TPC Championships	Lopbori	1,500,000	(Thailand) Namchok Tantipokhakul (1)	ASEAN
20 Dec	Singha Championship	Nakhon Nayok	1,500,000	(Thailand) Prayad Marksaeng (7)	

=== Women's events ===
Date	Tournament	Location	Purse (฿)	Winner
1 Feb	Singha Masters	Chiang Rai	100,000	(Thailand) Nontaya Srisawang (1)
5 Jul	Singha Classic	Nakhon Ratchasima	100,000	(Thailand) Patcharajutar Kongkraphan (1)
20 Dec	Singha Championship	Nakhon Nayok	100,000	(Thailand) Patcharajutar Kongkraphan (2)

== Order of Merit ==
The Order of Merit was based on prize money won during the season, calculated in Thai baht.

Position	Player	Prize money (฿)
1	(Thailand) Thammanoon Sriroj	656,300
2	(Thailand) Kiradech Aphibarnrat	373,400
3	(Thailand) Namchok Tantipokhakul	313,367
4	(Thailand) Satya Sapaparamai	261,700
5	(Thailand) Prayad Marksaeng	260,633
