= Dutch Senior Open =

Tournament information
- Location: Amsterdam, Netherlands
- Established: 2010
- Course: The International
- Par: 73
- Length: 6,967 yards (6,371 m)
- Tour: European Senior Tour
- Format: Stroke play
- Prize fund: €200,000
- Month played: October
- Final year: 2014

Tournament record score
- Aggregate: 206 George Ryall (2010)
- To par: −10 as above

Final champion
- (Wales) Ian Woosnam
- Location in the Netherlands

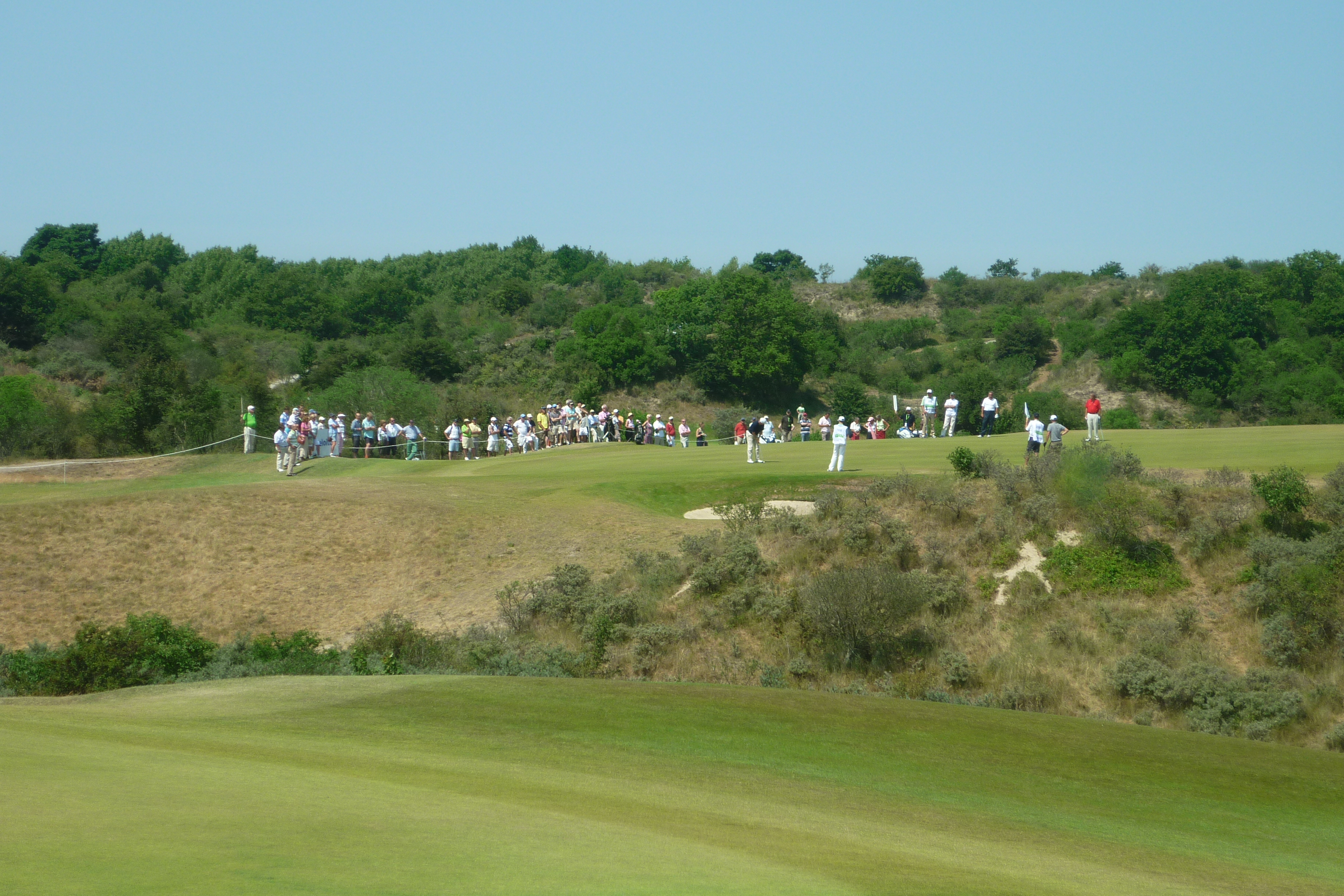
12th hole at Royal Haagsche in 2010

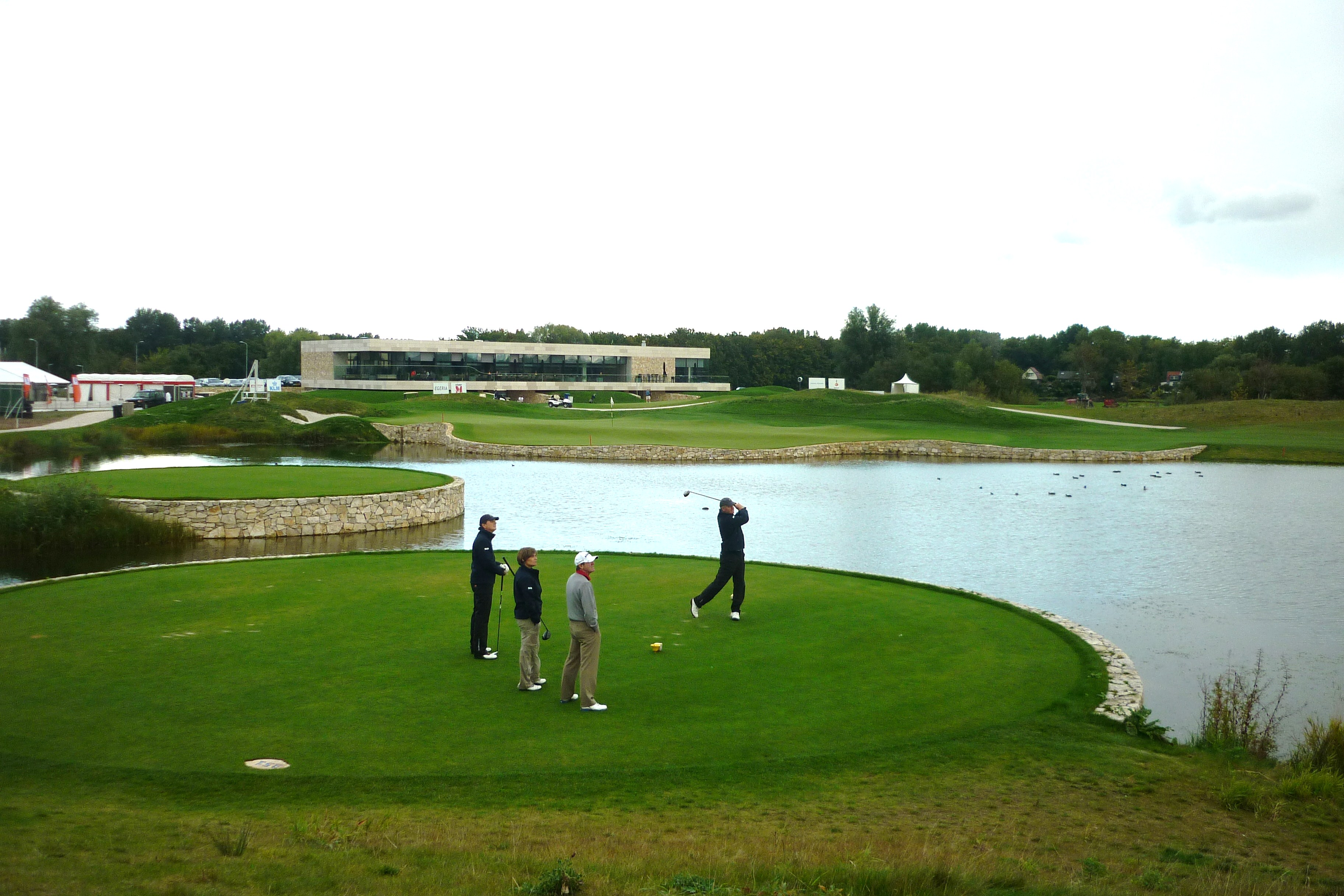
10th tee at The International

The Dutch Senior Open was a men's golf tournament on the European Senior Tour. It was held at the Royal Haagsche Golf & Country Club in The Hague, Netherlands from 2010 to 2012. In 2013 it moved to The International, Badhoevedorp near Amsterdam. It was the first EST event to be held in the Netherlands since the 2001 Legends in Golf.

== Winners ==
Year	Winner	Score	To par	Margin of victory	Runner(s)-up	Venue
Dutch Senior Open
2014	(Wales) Ian Woosnam	208	−11	5 strokes	(England) Philip Golding (England) David J. Russell (England) George Ryall	The International
2013	(England) Simon P. Brown	143 (Note: Shortened to 36 holes due to weather.)	−3	2 strokes	(Scotland) Ross Drummond	The International
Van Lanschot Senior Open
2012	(Japan) Masahiro Kuramoto	216	E	2 strokes	(Scotland) Andrew Oldcorn	Royal Haagsche
2011	(Republic of Ireland) Des Smyth	210	−6	2 strokes	(Australia) Peter Fowler (United States) Tim Thelen	Royal Haagsche
2010	(England) George Ryall	206	−10	1 stroke	(Scotland) Andrew Oldcorn	Royal Haagsche
