= Domingo Hospital =

Spanish golfer

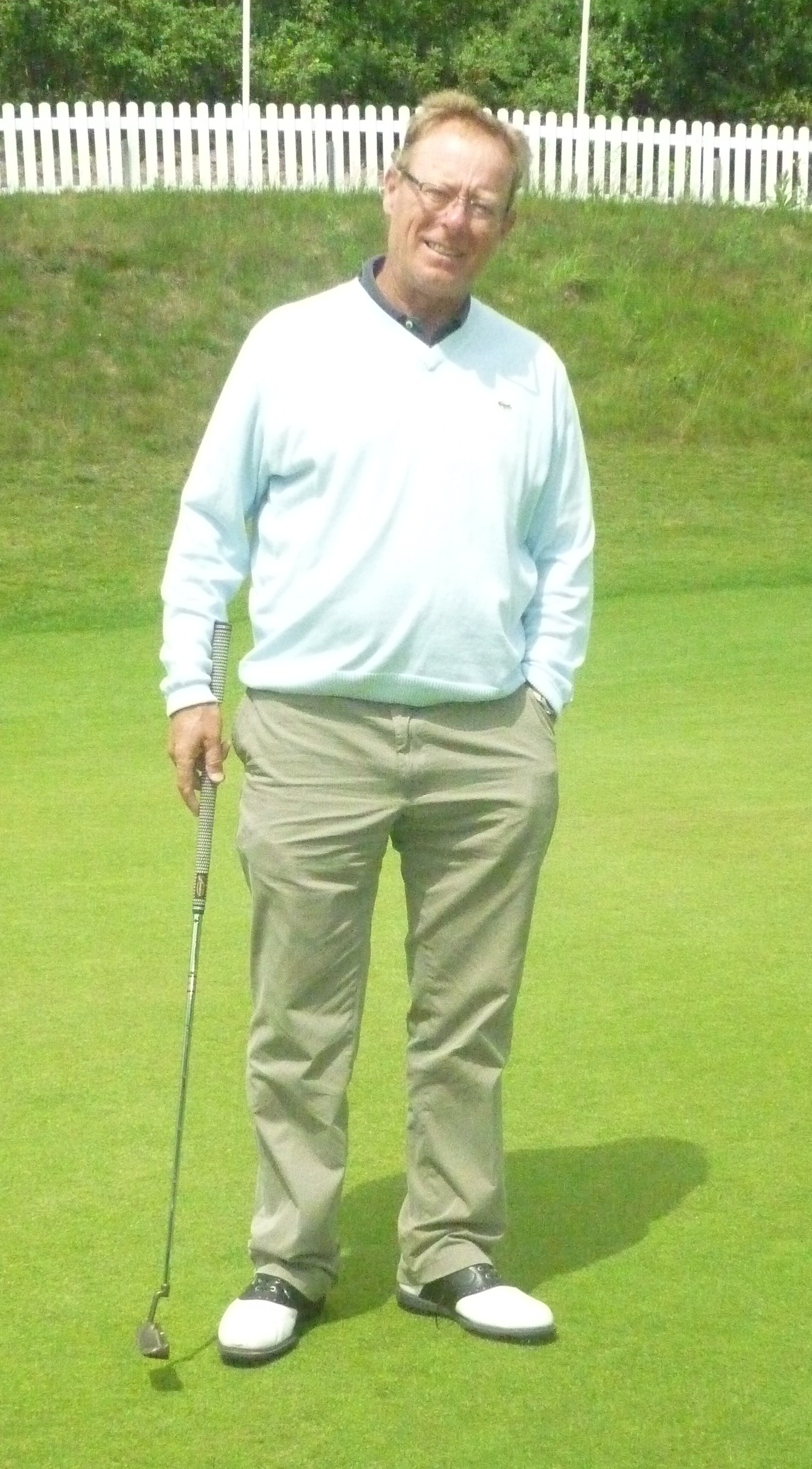

Personal information
- Nationality: Spain
- Born: 20 March 1958 (age 68) Barcelona, Spain
- Height: 1.84 m (6 ft 0 in)
- Weight: 88 kg (194 lb; 13.9 st)
- Spouse: Yolanda (m. 1982)

Career
- Sport: Golf
- Turned professional: 1982
- Current tour: European Senior Tour
- Former tour: European Tour
- Professional wins: 1

Number of wins by tour
- European Senior Tour: 1

Best results in major championships
- Masters Tournament: DNP
- PGA Championship: DNP
- U.S. Open: DNP
- The Open Championship: T38: 1994

Domingo Hospital (born 20 March 1958) is a Spanish professional golfer.

== Career ==
In 1958, Hospital was born in Barcelona, Spain.

In 1982, he turned professional. He spent most of that decade not playing tournament golf but instead teaching in the Swiss ski resort of Davos while sustaining a parallel career as an airline pilot. In the early 1990s, he devoted himself to tournament play and became the European Tour's then-oldest rookie when he came through qualifying school in 1992.

Hospital subsequently played on the tour full-time until 2001. His best result came in his debut season, when he finished joint runner-up at the Madrid Open behind Des Smyth, a result which retained his card in his final event of the year. However, his most consistent season was 1996, when he twice finished third and ended 37th on the Order of Merit.

In 2008, Hospital turned 50 and joined the European Senior Tour, enjoying a successful debut season culminating in a 10th place finish on the Order of Merit. He won his first Senior tournament in 2010 at the Sicilian Senior Open.

== Personal life ==
Hospital's nephew, Agustín Domingo, is also a professional golfer who has played on the European Tour.

== Professional wins (1) ==
=== European Senior Tour wins (1) ===
No.	Date	Tournament	Winning score	Margin of victory	Runner-up
1	24 Oct 2010	Sicilian Senior Open	−5 (70-67-74=211)	Playoff	(Argentina) Horacio Carbonetti

European Senior Tour playoff record (1–0)

No.	Year	Tournament	Opponent	Result
1	2010	Sicilian Senior Open	(Argentina) Horacio Carbonetti	Won with par on first extra hole

== Results in major championships ==
Tournament	1994	1995	1996
The Open Championship	T38		T72

Note: Hospital only played in The Open Championship.

Did not play

"T" = tied
