= Domaine de Terre Blanche =

Golf resort in France

Coordinates: 43.594384°N 6.731397°E

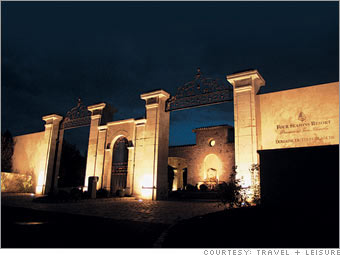
Main entrance

The Terre Blanche Hotel Spa Golf Resort is located at Tourrettes, Var, just southeast of Fayence in the Provence region of France.

The Bouge family owned the estate in the 18th century. Actor Sean Connery bought the property in 1979, comprising the château and its surrounding 266 hectares. He owned the property for 20 years before selling it to German billionaire Dietmar Hopp in 1999. In 2004, Hopp transformed the property into an exclusive resort with luxury properties, two championship golf courses, and a spa.

In 2007, Terre Blanche was ranked fifth in the CNN Money dream vacation home guide. The property was featured by Condé Nast as part of the 2023 Readers' Choice Awards.

Terre Blanche is located 30 to 45 minutes from Cannes, Nice, and Saint-Tropez, and a one-hour drive from Monaco.
