= Boonchu Ruangkit =

Thai professional golfer (born 1956)

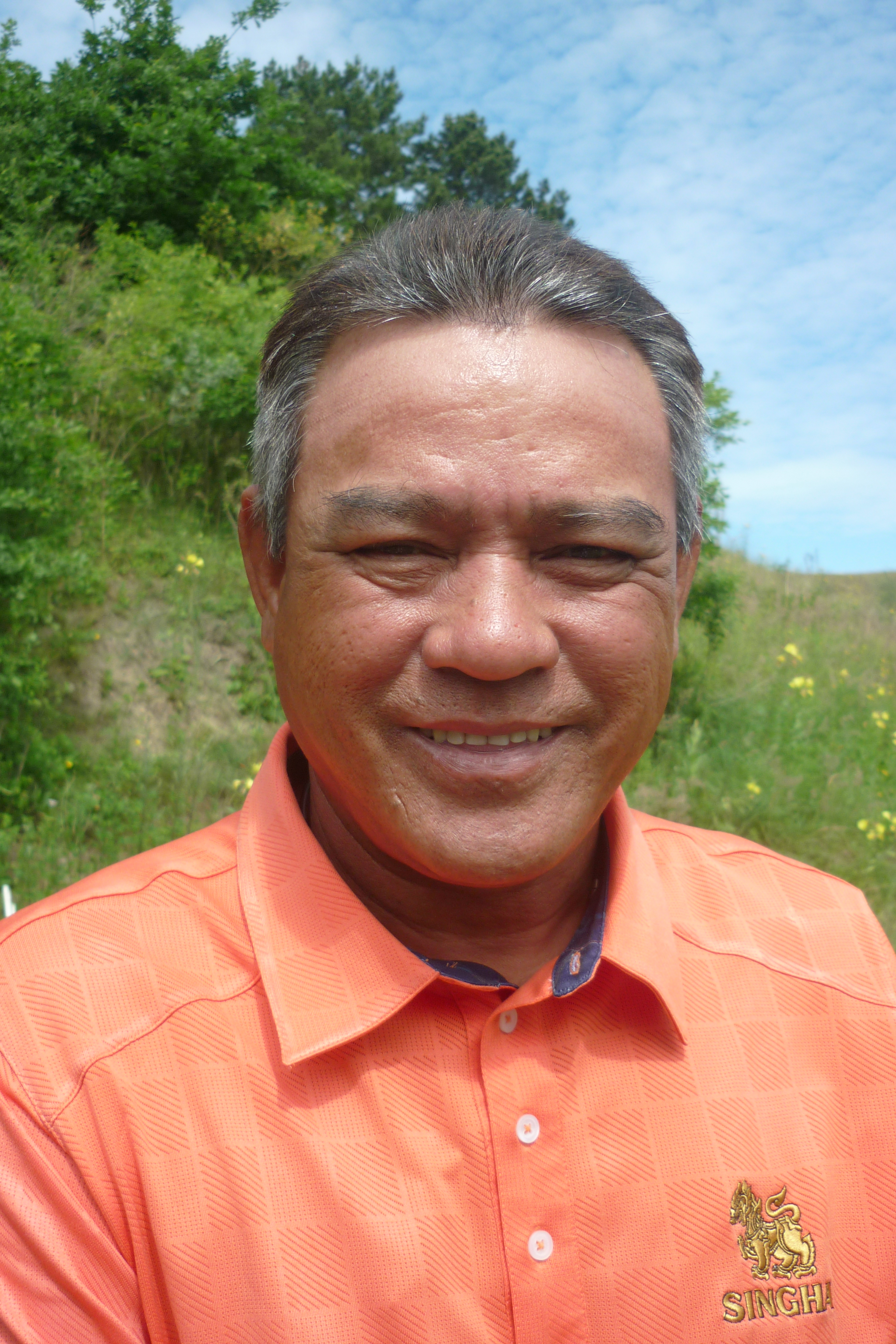

Personal information
- Nationality: Thailand
- Born: 12 May 1956 (age 70) Bangkok, Thailand
- Height: 1.75 m (5 ft 9 in)
- Weight: 85 kg (187 lb; 13.4 st)

Career
- Sport: Golf
- Turned professional: 1986
- Current tour: European Senior Tour
- Former tours: Asian Tour; Champions Tour
- Professional wins: 19

Number of wins by tour
- Asian Tour: 5
- European Senior Tour: 5
- Other: 9

Achievements and awards
- TPC Tour Order of Merit winner: 2006
- European Senior Tour Order of Merit winner: 2010
- European Senior Tour Rookie of the Year: 2010

Boonchu Ruangkit (born 12 May 1956) is a Thai professional golfer who plays on the Champions Tour.

== Early life ==
As a young man, Boonchu tried for a career in kickboxing, but he gave it up after being knocked out cold in his third bout. He made his mark in golf when he won the 1985 Australian Amateur.

== Professional career ==
Boonchu turned professional in 1986. He has won five titles on the Asian Tour since its first modern season in 1995, and has several other victories to his name. He was the runner-up on the Asian Tour Order of Merit in 1995 and also made the top ten in 1998 and 2004. In the latter year he won the Thailand Open for the second time in his career at the age of 47.

In 2006, Boonchu turned 50 and became eligible to play in senior tournaments. He finished first in the 2006 Champions Tour Qualifying School and joined the Champions Tour in 2007. In 2010, he joined the European Senior Tour and won four events (including three straight) and the Order of Merit.

== Amateur wins ==
- 1985 Australian Amateur, Putra Cup (individual and team)

== Professional wins (19) ==
=== Asian Tour wins (5) ===
No.	Date	Tournament	Winning score	Margin of victory	Runner(s)-up
1	1 Oct 1995	Langkawi Open	−15 (67-71-67-68=273)	7 strokes	(Thailand) Jamnian Chitprasong
2	7 Jan 1996 (1995 season)	Myanmar Open	+5 (68-72-76-77=293)	Playoff	(Australia) Jeff Senior
3	29 Sep 1996	Lexus International	−12 (75-69-67-65=276)	Playoff	(United States) Mike Cunning
4	6 Apr 1997	London Myanmar Open (2)	−15 (72-65-68-68=273)	Playoff	(Australia) John Senden
5	25 Jan 2004	Thailand Open	−18 (68-66-69-67=270)	5 strokes	(South Korea) Kim Jong-duck, (Thailand) Prayad Marksaeng

Asian Tour playoff record (3–1)

No.	Year	Tournament	Opponent(s)	Result
1	1996	Myanmar Open	(Australia) Jeff Senior	Won with par on first extra hole
2	1996	Lexus International	(United States) Mike Cunning	Won with birdie on first extra hole
3	1997	London Myanmar Open	(Australia) John Senden	Won with birdie on first extra hole
4	2009	Brunei Open	(Australia) Darren Beck, (India) Gaganjeet Bhullar	Beck won with birdie on third extra hole Ruangkit eliminated by par on second hole

=== Asia Golf Circuit wins (1) ===
No.	Date	Tournament	Winning score	Margin of victory	Runners-up
1	5 Apr 1992	Thai International Thailand Open	−13 (70-69-66-70=275)	4 strokes	(Australia) Richard Backwell, (Canada) Rémi Bouchard, (Thailand) Thaworn Wiratchant

=== TPC Tour wins (6) ===
- 2000 TPC Championships
- 2002 TPC Championships
- 2003 Singha Classic
- 2004 Chevrolet Championship
- 2006 Singha Masters, Singha E-San Open

=== Other wins (1) ===
- 1998 Mercuries Masters (Taiwan)

=== European Senior Tour wins (5) ===
No.	Date	Tournament	Winning score	Margin of victory	Runner(s)-up
1	7 Mar 2010	Aberdeen Brunei Senior Masters	−14 (64-69-66=199)	Playoff	(Philippines) Frankie Miñoza
2	14 Mar 2010	Chang Thailand Senior Masters	−21 (64-66-65=195)	11 strokes	(Thailand) Jamnian Chitprasong, (Philippines) Frankie Miñoza, (Japan) Katsuyoshi Tomori
3	28 Mar 2010	Berenberg Bank Masters	−3 (69-78-69=216)	3 strokes	(South Africa) Bobby Lincoln, (Scotland) Sam Torrance
4	17 Oct 2010	Benahavis Senior Masters	−16 (68-65-64=197)	7 strokes	(England) John Gould, (England) Carl Mason
5	4 Sep 2011	Travis Perkins plc Senior Masters	−9 (68-68-71=207)	4 strokes	(Scotland) Gordon Brand Jnr, (England) Roger Chapman, (England) Barry Lane

European Senior Tour playoff record (1–0)

No.	Year	Tournament	Opponent	Result
1	2010	Aberdeen Brunei Senior Masters	(Philippines) Frankie Miñoza	Won with par on second extra hole

=== Japan PGA Senior Tour wins (1) ===
No.	Date	Tournament	Winning score	Margin of victory	Runner-up
1	1 Jun 2013	ISPS Handa Cup Satsukibare Senior Masters	−3 (71-70=141)	Playoff	(Japan) Kiyoshi Maita

== Team appearances ==
Amateur

- Eisenhower Trophy (representing Thailand): 1984

Professional

- Dunhill Cup (representing Thailand): 1988, 1990, 1991, 1992
- World Cup (representing Thailand): 1988, 1989, 1994
- Dynasty Cup (representing Asia): 2005 (winners)

== See also ==
- List of golfers with most Asian Tour wins
- List of golfers with most European Senior Tour wins
