= 2004 Masters Tournament =

- Front cover of the 2004 Masters Journal

Tournament information
- Dates: April 8–11, 2004
- Location: Augusta, Georgia; 33.503°N 82.020°W
- Course: Augusta National Golf Club
- Organized by: Augusta National Golf Club
- Tours: PGA Tour; European Tour; Japan Golf Tour

Statistics
- Par: 72
- Length: 7,290 yards (6,666 m)
- Field: 93 players, 44 after cut
- Cut: 148 (+4)
- Prize fund: US$6,000,000
- Winner's share: $1,170,000

Champion
- (United States) Phil Mickelson
- 279 (−9)

Location map
- Location in the United States Location in Georgia

The 2004 Masters Tournament was the 68th Masters Tournament, held April 8–11 at Augusta National Golf Club in Augusta, Georgia. Phil Mickelson, 33, won his first major championship with a birdie on the final hole to win by one stroke over runner-up Ernie Els. The purse was $6.0 million and the winner's share was $1.17 million.

This was the 50th consecutive and final Masters appearance for four-time champion Arnold Palmer.

== Playoff alteration ==
Prior to this Masters, the sudden-death playoff was changed to begin on the 18th hole and alternate with the 10th hole. This new starting point was first used the following year in 2005. When the playoff format was changed to sudden-death for 1976, it began at the 10th hole, then went to the 11th, and was first used in 1979. Prior to 1976, playoffs at Augusta were full 18-hole rounds on Monday, and the last was won by Billy Casper in 1970. The exception was the first playoff in 1935, which was 36 holes.

== Course ==
Hole	Name	Yards	Par	Hole	Name	Yards	Par
1	Tea Olive	435	4	10	Camellia	495	4
2	Pink Dogwood	575	5	11	White Dogwood	490	4
3	Flowering Peach	350	4	12	Golden Bell	155	3
4	Flowering Crab Apple	205	3	13	Azalea	510	5
5	Magnolia	455	4	14	Chinese Fir	440	4
6	Juniper	180	3	15	Firethorn	500	5
7	Pampas	410	4	16	Redbud	170	3
8	Yellow Jasmine	570	5	17	Nandina	425	4
9	Carolina Cherry	460	4	18	Holly	465	4
Out		3,640	36	In		3,650	36
				Total		7,290	72

== Field ==
1. Masters champions

Tommy Aaron, Charles Coody, Fred Couples (14,16,17), Ben Crenshaw, Nick Faldo, Raymond Floyd, Bernhard Langer, Sandy Lyle, Larry Mize, Jack Nicklaus, José María Olazábal (10), Mark O'Meara (10), Arnold Palmer, Gary Player, Vijay Singh (10,12,14,15,16,17), Craig Stadler, Tom Watson, Mike Weir (10,11,14,15,16,17), Tiger Woods (2,3,4,10,12,14,15,16,17), Ian Woosnam, Fuzzy Zoeller

- George Archer, Seve Ballesteros, Gay Brewer, Jack Burke Jr., Billy Casper, Doug Ford, Bob Goalby, and Byron Nelson did not play.

2. U.S. Open champions (last five years)

Retief Goosen (10,14,16,17)

- Jim Furyk (10,11,14,16,17) did not play.

3. The Open champions (last five years)

Ben Curtis (12,16,17), Ernie Els (10,11,14,16,17), Paul Lawrie (10)

- David Duval did not play.

4. PGA champions (last five years)

Rich Beem (10,16), Shaun Micheel (13,14,16,17), David Toms (10,11,14,16,17)

5. The Players Championship winners (last three years)

Davis Love III (10,12,14,15,16,17), Craig Perks, Adam Scott (15,16,17)

6. U.S. Amateur champion and runner-up

Nick Flanagan (a), Casey Wittenberg (a)

7. The Amateur champion

Gary Wolstenholme (a)

8. U.S. Amateur Public Links champion

Brandt Snedeker (a)

9. U.S. Mid-Amateur champion

Nathan Smith (a)

10. Top 16 players and ties from the 2003 Masters

Jonathan Byrd, Ángel Cabrera, K. J. Choi (14,16,17), Tim Clark (13), Jeff Maggert, Len Mattiace, Phil Mickelson (14,16,17), Scott Verplank (14,16,17)

11. Top eight players and ties from the 2003 U.S. Open

Freddie Jacobson (16,17), Stephen Leaney (16,17), Kenny Perry (14,16,17), Nick Price (14,16,17), Justin Rose

12. Top four players and ties from the 2003 Open Championship

Thomas Bjørn (16,17)

13. Top four players and ties from 2003 PGA Championship

Chad Campbell (14,15,16,17), Alex Čejka (16,17)

14. Top 40 players from the 2003 PGA Tour money list

Robert Allenby (16,17), Stuart Appleby (15,16,17), Briny Baird, Stewart Cink (17), Chris DiMarco (16,17), Bob Estes (16), Brad Faxon (16,17), Steve Flesch (17), Fred Funk (16,17), Jay Haas (16,17), Tim Herron (16), Charles Howell III (16,17), Jonathan Kaye (15,16,17), Jerry Kelly (16,17), Justin Leonard (16,17), J. L. Lewis, Shigeki Maruyama (16,17), Rocco Mediate (16,17), Tim Petrovic, Chris Riley (16,17), John Rollins, Jeff Sluman, Kirk Triplett (17), Bob Tway (16,17)

15. Top 10 players from the 2004 PGA Tour money list on March 28

John Daly

16. Top 50 players from the final 2003 world ranking

Michael Campbell, Paul Casey (17), Darren Clarke (17), Sergio García (17), Pádraig Harrington (17), Toshimitsu Izawa, Peter Lonard (17), Colin Montgomerie (17), Ian Poulter (17), Phillip Price, Eduardo Romero

17. Top 50 players from world ranking published March 28

Brian Davis, Todd Hamilton, Trevor Immelman, Craig Parry

18. Special foreign invitation

Zhang Lianwei

== Round-by-round results ==
=== First round ===
Thursday, April 8, 2004
Friday, April 9, 2004

23-year-old Englishman Justin Rose posted a five-under 67 to lead after the first round. Americans Chris DiMarco and Jay Haas shot 69 (−3) and two-time U.S. Open champion Ernie Els was among a group tied for fourth with 70 (−2). Among the seven players tied at 71 (−1) was two-time Masters champion, José María Olazábal. Phil Mickelson shot an even-par 72, and three-time Masters champion Tiger Woods shot a 75 (+3). The winner of the previous major (2003 PGA Championship), Shaun Micheel, was at even-par 72. Play was suspended for roughly two hours due to rain, so 18 players completed their opening round on Friday morning.

Place	Player	Score	To par
1	(England) Justin Rose	67	−5
T2	(United States) Chris DiMarco	69	−3
T2	(United States) Jay Haas	69	−3
T4	(Germany) Alex Čejka	70	−2
T4	(Northern Ireland) Darren Clarke	70	−2
T4	(South Africa) Ernie Els	70	−2
T4	(United States) Chris Riley	70	−2
T8	(South Korea) K. J. Choi	71	−1
T8	(United States) Charles Howell III	71	−1
T8	(Germany) Bernhard Langer	71	−1
T8	(Scotland) Colin Montgomerie	71	−1
T8	(Spain) José María Olazábal	71	−1
T8	(Wales) Phillip Price	71	−1
T8	(United States) Kirk Triplett	71	−1

=== Second round ===
Friday, April 9, 2004

First round leader Rose put together another good round (71) to take the 36-hole lead at 138 (−6). Olazábal shot a 69 to close within two strokes of the lead in a tie for second with Alex Čejka, who shot 70. Mickelson, trying to remove the best player never to win a major championship label, moved into a share of fourth with a 69, alongside K. J. Choi. Davis Love III was one of two to shoot the round of the day with a 67 (−5), which moved him into a tie for sixth with Els, DiMarco, Charles Howell III, and 1992 champion Fred Couples. Most notables made the cut at 148 (+4), but among those failing to advance were defending champion Mike Weir and Ben Curtis, the 2003 Open Champion.

Place	Player	Score	To par
1	(England) Justin Rose	67-71=138	−6
T2	(Germany) Alex Čejka	70-70=140	−4
T2	(Spain) José María Olazábal	71-69=140	−4
T4	(South Korea) K. J. Choi	71-70=141	−3
T4	(United States) Phil Mickelson	72-69=141	−3
T6	(United States) Fred Couples	73-69=142	−2
T6	(United States) Chris DiMarco	69-73=142	−2
T6	(South Africa) Ernie Els	70-72=142	−2
T6	(United States) Charles Howell III	71-71=142	−2
T6	(United States) Davis Love III	75-67=142	−2

Amateurs: Snedeker (+4), Wittenberg (+4), Smith (+6), Flanagan (+8), Wolstenholme (+9).

=== Third round ===
Saturday, April 10, 2004

Mickelson moved from fourth to a share of the 54-hole lead with a three-under 69, while the top three golfers after round two collapsed. Rose shot an 81, Olazábal a 79, and Čejka a 78. This collective meltdown by the top three allowed Mickelson and DiMarco to rise to the top. DiMarco finished tied for the 54-hole lead with a four-under 68. Paul Casey put together a 68 as well to move within two strokes of the co-leaders at the end of the day. Els continued his steady play with a one-under 71 to move into a three-way tie for fourth. Kirk Triplett and Freddie Jacobson put themselves in contention at seventh and eighth, respectively.

Place	Player	Score	To par
T1	(United States) Chris DiMarco	69-73-68=210	−6
T1	(United States) Phil Mickelson	72-69-69=210	−6
3	(England) Paul Casey	75-69-68=212	−4
T4	(South Korea) K. J. Choi	71-70-72=213	−3
T4	(South Africa) Ernie Els	70-72-71=213	−3
T4	(Germany) Bernhard Langer	71-73-69=213	−3
7	(United States) Kirk Triplett	71-74-69=214	−2
8	(Sweden) Freddie Jacobson	74-74-67=215	−1
T9	(United States) Stewart Cink	74-73-69=216	E
T9	(United States) Fred Couples	73-69-74=216	E
T9	(United States) Jay Haas	69-75-72=216	E
T9	(Republic of Ireland) Pádraig Harrington	74-74-68=216	E
T9	(United States) Davis Love III	75-67-74=216	E
T9	(Zimbabwe) Nick Price	72-73-71=216	E

=== Final round ===
Sunday, April 11, 2004

==== Summary ====
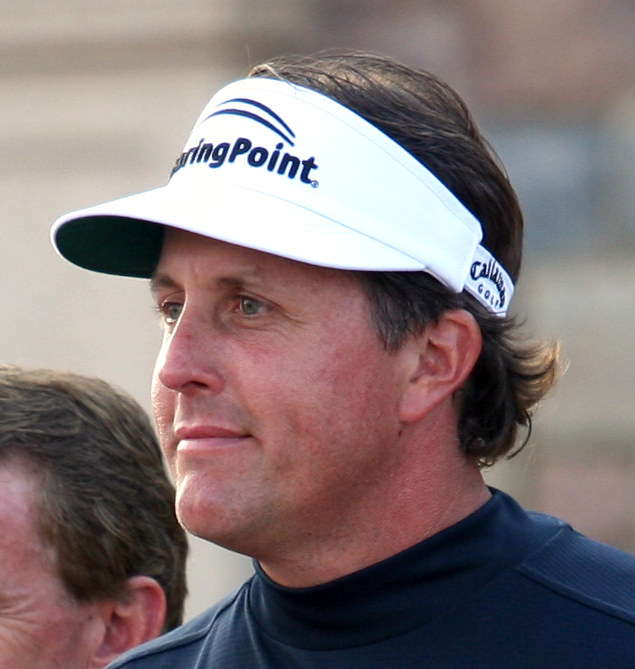
Phil Mickelson won his first Masters title

External videos
- Full final round coverage on CBS on YouTube

In one of the most exciting back nines in Masters history, Mickelson dueled Els to claim his first major championship. Mickelson shot a final round 69, sealed with an 18-foot (5 m) birdie on the 18th green to win by a stroke. Playing two groups ahead of Mickelson, Els started the day at −3 and posted a 67 (−5). As Mickelson approached the final hole, Els' total of 280 (−8) appeared enough to at least get him into a playoff. Els stumbled out of the gate with two bogeys in his first five holes, but quickly regained his form. He collected two eagles on his round, at the par-5 8th and 13th holes. Els also connected on a birdie at the 15th to get him to −8. Seeing his first major possibly slip away with a 38 (+2) on his front nine, Mickelson had to match Els' fire on the back nine, and shot a bogey-free 31, with birdies on five of the final seven holes. Mickelson birdied the par-3 12th and par-5 13th. He briefly tied Els with his third consecutive birdie at the par-4 14th, then had a disappointing par on the par-5 15th. At the par-3 16th, Mickelson put his tee shot 20 feet (6 m) above the pin and holed the dramatic putt to tie for the lead. He remained tied heading to the final tee, and when his approach shot landed on the green, a winning putt was before him. As Mickelson sunk the putt, he jumped for joy as he won his first major title.

K. J. Choi finished third, which was his best major finish, with a final round 69 to total 282 (−6). Sergio García shot the round of the tournament with a 66 (−6) to tie for fourth with two-time Masters champion Bernhard Langer. Four major champions, including two former Masters champions (Vijay Singh, Couples, Love, and Nick Price) were in the group who finished tied for sixth at 286 (−2). Woods' streak of not winning a major extended to seven with a disappointing 290 (+2), the same score tallied by first and second round leader Rose.

==== Final leaderboard ====
Champion
Silver Cup winner (low amateur)
(a) = amateur
(c) = past champion

Top 10
Place	Player	Score	To par	Money (US$)
1	(United States) Phil Mickelson	72-69-69-69=279	−9	1,170,000
2	(South Africa) Ernie Els	70-72-71-67=280	−8	702,000
3	(South Korea) K. J. Choi	71-70-72-69=282	−6	442,000
T4	(Spain) Sergio García	72-72-75-66=285	−3	286,000
T4	(Germany) Bernhard Langer (c)	71-73-69-72=285	−3	286,000
T6	(England) Paul Casey	75-69-68-74=286	−2	189,893
T6	(United States) Fred Couples (c)	73-69-74-70=286	−2	189,893
T6	(United States) Chris DiMarco	69-73-68-76=286	−2	189,893
T6	(United States) Davis Love III	75-67-74-70=286	−2	189,893
T6	(Zimbabwe) Nick Price	72-73-71-70=286	−2	189,893
T6	(Fiji) Vijay Singh (c)	75-73-69-69=286	−2	189,893
T6	(United States) Kirk Triplett	71-74-69-72=286	−2	189,893

Leaderboard below the top 10
Place	Player	Score	To par	Money ($)
T13	(South Africa) Retief Goosen	75-73-70-70=288	E	125,667
T13	(Republic of Ireland) Pádraig Harrington	74-74-68-72=288	E	125,667
T13	(United States) Charles Howell III	71-71-76-70=288	E	125,667
T13	(United States) Casey Wittenberg (a)	76-72-71-69=288	E	0
T17	(United States) Stewart Cink	74-73-69-73=289	+1	97,500
T17	(United States) Steve Flesch	76-67-77-69=289	+1	97,500
T17	(United States) Jay Haas	69-75-72-73=289	+1	97,500
T17	(Sweden) Freddie Jacobson	74-74-67-74=289	+1	97,500
T17	(Australia) Stephen Leaney	76-71-73-69=289	+1	97,500
T22	(Australia) Stuart Appleby	73-74-73-70=290	+2	70,200
T22	(United States) Shaun Micheel	72-76-72-70=290	+2	70,200
T22	(England) Justin Rose	67-71-81-71=290	+2	70,200
T22	(United States) Tiger Woods (c)	75-69-75-71=290	+2	70,200
26	(Germany) Alex Čejka	70-70-78-73=291	+3	57,200
T27	(United States) Mark O'Meara (c)	73-70-75-74=292	+4	51,025
T27	(United States) Bob Tway	75-71-74-72=292	+4	51,025
29	(United States) Scott Verplank	74-71-76-72=293	+5	48,100
30	(Spain) José María Olazábal (c)	71-69-79-75=294	+6	46,150
T31	(United States) Bob Estes	76-72-73-74=295	+7	41,275
T31	(United States) Brad Faxon	72-76-76-71=295	+7	41,275
T31	(United States) Jerry Kelly	74-72-73-76=295	+7	41,275
T31	(England) Ian Poulter	75-73-74-73=295	+7	41,275
T35	(United States) Justin Leonard	76-72-72-76=296	+8	35,913
T35	(Wales) Phillip Price	71-76-73-76=296	+8	35,913
T37	(Scotland) Paul Lawrie	77-70-73-77=297	+9	32,663
T37	(Scotland) Sandy Lyle (c)	72-74-75-76=297	+9	32,663
39	(Argentina) Eduardo Romero	74-73-74-77=298	+10	30,550
40	(United States) Todd Hamilton	77-71-76-75=299	+11	29,250
T41	(United States) Tim Petrovic	72-75-75-78=300	+12	27,950
T41	(United States) Brandt Snedeker (a)	73-75-75-77=300	+12	0
43	(United States) Jeff Sluman	73-70-82-77=302	+14	26,650
44	(United States) Chris Riley	70-78-78-78=304	+16	25,350
CUT	(Australia) Robert Allenby	73-76=149	+5	
CUT	(New Zealand) Michael Campbell	76-73=149	+5	
CUT	(Northern Ireland) Darren Clarke	70-79=149	+5	
CUT	(United States) Ben Crenshaw (c)	74-75=149	+5	
CUT	(United States) John Daly	78-71=149	+5	
CUT	(United States) Raymond Floyd (c)	73-76=149	+5	
CUT	(United States) J. L. Lewis	77-72=149	+5	
CUT	(Australia) Peter Lonard	74-75=149	+5	
CUT	(New Zealand) Craig Perks	76-73=149	+5	
CUT	(United States) John Rollins	74-75=149	+5	
CUT	(United States) Craig Stadler (c)	74-75=149	+5	
CUT	(Canada) Mike Weir (c)	79-70=149	+5	
CUT	(China) Zhang Lianwei	77-72=149	+5	
CUT	(United States) Briny Baird	77-73=150	+6	
CUT	(United States) Rich Beem	77-73=150	+6	
CUT	(United States) Ben Curtis	73-77=150	+6	
CUT	(United States) Fred Funk	80-70=150	+6	
CUT	(United States) Jeff Maggert	78-72=150	+6	
CUT	(United States) Larry Mize (c)	76-74=150	+6	
CUT	(United States) Jack Nicklaus (c)	75-75=150	+6	
CUT	(Australia) Craig Parry	74-76=150	+6	
CUT	(United States) Nathan Smith (a)	78-72=150	+6	
CUT	(Argentina) Ángel Cabrera	74-77=151	+7	
CUT	(England) Nick Faldo (c)	76-75=151	+7	
CUT	(United States) Jonathan Kaye	79-72=151	+7	
CUT	(United States) Len Mattiace	76-75=151	+7	
CUT	(United States) Rocco Mediate	75-76=151	+7	
CUT	(Scotland) Colin Montgomerie	71-80=151	+7	
CUT	(United States) David Toms	78-73=151	+7	
CUT	(Wales) Ian Woosnam (c)	76-75=151	+7	
CUT	(Australia) Nick Flanagan (a)	78-74=152	+8	
CUT	(Japan) Toshimitsu Izawa	76-76=152	+8	
CUT	(United States) Kenny Perry	74-78=152	+8	
CUT	(United States) Tom Watson (c)	76-76=152	+8	
CUT	(United States) Jonathan Byrd	79-74=153	+9	
CUT	(United States) Chad Campbell	76-77=153	+9	
CUT	(South Africa) Trevor Immelman	77-76=153	+9	
CUT	(Japan) Shigeki Maruyama	82-71=153	+9	
CUT	(Australia) Adam Scott	80-73=153	+9	
CUT	(England) Gary Wolstenholme (a)	77-76=153	+9	
CUT	(South Africa) Tim Clark	73-81=154	+10	
CUT	(United States) Tim Herron	80-74=154	+10	
CUT	(England) Brian Davis	82-73=155	+11	
CUT	(Denmark) Thomas Bjørn	80-77=157	+13	
CUT	(United States) Fuzzy Zoeller (c)	79-81=160	+16	
CUT	(South Africa) Gary Player (c)	82-80=162	+18	
CUT	(United States) Charles Coody (c)	88-79=167	+23	
CUT	(United States) Arnold Palmer (c)	84-84=168	+24	
CUT	(United States) Tommy Aaron (c)	87-83=170	+26	

==== Scorecard ====
Hole	1	2	3	4	5	6	7	8	9	10	11	12	13	14	15	16	17	18
Par	4	5	4	3	4	3	4	5	4	4	4	3	5	4	5	3	4	4
(United States) Mickelson	−6	−7	−6	−6	−5	−4	−4	−4	−4	−4	−4	−5	−6	−7	−7	−8	−8	−9
(South Africa) Els	−3	−4	−3	−3	−2	−2	−3	−5	−5	−5	−5	−5	−7	−7	−8	−8	−8	−8
(South Korea) Choi	−3	−3	−3	−3	−3	−3	−2	−2	−1	−1	−3	−3	−4	−5	−5	−6	−6	−6
(Spain) García	+3	+3	+3	+3	+3	+5	+4	+3	+2	+2	+2	+1	E	+1	−1	−2	−3	−3
(Germany) Langer	−4	−5	−5	−4	−4	−4	−3	−4	−4	−4	−4	−4	−4	−5	−3	−4	−3	−3
(England) Casey	−4	−4	−4	−4	−4	−3	−3	−4	−3	−3	−3	−2	−2	−3	−3	−3	−2	−2
(United States) DiMarco	−6	−7	−6	−5	−5	−3	−2	−3	−3	−3	−3	−3	−4	−4	−4	−4	−4	−2
(United States) Triplett	−2	−2	−1	E	E	+1	E	−1	−1	−1	E	E	−1	−1	E	−2	−2	−2

Cumulative tournament scores, relative to par

Eagle	Birdie	Bogey	Double bogey

== Quotes ==
- "Is it his time? YES! At long last!" – Jim Nantz's (CBS Sports) call as Mickelson sunk his birdie putt on the 18th hole to defeat Ernie Els and win the tournament.
