= 2003 European Tour =

Golf tour season

2003 European Tour season
- Duration: 21 November 2002 – 2 November 2003
- Number of official events: 45
- Most wins: (South Africa) Ernie Els (4)
- Order of Merit: (South Africa) Ernie Els
- Golfer of the Year: (South Africa) Ernie Els
- Sir Henry Cotton Rookie of the Year: (Republic of Ireland) Peter Lawrie

The 2003 European Tour was the 32nd season of the European Tour, the main professional golf tour in Europe since its inaugural season in 1972.

== Changes for 2003 ==
There were four new tournaments to the European Tour in 2003, the Nordic Open and three dual-ranking events, the Aa St Omer Open, BMW Russian Open and Mallorca Classic. Lost from the tour schedule were the English Open, Great North Open and the dual-ranking North West of Ireland Open.

== Schedule ==
The following table lists official events during the 2003 season.

Date	Tournament	Host country	Purse	Winner (Note: The number in brackets after each winner's name is the number of European Tour events they had won up to and including that tournament. This information is only shown for European Tour members and are inclusive of the three United States-based major championships which were included on the schedule for the first time in 1998, with earlier editions having retrospectively been recognised as official tour wins.)	OWGR points	Other tours (Note: AFR − Sunshine Tour; ANZ − PGA Tour of Australasia; ASA − Asian PGA Tour; CHA − Challenge Tour.)	Notes
24 Nov	BMW Asian Open	Taiwan	US$1,500,000	(Republic of Ireland) Pádraig Harrington (6)	16	ASA	
1 Dec	Omega Hong Kong Open	Hong Kong	US$700,000	(Sweden) Freddie Jacobson (1)	16	ASA	
12 Jan	South African Airways Open	South Africa	£500,000	(South Africa) Trevor Immelman (1)	32	AFR (Note: Sunshine Tour flagship event)	
19 Jan	Dunhill Championship	South Africa	£500,000	(England) Mark Foster (1)	18	AFR	
26 Jan	Caltex Masters	Singapore	US$900,000	(China) Zhang Lianwei (1)	20	ASA	
2 Feb	Heineken Classic	Australia	A$2,000,000	(South Africa) Ernie Els (12)	30	ANZ	
9 Feb	ANZ Championship	Australia	A$1,750,000	(England) Paul Casey (2)	30	ANZ	
16 Feb	Johnnie Walker Classic	Australia	£1,000,000	(South Africa) Ernie Els (13)	44	ANZ, ASA	
23 Feb	Carlsberg Malaysian Open	Malaysia	US$1,100,000	(India) Arjun Atwal (2)	20	ASA	
2 Mar	WGC-Accenture Match Play Championship	United States	US$6,000,000	(United States) Tiger Woods (n/a)	76		World Golf Championship
9 Mar	Dubai Desert Classic	UAE	US$2,000,000	(Netherlands) Robert-Jan Derksen (1)	30		
16 Mar	Qatar Masters	Qatar	US$1,500,000	(South Africa) Darren Fichardt (2)	24		
23 Mar	Madeira Island Open	Portugal	€600,000	(Wales) Bradley Dredge (1)	24	CHA	
13 Apr	Masters Tournament	United States	US$6,000,000	(Canada) Mike Weir (n/a)	100		Major championship
20 Apr	Algarve Open de Portugal	Portugal	€1,250,000	(Sweden) Freddie Jacobson (2)	24		
27 Apr	Canarias Open de España	Spain	€1,750,000	(England) Kenneth Ferrie (1)	24		
4 May	Italian Open Telecom Italia	Italy	€1,100,000	(Sweden) Mathias Grönberg (4)	24		
11 May	Benson & Hedges International Open	England	£1,100,000	(England) Paul Casey (3)	42		
18 May	Deutsche Bank - SAP Open TPC of Europe	Germany	€2,700,000	(Republic of Ireland) Pádraig Harrington (7)	48		
25 May	Volvo PGA Championship	England	€3,500,000	(Spain) Ignacio Garrido (2)	64		Flagship event
1 Jun	Celtic Manor Resort Wales Open	Wales	£1,500,000	(England) Ian Poulter (4)	24		
8 Jun	Daily Telegraph Damovo British Masters	England	£1,500,000	(England) Greg Owen (1)	24		
15 Jun	Aa St Omer Open	France	€400,000	(Australia) Brett Rumford (1)	16	CHA	New to European Tour
15 Jun	U.S. Open	United States	US$6,000,000	(United States) Jim Furyk (n/a)	100		Major championship
22 Jun	Diageo Championship at Gleneagles	Scotland	£1,200,000	(Denmark) Søren Kjeldsen (1)	24		
29 Jun	Open de France	France	€2,500,000	(England) Philip Golding (1)	24		
6 Jul	Smurfit European Open	Ireland	£2,000,000	(Wales) Phillip Price (3)	44		
13 Jul	Barclays Scottish Open	Scotland	£2,200,000	(South Africa) Ernie Els (14)	50		
20 Jul	The Open Championship	England	£3,900,000	(United States) Ben Curtis (1)	100		Major championship
27 Jul	Nissan Irish Open	Ireland	€1,800,000	(New Zealand) Michael Campbell (6)	24		
3 Aug	Scandic Carlsberg Scandinavian Masters	Sweden	€1,900,000	(Australia) Adam Scott (4)	24		
10 Aug	Nordic Open	Denmark	€1,600,000	(England) Ian Poulter (5)	24		New tournament
17 Aug	BMW Russian Open	Russia	€400,000	(Australia) Marcus Fraser (1)	16	CHA	New to European Tour
17 Aug	PGA Championship	United States	US$6,000,000	(United States) Shaun Micheel (n/a)	100		Major championship
24 Aug	WGC-NEC Invitational	United States	US$6,000,000	(Northern Ireland) Darren Clarke (10)	78		World Golf Championship
31 Aug	BMW International Open	Germany	€1,800,000	(England) Lee Westwood (15)	30		
7 Sep	Omega European Masters	Switzerland	€1,600,000	(South Africa) Ernie Els (15)	30		
14 Sep	Trophée Lancôme	France	€1,800,000	(South Africa) Retief Goosen (9)	26		
21 Sep	Linde German Masters	Germany	€3,000,000	(South Korea) K. J. Choi (n/a)	48		
28 Sep	Dunhill Links Championship	Scotland	US$5,000,000	(England) Lee Westwood (16)	52		Pro-Am
5 Oct	WGC-American Express Championship	United States	US$6,000,000	(United States) Tiger Woods (n/a)	76		World Golf Championship
12 Oct	Dutch Open	Netherlands	€1,000,000	(Netherlands) Maarten Lafeber (1)	24		
19 Oct	Turespaña Mallorca Classic	Spain	€400,000	(Spain) Miguel Ángel Jiménez (7)	16	CHA	New tournament
26 Oct	Telefónica Open de Madrid	Spain	€1,400,000	(Argentina) Ricardo González (2)	30		
2 Nov	Volvo Masters Andalucía	Spain	US$4,000,000	(Sweden) Freddie Jacobson (3)	46		Tour Championship

=== Unofficial events ===
The following events were sanctioned by the European Tour, but did not carry official money, nor were wins official.

Date	Tournament	Host country	Purse	Winner(s)	OWGR points	Notes
19 Oct	HSBC World Match Play Championship	England	£2,300,000	(South Africa) Ernie Els	n/a	Limited-field event
9 Nov	Seve Trophy	Spain	n/a	(Republic of Ireland) Team GB&I	n/a	Team event
18 Nov	WGC-World Cup	United States	US$4,000,000	(South Africa) Trevor Immelman and (South Africa) Rory Sabbatini	n/a	World Golf Championship; Team event

== Order of Merit ==
The Order of Merit was titled as the Volvo Order of Merit and was based on prize money won during the season, calculated in Euros.

Position	Player	Prize money (€)
1	(South Africa) Ernie Els	2,975,374
2	(Northern Ireland) Darren Clarke	2,210,051
3	(Republic of Ireland) Pádraig Harrington	1,555,623
4	(Sweden) Freddie Jacobson	1,521,303
5	(England) Ian Poulter	1,500,855
6	(England) Paul Casey	1,360,456
7	(England) Lee Westwood	1,330,713
8	(Denmark) Thomas Bjørn	1,327,148
9	(England) Brian Davis	1,245,513
10	(Wales) Phillip Price	1,234,018

== Awards ==
Award	Winner	Ref.
Golfer of the Year	(South Africa) Ernie Els	
Sir Henry Cotton Rookie of the Year	(Republic of Ireland) Peter Lawrie	

== See also ==
- 2003 European Seniors Tour
