= 2003 Open Championship =

Coordinates: 51.274°N 1.367°E

Tournament information
- Dates: 17–20 July 2003
- Location: Sandwich, England
- Course: Royal St George's Golf Club
- Organized by: The R&A
- Tour(s): European Tour; PGA Tour; Japan Golf Tour

Statistics
- Par: 71
- Length: 7,106 yards (6,498 m)
- Field: 156 players, 75 after cut
- Cut: 150 (+8)
- Prize fund: £3,900,000 €5,631,600 $6,240,000
- Winner's share: £700,000 €1,010,800 $1,112,720

Champion
- (United States) Ben Curtis
- 283 (−1)

Location in England

The 2003 Open Championship was a men's major golf championship and the 132nd Open Championship, held from 17 to 20 July at Royal St George's Golf Club in Sandwich, England. Ben Curtis won his only major title, one stroke ahead of runners-up Thomas Bjørn and Vijay Singh. Bjørn had led in the final round by two shots with three holes to play, but needed three attempts to play out of a greenside bunker on the 16th hole. Playing in his first major championship and number 396 in the world rankings, Curtis became the first debut winner at The Open since Tom Watson in 1975.

== Course layout ==
Hole	1	2	3	4	5	6	7	8	9	Out	10	11	12	13	14	15	16	17	18	In	Total
Yards	442	418	210	497	420	172	532	455	388	3,534	414	242	381	459	550	475	163	428	460	3,572	7,106
Par	4	4	3	5	4	3	5	4	4	36	4	3	4	4	5	4	3	4	4	35	71

- The 4th hole was a par 4 in previous Opens

Lengths of the course for previous Opens (since 1950):

- 1993: 6,860 yards (6,273 m), par 70
- 1985: 6,857 yards (6,270 m), par 70
- 1981: 6,827 yards (6,243 m), par 70

== Field ==
1. Top 15 and ties from the 2002 Open Championship

Stuart Appleby (4), Thomas Bjørn (4,5,18), Steve Elkington, Ernie Els (2,3,4,5,10,14), Gary Evans, Sergio García (4,5,14,18), Retief Goosen (4,5,10,14), Søren Hansen (5), Pádraig Harrington (4,5,18), Justin Leonard (2,3,4,14), Thomas Levet, Peter Lonard (4,22), Davis Love III (4,13,18), Shigeki Maruyama (4,14), Peter O'Malley (22), Nick Price (2,3,4,14)

- Scott Hoch (4,18) did not play.

2. Open Champions, 1993–2002

John Daly (3), David Duval (3,18), Paul Lawrie (3,4,5), Tom Lehman (3), Greg Norman (3), Mark O'Meara (3), Tiger Woods (3,4,10,11,12,13,14,18)

3. Past Open Champions aged 65 or under on 20 July 2003

Mark Calcavecchia (18), Nick Faldo, Sandy Lyle, Tom Watson

- Seve Ballesteros withdrew.
- Ian Baker-Finch, Tony Jacklin, Johnny Miller, Jack Nicklaus, Bill Rogers, Lee Trevino, and Tom Weiskopf did not enter.

4. The first 50 players on the OWGR on 29 May 2003

Robert Allenby (14), Rich Beem (12,14), Ángel Cabrera (5), Michael Campbell (5), Paul Casey, K. J. Choi (14), Darren Clarke (18), Fred Couples, Chris DiMarco (14), Bob Estes, Niclas Fasth (5,18), Brad Faxon, Steve Flesch, Fred Funk (14), Jim Furyk (10,14,18), Jay Haas, Charles Howell III (14), Trevor Immelman (5,24), Jerry Kelly (14), Bernhard Langer (5,18), Len Mattiace (14), Phil Mickelson (14,18), Colin Montgomerie (5,6,18), Craig Parry (22), Kenny Perry, Chris Riley, Eduardo Romero (5), Justin Rose (5), Adam Scott (5), Vijay Singh (11,12,14), Jeff Sluman (14), David Toms (12,14,18), Scott Verplank (18), Mike Weir (11)

- Rocco Mediate and Kirk Triplett did not play.

5. Top 20 in the final 2002 European Tour Order of Merit

Bradley Dredge, Anders Hansen (6), Stephen Leaney, José María Olazábal (11)

6. The Volvo PGA Championship winners for 2000–03

Ignacio Garrido, Andrew Oldcorn

7. First 5 players, not exempt, in the top 20 of the 2003 European Tour Order of Merit as of 29 May

Brian Davis, Robert-Jan Derksen, Kenneth Ferrie, Mathias Grönberg, Freddie Jacobson

8. First 7 European Tour members, not exempt, in the top 25 of a cumulative money list taken from all official European Tour events from the 2003 Volvo PGA Championship up to and including the 2003 Scottish Open

Alastair Forsyth, Philip Golding, David Howell, Søren Kjeldsen, Mark McNulty, Greg Owen, Ian Poulter

9. The leading 8 players, not exempt having applied (8) above, in the 2003 Scottish Open

Raphaël Jacquelin, David Lynn, Rolf Muntz, Gary Murphy, Nick O'Hern, Iain Pyman, Mark Roe, Charl Schwartzel

10. The U.S. Open Champions for 1994–2003

Lee Janzen, Corey Pavin

- Steve Jones did not play.

11. The Masters Champions for 1999–2003

12. The PGA Champions for 1998–2002

13. The Players Champions for 2000–03

Craig Perks, Hal Sutton (18)

14. Top 20 in the final 2002 PGA Tour Official Money List

15. First 5 players, not exempt, in the top 20 of the 2003 PGA Tour Official Money List as of 29 May

Chad Campbell

16. First 7 PGA Tour members, not exempt, in the top 25 of a cumulative money list taken from the 2003 Players Championship and the five PGA Tour events leading up to and including the 2003 Western Open

Joe Durant, Jonathan Kaye, Cliff Kresge, J. L. Lewis, Rory Sabbatini, Duffy Waldorf

- Joey Sindelar did not play.

17. The leading 8 players, not exempt having applied (16) above, in the 2003 Western Open

Tom Byrum, José Cóceres, Ben Curtis, Luke Donald, Dudley Hart, Skip Kendall, Scott McCarron, Chris Smith

18. Playing members of the 2002 Ryder Cup teams

Paul Azinger, Stewart Cink, Pierre Fulke, Paul McGinley, Jesper Parnevik, Phillip Price, Lee Westwood

19. The 2002 Canadian Open Champion

John Rollins

20. The 2002 Japan Open Champion

David Smail

21. Winner of the 2002 Asian PGA Tour Order of Merit

Jyoti Randhawa

22. Top 3 from the 2002–03 PGA Tour of Australasia Order of Merit

23. Top 3 from the 2002 Japan Golf Tour Order of Merit

Shingo Katayama, Nobuhito Sato, Toru Taniguchi

24. Top 2 from the 2002–03 Sunshine Tour Order of Merit

Mark Foster

25. The leading player, not exempt, in the 2003 Mizuno Open

Todd Hamilton

26. First 4, not exempt having applied (25) above, in the top 20 of a cumulative money list taken from all official Japan Golf Tour events from the 2003 Japan PGA Championship up to and including the 2003 Mizuno Open

Hur Suk-ho, Hirofumi Miyase, Hideto Tanihara, Katsuyoshi Tomori

27. The 2002 Senior British Open Champion

Noboru Sugai

28. The 2003 Amateur Champion

Gary Wolstenholme (a)

29. The 2002 U.S. Amateur Champion

Ricky Barnes (a)

30. The 2002 European Amateur Champion

- Raphaël Pellicioli forfeited his exemption by turning pro.

Final Qualifying (Sunday 13 July and Monday 14 July)
Littlestone – Steven Bowditch, Robert Coles, Scott Godfrey (a), Adam Le Vesconte, Christopher Smith, Anthony Wall, Paul Wesselingh
North Foreland – Gary Emerson, Andrew George, Adam Mednick, Mårten Olander, Hennie Otto, Anthony Sproston, Simon Wakefield
Prince's – Mathew Goggin, Jarrod Moseley, Cameron Percy, Andrew Raitt, Marco Ruiz, Steen Tinning, Ian Woosnam
Royal Cinque Ports – Markus Brier, Charles Challen, Ben Crane, Peter Fowler, Euan Little, Malcolm MacKenzie, Mark Smith

== Round summaries ==
=== First round ===
Thursday, 17 July 2003

Place	Player	Score	To par
1	(South Africa) Hennie Otto	68	−3
T2	(United States) Davis Love III	69	−2
T2	(Australia) Greg Norman	69	−2
T4	(South Korea) S.K. Ho	70	−1
T4	(Sweden) Freddie Jacobson	70	−1
T6	(United States) Fred Couples	71	E
T6	(England) Gary Evans	71	E
T6	(Sweden) Mathias Grönberg	71	E
T6	(United States) Charles Howell III	71	E
T6	(France) Thomas Levet	71	E
T6	(United States) Scott McCarron	71	E
T6	(United States) Tom Watson	71	E

=== Second round ===
Friday, 18 July 2003

Place	Player	Score	To par
1	(United States) Davis Love III	69-72=141	−1
T2	(Denmark) Thomas Bjørn	73-70=143	+1
T2	(South Korea) S.K. Ho	70-73=143	+1
T4	(United States) Ben Curtis	72-72=144	+2
T4	(Scotland) Alastair Forsyth	74-70=144	+2
T4	(Spain) Sergio García	73-71=144	+2
T4	(France) Thomas Levet	71-73=144	+2
T4	(South Africa) Hennie Otto	68-76=144	+2
T4	(United States) Kenny Perry	74-70=144	+2
T4	(Paraguay) Marco Ruiz	73-71=144	+2

Amateurs: Barnes (+11), Wolstenholme (+14), Godfrey (+18).

=== Third round ===
Saturday, 19 July 2003

Mark Roe shot a 67 to finish at one over par, but he and playing partner Jesper Parnevik were disqualified, having failed to exchange scorecards and therefore having signed incorrect scorecards. The rule that resulted in the disqualifications was changed two years later; Roe never played in another major.

Place	Player	Score	To par
1	(Denmark) Thomas Bjørn	73-70-69=212	−1
2	(United States) Davis Love III	69-72-72=213	E
T3	(United States) Ben Curtis	72-72-70=214	+1
T3	(Spain) Sergio García	73-71-70=214	+1
T3	(United States) Kenny Perry	74-70-70=214	+1
T3	(Fiji) Vijay Singh	75-70-69=214	+1
T3	(United States) Tiger Woods	73-72-69=214	+1
T8	(South Korea) Hur Suk-ho	70-73-72=215	+2
T8	(Wales) Phillip Price	74-72-69=215	+2
T10	(England) Gary Evans	71-75-70=216	+3
T10	(Sweden) Pierre Fulke	77-72-67=216	+3
T10	(Sweden) Freddie Jacobson	70-76-70=216	+3
T10	(Australia) Peter Lonard	73-73-70=216	+3

=== Final round ===
Sunday, 20 July 2003

Ben Curtis shot six-under in the first 11 holes to grab a 2 stroke lead, but dropped four strokes in the next six holes to fall behind, and sank a 10-foot (3 m) par putt on the final hole to post the clubhouse lead. Vijay Singh and Tiger Woods also moved into early contention, but fell behind Curtis with late bogeys, leaving Thomas Bjørn with a three stroke lead with four holes to play. He finished bogey-double bogey-bogey-par and tied for second, one stroke back.

It was not only Curtis' first win, but his first top-10 finish in a PGA Tour event.

Place	Player	Score	To par	Money (£)
1	(United States) Ben Curtis	72-72-70-69=283	−1	700,000
T2	(Denmark) Thomas Bjørn	73-70-69-72=284	E	345,000
T2	(Fiji) Vijay Singh	75-70-69-70=284	E	345,000
T4	(United States) Davis Love III	69-72-72-72=285	+1	185,000
T4	(United States) Tiger Woods	73-72-69-71=285	+1	185,000
T6	(England) Brian Davis	77-73-68-68=286	+2	134,500
T6	(Sweden) Freddie Jacobson	70-76-70-70=286	+2	134,500
T8	(England) Nick Faldo	76-74-67-70=287	+3	155,383
T8	(United States) Kenny Perry	74-70-70-73=287	+3	155,383
T10	(England) Gary Evans	71-75-70-72=288	+4	97,750
T10	(Spain) Sergio García	73-71-70-74=288	+4	97,750
T10	(South Africa) Retief Goosen	73-75-71-69=288	+4	97,750
T10	(South Africa) Hennie Otto	68-76-75-69=288	+4	97,750
T10	(Wales) Phillip Price	74-72-69-73=288	+4	97,750

==== Scorecard ====
Final round

Hole	1	2	3	4	5	6	7	8	9	10	11	12	13	14	15	16	17	18
Par	4	4	3	5	4	3	5	4	4	4	3	4	4	5	4	3	4	4
(United States) Curtis	E	E	E	−1	−1	−1	−2	−2	−3	−4	−5	−4	−4	−3	−2	−2	−1	−1
(Denmark) Bjørn	E	E	−1	−2	−2	−2	−3	−3	−3	−3	−3	−3	−3	−4	−3	−1	E	E
(Fiji) Singh	+1	E	E	E	−1	−2	−3	−2	−2	−1	−1	−1	E	−1	−1	E	E	E
(United States) Love	+1	+2	+2	+3	+3	+2	+2	+2	+3	+2	+2	+1	E	E	E	E	+1	+1
(United States) Woods	+1	+1	+1	E	−1	−1	−2	−1	−1	E	E	E	E	−1	E	E	+1	+1

Cumulative tournament scores, relative to par
