= Freddie Jacobson =

Swedish professional golfer (born 1974)

Personal information
- Full name: Fredrik Ulf Yngve Jacobson
- Nicknames: Freddie, Fidde
- Nationality: Sweden
- Born: 26 September 1974 (age 52) Kungsbacka, Sweden
- Height: 1.85 m (6 ft 1 in)
- Weight: 178 lb (81 kg; 12.7 st)
- Spouse: Erika Juthage Jacobson (m. 2003)
- Children: 3

Career
- Sport: Golf
- Current tour: PGA Tour Champions
- Former tours: PGA Tour; European Tour
- Professional wins: 4
- Highest ranking: 16 (23 November 2003)

Number of wins by tour
- PGA Tour: 1
- European Tour: 3

Best results in major championships
- Masters Tournament: T17: 2004
- PGA Championship: T17: 2004
- U.S. Open: T5: 2003
- The Open Championship: T6: 2003

Fredrik Ulf Yngve Jacobson (born 26 September 1974) is a Swedish professional golfer who formerly played on the PGA Tour and the European Tour, and now plays on the PGA Tour Champions.

== Early life ==
Jacobson was born in Kungsbacka, 30 kilometers south of Gothenburg, on the west coast of Sweden. At young age, he was a promising ice hockey player. When Jacobson was 10 years old, he started playing golf. The club pro, Per Nellbeck, at the local golf club, Kungsbacka Golf Club, also played ice hockey and taught the entire Jacobson family to play, his parents Ulf and Monica and his sister Therese, who also came to be a golf professional.

Jacobson also showed early talent in table tennis and ranked top 30 in his country at age 14–15.

== Amateur career ==
At age 18, Jacobson won both the European and the World final of the 1992 Doug Sanders International Junior Championship at Hazlehead Golf Club, Aberdeen, Scotland.

In 1994, Jacobson won the last edition of the British Youths Open Championship, scoring 277 over 72 holes at Royal St David's Golf Club, Wales.

Jacobson represented Sweden at the 1994 Eisenhower Trophy at Le Golf National outside Paris, France. He finished 3rd with his team and best Swedish player, tied 4th individually, one stroke ahead of Tiger Woods.

== Professional career ==
=== European Tour ===
Jacobson turned professional in late in 1994 and qualified for the 1995 European Tour through qualifying school, He was a member of the European Tour in 1995 and from 1997 to 2004. In December 2002 he won his first European Tour title, belonging to the 2002–2003 season, and went on to claim two more victories that season. His fourth-place finish on the Order of Merit that year equalled Anders Forsbrand's Swedish record set in 1992, and was the first Swede to win three official money events in one season on the European Tour. Jacobson's victory at the 2003 Algarve Open de Portugal was the 50th win by a Swedish player on the European Tour.

At the 2003 German Masters, Jacobson tied the European Tour 18-hole scoring record for one round, by shooting 12 under par 60 in the first round. The record was beaten in 2018, when Oliver Fisher scored a round of 59 at the Portugal Masters, but it is still, as of November 2020, a tied European Tour record in relation to par. It was also the lowest 18 hole score ever by a Swedish male player.

Jacobson was the top scorer in the 2003 Seve Trophy, representing the Continent of Europe against Great Britain and Ireland. He collected four and a half points out of five.

In 2004 he just missed out on a Ryder Cup place, finishing one place short in both the European Tour rankings and the world ranking points rankings, and not being selected as a captain's pick.

=== PGA Tour ===
In 2004, he joined the PGA Tour. Jacobson won his first PGA Tour title in 2011 at the Travelers Championship. He beat Ryan Moore, who missed a short four footer at the 72nd hole which would have gotten him into a playoff with Jacobson, but instead settled for a tie with John Rollins one shot behind. During the week, Jacobson went 63 holes bogey-free until the difficult par four 10th on Sunday where he made a bogey five. He hit 100% of the fairways during rounds three and four.

In November 2011, Jacobson had his best finish ever in a World Golf Championship event when he finished solo 2nd at the WGC-HSBC Champions in Shanghai, China. Jacobson had led the tournament after rounds two and three and entered the final round with a two stroke advantage over Louis Oosthuizen. However it was a final round surge from Martin Kaymer that denied Jacobson, the German firing nine birdies on the day to post a 63. Jacobson could only record a 71 to fall short by three strokes.

At the 2013 Northern Trust Open, Jacobson had a chance to win his second PGA Tour title when he birdied the 15th and 16th holes in the final round to tie the lead. He then missed a short birdie putt at the 17th to take the outright lead. On the 72nd hole, Jacobson missed a five-foot par putt, which left him one shot outside of the playoff.

Jacobson has been featured in the top 20 of the Official World Golf Rankings, with 16th his highest position, received in November 2003.

Jacobson cut his 2014–15 season short after the Crowne Plaza Invitational to care for his son Max, who underwent open-heart surgery. The procedure was successful, and Max recovered well. The PGA Tour granted Jacobson a medical extension under the family crisis provision. Jacobson fulfilled his medical extension with a fifth-place finish at the 2016 RSM Classic.

=== PGA Tour Champions ===
Jacobson made his PGA Tour Champions debut the week after he turned 50 at the 2024 Constellation Furyk and Friends, where he was tied for the lead after the first round and ultimately finished tied 10th. He finished solo second behind Søren Kjeldsen at the Qualifying Tournament to secure one of five available cards for the 2025 season, where he was runner-up at the Hoag Classic, a stroke behind Miguel Ángel Jiménez. After six top-5 finishes, including a tie for 3rd at the season-ending Charles Schwab Cup Championship, he finished 12th in the rankings his rookie season.

== Awards and honors ==
- In 2000, Jacobson earned Elite Sign No. 120 by the Swedish Golf Federation, on the basis of national team appearances and national championship performances.
- In 2012, Jacobson was awarded honorary member of the PGA of Sweden.

== Amateur wins ==
- 1992 Doug Sanders International Junior Golf Championship, Euro Junior Masters, Swedish Junior under 18 Championship, Greek Junior Open Championship
- 1994 British Youths Open Amateur Championship

== Professional wins (4) ==
=== PGA Tour wins (1) ===
No.	Date	Tournament	Winning score	Margin of victory	Runners-up
1	26 Jun 2011	Travelers Championship	−20 (65-66-63-66=260)	1 stroke	(United States) Ryan Moore, (United States) John Rollins

=== European Tour wins (3) ===
Legend
Tour Championships (1)
Other European Tour (2)

No.	Date	Tournament	Winning score	Margin of victory	Runner(s)-up
1	1 Dec 2002 (2003 season)	Omega Hong Kong Open^{1}	−16 (68-65-63-64=260)	2 strokes	(Argentina) Jorge Berendt, (Sweden) Henrik Nyström
2	20 Apr 2003	Algarve Open de Portugal	−5 (64-76-71-72=283)	1 stroke	(England) Brian Davis, (Wales) Jamie Donaldson, (Wales) Bradley Dredge
3	2 Nov 2003	Volvo Masters Andalucía	−12 (64-71-71-70=276)	Playoff	(Spain) Carlos Rodiles

^{1}Co-sanctioned by the Asian PGA Tour

European Tour playoff record (1–2)

No.	Year	Tournament	Opponent	Result
1	1998	Belgacom Open	(England) Lee Westwood	Lost to birdie on first extra hole
2	2002	Barclays Scottish Open	(Argentina) Eduardo Romero	Lost to birdie on first extra hole
3	2003	Volvo Masters Andalucía	(Spain) Carlos Rodiles	Won with par on fourth extra hole

== Results in major championships ==
Tournament	1998	1999
Masters Tournament		
U.S. Open		
The Open Championship	76	
PGA Championship		

Tournament	2000	2001	2002	2003	2004	2005	2006	2007	2008	2009
Masters Tournament					T17	CUT				
U.S. Open				T5	CUT				CUT	
The Open Championship	CUT	CUT	CUT	T6	CUT	T52			T19	T70
PGA Championship				CUT	T17	T34			T24	

Tournament	2010	2011	2012	2013	2014	2015	2016
Masters Tournament			T19	T25			
U.S. Open		T14	T15	CUT			
The Open Championship		T16	T54	T44	CUT		
PGA Championship	CUT	CUT	T36	CUT	T69		T73

Top 10
Did not play

CUT = missed the half-way cut
"T" = tied

=== Summary ===
Tournament	Wins	2nd	3rd	Top-5	Top-10	Top-25	Events	Cuts made
Masters Tournament	0	0	0	0	0	3	4	3
U.S. Open	0	0	0	1	1	3	6	3
The Open Championship	0	0	0	0	1	3	13	8
PGA Championship	0	0	0	0	0	2	10	6
Totals	0	0	0	1	2	11	33	20

- Most consecutive cuts made – 5 (2012 Masters – 2013 Masters)
- Longest streak of top-10s – 2 (2003 U.S. Open – 2003 Open Championship)

== Results in The Players Championship ==
Tournament	2004	2005	2006	2007	2008	2009	2010	2011	2012	2013	2014	2015	2016	2017
The Players Championship	CUT	CUT	T22	CUT	T32	T49	T10	T64	CUT	T48	64	T42	T49	CUT

Top 10

CUT = missed the halfway cut
"T" indicates a tie for a place

== Results in World Golf Championships ==
Tournament	2003	2004	2005	2006	2007	2008	2009	2010	2011	2012	2013
Match Play		R16	R64							R64	R16
Championship	T28	T59								68	T16
Invitational	84	T32				T56			T11	T50	
Champions									2		

Top 10
Did not play

QF, R16, R32, R64 = Round in which player lost in match play
"T" = tied
Note that the HSBC Champions did not become a WGC event until 2009.

== Team appearances ==
Amateur

- Jacques Léglise Trophy (representing the Continent of Europe): 1992
- European Boys' Team Championship (representing Sweden): 1992
- European Amateur Team Championship (representing Sweden): 1993
- Eisenhower Trophy (representing Sweden): 1994

Professional

- WGC-World Cup (representing Sweden): 2003, 2004
- Seve Trophy (representing Continental Europe): 2003
