= 2003 Volvo PGA Championship =

Tournament information
- Dates: 22–25 May 2003
- Location: Virginia Water, Surrey, England; 51.40°N 0.59°W
- Courses: Wentworth Club; West Course
- Tour: European Tour

Statistics
- Par: 72
- Length: 7,073 yards (6,468 m)
- Field: 156 players, 75 after cut
- Cut: 143 (−1)
- Prize fund: €3,500,000
- Winner's share: €625,000

Champion
- (Spain) Ignacio Garrido
- 270 (−18)

Location map
- Location in England Location in Surrey

The 2003 Volvo PGA Championship was the 49th edition of the Volvo PGA Championship, an annual professional golf tournament on the European Tour. It was held 22–25 May at the West Course of Wentworth Club in Virginia Water, Surrey, England, a suburb southwest of London.

Ignacio Garrido beat Trevor Immelman in a playoff to claim his first Volvo PGA Championship.

== Course layout ==
Wentworth Club, West Course
| Tee | Rating/Slope | 1 | 2 | 3 | 4 | 5 | 6 | 7 | 8 | 9 | Out | 10 | 11 | 12 | 13 | 14 | 15 | 16 | 17 | 18 | In | Total |
| Yardage | n/a | 474 | 154 | 447 | 496 | 191 | 354 | 396 | 400 | 452 | 3,364 | 184 | 404 | 509 | 467 | 179 | 481 | 383 | 571 | 531 | 3,709 | 7,073 |
| Par | | 4 | 3 | 4 | 5 | 3 | 4 | 4 | 4 | 4 | 35 | 3 | 4 | 5 | 4 | 3 | 4 | 4 | 5 | 5 | 37 | 72 |

== Round summaries ==
=== First round ===
Thursday, 22 May 2003

| Place | Player | Score | To par |
|---|---|---|---|
| 1 | (Northern Ireland) Darren Clarke | 66 | −6 |
| T2 | (Scotland) Alastair Forsyth | 67 | −5 |
| T2 | (Thailand) Thongchai Jaidee | 67 | −5 |
| T2 | (South Africa) James Kingston | 67 | −5 |
| T5 | (India) Arjun Atwal | 68 | −4 |
| T5 | (England) Peter Baker | 68 | −4 |
| T5 | (Scotland) Gordon Brand Jnr | 68 | −4 |
| T5 | (Denmark) Søren Kjeldsen | 68 | −4 |
| T5 | (Northern Ireland) Graeme McDowell | 68 | −4 |
| T5 | (Spain) José María Olazábal | 68 | −4 |
| T5 | (England) Greg Owen | 68 | −4 |
| T5 | (England) Justin Rose | 68 | −4 |
| T5 | (Australia) Adam Scott | 68 | −4 |
| T5 | (Australia) Peter Senior | 68 | −4 |
| T5 | (Wales) Ian Woosnam | 68 | −4 |

=== Second round ===
Friday, 23 May 2003

| Place | Player | Score | To par |
|---|---|---|---|
| 1 | (Northern Ireland) Darren Clarke | 66-69=135 | −9 |
| 2 | (Sweden) Niclas Fasth | 69-67=136 | −8 |
| T3 | (England) Kenneth Ferrie | 70-67=137 | −7 |
| T3 | (Denmark) Søren Hansen | 69-68=137 | −7 |
| T3 | (England) Robert Rock | 69-68=137 | −7 |
| T3 | (Wales) Ian Woosnam | 68-69=137 | −7 |
| T7 | (Scotland) Gordon Brand Jnr | 68-70=138 | −6 |
| T7 | (South Africa) Ernie Els | 69-69=138 | −6 |
| T7 | (Scotland) Alastair Forsyth | 67-71=138 | −6 |
| T7 | (South Africa) Trevor Immelman | 69-69=138 | −6 |

=== Third round ===
Saturday, 24 May 2003

| Place | Player | Score | To par |
|---|---|---|---|
| 1 | (South Africa) Trevor Immelman | 69-69-64=202 | −14 |
| 2 | (Sweden) Niclas Fasth | 69-67-68=204 | −12 |
| T3 | (South Africa) Ernie Els | 69-69-67=205 | −11 |
| T3 | (Spain) Ignacio Garrido | 70-69-66=205 | −11 |
| T5 | (Scotland) Gordon Brand Jnr | 68-70-68=206 | −10 |
| T5 | (England) Paul Casey | 70-72-64=206 | −10 |
| T5 | (Sweden) Mathias Grönberg | 72-67-67=206 | −10 |
| T8 | (Northern Ireland) Darren Clarke | 66-69-72=207 | −9 |
| T8 | (England) Nick Faldo | 71-68-68=207 | −9 |
| T8 | (England) Kenneth Ferrie | 70-67-70=207 | −9 |
| T8 | (Australia) Stephen Leaney | 69-73-65=207 | −9 |
| T8 | (United States) Kevin Na | 69-70-68=207 | −9 |
| T8 | (Scotland) Gary Orr | 69-72-66=207 | −9 |
| T8 | (Wales) Phillip Price | 71-69-67=207 | −9 |
| T8 | (England) Robert Rock | 69-68-70=207 | −9 |

=== Final round ===
Sunday, 25 May 2003

| Place | Player | Score | To par | Money (€) |
|---|---|---|---|---|
| T1 | (Spain) Ignacio Garrido | 70-69-66-65=270 | −18 | Playoff |
| T1 | (South Africa) Trevor Immelman | 69-69-64-68=270 | −18 | Playoff |
| 3 | (Sweden) Mathias Grönberg | 72-67-67-67=273 | −15 | 219,100 |
| 4 | (South Africa) Ernie Els | 69-69-67-69=274 | −14 | 175,000 |
| T5 | (England) Kenneth Ferrie | 70-67-70-68=275 | −13 | 135,450 |
| T5 | (England) Barry Lane | 72-68-68-67=275 | −13 | 135,450 |
| T7 | (Denmark) Søren Kjeldsen | 68-72-69-67=276 | −12 | 96,250 |
| T7 | (France) Thomas Levet | 74-69-66-67=276 | −12 | 96,250 |
| T9 | (England) Paul Casey | 70-72-64-71=277 | −11 | 65,870 |
| T9 | (England) Nick Faldo | 71-68-68-70=277 | −11 | 65,870 |
| T9 | (Scotland) Colin Montgomerie | 69-70-69-69=277 | −11 | 65,870 |
| T9 | (Scotland) Gary Orr | 69-72-66-70=277 | −11 | 65,870 |
| T9 | (Wales) Phillip Price | 71-69-67-70=277 | −11 | 65,870 |

==== Scorecard ====
| Hole | 1 | 2 | 3 | 4 | 5 | 6 | 7 | 8 | 9 | 10 | 11 | 12 | 13 | 14 | 15 | 16 | 17 | 18 |
|---|---|---|---|---|---|---|---|---|---|---|---|---|---|---|---|---|---|---|
| Par | 4 | 3 | 4 | 5 | 3 | 4 | 4 | 4 | 4 | 3 | 4 | 5 | 4 | 3 | 4 | 4 | 5 | 5 |
| (Spain) Garrido | −11 | −12 | −12 | −13 | −13 | −13 | −13 | −14 | −14 | −15 | −16 | −17 | −17 | −17 | −17 | −18 | −18 | −18 |
| (South Africa) Immelman | −14 | −15 | −14 | −14 | −14 | −14 | −14 | −15 | −15 | −15 | −15 | −15 | −15 | −15 | −16 | −16 | −17 | −18 |
| (Sweden) Grönberg | −10 | −11 | −10 | −11 | −11 | −11 | −12 | −12 | −12 | −13 | −14 | −14 | −14 | −14 | −14 | −14 | −15 | −15 |
| (South Africa) Els | −11 | −11 | −11 | −12 | −12 | −12 | −12 | −12 | −12 | −12 | −12 | −13 | −13 | −13 | −13 | −13 | −13 | −14 |
| (England) Ferrie | −8 | −8 | −8 | −9 | −9 | −10 | −10 | −10 | −10 | −10 | −10 | −11 | −11 | −11 | −12 | −11 | −12 | −13 |
| (England) Lane | −8 | −8 | −8 | −8 | −8 | −9 | −10 | −10 | −10 | −10 | −11 | −12 | −12 | −13 | −13 | −13 | −13 | −13 |
| (Denmark) Kjeldsen | −6 | −6 | −6 | −7 | −7 | −7 | −7 | −7 | −7 | −8 | −9 | −9 | −9 | −10 | −10 | −11 | −12 | −12 |
| (France) Levet | −6 | −6 | −5 | −5 | −6 | −6 | −7 | −8 | −8 | −8 | −9 | −10 | −10 | −10 | −11 | −11 | −12 | −12 |
| (Sweden) Fasth | −12 | −12 | −11 | −11 | −10 | −10 | −9 | −9 | −10 | −11 | −10 | −11 | −11 | −10 | −9 | −9 | −10 | −10 |

Cumulative tournament scores, relative to par

| Birdie | Bogey |

=== Playoff ===
The playoff began on the par five 18th; Immelman reached the green in two; while Garrido's second shot clattered into the trees and came to rest just off the green. Garrido played a superb chip shot to 2-feet, leaving himself a tap-in birdie. Immelman three-putted to hand the Spaniard the title.

| Place | Player | Score | To par | Money (€) | |
|---|---|---|---|---|---|
| 1 | Ignacio Garrido | Spain | 4 | −1 | 583,330 |
| 2 | Trevor Immelman | South Africa | 5 | E | 388,880 |
