= 2004 WGC-World Cup =

2004 World Cup
Tournament information
- Dates: 18–21 November
- Location: Seville, Spain; 37°20′30″N 5°56′04″W
- Course: Real Club de Golf de Seville
- Format: 72 holes stroke play (best ball & alternate shot)

Statistics
- Par: 72
- Length: 7,134 yards (6,523 m)
- Field: 24 two-man teams
- Cut: None
- Prize fund: US$4.0 million
- Winner's share: US$1.4 million

Champion
- England; Paul Casey & Luke Donald
- 257 (−31)
- Location in Spain Location in Andalusia

The 2004 WGC-World Cup took place 18–21 November at the Real Club de Golf de Seville in Seville, Spain. It was the 50th World Cup and the fifth as a World Golf Championship event. 24 countries competed and each country sent two players. The prize money totaled $4,000,000 with $1,400,000 going to the winning pair. The English team of Paul Casey and Luke Donald won. They won by one stroke over the home Spanish team of Sergio García and Miguel Ángel Jiménez.

== Qualification and format ==
18 teams qualified based on the Official World Golf Ranking and were joined by six teams via qualifiers in South America and Asia.

The tournament was a 72-hole stroke play team event with each team consisting of two players. The first and third days were fourball play and the second and final days were foursomes play.

== Teams ==
Country	Players
Argentina	Ángel Cabrera and Eduardo Romero
Australia	Stephen Leaney and Nick O'Hern
Austria	Markus Brier and Martin Wiegele
Canada	Stuart Anderson and Darren Griff
Colombia	José Manuel Garrido and Manuel Merizalde
Denmark	Anders Hansen and Søren Kjeldsen
England	Paul Casey and Luke Donald
France	Raphaël Jacquelin and Thomas Levet
Germany	Kariem Baraka and Marcel Siem
Ireland	Pádraig Harrington and Paul McGinley
Italy	Andrea Maestroni and Alessandro Tadini
Japan	Shigeki Maruyama and Hidemichi Tanaka
Mexico	Antonio Maldonado and Alex Quiroz
Myanmar	Kyi Hla Han and Soe Kyaw Naing
Netherlands	Robert-Jan Derksen and Maarten Lafeber
New Zealand	Craig Perks and David Smail
Scotland	Scott Drummond and Alastair Forsyth
South Africa	Trevor Immelman and Rory Sabbatini
South Korea	Kim Dae-sub and Shin Yong-jin
Spain	Sergio García and Miguel Ángel Jiménez
Sweden	Joakim Haeggman and Freddie Jacobson
Taiwan	Lu Wei-chih and Wang Ter-chang
United States	Bob Tway and Scott Verplank
Wales	Bradley Dredge and Phillip Price

== Scores ==
Place	Country	Score	To par	Money (US$)
1	England	61-64-68-64=257	−31	1,400,000
2	Spain	63-68-61-66=258	−30	700,000
3	Ireland	60-71-64-65=260	−28	400,000
4	South Africa	66-65-64-68=263	−25	200,000
T5	Austria	60-70-68-67=265	−23	135,000
T5	Netherlands	65-69-63-68=265	−23	135,000
T7	Germany	64-69-66-68=267	−21	95,000
T7	Sweden	64-67-64-72=267	−21	95,000
T7	United States	64-67-64-72=267	−21	95,000
T10	Australia	64-68-65-72=269	−19	62,500
T10	Japan	62-69-65-73=269	−19	62,500
T10	South Korea	65-70-64-70=269	−19	62,500
T10	Wales	65-69-64-71=269	−19	62,500
14	Denmark	64-73-67-66=270	−18	50,000
T15	France	68-68-66-70=272	−16	48,500
T15	New Zealand	69-73-62-68=272	−16	48,500
17	Italy	70-71-64-68=273	−15	47,000
18	Scotland	64-72-66-72=274	−14	46,000
19	Argentina	70-71-65-70=276	−12	45,000
20	Canada	68-71-64-73=277	−11	44,000
21	Colombia	67-73-65-75=280	−8	43,000
22	Myanmar	69-73-67-73=282	−6	42,000
23	Taiwan	70-70-68-75=283	−5	41,000
24	Mexico	74-72-68-74=288	E	40,000
