= Peter Lawrie =

Irish professional golfer

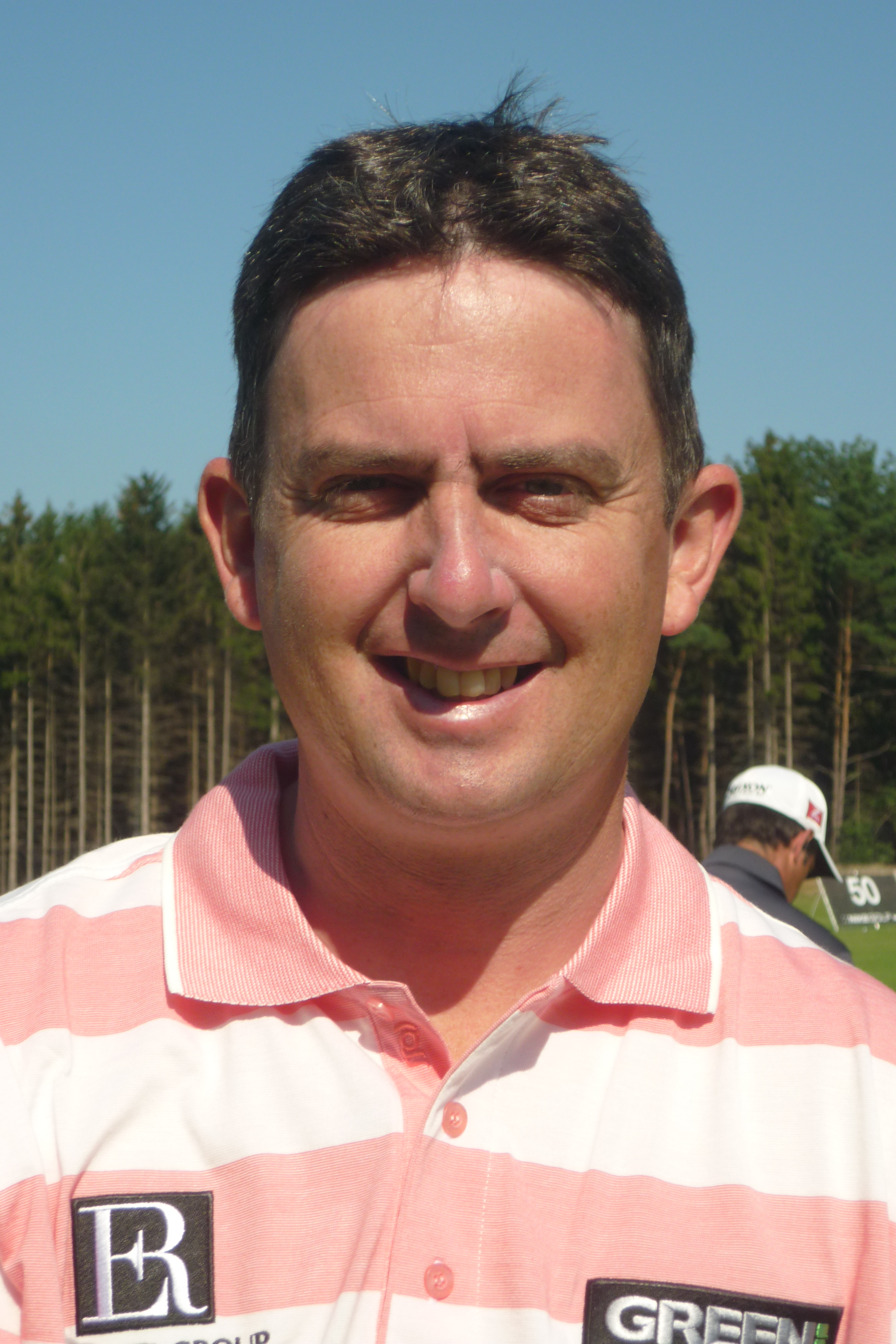

Personal information
- Nationality: Ireland
- Born: 22 March 1974 (age 52) Dublin, Ireland
- Height: 6 ft 0 in (1.83 m)
- Weight: 70 kg (154 lb; 11 st 0 lb)
- Spouse: Philippa (m. 2003)
- Children: 4

Career
- Sport: Golf
- College: University College Dublin
- Turned professional: 1997
- Former tours: European Tour; Challenge Tour
- Professional wins: 2

Number of wins by tour
- European Tour: 1
- Challenge Tour: 1

Best results in major championships
- Masters Tournament: DNP
- PGA Championship: DNP
- U.S. Open: CUT: 2012
- The Open Championship: CUT: 2005

Achievements and awards
- Sir Henry Cotton Rookie of the Year: 2003

Peter Lawrie (born 22 March 1974) is an Irish professional golfer.

== Early life and amateur career ==
In 1974, Lawrie was born in Dublin, Ireland. He was educated at Terenure College and University College Dublin where he took up a golf scholarship. He won the 1996 Irish Amateur Close Championship.

== Professional career ==
In 1997, Lawrie turned professional. It took him several years to get a card on the European Tour. He finished fourth on the Challenge Tour Rankings in 2002, including a victory in the Challenge Tour Grand Final. This earned him a European Tour card for the first time. Lawrie credited much of this success to the help of swing coach, Brendan McDaid.

Lawrie had a solid debut season on the European Tour 2003 season and also became the first Irishman to be named the Sir Henry Cotton Rookie of the Year. He also lost in a playoff at the 2003 Canarias Open de España, when Kenneth Ferrie birdied the second extra hole to defeat Lawrie and Peter Hedblom.

He had consistently finished in the top 100 of the Order of Merit since then, with a best position of 36th in 2010.

Lawrie achieved a breakthrough victory in 2008 when he won his first title on the European Tour at the Open de España, where he defeated Ignacio Garrido in a playoff.

In September 2016, he announced his retirement from the European Tour at the end of the season to take up a position as a golf professional in Luttrellstown Castle Golf Club.

== Professional wins (2) ==
=== European Tour wins (1) ===
No.	Date	Tournament	Winning score	Margin of victory	Runner-up
1	4 May 2008	Open de España	−15 (68-70-68-67=273)	Playoff	(Spain) Ignacio Garrido

European Tour playoff record (1–3)

No.	Year	Tournament	Opponent(s)	Result
1	2003	Canarias Open de España	(England) Kenneth Ferrie, (Sweden) Peter Hedblom	Ferrie won with birdie on second extra hole
2	2008	Open de España	(Spain) Ignacio Garrido	Won with par on second extra hole
3	2009	KLM Open	(England) Simon Dyson, (Sweden) Peter Hedblom	Dyson won with birdie on first extra hole
4	2010	Czech Open	(England) Gary Boyd, (Sweden) Peter Hanson	Hanson won with birdie on second extra hole

=== Challenge Tour wins (1) ===
Legend
Tour Championships (1)
Other Challenge Tour (0)

No.	Date	Tournament	Winning score	Margin of victory	Runner-up
1	27 Oct 2002	Challenge Tour Grand Final	−12 (71-67-69-65=272)	4 strokes	(France) Julien van Hauwe

== Results in major championships ==
Tournament	2005	2006	2007	2008	2009	2010	2011	2012
U.S. Open								CUT
The Open Championship	CUT							

Note: Lawrie never played in the Masters Tournament or the PGA Championship.

Did not play

CUT = missed the half-way cut

== Team appearances ==
Amateur

- European Youths' Team Championship (representing Ireland): 1994 (winners)
- European Amateur Team Championship (representing Ireland): 1997
- Palmer Cup (representing Great Britain & Ireland): 1997
