= Klassis Turkish Open =

Tournament information
- Location: Istanbul, Turkey
- Established: 1997
- Courses: Klassis Golf and Country Club
- Par: 71
- Tour: Challenge Tour
- Format: Stroke play
- Prize fund: £60,000
- Month played: June
- Final year: 1998

Tournament record score
- Aggregate: 272 Bradley Dredge (1997)
- To par: −16 as above

Final champion
- (Norway) Thomas Nielsen

Location map
- Location in Turkey

The Klassis Turkish Open was a golf tournament on the Challenge Tour, held in Turkey. First played in 1997 when Bradley Dredge triumphed over Magnus Persson Atlevi, it was discontinued after the 1998 edition. The Challenge Tour returned to Turkey in 2010 for the Turkish Challenge.

== Winners ==
Year	Winner	Score	To par	Margin of victory	Runner-up	Ref.
Osmanli Bankasi Klassis Turkish Open
1998	(Norway) Thomas Nielsen	273	−11	1 stroke	(Spain) Francisco Valera	
Klassis Turkish Open
1997	(Wales) Bradley Dredge	272	−16	1 stroke	(Sweden) Magnus Persson	

== See also ==
- Turkish Airlines Challenge
- Turkish Airlines Open
