= Bradley Dredge =

Welsh professional golfer (born 1973)

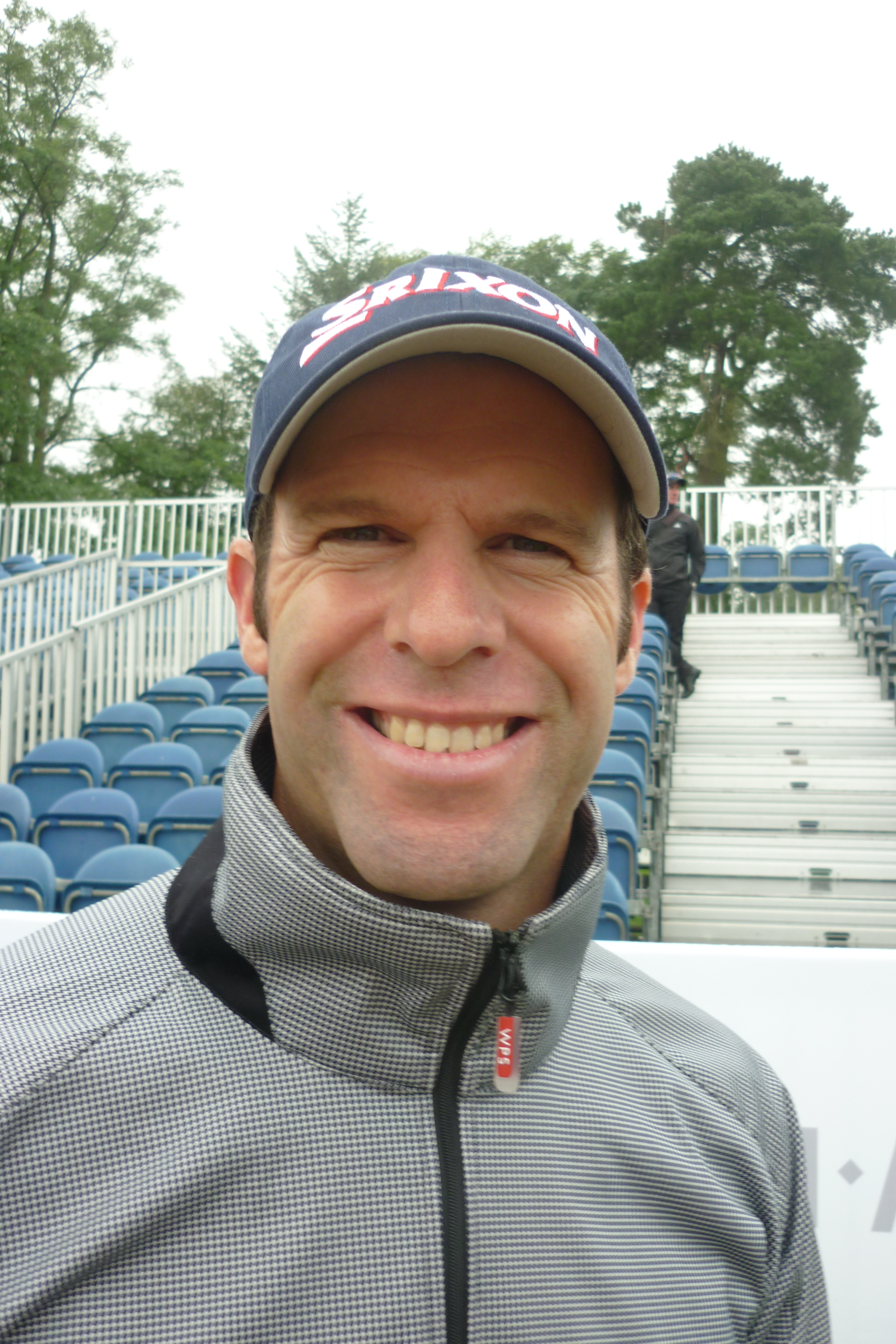

Personal information
- Nationality: Wales
- Born: 6 July 1973 (age 53) Tredegar, Wales
- Height: 1.83 m (6 ft 0 in)
- Weight: 76 kg (168 lb; 12.0 st)

Career
- Sport: Golf
- Turned professional: 1996
- Current tour: European Senior Tour
- Former tours: European Tour; Challenge Tour; PGA EuroPro Tour
- Professional wins: 11
- Highest ranking: 46 (16 September 2007)

Number of wins by tour
- European Tour: 2
- Challenge Tour: 3
- European Senior Tour: 1
- Other: 6

Best results in major championships
- Masters Tournament: T44: 2007
- PGA Championship: T79: 2016
- U.S. Open: CUT: 2017
- The Open Championship: T27: 2010

Bradley Dredge (born 6 July 1973) is a Welsh professional golfer who plays on the European Tour. He has won twice on the tour, the 2003 Madeira Island Open and the 2006 Omega European Masters, both by 8 strokes. He also won the 2005 WGC-World Cup in partnership with Stephen Dodd.

== Career ==
Dredge was born in Tredegar. In 1996, Dredge turned professional. He attempted to gain his card on the European Tour via the qualifying school in 1995 and 1996, the second time doing sufficiently well to gain a place on the Challenge Tour for 1997. He finished 15th in the rankings, having won the Klassis Turkish Open during the season, and graduated directly to the European Tour for 1998. He failed to win enough money during his rookie season to retain his status, and returned to the Challenge Tour the following season. He was again successful with a win at the Is Molas Challenge and a second-place finish at the Challenge Tour Championship helping him to 8th on the money list, and graduation back to the European Tour.

Dredge finished 105th in the 2000 European Tour Order of Merit, and then established himself on the tour, finishing inside the top 100 on the Order of Merit every season from 2001 to 2011. His first win on the European Tour came at the 2003 Madeira Island Open, and in 2006 he claimed his second title at the Omega European Masters. He achieved a career best Order of Merit position of 16th in 2005, and in the post-season he won the WGC-World Cup for Wales in partnership with Stephen Dodd. Dredge featured in the top 50 of the Official World Golf Rankings for short periods in 2006 and 2007. He was exactly 50th in the rankings at the end of 2006, giving him a place in the 2007 Masters Tournament.

After a poor 2012 Dredge lost his full European Tour playing rights and failed to regain his card at qualifying school. However, he retained conditional status for 2013. Illness and injury forced him to miss most of the 2013 season, but he was granted a medical extension for 2014, during which season he played in nine tournaments on the European Tour. He recorded back-to-back second-place finishes, and regained his card for 2015 by finishing 81st in the Race to Dubai.

2016 was his best season since 2007, finishing 31st in the Order of Merit. He was runner-up in the Dubai Duty Free Irish Open and the Made in Denmark tournament.

== Amateur wins ==
- 1991 Welsh Boys Championship
- 1993 Welsh Amateur Championship

== Professional wins (11) ==
=== European Tour wins (2) ===
No.	Date	Tournament	Winning score	Margin of victory	Runners-up
1	23 Mar 2003	Madeira Island Open^{1}	−16 (69-72-60-71=272)	8 strokes	(Sweden) Fredrik Andersson, (England) Brian Davis, (England) Andrew Marshall
2	10 Sep 2006	Omega European Masters	−17 (68-67-65-67=267)	8 strokes	(Italy) Francesco Molinari, (Germany) Marcel Siem

^{1}Dual-ranking event with the Challenge Tour

European Tour playoff record (0–1)

No.	Year	Tournament	Opponent	Result
1	2007	Irish Open	(Republic of Ireland) Pádraig Harrington	Lost to par on first extra hole

=== Challenge Tour wins (3) ===
No.	Date	Tournament	Winning score	Margin of victory	Runner(s)-up
1	3 Aug 1997	Klassis Turkish Open	−12 (65-72-65-70=272)	1 stroke	(Sweden) Magnus Persson
2	27 Jun 1999	Is Molas Challenge	−18 (69-68-68-65=270)	2 strokes	(Austria) Markus Brier
3	23 Mar 2003	Madeira Island Open^{1}	−16 (69-72-60-71=272)	8 strokes	(Sweden) Fredrik Andersson, (England) Brian Davis, (England) Andrew Marshall

^{1}Dual-ranking event with the European Tour

=== PGA EuroPro Tour wins (1) ===
No.	Date	Tournament	Winning score	Margin of victory	Runner-up
1	3 May 2003	Sky Sports Trophy	−4 (69-72-68=209)	3 strokes	(England) Nick Ludwell

=== Evolve Pro Tour wins (4) ===
No.	Date	Tournament	Winning score	Margin of victory	Runner(s)-up
1	20 Feb 2014	Hacienda Riquelme	−8 (70-66=136)	2 strokes	(England) Marcus Armitage
2	28 Feb 2014	El Valle 2	−2 (69-71=140)	5 strokes	(England) Alex Belt, (England) Marcus Armitage, (England) Matt Haines, (Republic of Ireland) Aaron Kearney
3	7 Feb 2020	Lo Romero Classic	−10 (68-70-68=206)	2 strokes	(South Korea) Ahn Jee-hyun, (Spain) José Buendía
4	3 Feb 2023	Roda Open	−17 (67-66-66=199)	2 strokes	(Wales) Jake Hapgood

=== Other wins (1) ===
Legend
World Golf Championships (1)
Other wins (0)

No.	Date	Tournament	Winning score	Margin of victory	Runners-up
1	20 Nov 2005	WGC-World Cup (with (Wales) Stephen Dodd)	−27 (61-67-61=189) (Note: Shortened to 54 holes due to weather.)	2 strokes	England − Luke Donald and David Howell, Sweden − Niclas Fasth and Henrik Stenson

=== European Senior Tour wins (1) ===
No.	Date	Tournament	Winning score	Margin of victory	Runners-up
1	14 Aug 2023	Legends Tour Trophy	−14 (67-69-66=202)	2 strokes	(Sweden) Joakim Haeggman, (Scotland) Greig Hutcheon

== Results in major championships ==
Tournament	1998	1999
Masters Tournament		
U.S. Open		
The Open Championship	CUT	
PGA Championship		

Tournament	2000	2001	2002	2003	2004	2005	2006	2007	2008	2009
Masters Tournament								T44		
U.S. Open										
The Open Championship			T28	CUT			CUT	CUT		
PGA Championship				CUT			CUT	CUT		

Tournament	2010	2011	2012	2013	2014	2015	2016	2017
Masters Tournament								
U.S. Open								CUT
The Open Championship	T27							
PGA Championship							T79	

Did not play

CUT = missed the half-way cut
"T" = tied

== Results in World Golf Championships ==
Results not in chronological order before 2015.

Tournament	2005	2006	2007	2008	2009	2010	2011	2012	2013	2014	2015	2016
Championship	T18											
Match Play			R32	R32								
Invitational												
Champions												T47

Did not play

QF, R16, R32, R64 = Round in which player lost in match play
"T" = Tied
Note that the HSBC Champions did not become a WGC event until 2009.

== Team appearances ==
Amateur

- European Boys' Team Championship (representing Wales): 1991
- Jacques Léglise Trophy (representing Great Britain & Ireland): 1991 (winners)
- Eisenhower Trophy (representing Great Britain & Ireland): 1992
- European Amateur Team Championship (representing Wales): 1993 (winners), 1995
- Walker Cup (representing Great Britain & Ireland): 1993
- St Andrews Trophy (representing Great Britain & Ireland): 1994 (winners)

Professional

- World Cup (representing Wales): 2002, 2003, 2004, 2005 (winners), 2006, 2007, 2008, 2016, 2018
- Seve Trophy (representing Great Britain & Ireland): 2005 (winners), 2007 (winners)

== See also ==
- 2019 European Tour Qualifying School graduates
