= Ben Curtis (golfer) =

American professional golfer (born 1977)

Personal information
- Full name: Ben Clifford Curtis
- Nationality: United States
- Born: May 26, 1977 (age 49) Columbus, Ohio, U.S.
- Height: 5 ft 11 in (180 cm)
- Weight: 175 lb (79 kg; 12.5 st)
- Spouse: Candace Curtis
- Children: 2

Career
- Sport: Golf
- College: Kent State University
- Turned professional: 2000
- Former tours: PGA Tour; European Tour; Web.com Tour; NGA Hooters Tour
- Professional wins: 5
- Highest ranking: 24 (November 2, 2008)

Number of wins by tour
- PGA Tour: 4
- European Tour: 1
- Other: 1

Best results in major championships (wins: 1)
- Masters Tournament: T35: 2009
- PGA Championship: T2: 2008
- U.S. Open: T14: 2010
- The Open Championship: Won: 2003

Achievements and awards
- PGA Tour Rookie of the Year: 2003

Ben Clifford Curtis (born May 26, 1977) is an American professional golfer and four-time winner on the PGA Tour, best known for winning the 2003 Open Championship.

In January 2018, Curtis told Golf Digest that he has stopped playing golf competitively, opting to teach instead.

== Early life ==
Curtis was born in Columbus, Ohio and grew up in Ostrander. His family runs the Mill Creek Golf Club, also in Ostrander. Curtis is a graduate of Buckeye Valley High School.

== Amateur career ==
Curtis attended Kent State University where he was a star on the golf team. He earned a bachelor's degree in recreation management in 2000.

As an amateur, Curtis found much success, winning the Ohio Amateur in 1999 and 2000 (joining professional golfers John Cook, Arnold Palmer and Frank Stranahan as the only men to win the Ohio Amateur in consecutive years), and also the Players Amateur in 2000.

== Professional career ==
Curtis turned professional in 2000, originally playing on the Hooters Tour without much success. At the end of 2002, he finished in a tie for 26th at that year's Q-School, earning his PGA Tour card for the following year, becoming one of the few players to completely skip the Nationwide Tour. His first year on tour began unspectacularly as he made a fair amount of cuts, but had no finishes in the top 25, until a tie for 13th at the Western Open on July 6, which qualified him for The Open Championship in England less than two weeks later.

=== 2003 Open Championship win ===
Curtis entered the 2003 Open Championship at Royal St George's as a 300–1 outsider, defying the odds to win the tournament.

After an opening round 72 (+1), he shot a second round 72 to pull into a seven-way tie for fourth. A third round 70 put Curtis in a five-way tie for third, two strokes behind leader Thomas Bjørn and one stroke behind second-place Davis Love III. While Bjørn shot a final round 72, Curtis fired a 69 to finish at −1, one stroke ahead of Bjørn and Vijay Singh.

The 2003 Open Championship was Curtis' first appearance in a major. He became the first golfer since Francis Ouimet in the 1913 U.S. Open to win his major championship debut, later accomplished by Keegan Bradley in the 2011 PGA Championship. After his victory, Curtis jumped from 396th in the world rankings to 35th. This victory and a solid first season on the PGA Tour led to Curtis being named the 2003 PGA Tour Rookie of the Year. Curtis was the lowest-ranked player to win a major since official world rankings were first calculated.

=== Further success ===
2004–07

Curtis' Open Championship victory gave him a five-year exemption on the PGA Tour and a 10-year exemption on the European Tour, and he played events on both tours in 2004. However, he did not experience immediate success, missing many cuts and only recording one top-10 finish on the PGA Tour. He missed even more cuts in 2005 and only had two top-10 finishes.

In 2006, his results improved as he made the cut much more consistently and recorded two wins, the Booz Allen Classic and the 84 Lumber Classic. His consistent form continued into 2007 and he tied for 8th place at that year's Open Championship in Carnoustie, his best result in a major since winning the tournament.

2008–09

Curtis recorded five top-10 finishes and missed only four cuts. He bettered his Open Championship result from the previous year by finishing in a tie for 7th at Royal Birkdale and followed it up a month later by finishing tied for 2nd place in the PGA Championship at Oakland Hills. This second-place finish qualified him for the 2008 Ryder Cup, his first appearance in the event.

For 2009, Curtis missed only three cuts in 18 PGA Tour events. However, Curtis managed only one top-20 finish and ended the year outside the top 100 in the money list. He did achieve two top-10 finishes on the European Tour. At the 2009 Open Championship at Turnberry, Curtis shot a 65 to tie for second after the first round, but a second round 80 meant that he missed the cut by one shot.

2010–12

In 2010, Curtis missed only eight cuts in 24 events, but achieved only one top-10 finish and he ended outside the top 100 on the money list for a second consecutive year. A rough 2011 season saw Curtis finish 149th on the PGA Tour money list after making 10 cuts in 23 events, leaving him partially exempt for the 2012 PGA Tour season. For the start of the 2012 season, he split his time between the European Tour and PGA Tour, taking advantage of his European Tour exemption and attempting to qualify for the Race to Dubai.

In April 2012, Curtis won the Valero Texas Open for his fourth PGA Tour victory, ending a six-year winless drought. Curtis held a one-shot lead entering the 71st hole and made a 22-foot putt for par to maintain his lead. He went on to birdie the last hole, sinking a 12-foot birdie putt for a two-stroke victory over Matt Every and John Huh. With the win, Curtis regained full exemption status on the PGA Tour through 2014. Curtis jumped from 200th to 28th in the FedEx Cup standings and moved up over 100 places in the world rankings to 156th.

Curtis followed up his win at the Valero Texas Open with three straight top-15 finishes (tied for 13th at the Zurich Classic, tied for 5th at the Wells Fargo Classic, and tied for 2nd at The Players Championship). This moved him into the top 75 of the Official World Golf Ranking. His career high ranking is 24th. He also finished tied for 11th in the PGA Championship, his best finish in a major championship in four years.

2013–16

In 2013 Curtis played in 20 PGA Tour events, making the cut in 10 with three top-25 finishes. His 2014 season netted him one top 10 and ten missed cuts in 24 starts to finish 131st in the FedEx Cup, leaving him partially exempt for the 2015 season. In 2015 Curtis played a partial schedule on the PGA Tour with little success. He played 14 events and only made the cut three times, with his best finish a tie for 29th at the Sanderson Farms Championship. With a finish well outside 150th, Curtis played the 2015–16 season with only past champion status. He only played five events during the 2016 season, missing the cut in all but one tournament.

== Personal life ==
Curtis, his wife Candace, and their two children reside in Franklin Township, just north of Kent, Ohio after previously living in neighboring Stow. In 2013, Ben and Candace started the Ben Curtis Family Foundation to benefit needy children in the Kent area. He is currently coaching his son as the Head Golf Coach at Kent Roosevelt High School.

== Amateur wins ==
- 1999 Ohio Amateur
- 2000 Ohio Amateur, Players Amateur

== Professional wins (5) ==
=== PGA Tour wins (4) ===
Legend
Major championships (1)
Other PGA Tour (3)

No.	Date	Tournament	Winning score	To par	Margin of victory	Runner(s)-up
1	Jul 20, 2003	The Open Championship	72-72-70-69=283	−1	1 stroke	(Denmark) Thomas Bjørn, (Fiji) Vijay Singh
2	Jun 27, 2006	Booz Allen Classic	62-65-67-70=264	−20	5 strokes	(United States) Billy Andrade, (Republic of Ireland) Pádraig Harrington, (Australia) Nick O'Hern, (United States) Steve Stricker
3	Sep 17, 2006	84 Lumber Classic	66-69-69-70=274	−14	2 strokes	(United States) Charles Howell III
4	Apr 22, 2012	Valero Texas Open	67-67-73-72=279	−9	2 strokes	(United States) Matt Every, (United States) John Huh

=== European Tour wins (1) ===
Legend
Major championships (1)
Other European Tour (0)

No.	Date	Tournament	Winning score	To par	Margin of victory	Runners-up
1	Jul 20, 2003	The Open Championship	72-72-70-69=283	−1	1 stroke	(Denmark) Thomas Bjørn, (Fiji) Vijay Singh

=== NGA Hooters Tour wins (1) ===
No.	Date	Tournament	Winning score	To par	Margin of victory	Runner-up
1	Jun 30, 2002	Grand Strand Classic	67-69-69-67=272	−16	2 strokes	(United States) Nick Jones

== Major championships ==
=== Wins (1) ===
Year	Championship	54 holes	Winning score	Margin	Runners-up
2003	The Open Championship	2 shot deficit	−1 (72-72-70-69=283)	1 stroke	(Denmark) Thomas Bjørn, (Fiji) Vijay Singh

=== Results timeline ===
Tournament	2003	2004	2005	2006	2007	2008	2009
Masters Tournament		CUT	CUT	T39	CUT	CUT	T35
U.S. Open		30	CUT	57	T45	CUT	57
The Open Championship	1	CUT	CUT	CUT	T8	T7	CUT
PGA Championship	CUT	CUT	T34	T60	CUT	T2	T24

Tournament	2010	2011	2012	2013	2014	2015	2016
Masters Tournament	CUT			CUT			
U.S. Open	T14						
The Open Championship	CUT	CUT	CUT	T64	CUT	CUT	CUT
PGA Championship	CUT		T11	T66			

Win
Top 10
Did not play

CUT = missed the half-way cut
"T" indicates a tie for a place

=== Summary ===
Tournament	Wins	2nd	3rd	Top-5	Top-10	Top-25	Events	Cuts made
Masters Tournament	0	0	0	0	0	0	8	2
U.S. Open	0	0	0	0	0	1	7	5
The Open Championship	1	0	0	1	3	3	14	4
PGA Championship	0	1	0	1	1	3	10	6
Totals	1	1	0	2	4	7	39	17

- Most consecutive cuts made – 4 (2008 Open Championship – 2009 U.S. Open)
- Longest streak of top-10s – 2 (2008 Open Championship – 2008 PGA)

== Results in The Players Championship ==
Tournament	2004	2005	2006	2007	2008	2009	2010	2011	2012	2013
The Players Championship	CUT	CUT	CUT	CUT	T42	T22	T66	T50	T2	T75

Top 10

CUT = missed the halfway cut
"T" indicates a tie for a place

== Results in World Golf Championships ==
Tournament	2003	2004	2005	2006	2007	2008	2009	2010
Match Play		R32					R64	
Championship	T30				T58		T28	
Invitational	T66			T42	80		T64	T39
Champions								

Did not play

QF, R16, R32, R64 = Round in which player lost in match play
"T" = tied
Note that the HSBC Champions did not become a WGC event until 2009.

== U.S. national team appearances ==
Amateur

- Palmer Cup: 1999 (winners)
- Eisenhower Trophy: 2000 (winners)

Professional

- Ryder Cup: 2008 (winners)
- World Cup: 2008

== See also ==
- 2002 PGA Tour Qualifying School graduates
