= 2003 WGC-World Cup =

Coordinates: 32°36′34″N 80°05′52″W

2003 World Cup
Tournament information
- Dates: November 13–16
- Location: Kiawah Island, South Carolina, U.S.
- Courses: Kiawah Island Golf Resort; Ocean Course
- Format: 72 holes stroke play (best ball & alternate shot)

Statistics
- Par: 72
- Length: 7,296 yards (6,671 m)
- Field: 24 two-man teams
- Cut: None
- Prize fund: US$4.0 million
- Winner's share: US$1.4 million

Champion
- South Africa; Rory Sabbatini & Trevor Immelman
- 275 (−13)

The 2003 WGC-World Cup took place November 13–16 at the Kiawah Island Golf Resort, Ocean Course in Kiawah Island, South Carolina, U.S. It was the 49th World Cup and the fourth as a World Golf Championship event. 24 countries competed and each country sent two players. The prize money totaled $4,000,000 with $1,400,000 going to the winning pair. The South African team of Rory Sabbatini and Trevor Immelman won. They won by four strokes over the English team of Paul Casey and Justin Rose.

== Qualification and format ==
18 teams qualified based on the Official World Golf Ranking and were joined by six teams via qualifiers in Singapore and Mexico.

The tournament was a 72-hole stroke play team event with each team consisting of two players. The first and third days were fourball play and the second and final days were foursomes play.

== Teams ==
Country	Players
Argentina	Ángel Cabrera and Eduardo Romero
Australia	Stephen Leaney and Stuart Appleby
Chile	Felipe Aguilar and Roy Mackenzie
Denmark	Anders Hansen and Søren Kjeldsen
England	Paul Casey and Justin Rose
France	Raphaël Jacquelin and Thomas Levet
Germany	Alex Čejka and Marcel Siem
Hong Kong	Derek Fung and James Stewart
India	Gaurav Ghei and Digvijay Singh
Ireland	Pádraig Harrington and Paul McGinley
Japan	Shigeki Maruyama and Hidemichi Tanaka
Mexico	Antonio Maldonado and Alex Quiroz
Myanmar	Aung Win and Kyi Hla Han
New Zealand	Michael Campbell and David Smail
Paraguay	Carlos Franco and Marco Ruiz
Scotland	Alastair Forsyth and Paul Lawrie
South Africa	Trevor Immelman and Rory Sabbatini
South Korea	K. J. Choi and Hur Suk-ho
Spain	Ignacio Garrido and Miguel Ángel Jiménez
Sweden	Niclas Fasth and Freddie Jacobson
Thailand	Jamnian Chitprasong and Pomsakonm Tipsanit
Trinidad and Tobago	Robert Ames and Stephen Ames
United States	Jim Furyk and Justin Leonard
Wales	Bradley Dredge and Ian Woosnam

== Scores ==
Place	Country	Score	To par	Money (US$)
1	South Africa	70-69-63-73=275	−13	1,400,000
2	England	73-73-66-67=279	−9	700,000
3	France	69-72-68-71=280	−8	400,000
4	Germany	67-77-67-71=282	−6	200,000
T5	Ireland	74-77-66-67=284	−4	135,000
T5	United States	71-70-68-75=284	−4	135,000
T7	Japan	74-71-71-69=285	−3	102,500
T7	Sweden	72-72-67-74=285	−3	102,500
T9	Paraguay	70-75-70-71=286	−2	71,667
T9	Scotland	71-73-68-74=286	−2	71,667
T9	South Korea	71-75-71-69=286	−2	71,667
12	Wales	68-74-71-75=288	E	60,000
13	Argentina	70-73-70-76=289	+1	55,000
14	Spain	71-75-66-81=293	+5	50,000
T15	Australia	72-76-71-75=294	+6	48,000
T15	New Zealand	71-74-72-77=294	+6	48,000
T15	Trinidad and Tobago	75-81-67-71=294	+6	48,000
18	Mexico	71-78-70-79=298	+10	46,000
19	Denmark	72-84-72-73=301	+13	45,000
20	Myanmar	72-83-73-74=302	+14	44,000
21	Hong Kong	76-80-69-78=303	+15	43,000
22	India	81-83-71-69=304	+16	42,000
23	Thailand	76-78-76-84=314	+26	41,000
WD	Chile	WD after nine holes		
