= Ignacio Garrido =

Spanish professional golfer

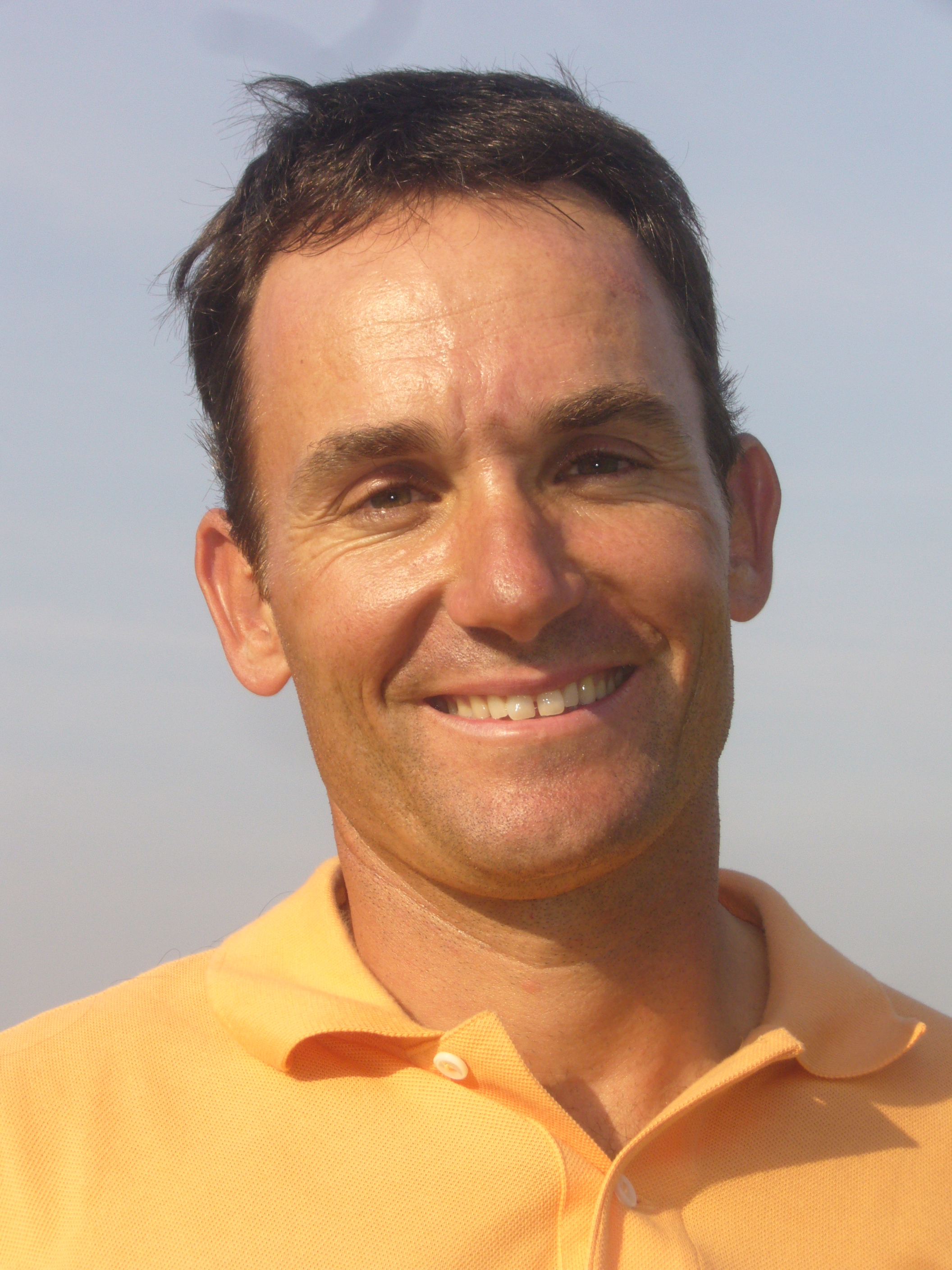

Personal information
- Full name: Ignacio Garrido
- Nationality: Spain
- Born: 27 March 1972 (age 54) Madrid, Spain
- Height: 5 ft 11 in (1.80 m)
- Weight: 80 kg (176 lb; 12 st 8 lb)
- Children: 1

Career
- Sport: Golf
- Turned professional: 1993
- Former tour: European Tour
- Professional wins: 4
- Highest ranking: 62 (25 May 2003)

Number of wins by tour
- European Tour: 2
- Challenge Tour: 1
- Other: 1

Best results in major championships
- Masters Tournament: CUT: 1998
- PGA Championship: T41: 1997
- U.S. Open: CUT: 1998
- The Open Championship: T14: 2010

Ignacio Garrido (born 27 March 1972) is a Spanish professional golfer who won twice on the European Tour.

== Early life ==
In 1972, Garrido was born in Madrid, Spain. He is the eldest son of Antonio Garrido who won five times on the European Tour and also played in the 1979 Ryder Cup.

His uncle, Germán Garrido, also has won on the European Tour.

== Professional career ==
In 1993, Garrido turned professional. He played on the Challenge Tour that year.

In 1994, Garrido joined the European Tour. His best year on the Tour was 1997, when he finished sixth on the Order of Merit. Garrido and his father were the first father and son combination to have won on the European Tour since it began in 1972.

One of the highlights of his career was playing for Europe winning the 1997 Ryder Cup on Spanish soil, for the first time in Europe played outside the British Isles and with Seve Ballesteros as the first Spanish captain of the European team. The Garridos were the second father and son combination to have played in the Ryder Cup after Percy and Peter Alliss.

Another highlight of Garrido's career was winning the prestigious Volvo PGA Championship at Wentworth Club, England, in 2003, beating Trevor Immelman in a playoff.

== Professional wins (4) ==
=== European Tour wins (2) ===
Legend
Flagship events (1)
Other European Tour (1)

No.	Date	Tournament	Winning score	Margin of victory	Runner-up
1	22 Jun 1997	Volvo German Open	−13 (65-67-67-72=271)	4 strokes	(England) Russell Claydon
2	25 May 2003	Volvo PGA Championship	−18 (70-69-66-65=270)	Playoff	(South Africa) Trevor Immelman

European Tour playoff record (1–1)

No.	Year	Tournament	Opponent	Result
1	2003	Volvo PGA Championship	(South Africa) Trevor Immelman	Won with birdie on first extra hole
2	2008	Open de España	(Republic of Ireland) Peter Lawrie	Lost to par on second extra hole

=== Challenge Tour wins (1) ===
No.	Date	Tournament	Winning score	Margin of victory	Runner-up
1	13 Jun 1993	Challenge AGF	−8 (67-75-72-66=280)	Playoff	(Italy) Marcello Santi

=== Other wins (1) ===
No.	Date	Tournament	Winning score	Margin of victory	Runner-up
1	10 Nov 1996	Hassan II Golf Trophy	−13 (69-68-72-70=279)	2 strokes	(Zimbabwe) Nick Price

== Results in major championships ==
Tournament	1997	1998	1999
Masters Tournament		CUT	
U.S. Open		CUT	
The Open Championship	CUT	T57	
PGA Championship	T41	CUT	

Tournament	2000	2001	2002	2003	2004	2005	2006	2007	2008	2009	2010
Masters Tournament											
U.S. Open											
The Open Championship				CUT	T54	CUT					T14
PGA Championship				CUT							

Did not play

CUT = missed the half-way cut
"T" = tied

== Results in World Golf Championships ==
Tournament	2003
Match Play	
Championship	T10
Invitational	T77

Top 10
Did not play

"T" = Tied

== Team appearances ==
Amateur

- European Boys' Team Championship (representing Spain): 1990 (winners)
- European Amateur Team Championship (representing Spain): 1991
- Eisenhower Trophy (representing Spain): 1992
- St Andrews Trophy (representing the Continent of Europe): 1992

Professional

- Dunhill Cup (representing Spain): 1995, 1996, 1997
- World Cup (representing Spain): 1995, 1996, 1997, 2003
- Ryder Cup (representing Europe): 1997 (winners)
- Seve Trophy (representing Continental Europe): 2003

== Equipment ==
- Irons - Mizuno MX-200 3-PW, KBS X flex
- Utility - Mizuno MP-Fli Hi 18 degree
- Wedges - Mizuno MX Chrome 51, MPT-10 White Satin 58deg
