= 2003 Seve Trophy =

- Dates: 6–9 November
- Venue: Campo de Golf Parador El Saler
- Location: Valencia, Spain
- Captains: Seve Ballesteros (Europe); Colin Montgomerie (GB&I)
(Europe)	13	15	(United Kingdom) (Republic of Ireland)
- Great Britain and Ireland wins the Seve Trophy

The 2003 Seve Trophy took place 6–9 November at Campo de Golf Parador El Saler, Valencia, Spain. The team captain for Continental Europe was Seve Ballesteros, with the team captain for Great Britain and Ireland being Colin Montgomerie. The competition was won by Great Britain and Ireland.

== Format ==
For the first time the event was staged over four days. There were five fourball matches on both Thursday and Friday, four greensomes matches on Saturday morning, four foursomes matches on Saturday afternoon and ten singles matches on Sunday. If the score finished at 14–14, then two players from each team (but not either captain) would play a two-hole play-off using the greensomes format to find the winner.

Each member of the winner team received €150,000, the losing team €70,000 each, giving a total prize fund of €2,200,000.

== Teams ==
Both captains played and had one wild card selection each. The remaining 8 players were the leading four players from the Official World Golf Ranking after the 2003 Telefónica Open de Madrid and the leading four players (not qualified from the World Rankings) from the Volvo Order of Merit after the 2003 Telefónica Open de Madrid.

Team Continental Europe
Name	Country	Qualification
Seve Ballesteros	Spain	Playing captain
Thomas Bjørn	Denmark	World ranking
Alex Čejka	Germany	World ranking
Sergio García	Spain	World ranking
Freddie Jacobson	Sweden	World ranking
Niclas Fasth	Sweden	Order of Merit
Ignacio Garrido	Spain	Order of Merit
Raphaël Jacquelin	France	Order of Merit
Miguel Ángel Jiménez	Spain	Order of Merit
José María Olazábal	Spain	Captain's pick

Team GB&I
Name	Country	Qualification
Colin Montgomerie	Scotland	Playing captain
Paul Casey	England	World ranking
Pádraig Harrington	Ireland	World ranking
Ian Poulter	England	World ranking
Justin Rose	England	World ranking
Brian Davis	England	Order of Merit
David Howell	England	Order of Merit
Phillip Price	Wales	Order of Merit
Lee Westwood	England	Order of Merit
Paul Lawrie	Scotland	Captain's pick

David Howell replaced Darren Clarke who was playing in the 2003 Tour Championship which was being playing in the same week.

== Day one ==
Thursday, 6 November 2003

=== Fourball ===
	Results
Westwood/Howell	(United Kingdom) (Republic of Ireland) 2 up	Olazábal/Ballesteros
Davis/Casey	(United Kingdom) (Republic of Ireland) 2 & 1	Garrido/Jiménez
Rose/Poulter	(Europe) 4 & 3	Čejka/Jacquelin
Lawrie/Montgomerie	halved	Jacobson/Fasth
Price/Harrington	(United Kingdom) (Republic of Ireland) 2 up	Bjørn/García
3½	Session	1½
3½	Overall	1½

== Day two ==
Friday, 7 November 2003

=== Fourball ===
	Results
Westwood/Howell	(United Kingdom) (Republic of Ireland) 5 & 3	Bjørn/García
Lawrie/Montgomerie	(Europe) 2 & 1	Čejka/Jacquelin
Davis/Casey	(United Kingdom) (Republic of Ireland) 2 up	Garrido/Jiménez
Price/Harrington	(Europe) 1 up	Jacobson/Fasth
Rose/Poulter	(United Kingdom) (Republic of Ireland) 3 & 1	Olazábal/Ballesteros
3	Session	2
6½	Overall	3½

== Day three ==
Saturday, 8 November 2003

=== Morning greensomes ===
	Results
Harrington/Lawrie	(Europe) 5 & 4	Jacobson/Fasth
Rose/Montgomerie	halved	Bjørn/Olazábal
Davis/Casey	(Europe) 3 & 2	Čejka/Jacquelin
Westwood/Poulter	(United Kingdom) (Republic of Ireland) 3 & 1	García/Ballesteros
1½	Session	2½
8	Overall	6

=== Afternoon foursomes ===
	Results
Harrington/Montgomerie	(United Kingdom) (Republic of Ireland) 2 & 1	Jiménez/Garrido
Lawrie/Casey	(Europe) 3 & 2	Jacobson/Fasth
Howell/Westwood	(Europe) 5 & 3	Čejka/Jacquelin
Rose/Poulter	(United Kingdom) (Republic of Ireland) 2 & 1	García/Bjørn
2	Session	2
10	Overall	8

== Day four ==
Sunday, 9 November 2003

=== Singles ===
	Results
Colin Montgomerie	(United Kingdom) (Republic of Ireland) 5 & 4	Seve Ballesteros
David Howell	(United Kingdom) (Republic of Ireland) 1 up	Alex Čejka
Paul Lawrie	(Europe) 3 & 2	Ignacio Garrido
Lee Westwood	(Europe) 2 & 1	Freddie Jacobson
Pádraig Harrington	halved	José María Olazábal
Ian Poulter	halved	Niclas Fasth
Paul Casey	(United Kingdom) (Republic of Ireland) Ret	Thomas Bjørn
Justin Rose	(United Kingdom) (Republic of Ireland) 3 & 2	Raphaël Jacquelin
Brian Davis	(Europe) 2 & 1	Miguel Ángel Jiménez
Phillip Price	(Europe) 4 & 3	Sergio García
5	Session	5
15	Overall	13

Thomas Bjørn was injured and retired from his match. Because he withdrew less than 30 minutes before games started Paul Casey was awarded the match. If Bjørn had retired earlier the match would have been declared as halved.
