= Raphaël Jacquelin =

French professional golfer (born 1974)

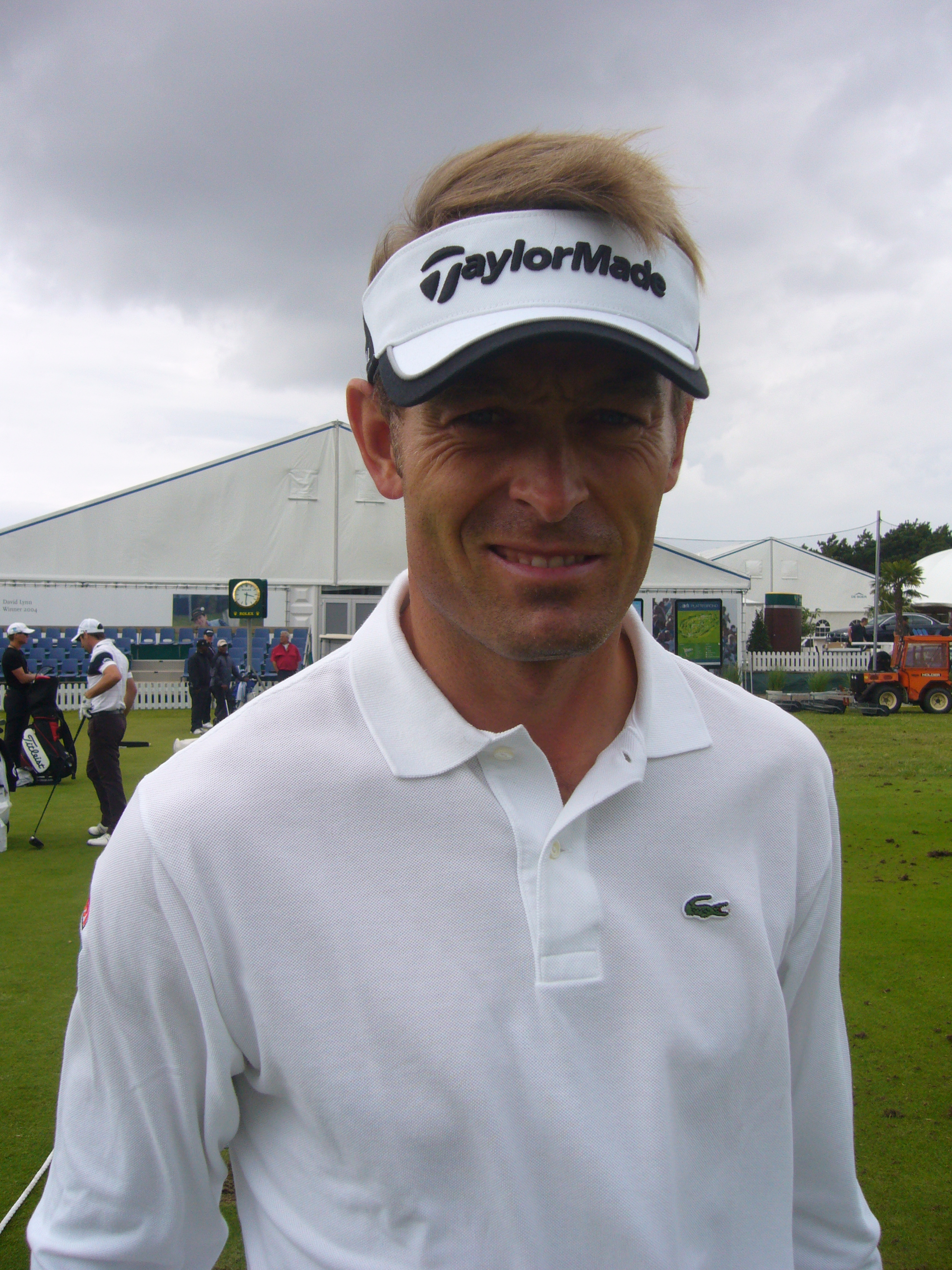

Personal information
- Nationality: France
- Born: 8 May 1974 (age 52) Lyon, France
- Height: 1.82 m (6 ft 0 in)
- Weight: 74 kg (163 lb; 11.7 st)
- Spouse: Fanny Jacquelin (m. 2004)
- Children: 3

Career
- Sport: Golf
- Turned professional: 1995
- Former tour: European Tour
- Professional wins: 8
- Highest ranking: 55 (15 July 2007)

Number of wins by tour
- European Tour: 4
- Asian Tour: 1
- Challenge Tour: 2
- Other: 2

Best results in major championships
- Masters Tournament: DNP
- PGA Championship: CUT: 2004, 2007, 2010, 2011
- U.S. Open: T21: 2012
- The Open Championship: 8th: 2011

Raphaël Jacquelin (born 8 May 1974) is a French professional golfer who plays on the European Tour.

== Career ==
Jacquelin was born in Lyon. He turned professional in 1995, after winning the French Amateur Championship.

Jacquelin began his professional career on the Challenge Tour. In 1997 he claimed two wins on his way to fourth on the season ending money list, which was sufficient to grant him full playing privileges on the European Tour for the following season.

Jacquelin had to wait for his first title at the top level, eventually winning on his 238th European Tour start at the 2005 Open de Madrid. His second victory came in 2007 at the BMW Asian Open. His best finish on the Order of Merit to date has been 20th in 2003.

During part of 2007 and 2008 Jacquelin was the highest ranked French golfer on the Official World Golf Ranking.

Jacquelin won his third Tour title in 2011 at the Sicilian Open with a one stroke victory over England's Anthony Wall. The event had to be concluded on a Monday after bad weather had curtailed Sunday's play. As a result of this win, Jacquelin climbed back into the world's top 100.

In April 2013, Jacquelin claimed his fourth European Tour title in a record equaling sudden-death playoff at the Open de España. After shooting a one-under-par 71 in the final round, Jacquelin was in a three-way tie at the top alongside Felipe Aguilar and Maximilian Kieffer. All three parred the first two playoff holes, before Aguilar was eliminated on the third when he could only make par. Jacquelin and Kieffer played the 18th hole five more times with scores of par made by both. Jacquelin had a putt on the eighth extra hole of six feet to win but could not convert, however at the ninth extra hole he hit his approach to five feet and when Kieffer could only par, Jacquelin converted to clinch victory. The playoff, lasting over two hours, was the joint longest (nine holes) in the history of the European Tour alongside the 1989 KLM Dutch Open.

== Amateur wins ==
- 1995 French Amateur Championship

== Professional wins (8) ==
=== European Tour wins (4) ===
No.	Date	Tournament	Winning score	Margin of victory	Runner(s)-up
1	16 Oct 2005	Open de Madrid	−23 (64-64-64-69=261)	3 strokes	(Scotland) Paul Lawrie
2	22 Apr 2007	BMW Asian Open^{1}	−10 (66-69-70-73=278)	2 strokes	(Denmark) Søren Kjeldsen
3	21 Mar 2011	Sicilian Open	−12 (66-69-69-68=272)	1 stroke	(England) Anthony Wall
4	21 Apr 2013	Open de España	−5 (73-66-73-71=283)	Playoff	(Chile) Felipe Aguilar, (Germany) Maximilian Kieffer

^{1}Co-sanctioned by the Asian Tour

European Tour playoff record (1–1)

No.	Year	Tournament	Opponents	Result
1	2004	Dunhill Championship	(France) Grégory Havret, (Germany) Marcel Siem	Siem won with birdie on third extra hole Havret eliminated by birdie on second hole
2	2013	Open de España	(Chile) Felipe Aguilar, (Germany) Maximilian Kieffer	Won with birdie on ninth extra hole Aguilar eliminated by birdie on third hole

=== Challenge Tour wins (2) ===
No.	Date	Tournament	Winning score	Margin of victory	Runners-up
1	22 Jun 1997	Memorial Olivier Barras	−5 (68-69=137) (Note: Shortened to 36 holes due to weather.)	2 strokes	(Switzerland) Carlos Duran, (England) Denny Lucas, (England) Gary Marks, (England) Matt McGuire, (Argentina) Marcos Moreno, (Italy) Mario Tadini
2	31 Aug 1997	Steelcover Dutch Challenge	−11 (68-71-68-70=277)	3 strokes	(England) Andrew Butterfield, (Australia) Mathew Goggin, (England) Roger Winchester

=== French Tour wins (1) ===
No.	Date	Tournament	Winning score	Margin of victory	Runner-up
1	23 Nov 2013	Richard Mille Invitational	3 and 1		(France) Édouard Dubois

=== Other wins (1) ===
- 1997 Championnat de France Pro

== Results in major championships ==
Tournament	1997	1998	1999
Masters Tournament			
U.S. Open			
The Open Championship	CUT		
PGA Championship			

Tournament	2000	2001	2002	2003	2004	2005	2006	2007	2008	2009
Masters Tournament										
U.S. Open										CUT
The Open Championship		T13	CUT	T53	T54			T65		CUT
PGA Championship					CUT			CUT		

Tournament	2010	2011	2012	2013	2014	2015
Masters Tournament						
U.S. Open			T21			
The Open Championship		8	CUT			CUT
PGA Championship	CUT	CUT				

Top 10
Did not play

CUT = missed the half-way cut
"T" = tied

=== Summary ===
Tournament	Wins	2nd	3rd	Top-5	Top-10	Top-25	Events	Cuts made
Masters Tournament	0	0	0	0	0	0	0	0
U.S. Open	0	0	0	0	0	1	2	1
The Open Championship	0	0	0	0	1	2	10	5
PGA Championship	0	0	0	0	0	0	4	0
Totals	0	0	0	0	1	3	16	6

== Results in World Golf Championships ==
Tournament	2003	2004	2005	2006	2007	2008	2009	2010	2011	2012	2013
Match Play											
Championship	T59										
Invitational					T77						
Champions											73

Did not play

"T" = Tied

== Team appearances ==
Amateur

- European Amateur Team Championship (representing France): 1995

Professional

- Alfred Dunhill Cup (representing France): 2000
- World Cup (representing France): 2001, 2002, 2003, 2004, 2005, 2006, 2007, 2011
- Seve Trophy (representing Continental Europe): 2002, 2003, 2007, 2011
