= Trevor Immelman =

South African professional golfer (born 1979)

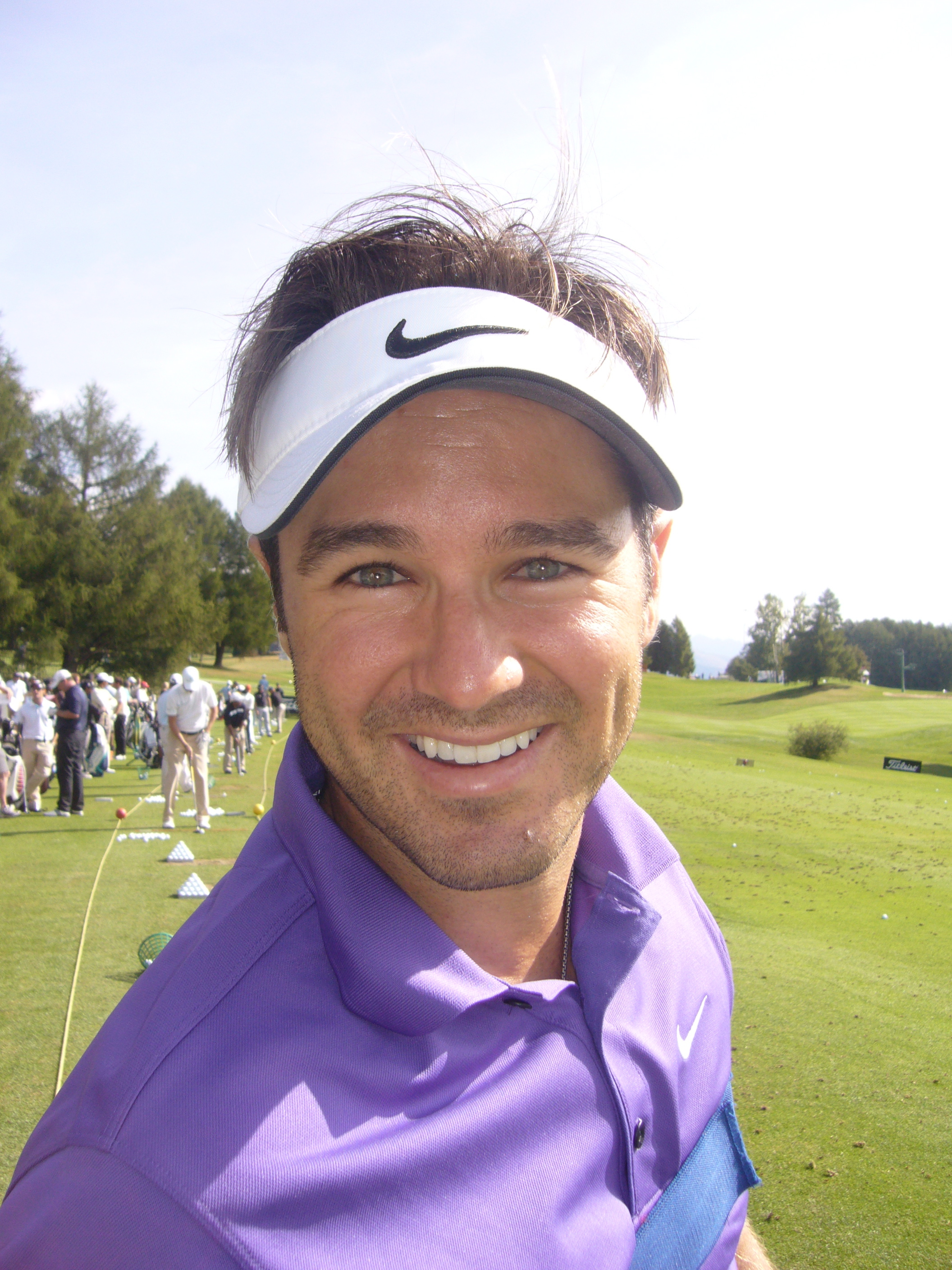
- Immelman in 2009

Personal information
- Full name: Trevor John Immelman
- Nationality: South Africa
- Born: 16 December 1979 (age 46) Cape Town, South Africa
- Height: 5 ft 9 in (1.75 m)
- Weight: 170 lb (77 kg; 12 st)
- Spouse: Carminita (m. 2003)
- Children: 2

Career
- Sport: Golf
- Turned professional: 1999
- Former tours: PGA Tour; European Tour; Sunshine Tour
- Professional wins: 11
- Highest ranking: 12 (17 September 2006)

Number of wins by tour
- PGA Tour: 2
- European Tour: 4
- Sunshine Tour: 5
- Korn Ferry Tour: 1
- Challenge Tour: 1
- Other: 1

Best results in major championships (wins: 1)
- Masters Tournament: Won: 2008
- PGA Championship: T6: 2007
- U.S. Open: T21: 2006
- The Open Championship: T15: 2005

Achievements and awards
- Sunshine Tour Rookie of the Year: 2000–01
- Sunshine Tour Order of Merit winner: 2002–03
- PGA Tour Rookie of the Year: 2006

Trevor John Immelman (born 16 December 1979) is a South African retired professional golfer and television commentator who has played on the PGA Tour, European Tour and Sunshine Tour. He won his sole major championship at the 2008 Masters Tournament. He is the chairman of the Official World Golf Ranking board.

== Early life and amateur career ==
Immelman was born in Cape Town, South Africa. He was born into a golfing family. His father, Johan, is the former commissioner of the Sunshine Tour in South Africa, while his older brother Mark is a broadcaster, teaching pro, and collegiate golf coach. He also has an older sister by the name of Michelle Greeff. Trevor took up golf at the age of five. He attended Hottentots Holland High School.

Immelman had much success as amateur. He won the South African Amateur Championship in 1997. In 1998, he finished runner-up at the New Zealand Amateur. He also won the U.S. Amateur Public Links in 1998.

== Professional career ==
In 1999, Immelman turned professional. In 2000, he played mainly on the second tier professional tour in Europe, the Challenge Tour, and finished tenth on the Order of Merit. He became a full member of the European Tour in 2001 and has made the top twenty of the Order of Merit three times. He has four wins on the European Tour and in 2004 became the first man to successfully defend the South African Open title since Gary Player in the 1970s.

In 2003, Immelman won the WGC-World Cup for South Africa in partnership with Rory Sabbatini. In 2005 he was a member of the losing International Team at the Presidents Cup. He played with increasing frequency on the PGA Tour after receiving a 2-year PGA Tour exemption for 2006 and 2007 on account of this Presidents Cup appearance. In 2006 Immelman won his first PGA Tour event at the Cialis Western Open, a result that moved him into the top 15 in the Official World Golf Rankings. He won the Sunshine Tour Order of Merit in 2002/03.

Immelman withdrew from the 2006 Open Championship to be present for the birth of his first child. He finished 2006 in the top 10 of the PGA Tour money list, was named Rookie of the Year, and reached a career-high world ranking of twelfth. In September 2007, Trevor Immelman was picked by Gary Player to participate in the 7th Presidents Cup held at the Royal Montreal Golf Club, Canada. The International team lost 14.5 to the US team's 19.5.

On 13 December 2007, Immelman withdrew from the South African Airways Open due to severe discomfort around his ribcage area and a problem breathing. He went into surgery the following Tuesday, 18 December 2007, and doctors discovered a lesion approximately the size of a golf ball on his diaphragm. (Immelman remarked in an interview on the obvious irony of the size of the lesion). It was diagnosed as a calcified fibrosis tumor. After more tests they discovered that it was benign. Nevertheless, treatment and recovery caused him to miss the first eight weeks of the 2008 PGA Tour season. However, Immelman came back to win the 2008 Masters Tournament. Despite scoring a double bogey on the 70th hole, the par 3 16th, Immelman finished with a score of 8 under par, beating favourite Tiger Woods by three strokes.

In June 2009, Immelman announced he would withdraw from the U.S. Open due to tendonitis in his left wrist and elbow, which plagued him for much of the 2009 and 2010 seasons. As the 2013 PGA Tour neared its conclusion, Immelman's winless streak extended to five years; he was forced to play in the Web.com Tour Finals after he failed to make the FedEx Cup playoffs and his five-year exemption for winning the Masters expired. Immelman won the Hotel Fitness Championship, the first of four Web.com Tour Finals tournaments, and finished the Finals in sixth place to regain his PGA Tour card for 2014.

2018 saw a resurgence in Immelman's career. Focusing on the European Tour, he made the cut in 8 out of 13 events, with a best finish of T3 at the Scottish Open. In the event he had a chance to qualify for The Open Championship via the Open Qualifying Series, but missed an eight-foot birdie putt on the last and lost out to Jens Dantorp by world rankings. However, with the finish, Immelman moved from 1,380th in the world to 420th, his highest ranking since 2014. Immelman finished 77th on the Race to Dubai standings, regaining full status for the 2019 season.

In September 2022, Immelman captained the International team in the 2022 Presidents Cup at Quail Hollow Club in Charlotte, North Carolina. The U.S. team won 17.5–12.5.

=== Broadcasting career ===
In 2017, 2018 and 2019, Turner Sports utilized Immelman as an analyst for coverage of the PGA Championship on TNT.

In December 2019, Immelman joined the PGA Tour on CBS commentating team. After Nick Faldo retired from CBS in 2022, Immelman was named the new lead golf analyst for 2023.

=== OWGR Chairman ===
Immelman was announced as the chairman of the Official World Golf Ranking starting April 2025.

== Personal life ==
Immelman married his childhood sweetheart, Carminita, on 6 December 2003. He has frequently participated in his mentor Gary Player's charity golf events around the world to help raise funds for children's causes. Immelman has a residence in Winter Park, Florida that he purchased in 2016 from former professional football player Jeff Faine.

== Amateur wins ==
- 1996 Junior PGA Championship
- 1997 South African Amateur
- 1998 U.S. Amateur Public Links

== Professional wins (11) ==
=== PGA Tour wins (2) ===
Legend
Major championships (1)
Other PGA Tour (1)

No.	Date	Tournament	Winning score	Margin of victory	Runner(s)-up
1	9 Jul 2006	Cialis Western Open	−13 (69-66-69-67=271)	2 strokes	(United States) Tiger Woods, (Australia) Mathew Goggin
2	13 Apr 2008	Masters Tournament	−8 (68-68-69-75=280)	3 strokes	(United States) Tiger Woods

PGA Tour playoff record (0–2)

No.	Year	Tournament	Opponent(s)	Result
1	2006	Wachovia Championship	(United States) Jim Furyk	Lost to par on first extra hole
2	2008	Stanford St. Jude Championship	(Australia) Robert Allenby, (United States) Justin Leonard	Leonard won with birdie on second extra hole

=== European Tour wins (4) ===
Legend
Major championships (1)
Other European Tour (3)

No.	Date	Tournament	Winning score	Margin of victory	Runner(s)-up
1	12 Jan 2003	South African Airways Open^{1}	−14 (70-71-66-67=274)	Playoff	(South Africa) Tim Clark
2	18 Jan 2004	South African Airways Open^{1} (2)	−12 (71-69-69-67=276)	3 strokes	(Scotland) Alastair Forsyth, (England) Steve Webster
3	23 May 2004	Deutsche Bank - SAP Open TPC of Europe	−17 (65-72-69-65=271)	1 stroke	(Republic of Ireland) Pádraig Harrington
4	13 Apr 2008	Masters Tournament	−8 (68-68-69-75=280)	3 strokes	(United States) Tiger Woods

^{1}Co-sanctioned by the Sunshine Tour

European Tour playoff record (1–2)

No.	Year	Tournament	Opponent(s)	Result
1	2003	South African Airways Open	(South Africa) Tim Clark	Won with birdie on first extra hole
2	2003	Dunhill Championship	(England) Mark Foster, (Denmark) Anders Hansen, (Scotland) Paul Lawrie, (Scotland) Doug McGuigan, (South Africa) Bradford Vaughan	Foster won with eagle on second extra hole Hansen and McGuigan eliminated by birdie on first hole
3	2003	Volvo PGA Championship	(Spain) Ignacio Garrido	Lost to birdie on first extra hole

=== Sunshine Tour wins (5) ===
Legend
Flagship events (2)
Other Sunshine Tour (3)

No.	Date	Tournament	Winning score	Margin of victory	Runner(s)-up
1	10 Dec 2000	Vodacom Players Championship	−9 (67-75-68-69=279)	3 strokes	(South Africa) Ernie Els, (South Africa) Titch Moore
2	12 Jan 2003	South African Airways Open^{1}	−14 (70-71-66-67=274)	Playoff	(South Africa) Tim Clark
3	26 Jan 2003	Dimension Data Pro-Am	−17 (67-68-65-71=271)	1 stroke	(South Africa) Andrew McLardy, (United States) Bruce Vaughan
4	18 Jan 2004	South African Airways Open^{1} (2)	−12 (71-69-69-67=276)	3 strokes	(Scotland) Alastair Forsyth, (England) Steve Webster
5	2 Dec 2007	Nedbank Golf Challenge	−16 (67-66-67-72=272)	1 stroke	(England) Justin Rose

^{1}Co-sanctioned by the European Tour

Sunshine Tour playoff record (1–1)

No.	Year	Tournament	Opponent(s)	Result
1	2003	South African Airways Open	(South Africa) Tim Clark	Won with birdie on first extra hole
2	2003	Dunhill Championship	(England) Mark Foster, (Denmark) Anders Hansen, (Scotland) Paul Lawrie, (Scotland) Doug McGuigan, (South Africa) Bradford Vaughan	Foster won with eagle on second extra hole Hansen and McGuigan eliminated by birdie on first hole

=== Web.com Tour wins (1) ===
Legend
Finals events (1)
Other Web.com Tour (0)

No.	Date	Tournament	Winning score	Margin of victory	Runner-up
1	1 Sep 2013	Hotel Fitness Championship	−20 (67-66-69-66=268)	1 stroke	(United States) Patrick Cantlay

=== Challenge Tour wins (1) ===
No.	Date	Tournament	Winning score	Margin of victory	Runner-up
1	12 Mar 2000	Tusker Kenya Open	−14 (67-69-67-67=270)	4 strokes	(Sweden) Henrik Stenson

=== Other wins (1) ===
Legend
World Golf Championships (1)
Other wins (0)

No.	Date	Tournament	Winning score	Margin of victory	Runners-up
1	16 Nov 2003	WGC-World Cup (with (South Africa) Rory Sabbatini)	−13 (70-69-63-73=275)	4 strokes	England − Paul Casey and Justin Rose

== Major championships ==
=== Wins (1) ===
Year	Championship	54 holes	Winning score	Margin	Runner-up
2008	Masters Tournament	2 shot lead	−8 (68-68-69-75=280)	3 strokes	(United States) Tiger Woods

=== Results timeline ===
Tournament	1999	2000	2001	2002	2003	2004	2005	2006	2007	2008	2009
Masters Tournament	56					CUT	T5	CUT	T55	1	T20
U.S. Open					CUT	T55		T21	CUT	T65	
The Open Championship				T43	T53	T42	T15		T60	T19	
PGA Championship					T48	T37	T17	T34	T6	CUT	

Tournament	2010	2011	2012	2013	2014	2015	2016	2017	2018
Masters Tournament	T14	T15	60	T50	CUT	CUT	CUT	CUT	CUT
U.S. Open	CUT	CUT	CUT						
The Open Championship	T23	T38	CUT						
PGA Championship	CUT	T12	T27						

Tournament	2019
Masters Tournament	T51
PGA Championship	
U.S. Open	
The Open Championship	

Win
Top 10
Did not play

CUT = missed the half-way cut
"T" = tied

=== Summary ===
Tournament	Wins	2nd	3rd	Top-5	Top-10	Top-25	Events	Cuts made
Masters Tournament	1	0	0	2	2	5	17	10
PGA Championship	0	0	0	0	1	3	9	7
U.S. Open	0	0	0	0	0	1	8	3
The Open Championship	0	0	0	0	0	3	9	8
Totals	1	0	0	2	3	12	43	28

- Most consecutive cuts made – 6 (2004 U.S. Open – 2005 PGA)
- Longest streak of top-10s – 2 (2007 PGA – 2008 Masters)

== Results in The Players Championship ==
Tournament	2003	2004	2005	2006	2007	2008	2009	2010	2011	2012
The Players Championship	CUT	WD			CUT		CUT	CUT	T33	T56

Did not play

CUT = missed the half-way cut
WD = Withdrew
"T" indicates a tie for a place

== Results in World Golf Championships ==
Tournament	2002	2003	2004	2005	2006	2007	2008	2009
Match Play		R64	R32	R64		3	R32	R64
Championship	T27	T44	T23		T9	T35	T40	T70
Invitational		T9	T32	T19	T13	T36	T36	T60
Champions								

Top 10
Did not play

"T" indicates a tie for a place.
QF, R16, R32, R64 = Round in which player lost in match play
Note that the HSBC Champions did not become a WGC event until 2009.

== Team appearances ==
Amateur

- Eisenhower Trophy (representing South Africa): 1998

Professional

- World Cup (representing South Africa): 2003 (winners), 2004, 2005, 2007
- Presidents Cup (International Team): 2005, 2007, 2022 (non-playing captain)

== See also ==
- 2013 Web.com Tour Finals graduates
