= Brian Davis (golfer) =

English professional golfer (born 1974)

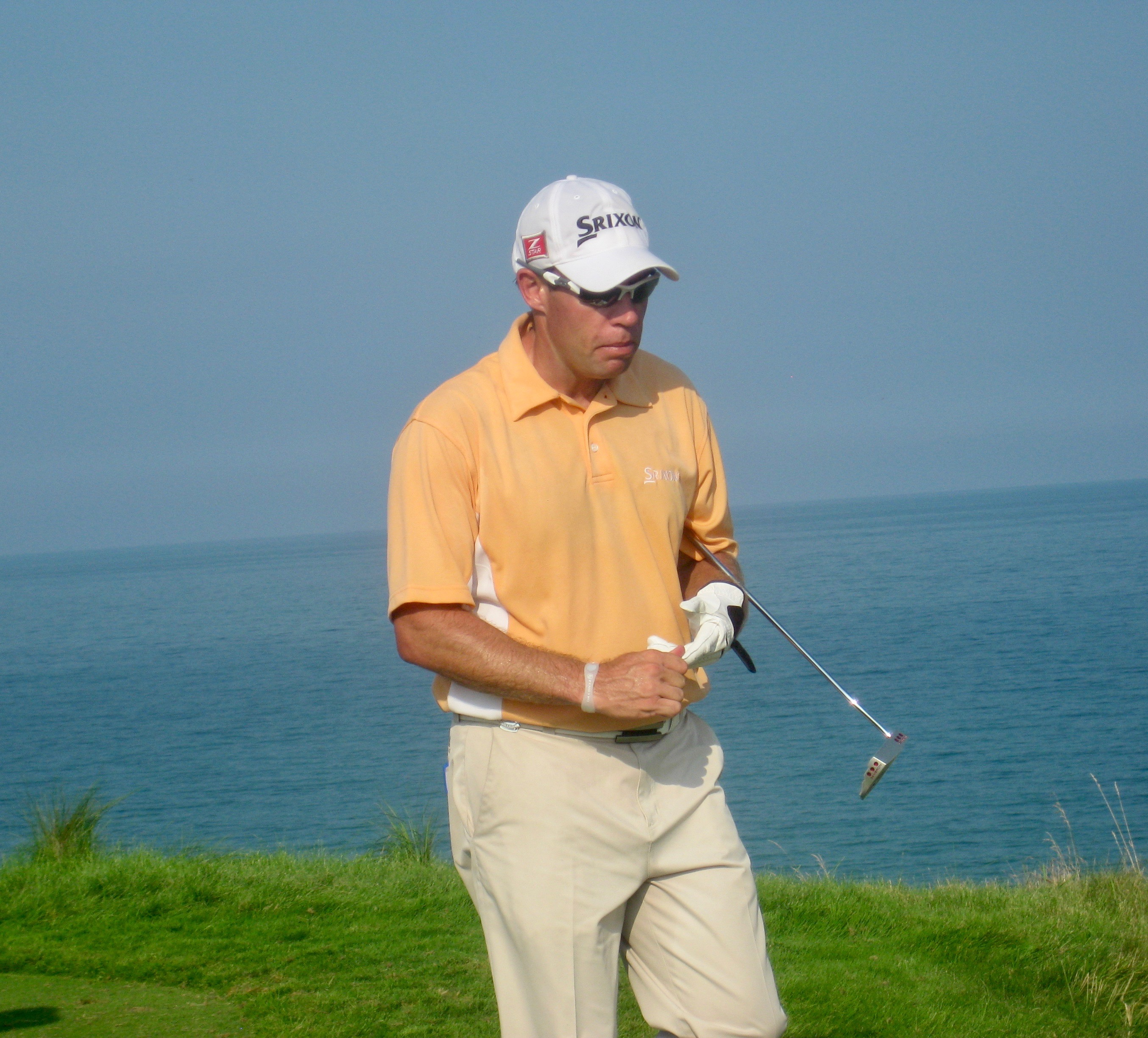
- Davis at the 2010 PGA Championship

Personal information
- Full name: Brian Lester Davis
- Nationality: England
- Born: 2 August 1974 (age 52) London, England
- Height: 5 ft 11 in (1.80 m)
- Weight: 185 lb (84 kg; 13.2 st)
- Spouse: Dee Davis
- Children: 6

Career
- Sport: Golf
- Turned professional: 1994
- Former tours: European Tour; Web.com Tour; PGA Tour
- Professional wins: 2
- Highest ranking: 45 (14 March 2004)

Number of wins by tour
- European Tour: 2
- PGA Tour of Australasia: 1

Best results in major championships
- Masters Tournament: CUT: 2004
- PGA Championship: T13: 2004
- U.S. Open: T61: 2003
- The Open Championship: T6: 2003

Brian Lester Davis (born 2 August 1974) is an English professional golfer.

== Career ==
Davis was born in London. He turned professional in 1994 and became a member of the European Tour in 1997. He performed steadily for his first six seasons on the Tour, and won the 2000 Peugeot Open de España. In 2003, despite not winning a tournament, he had his best season by far to that time, finishing ninth on the European Tour Order of Merit. The highlights of his season included finishing in a tie for sixth at The Open Championship, and placing third in the European Tour's tour championship, the Volvo Masters, as well as two second places in lower profile events and playing on the winning Great Britain and Ireland team in the Seve Trophy. His second European Tour win came in 2004 at the ANZ Championship and later that year he became the first Englishman to be medalist at the PGA Tour Qualifying Tournament. In 2005 he played on both the U.S.-based PGA Tour and the European Tour and in 2006 he concentrated more on the PGA Tour, making only a handful of appearances in Europe. Davis had two solid seasons on the PGA Tour in 2007 and 2008 where he finished inside the top 100 on the money list both times, including a runner-up at the Legends Reno-Tahoe Open.

2009 was a very consistent season for Davis. The season included 5th-place finishes at The Players Championship and the Valero Texas Open, followed by a third straight top 5 finish at the HP Byron Nelson Championship where he matched his best finish on the PGA Tour when he was runner-up behind Rory Sabbatini. He finished the season 43rd on the money list.

In April 2010 Davis called a two-stroke penalty on himself on the first play-off hole on Sunday to hand Jim Furyk a victory at the Verizon Heritage. Davis later received much praise for his decision which cost him a potential first PGA Tour victory. Davis finished second again later in 2010 at the Crowne Plaza Invitational at Colonial, three shots behind Zach Johnson.

Davis has featured in the top 50 of the Official World Golf Rankings.

== Amateur wins ==
- 1992 Peter McEvoy Trophy

== Professional wins (2) ==
=== European Tour wins (2) ===
No.	Date	Tournament	Winning score	Margin of victory	Runner-up
1	1 May 2000	Peugeot Open de España	−14 (71-68-66-69=274)	3 strokes	(Austria) Markus Brier
2	15 Feb 2004	ANZ Championship^{1}	44 pts (7-8-12-17=44)	1 point	(England) Paul Casey

^{1}Co-sanctioned by the PGA Tour of Australasia

European Tour playoff record (0–1)

No.	Year	Tournament	Opponents	Result
1	2005	Daily Telegraph Dunlop Masters	(Denmark) Thomas Bjørn, (England) David Howell	Bjørn won with par on second extra hole Davis eliminated by par on first hole

== Playoff record ==
PGA Tour playoff record (0–1)

No.	Year	Tournament	Opponent	Result
1	2010	Verizon Heritage	(United States) Jim Furyk	Lost to par on first extra hole

== Results in major championships ==
Tournament	1998	1999
Masters Tournament		
U.S. Open		
The Open Championship	CUT	T68
PGA Championship		

Tournament	2000	2001	2002	2003	2004	2005	2006	2007	2008	2009
Masters Tournament					CUT					
U.S. Open				T61	CUT					
The Open Championship	CUT			T6	CUT	CUT		T53		
PGA Championship				CUT	T13	CUT				CUT

Tournament	2010	2011	2012	2013	2014	2015	2016	2017	2018
Masters Tournament									
U.S. Open	CUT								
The Open Championship		CUT		CUT					
PGA Championship	T39	T19	CUT						

Tournament	2019
Masters Tournament	
PGA Championship	
U.S. Open	CUT
The Open Championship	

Top 10
Did not play

CUT = missed the half-way cut
"T" = tied

=== Summary ===
Tournament	Wins	2nd	3rd	Top-5	Top-10	Top-25	Events	Cuts made
Masters Tournament	0	0	0	0	0	0	1	0
PGA Championship	0	0	0	0	0	2	7	3
U.S. Open	0	0	0	0	0	0	4	1
The Open Championship	0	0	0	0	1	1	9	3
Totals	0	0	0	0	1	3	21	7

- Most consecutive cuts made – 2 (2003 U.S. Open – 2003 Open Championship)
- Longest streak of top-10s – 1

== Results in The Players Championship ==
Tournament	2004	2005	2006	2007	2008	2009	2010	2011	2012	2013	2014	2015
The Players Championship	CUT		T20	CUT	CUT	T5	CUT	T26	T25	T72	T11	CUT

Top 10
Did not play

CUT = missed the halfway cut
"T" indicates a tie for a place

== Results in World Golf Championships ==
Tournament	2003	2004
Match Play		R64
Championship	T35	
Invitational		

Did not play

QF, R16, R32, R64 = Round in which player lost in match play
"T" = Tied

== Team appearances ==
Amateur

- Jacques Léglise Trophy (representing Great Britain & Ireland): 1992 (winners)

Professional

- Alfred Dunhill Cup (representing England): 2000
- World Cup (representing England): 2000
- Seve Trophy (representing Great Britain & Ireland): 2003 (winners)

== See also ==
- 2004 PGA Tour Qualifying School graduates
- 2015 Web.com Tour Finals graduates
