= 1991 World Cup =

1991 World Cup may refer to:

- 1991 FIFA Women's World Cup
- 1991 World Cup (men's golf)
- 1991 Rugby World Cup
- 1991 Alpine Skiing World Cup
