= 1995 Open Championship =

Coordinates: 56.343°N 2.803°W

- Front cover of the 1995 Open Program

Tournament information
- Dates: 20–23 July 1995
- Location: St Andrews, Scotland
- Course: Old Course at St Andrews
- Tours: European Tour; PGA Tour

Statistics
- Par: 72
- Length: 6,933 yards (6,340 m)
- Field: 159 players, 103 after cut
- Cut: 148 (+4)
- Prize fund: £1,250,000 €1,876,980 $2,000,000
- Winner's share: £125,000 €175,000 $199,375

Champion
- (United States) John Daly
- 282 (−6), playoff

Location in Scotland

The 1995 Open Championship was a men's major golf championship and the 124th Open Championship held from 20 to 23 July at the Old Course at St Andrews in St Andrews, Scotland. John Daly won his first Open Championship and second major title in a four-hole playoff over Costantino Rocca.

This was the final Open appearance for two-time champion Arnold Palmer and the first appearance for three-time champion Tiger Woods.

== Course ==
The Old Course at St Andrews

Hole	Name	Yards	Par	Hole	Name	Yards	Par
1	Burn	370	4	10	Bobby Jones	342	4
2	Dyke	411	4	11	High (In)	172	3
3	Cartgate (Out)	371	4	12	Heathery (In)	316	4
4	Ginger Beer	463	4	13	Hole O'Cross (In)	425	4
5	Hole O'Cross (Out)	564	5	14	Long	567	5
6	Heathery (Out)	416	4	15	Cartgate (In)	413	4
7	High (Out)	372	4	16	Corner of the Dyke	382	4
8	Short	178	3	17	Road	461	4
9	End	356	4	18	Tom Morris	354	4
Out		3,501	36	In		3,432	36
				Total		6,933	72

Previous lengths of the course for The Open Championship (since 1950):

- 6,933 yards (6,340 m) – 1990, 1984, 1978
- 6,957 yards (6,361 m) – 1970:
- 6,926 yards (6,333 m) – 1964
- 6,936 yards (6,342 m) – 1960, 1955

== Round summaries ==
=== First round ===
Thursday, 20 July 1995

Place	Player	Score	To par
T1	(United States) Ben Crenshaw	67	−5
T1	(United States) John Daly	67	−5
T1	(Zimbabwe) Mark McNulty	67	−5
T1	(United States) Tom Watson	67	−5
T5	(Northern Ireland) David Feherty	68	−4
T5	(United States) Bill Glasson	68	−4
T5	(Sweden) Mats Hallberg	68	−4
T5	(Fiji) Vijay Singh	68	−4
T9	(Northern Ireland) Darren Clarke	69	−3
T9	(United States) John Cook	69	−3
T9	(United States) Jim Gallagher Jr.	69	−3
T9	(England) David Gilford	69	−3
T9	(Sweden) Per-Ulrik Johansson	69	−3
T9	(United States) Steve Lowery	69	−3
T9	(United States) Corey Pavin	69	−3
T9	(Italy) Costantino Rocca	69	−3
T9	(United States) Gene Sauers	69	−3

=== Second round ===
Friday, 21 July 1995

Place	Player	Score	To par
T1	(United States) John Daly	67-71=138	−6
T1	(United States) Brad Faxon	71-67=138	−6
T1	(Japan) Katsuyoshi Tomori	70-68=138	−6
T4	(United States) Mark Brooks	70-69=139	−5
T4	(United States) John Cook	69-70=139	−5
T4	(United States) Ben Crenshaw	67-72=139	−5
T4	(South Africa) Ernie Els	71-68=139	−5
T4	(United States) Corey Pavin	69-70=139	−5
T4	(Italy) Costantino Rocca	69-70=139	−5
T10	(United States) Justin Leonard	73-67=140	−4
T10	(Fiji) Vijay Singh	68-72=140	−4
T10	(United States) Payne Stewart	72-68=140	−4

Amateurs: Sherry (−3), Webster (−2), Woods (+1), Clark (+3), Gallacher (+7).

=== Third round ===
Saturday, 22 July 1995

Place	Player	Score	To par
1	(New Zealand) Michael Campbell	71-71-65=207	−9
2	(Italy) Costantino Rocca	69-70-70=209	−7
3	(Australia) Steve Elkington	72-69-69=210	−6
T4	(United States) John Daly	67-71-73=211	−5
T4	(South Africa) Ernie Els	71-68-72=211	−5
T4	(United States) Corey Pavin	69-70-72=211	−5
T4	(Japan) Katsuyoshi Tomori	70-68-73=211	−5
T8	(United States) Mark Brooks	70-69-73=212	−4
T8	(Scotland) Sam Torrance	71-70-71=212	−4
T10	(United States) Bob Estes	72-70-71=213	−3
T10	(United States) Brad Faxon	71-67-75=213	−3
T10	(England) Barry Lane	72-73-68=213	−3
T10	(Australia) Brett Ogle	73-69-71=213	−3
T10	(Fiji) Vijay Singh	68-72-73=213	−3
T10	(United States) Tom Watson	67-76-70=213	−3

=== Final round ===
Sunday, 23 July 1995

Place	Player	Score	To par	Money (£)
T1	(United States) John Daly	67-71-73-71=282	−6	Playoff
T1	(Italy) Costantino Rocca	69-70-70-73=282	−6	Playoff
T3	(England) Steven Bottomley	70-72-72-69=283	−5	65,667
T3	(United States) Mark Brooks	70-69-73-71=283	−5	65,667
T3	(New Zealand) Michael Campbell	71-71-65-76=283	−5	65,667
T6	(Australia) Steve Elkington	72-69-69-74=284	−4	40,500
T6	(Fiji) Vijay Singh	68-72-73-71=284	−4	40,500
T8	(United States) Bob Estes	72-70-71-72=285	−3	33,333
T8	(England) Mark James	72-75-68-70=285	−3	33,333
T8	(United States) Corey Pavin	69-70-72-74=285	−3	33,333

Amateurs: Webster (+1), Sherry (+3), Woods (+7), Clark (+13).

Early in the final round, John Daly moved clear with birdies at the 4th, 7th, and 8th holes, while Michael Campbell bogeyed the 5th and 6th. Mark Brooks was Daly's closest challenger for much of the day, but a double bogey on the 16th hole saw him fall back; a closing birdie on the 18th hole meant he tied Steven Bottomley's clubhouse score at 5 under par (283). Daly's lead had grown to three strokes on the 16th tee, but he made bogeys on both the 16th and 17th holes, where he hit his approach against the face of the Road Hole bunker. He finished his round at 6 under par (282). When Steve Elkington failed to birdie the 16th and bogeyed the 17th, Michael Campbell and Costantino Rocca with the only players remaining with a chance to match Daly's score. Rocca was one behind Daly playing the 17th hole; he hit his approach onto the road behind the green, but hit his recovery shot to 4 feet and made the putt for par to remain one stroke behind going to the final hole. Campbell made par on the 17th to leave him 2 behind.

==== The 72nd hole ====
As the final group, consisting of Rocca and 54-hole leader Michael Campbell, approached the last hole, Daly had completed his round and was in at 6 under par, a stroke clear of Rocca and two ahead of Campbell. Both golfers had a chance to tie Daly and force a playoff, with Rocca needing birdie and Campbell eagle to do so.

Rocca hit a shorter shot than Campbell, who nearly reached the green on his first shot, and played his second first. However, he misplayed the chip shot and only hit the ball a few yards, leaving him with an extremely long putt from an area of the hole referred to as the "Valley of Sin". Campbell failed to hole out on his second shot, thus leaving Rocca as the only one who could prevent the outright win for Daly.

As Daly and his wife Paulette watched on a monitor, believing that Rocca's mistake clinched the victory for him, Rocca lined up to attempt his putt for a tournament-tying birdie. Needing to make a sixty-five foot uphill putt with a sharp break to stay alive, Rocca managed to redeem himself for his error on the second shot as the putt rolled in to tie Daly at −6.

==== Playoff ====
For this 1995 edition, the four holes pre-selected for the aggregate score playoff were 1, 2, 17 (St. Andrew's infamous "Road Hole"), and 18. All were par four holes.

Daly emerged with the early lead after parring the first playoff hole while Rocca carded a bogey. He added a shot to his lead with a birdie on 2, leaving him at −1 to Rocca's +1 as the two men headed to the Road Hole for the third playoff hole.

Rocca hit his first shot onto the fairway while Daly ended up in the left-side rough. On the next shot, Rocca hit his ball into the Road Bunker, one of the deepest such hazards on the course. To further complicate matters, Rocca's shot was nestled deep in the sand near the front of the bunker and it took him three tries to finally extricate himself from the trap. Rocca two-putted from there to a triple-bogey 7, which all but ensured Daly would win the championship as he headed to the last hole with a five-shot lead after parring the Road Hole. Daly finished with another par at 18, giving him a four-hole total of 15, one-under-par. Rocca salvaged some pride with a birdie three for 19, three-over-par and four back.

Place	Player	Score	To par	Money (£)
1	(United States) John Daly	4-3-4-4=15	−1	125,000
2	(Italy) Costantino Rocca	5-4-7-3=19	+3	100,000

==== Scorecard ====
Hole	1	2	17	18
Par	4	4	4	4
(United States) Daly	E	−1	−1	−1
(Italy) Rocca	+1	+1	+4	+3

Cumulative playoff scores, relative to par

Eagle	Birdie	Bogey	Double bogey	Triple bogey +
