= 1996 European Tour =

Golf tour season

1996 European Tour season
- Duration: 25 January 1996 – 27 October 1996
- Number of official events: 38 (Note: A further two tournaments were scheduled but were cancelled.)
- Most wins: (Wales) Ian Woosnam (4)
- Order of Merit: (Scotland) Colin Montgomerie
- Golfer of the Year: (Scotland) Colin Montgomerie
- Sir Henry Cotton Rookie of the Year: (Denmark) Thomas Bjørn

The 1996 European Tour, titled as the 1996 PGA European Tour, was the 25th season of the European Tour, the main professional golf tour in Europe since its inaugural season in 1972.

== Changes for 1996 ==
The 1996 season saw co-sanctioning arrangements expand, with the PGA Tour of Australasia's Heineken Classic joining three Southern Africa Tour events on the schedule. The season was ultimately made up of 38 tournaments counting for the Order of Merit, and several non-counting "Approved Special Events".

Other changes from the previous season included the addition of the Heineken Classic, the Dimension Data Pro-Am and the Loch Lomond World Invitational; and the loss of the Turespaña Open De Canaria and the Open de Baleares. Soon after the schedule was announced, a third Southern Africa Tour event was added, the FNB Players Championship.

In January, the Jersey Open was moved onto the European Senior Tour schedule and the Open Mediterrania was replaced by the Catalan Open. In February, a new tournament in Spain, the Oki Pro-Am, was added opposite the Dunhill Cup. In March, the Slaley Hall Northumberland Challenge was added to the schedule, taking the dates vacated by the Jersey Open, opposite the U.S. Open.

== Schedule ==
The following table lists official events during the 1996 season.

Date	Tournament	Host country	Purse (£)	Winner (Note: The number in brackets after each winner's name is the number of European Tour events they had won up to and including that tournament. This information is only shown for European Tour members and are inclusive of the three United States-based major championships which were included on the schedule for the first time in 1998, with earlier editions having retrospectively been recognised as official tour wins.)	OWGR points	Other tours (Note: AFR − Southern Africa Tour; ANZ − PGA Tour of Australasia.)	Notes
28 Jan	Johnnie Walker Classic	Singapore	600,000	(Wales) Ian Woosnam (25)	42	ANZ	
4 Feb	Heineken Classic	Australia	A$800,000	(Wales) Ian Woosnam (26)	34	ANZ	New to European Tour
11 Feb	Dimension Data Pro-Am	South Africa	400,000	(Zimbabwe) Mark McNulty (13)	30	AFR	New Pro-Am tournament
18 Feb	Alfred Dunhill South African PGA Championship	South Africa	300,000	(Germany) Sven Strüver (1)	22	AFR	
25 Feb	FNB Players Championship	South Africa	400,000	(South Africa) Wayne Westner (2)	28	AFR	New to European Tour
~~3 Mar~~	Turespaña Open Mediterrania	Spain	–	Cancelled	–		
3 Mar	Catalan Open	Spain	300,000	(Scotland) Paul Lawrie (1)	20		
10 Mar	Moroccan Open	Morocco	350,000	(Sweden) Peter Hedblom (1)	26		
17 Mar	Dubai Desert Classic	UAE	US$1,000,000	(Scotland) Colin Montgomerie (10)	36		
24 Mar	Portuguese Open	Portugal	350,000	(Australia) Wayne Riley (2)	20		
31 Mar	Madeira Island Open	Portugal	300,000	(Sweden) Jarmo Sandelin (2)	20		
14 Apr	Masters Tournament	United States	US$2,500,000	(England) Nick Faldo (30)	100		Major championship (Note: Unofficial money event at the time, but retrospectively counted as an official win.)
21 Apr	Air France Cannes Open	France	400,000	(Scotland) Raymond Russell (1)	20		
28 Apr	Turespaña Masters	Spain	500,000	(Spain) Diego Borrego (1)	26		
5 May	Conte of Florence Italian Open	Italy	500,000	(England) Jim Payne (2)	24		
12 May	Peugeot Spanish Open	Spain	550,000	(Republic of Ireland) Pádraig Harrington (1)	32		
19 May	Benson & Hedges International Open	England	700,000	(Trinidad and Tobago) Stephen Ames (2)	44		
27 May	Volvo PGA Championship	England	1,000,000	(Italy) Costantino Rocca (3)	64		Flagship event
2 Jun	Deutsche Bank Open TPC of Europe	Germany	750,000	(New Zealand) Frank Nobilo (5)	38		
9 Jun	Alamo English Open	England	650,000	(Australia) Robert Allenby (2)	30		
~~16 Jun~~	Jersey Open	Jersey	–	Cancelled	–		
16 Jun	Slaley Hall Northumberland Challenge	England	300,000	(South Africa) Retief Goosen (1)	20		New tournament
16 Jun	U.S. Open	United States	US$2,400,000	(United States) Steve Jones (n/a)	100		Major championship
23 Jun	BMW International Open	Germany	500,000	(France) Marc Farry (1)	20		
30 Jun	Peugeot Open de France	France	600,000	(Australia) Robert Allenby (3)	40		
7 Jul	Murphy's Irish Open	Ireland	750,000	(Scotland) Colin Montgomerie (11)	40		
13 Jul	Scottish Open	Scotland	480,000	(Wales) Ian Woosnam (27)	42		
21 Jul	The Open Championship	England	1,500,000	(United States) Tom Lehman (n/a)	100		Major championship
28 Jul	Sun Microsystems Dutch Open	Netherlands	650,000	(Zimbabwe) Mark McNulty (14)	28		
4 Aug	Volvo Scandinavian Masters	Sweden	700,000	(England) Lee Westwood (1)	32		
11 Aug	Hohe Brücke Open	Austria	250,000	(Republic of Ireland) Paul McGinley (1)	20		
11 Aug	PGA Championship	United States	US$2,400,000	(United States) Mark Brooks (n/a)	100		Major championship
18 Aug	Chemapol Trophy Czech Open	Czech Republic	750,000	(England) Jonathan Lomas (1)	20		
25 Aug	Volvo German Open	Germany	700,000	(Wales) Ian Woosnam (28)	20		
31 Aug	One 2 One British Masters	England	700,000	(Australia) Robert Allenby (4)	36		
8 Sep	Canon European Masters	Switzerland	750,000	(Scotland) Colin Montgomerie (12)	32		
15 Sep	Trophée Lancôme	France	650,000	(Sweden) Jesper Parnevik (3)	38		
22 Sep	Loch Lomond World Invitational	Scotland	750,000	(Denmark) Thomas Bjørn (1)	40		
29 Sep	Smurfit European Open	Ireland	750,000	(Sweden) Per-Ulrik Johansson (3)	38		
6 Oct	Linde German Masters	Germany	650,000	(Northern Ireland) Darren Clarke (2)	40		
13 Oct	Oki Pro-Am	Spain	450,000	(United States) Tom Kite (n/a)	20		New tournament
27 Oct	Volvo Masters	Spain	900,000	(Zimbabwe) Mark McNulty (15)	40		Tour Championship

=== Unofficial events ===
The following events were sanctioned by the European Tour, but did not carry official money, nor were wins official.

Date	Tournament	Host country	Purse (£)	Winner(s)	OWGR points	Notes
13 Oct	Dunhill Cup	Scotland	1,000,000	Team USA	n/a	Team event
20 Oct	Toyota World Match Play Championship	England	650,000	(South Africa) Ernie Els	42	Limited-field event
20 Oct	Open Novotel Perrier	France	n/a	(England) Steven Bottomley and (England) Jonathan Lomas	n/a	Team event
3 Nov	Subaru Sarazen World Open	United States	US$1,900,000	(New Zealand) Frank Nobilo	40	
24 Nov	World Cup of Golf	South Africa	US$1,300,000	(South Africa) Ernie Els and (South Africa) Wayne Westner	n/a	Team event
24 Nov	World Cup of Golf Individual Trophy	South Africa	US$200,000	(South Africa) Ernie Els	n/a	
~~22 Dec~~	Johnnie Walker World Golf Championship	Jamaica	–	Cancelled	–	
5 Jan	Andersen Consulting World Championship of Golf	United States	US$3,650,000	(Australia) Greg Norman	58	Limited-field event

== Order of Merit ==
The Order of Merit was titled as the Volvo Order of Merit and was based on prize money won during the season, calculated in Pound sterling.

Position	Player	Prize money (£)
1	(Scotland) Colin Montgomerie	875,146
2	(Wales) Ian Woosnam	650,423
3	(Australia) Robert Allenby	532,143
4	(Italy) Costantino Rocca	482,585
5	(Zimbabwe) Mark McNulty	463,847
6	(England) Lee Westwood	428,693
7	(Scotland) Andrew Coltart	345,936
8	(Northern Ireland) Darren Clarke	329,795
9	(England) Paul Broadhurst	300,364
10	(Denmark) Thomas Bjørn	292,023

== Awards ==
Award	Winner	Ref.
Golfer of the Year	(Scotland) Colin Montgomerie	
Sir Henry Cotton Rookie of the Year	(Denmark) Thomas Bjørn	

== See also ==
- 1996 Challenge Tour
- 1996 European Seniors Tour
