= 1996 Volvo PGA Championship =

Tournament information
- Dates: 24–27 May 1996
- Location: Virginia Water, Surrey, England; 51.40°N 0.59°W
- Courses: Wentworth Club; West Course
- Tour: European Tour

Statistics
- Par: 72
- Field: 150 players, 71 after cut
- Cut: 144 (E)
- Prize fund: €1,008,970
- Winner's share: €233,324

Champion
- (Italy) Costantino Rocca
- 274 (−14)
- Location in England Location in Surrey

The 1996 Volvo PGA Championship was the 42nd edition of the Volvo PGA Championship, an annual professional golf tournament on the European Tour. It was held 24–27 May at the West Course of Wentworth Club in Virginia Water, Surrey, England, a suburb southwest of London.

Costantino Rocca won his first Volvo PGA Championship with a two stroke victory over Nick Faldo and Paul Lawrie.

== Round summaries ==
=== First round ===
Thursday, 24 May 1996

Place	Player	Score	To par
1	(England) Nick Faldo	67	−5
T2	(England) Paul Curry	68	−4
T2	(Zimbabwe) Mark McNulty	68	−4
T4	(Australia) Robert Allenby	69	−3
T4	(Spain) Ignacio Garrido	69	−3
T4	(Italy) Costantino Rocca	69	−3
T7	(Scotland) Gordon Brand Jnr	70	−2
T7	(England) Stuart Cage	70	−2
T7	(Spain) José María Cañizares	70	−2
T7	(Republic of Ireland) Eamonn Darcy	70	−2
T7	(Australia) Rodger Davis	70	−2
T7	(England) Paul Eales	70	−2
T7	(Sweden) Niclas Fasth	70	−2
T7	(Sweden) Joakim Haeggman	70	−2
T7	(Sweden) Jarmo Sandelin	70	−2
T7	(South Africa) Wayne Westner	70	−2

=== Second round ===
Friday, 25 May 1996

Place	Player	Score	To par
T1	(England) Nick Faldo	67-69=136	−8
T1	(Zimbabwe) Mark McNulty	68-68=136	−8
T1	(Italy) Costantino Rocca	69-67=136	−8
4	(Australia) Robert Allenby	69-68=137	−7
T5	(England) Roger Chapman	71-67=138	−6
T5	(Spain) Miguel Ángel Jiménez	72-66=138	−6
T5	(Scotland) Paul Lawrie	73-65=138	−6
T5	(Scotland) Gary Orr	71-67=138	−6
T9	(Spain) José María Cañizares	70-69=139	−5
T9	(England) Paul Curry	68-71=139	−5
T9	(Republic of Ireland) Eamonn Darcy	70-69=139	−5
T9	(England) Paul Eales	70-69=139	−5
T9	(Sweden) Niclas Fasth	70-69=139	−5
T9	(Sweden) Jarmo Sandelin	70-69=139	−5
T9	(France) Fabrice Tarnaud	72-67=139	−5

=== Third round ===
Saturday, 26 May 1996

Place	Player	Score	To par
T1	(Zimbabwe) Mark McNulty	68-68-69=205	−11
T1	(Italy) Costantino Rocca	69-67-69=205	−11
3	(Scotland) Paul Lawrie	73-65-68=206	−10
T4	(England) Paul Curry	68-71-69=208	−8
T4	(England) Nick Faldo	67-69-72=208	−8
T4	(Argentina) Eduardo Romero	71-69-68=208	−8
T7	(Spain) Miguel Ángel Jiménez	72-66-71=209	−7
T7	(France) Fabrice Tarnaud	72-67-70=209	−7
T9	(Republic of Ireland) Eamonn Darcy	70-69-71=210	−6
T9	(Wales) Mark Litton	74-68-68=210	−6
T9	(Scotland) Colin Montgomerie	73-68-69=210	−6
T9	(Scotland) Gary Orr	71-67-72=210	−6

=== Final round ===
Sunday, 27 May 1996

Place	Player	Score	To par	Money (€)
1	(Italy) Costantino Rocca	69-67-69-69=274	−14	233,324
T2	(England) Nick Faldo	67-69-72-68=276	−12	121,590
T2	(Scotland) Paul Lawrie	73-65-68-70=276	−12	121,590
T4	(Zimbabwe) Mark McNulty	68-68-69-73=278	−10	59,453
T4	(Sweden) Jarmo Sandelin	70-69-72-67=278	−10	59,453
T4	(England) Andrew Sherborne	74-69-70-65=278	−10	59,453
T7	(Scotland) Colin Montgomerie	73-68-69-69=279	−9	36,073
T7	(Scotland) Gary Orr	71-67-72-69=279	−9	36,073
T7	(Sweden) Patrik Sjöland	74-67-72-66=279	−9	36,073
10	(Argentina) Eduardo Romero	71-69-68-72=280	−8	28,000
