= 1994 World Cup of Golf =

Coordinates: 18°27′32″N 66°16′04″W

Tournament information
- Dates: November 10–13
- Location: Dorado, Puerto Rico
- Course: Hyatt Dorado Beach Resort
- Format: 72 holes stroke play combined score

Statistics
- Par: 72
- Field: 32 two-man teams
- Cut: None
- Prize fund: US$1.2 million
- Winner's share: $300,000 team $100,000 individual

Champion
- United States; Fred Couples & Davis Love III
- 536 (−40)

The 1994 World Cup of Golf took place November 10–13 at the Hyatt Dorado Beach Resort in Puerto Rico. It was the 40th World Cup. The tournament was a 72-hole stroke play team event with each team consisting of two players from a country. The combined score of each team determined the team results. Individuals also competed for the International Trophy. The winners share of the prize money was $300,000 going to the winning pair and $100,000 to the top individual. The United States team of Fred Couples and Davis Love won (for the third time in a row with the same players in the team) by 14 strokes over the Zimbabwe team of Mark McNulty and Tony Johnstone. Couples took the International Trophy by five strokes over Costantino Rocca of Italy.

== Teams ==
Country	Players
Argentina	Miguel Guzmán and Eduardo Romero
Australia	Mike Clayton and Steve Elkington
Brazil	Antonio Barcellos and Acacio Jorge Pedro
Canada	David Barr and Rick Gibson
Denmark	Jacob Rasmussen and Steen Tinning
England	Barry Lane and Mark Roe
Finland	Anssi Kankkonen and Mikael Piltz
France	Michel Besanceney and Jean van de Velde
Germany	Bernhard Langer and Sven Strüver
Hong Kong	Dominique Boulet and Richard Kan
Ireland	Darren Clarke and Paul McGinley
Italy	Costantino Rocca and Silvio Grappasonni
Jamaica	Ralph Mairs and Seymour Rose
Japan	Masayaki Kawamura and Toru Suzuki
Malaysia	Periasamy Gunasegaran and Marimuthu Ramayah
Mexico	Rafael Alarcón and Esteban Toledo
Netherlands	Joost Steenkammer and Chris van der Velde
New Zealand	Frank Nobilo and Greg Turner
Norway	Thomas Nielsen and Hans Strom-Olsen
Paraguay	Ángel Franco and Pedro Martínez
Puerto Rico	Manuel Camacho and Wilfredo Morales (a)
Scotland	Andrew Coltart and Gordon Brand Jnr
South Africa	Roger Wessels and Wayne Westner
South Korea	Choi Sang-ho and Han Young-kuen
Spain	Miguel Ángel Jiménez and José Rivero
Sweden	Joakim Haeggman and Jesper Parnevik
Switzerland	André Bossert and Marco Scopetta
Taiwan	Lu Chien-soon and Yu Chin-han
Thailand	Prayad Marksaeng and Boonchu Ruangkit
United States	Fred Couples and Davis Love III
Wales	Phillip Price and Ian Woosnam
Zimbabwe	Tony Johnstone and Mark McNulty

(a) denotes amateur

== Scores ==
Team

Place	Country	Score	To par	Money (US$) (per team)
1	United States	132-129-137-138=536	−40	300,000
2	Zimbabwe	135-139-133-143=550	−26	150,000
3	Sweden	140-134-140-137=551	−25	100,000
4	New Zealand	142-136-135-140=553	−23	75,000
T5	Japan	146-135-131-145=557	−19	45,666
T5	Paraguay	140-137-141-139=557	−19	45,666
T5	Scotland	144-137-141-135=557	−19	45,666
8	Germany	142-140-138-138=558	−18	24,000
T9	Australia	144-133-146-136=559	−17	18,000
T9	Italy	137-137-143-142=559	−17	18,000
T9	Malaysia	139-133-140-147=559	−17	18,000
12	Argentina	143-137-139-141=560	−16	14,000
13	Mexico	142-145-139-137=563	−13	12,000
14	Canada	143-134-142-146=565	−11	11,000
T15	England	141-141-140-146=568	−8	8,700
T15	France	147-138-143-140=568	−8	8,700
T15	Ireland	138-140-148-142=568	−8	8,700
T15	South Africa	140-140-147-141=568	−8	8,700
T19	Netherlands	144-138-144-144=570	−6	7,400
T19	South Korea	149-138-140-143=570	−6	7,400
T19	Thailand	139-142-142-147=570	−6	7,400
22	Brazil	146-138-143-150=577	+1	7,000
T23	Denmark	149-143-139-147=578	+2	6,700
T23	Finland	144-149-140-145=578	+2	6,700
25	Wales	150-141-138-150=579	+3	6,400
26	Taiwan	147-139-146-149=581	+5	6,200
27	Spain	146-141-148-148=583	+7	6,000
28	Switzerland	143-152-142-155=592	+16	5,800
29	Puerto Rico	146-147-150-152=595	+19	5,600
30	Hong Kong	157-150-144-147=598	+22	5,400
31	Norway	160-155-155-154=624	+48	5,200
DQ	Jamaica	146-DQ		5,000

Jamaica was disqualified because Seymour Rose signed an incorrect scorecard. His teammate Ralph Mairs completed the competition.

International Trophy

Place	Player	Country	Score	To par	Money (US$)
1	Fred Couples	United States	65-63-68-69=265	−23	100,000
2	Costantino Rocca	Italy	68-66-68-68=270	−18	50,000
3	Davis Love III	United States	67-66-69-69=271	−17	25,000
T4	Mark McNulty	Zimbabwe	68-67-67-70=272	−16	
T4	Frank Nobilo	New Zealand	70-66-67-69=272	−16	
6	Marimuthu Ramayah	Malaysia	66-64-69-74=273	−15	
T7	Steve Elkington	Australia	69-68-71-66=274	−14	
T7	Eduardo Romero	Argentina	72-66-66-70=274	−14	
9	Jesper Parnevik	Sweden	69-69-70-67=275	−13	
T10	Joakim Haeggman	Sweden	71-65-70-70=276	−12	
T10	Masayaki Kawamura	Japan	71-67-65-73=276	−12	
T10	Bernhard Langer	Germany	71-71-65-69=276	−12	
