= 1991 World Cup (men's golf) =

Coordinates: 42°14′N 12°17′E

Tournament information
- Dates: 31 October – 3 November
- Location: Rome, Italy
- Course: Le Querce Golf Club
- Format: 72 holes stroke play combined score

Statistics
- Par: 72
- Length: 7,030 yards (6,430 m)
- Field: 32 two-man teams
- Cut: None
- Prize fund: US$1.1 million
- Winner's share: $240,000 team $75,000 individual

Champion
- Sweden; Anders Forsbrand & Per-Ulrik Johansson
- 563 (−13)

The 1991 World Cup took place 31 October – 3 November 1991 at the Le Querce Golf Club, name later changed to Golf Nazionale, 30 miles north of Rome, Italy. It was the 37th World Cup event. The tournament was a 72-hole stroke play team event with 32 teams. Each team consisted of two players from a country. The combined score of each team determined the team results. The Swedish team of Anders Forsbrand and Per-Ulrik Johansson won by one stroke over the Wales team of Ian Woosnam and Phillip Price. The individual competition was won by Woosnam. This was the second team victory in professional golf within a month for Sweden, winning also the 1991 Dunhill Cup for three-men teams, were the Swedish team also included Forsbrand and Johansson. By the win, Sweden became the first nation to simultaneously hold the team titles in the Eisenhower Trophy, the Dunhill Cup and the World Cup in men's golf.

== Teams ==
Country	Players
Argentina	Rubén Alvarez and Eduardo Romero
Australia	Rodger Davis and Mike Harwood
Austria	Marcus Burger and Oswald Gartenmaier
Belgium	Olivier Buysse and Michel Van Meerbeek
Brazil	João Cortez and Rafael Navarro
Canada	Dave Barr and Dan Halldorson
Colombia	Eduardo Arévalo and Iván Rengifo
Denmark	Jacob Rasmussen and Anders Sørensen
England	Nick Faldo and Steven Richardson
Finland	Anssi Kankkonen and Mikael Piltz
France	Marc Farry and Jean van de Velde
Germany	Torsten Giedeon and Bernhard Langer
Ireland	Eamonn Darcy and Ronan Rafferty
Italy	Giuseppe Calì and Costantino Rocca
Japan	Satoshi Higashi and Nobuo Serizawa
Malaysia	Marimuthu Ramayah and Abdullah Mohd Yusof
Mexico	Rafael Alarcón and Carlos Espinoza
Netherlands	Willem Swart and Chris van der Velde
New Zealand	Frank Nobilo and Greg Turner
Norway	Per Haugsrud and Gard Midtwåge
Paraguay	Ángel Giménez and Jorge Murdoch
Philippines	A Fernando and Mario Siodina
Portugal	Daniel Silva and David Silva
Scotland	Colin Montgomerie and Sam Torrance
South Korea	Choi Sang-ho and Park Nam-sin
Spain	Seve Ballesteros and José Rivero
Sweden	Anders Forsbrand and Per-Ulrik Johansson
Switzerland	André Bossert and Paolo Quirici
United States	Wayne Levi and Joey Sindelar
Venezuela	Francisco Alvarado and Ramón Muñoz
Wales	Phillip Price and Ian Woosnam
Zimbabwe	William Koen and Timothy Price

== Scores ==
Team

Place	Country	Score	To par	Money (US$) (per team)
1	Sweden	142-148-134-139=563	−13	240,000
2	Wales	142-144-139-139=564	−12	120,000
3	Scotland	144-141-140-142=567	−9	88,000
T4	England	137-146-148-139=570	−6	52,000
T4	Germany	138-144-149-139=570	−6	52,000
T6	New Zealand	146-140-141-144=571	−5	35,000
T6	Spain	141-138-143-149=571	−5	35,000
T8	Canada	144-147-139-144=574	−2	19,333
T8	Ireland	147-139-146-142=574	−2	19,333
T8	Japan	142-145-145-142=574	−2	19,333
11	Switzerland	143-146-140-146=575	−1	
T12	Australia	150-145-141-142=578	+2	
T12	Italy	150-143-141-144=578	+2	
T12	United States	147-143-142-146=578	+2	
15	France	146-147-143-143=579	+3	
16	Norway	148-144-147-143=582	+6	
17	Mexico	150-139-149-145=583	+7	
T18	Denmark	142-151-142-149=584	+8	
T18	South Korea	143-155-140-146=584	+8	
T20	Argentina	144-142-151-148=585	+9	
T20	Netherlands	147-144-145-149=585	+9	
22	Portugal	158-143-147-144=592	+16	
23	Philippines	150-147-147-150=594	+18	
24	Finland	152-147-149-147=595	+19	
25	Zimbabwe	154-149-146-154=603	+27	
26	Colombia	154-151-149-152=606	+30	
27	Brazil	164-146-144-154=608	+32	
28	Paraguay	151-151-154-155=611	+35	
29	Malaysia	155-149-158-153=615	+39	
30	Austria	156-155-156-151=618	+42	
31	Venezuela	159-158-146-163=626	+50	
32	Belgium	165-163-154-165=647	+71	

International Trophy

Place	Player	Country	Score	To par	Money (US$)
1	Ian Woosnam	Wales	70-69-67-67=273	−15	75,000
2	Bernhard Langer	Germany	69-69-71-67=276	−12	50,000
3	Anders Forsbrand	Sweden	73-73-65-68=279	−9	40,000
T4	Seve Ballesteros	Spain	68-69-71-72=280	−8	25,000
T4	André Bossert	Switzerland	71-71-70-68=280	−8	25,000
6	Sam Torrance	Scotland	71-71-66-73=281	−7	15,000
7	Anders Sørensen	Denmark	69-73-69-72=283	−5	
T8	Dave Barr	Canada	72-72-70-70=284	−4	
T8	Rodger Davis	Australia	74-70-69-71=284	−4	
T8	Satoshi Higashi	Japan	73-71-73-67=284	−4	
T8	Per-Ulrik Johansson	Sweden	69-75-69-71=284	−4	
T8	Steven Richardson	England	69-73-74-68=284	−4	
