= Per-Ulrik Johansson =

Swedish professional golfer (born 1966)

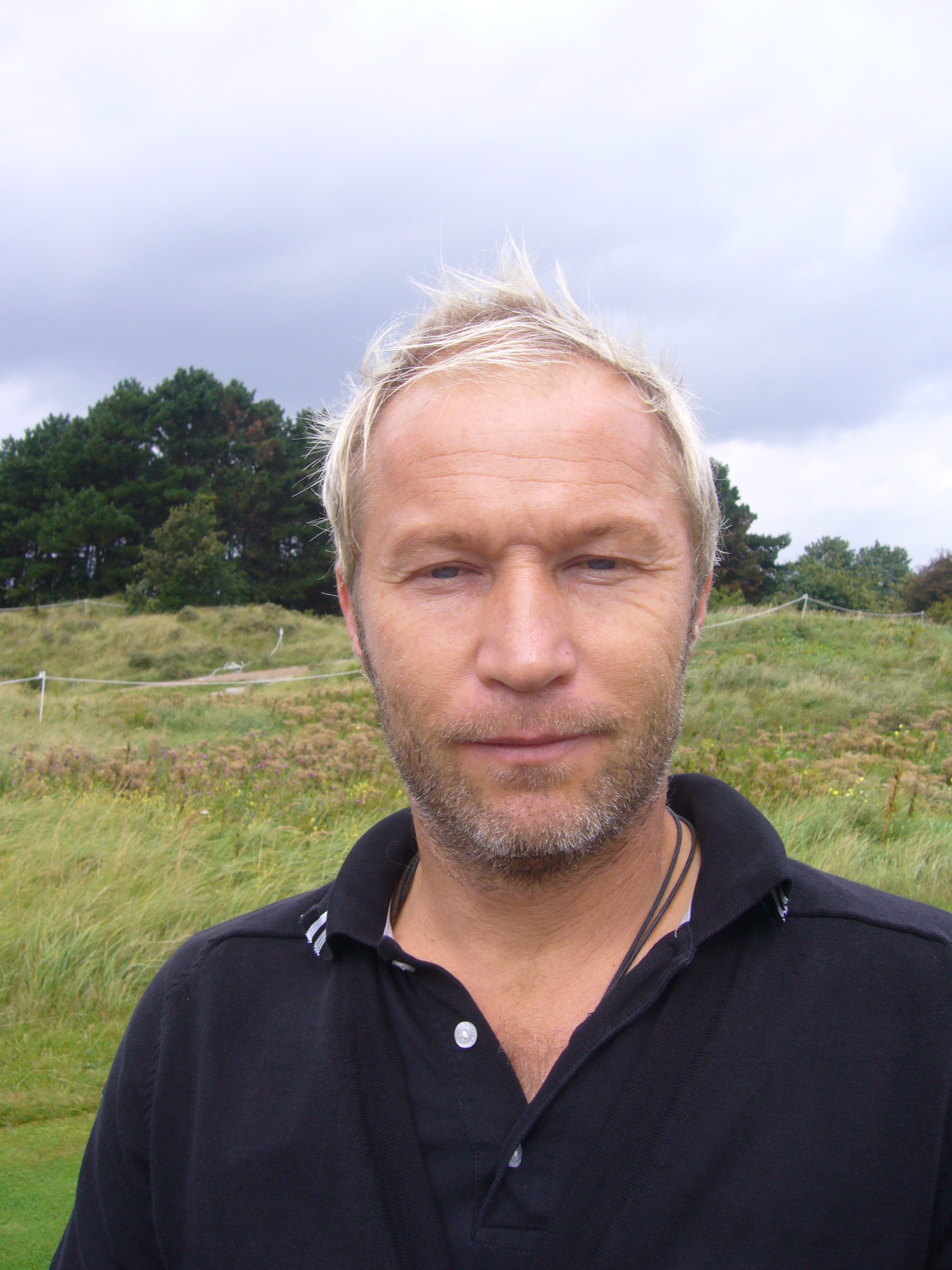
- Johansson in August 2019

Personal information
- Full name: Per-Ulrik Johansson
- Nickname: Puh
- Nationality: Sweden
- Born: 6 December 1966 (age 59) Uppsala, Sweden
- Height: 1.73 m (5 ft 8 in)
- Spouse: Jill (m. 2002)
- Children: 3

Career
- Sport: Golf
- College: Arizona State University
- Turned professional: 1990
- Former tours: European Tour; PGA Tour
- Professional wins: 7
- Highest ranking: 40 (24 August 1997)

Number of wins by tour
- European Tour: 6
- Other: 1

Best results in major championships
- Masters Tournament: T12: 1997, 1998
- PGA Championship: T8: 1996
- U.S. Open: T25: 1998
- The Open Championship: T15: 1995

Achievements and awards
- Sir Henry Cotton Rookie of the Year: 1991
- Swedish Golfer of the Year: 1991

Per-Ulrik Johansson (born 6 December 1966) is a Swedish professional golfer, who won six times on the European Tour and played in two winning European Ryder Cup teams. In 1991, his first year on the tour, he was named the Sir Henry Cotton Rookie of the Year.

== Early life ==
Johansson grew up in Västervik in Småland, Sweden, and was a promising ice hockey player at 14 years of age, when he decided to give priority to golf training instead. He won the unofficial Swedish Youth Championship, the Colgate Cup, at his age level and represented his country on boys and youth level.

== Amateur career ==
In 1983, 15 years old, Johansson was a member of the Swedish team winning the European Boys' Team Championship, for players up to 18 years of age, at Helsinki Golf Club, Finland.

In August 1986, Johansson won the Leven Gold medal at Leven Links, Scotland, with a 72-hole score of 9-under-par 275, 2 strokes ahead on Colin Montgomerie.

Like many European golfers, Johansson took a golf scholarship in the United States as sports scholarships did not exist in Europe. He attended Arizona State University in 1986 and was a member of the same 1990 NCAA Championship winning team as Phil Mickelson.

== Professional career ==
Johansson turned professional in late 1990 and won a European Tour card on his first visit to Qualifying School. His first year on tour, he was the 1991 Sir Henry Cotton Rookie of the Year.

Within the span of a month, he was a member of winning Swedish teams at the 1991 Dunhill Cup, together with Anders Forsbrand and Mats Lanner, and the 1991 World Cup, together with Anders Forsbrand. Together with Forsbrand, Johansson was chosen to defend the 1991 World Cup title, from Rome, Italy for Sweden, in 1992 in Madrid, Spain, but the Swedish team finished second, one shot behind the United States team of Fred Couples and Davis Love III.

In his first ten seasons on the European Tour, Johansson made the top 20 of the Order of Merit four times, with a best ranking of 11th in 1997. He won five European Tour events between 1991 and 1997 and has featured in the top 50 of the Official World Golf Ranking.

Johansson was the first Swede to play in the Ryder Cup twice (1995 and 1997); he finished on the winning side both times. In his Sunday singles match in 1995, he played collegiate teammate Phil Mickelson.

In 2001, Johansson moved to the United States to play on the PGA Tour, after successfully negotiating the 2000 Qualifying School. He was a member of the PGA Tour for four seasons, but failed to make the same impact as he had in Europe. His best PGA Tour finish was tied for sixth, which by coincidence he achieved once in each of those four seasons. In 2001 and 2002 he only just held onto his card via his money list placing. In 2003 he failed to do so, but he made a successful return trip to the PGA Tour Qualifying Tournament. In 2004 he lost six months to injury and ended the year with a failed trip to the Qualifying Tournament. In 2005 and 2006 he played on the Nationwide Tour with appearances on the PGA Tour and the European Tour without recovering his form.

In 2007, Johansson had to rely on wild card entries to play on the European Tour. Ten years after his last win, a six shot victory, with a new tournament record 23 under par, at the Russian Open, secured his playing rights until 2009.

He retired in August 2009 because of injury and came back to play three tournaments, where he was invited, on the European Tour in 2011, before he finally retired.

== Awards and honors ==
- In 1991, Johansson's earned the Swedish Golfer of the Year award.
- In 1992, he earned Elite Sign No. 92 by the Swedish Golf Federation, on the basis of national team appearances and national championship performances.
- In 1992, the three teammates at the 1991 Dunhill Cup victory, Johansson, Mats Lanner and Anders Forsbrand was each, by the Swedish Golf Federation, awarded the Golden Club, the highest award for contributions to Swedish golf, as the 11th, 12th and 13th recipients.
- In 1998, Johansson was awarded honorary membership of the PGA of Sweden.

== Personal life ==
Johansson is married to Jill, a sister of Jesper Parnevik, and they have three daughters, Stella, Nova and Luna.

They formerly lived in West Palm Beach, Florida, United States, but when Johansson retired from his PGA Tour career, they moved back to Sweden, to live in Åkersberga outside Stockholm. Johansson left tournament play to work, first at Bro Hof Slott Golf Club, then at Ullna Golf Club, north of Stockholm, and since 2015 as CEO at Wermdö Golf & Country Club, east of Stockholm.

== Amateur wins ==
- 1986 Leven Gold Medal (Leven Links, Scotland)
- 1989 Nordic Amateur Championship

== Professional wins (7) ==
=== European Tour wins (6) ===
No.	Date	Tournament	Winning score	Margin of victory	Runner-up
1	16 Jun 1991	Renault Belgian Open	−12 (68-70-70-68=276)	Playoff	(England) Paul Broadhurst
2	23 Oct 1994	Chemapol Trophy Czech Open	−11 (61-56-54-66=237)*	3 strokes	(Sweden) Klas Eriksson
3	29 Sep 1996	Smurfit European Open	−11 (71-70-66-70=277)	1 stroke	(Italy) Costantino Rocca
4	18 May 1997	Alamo English Open	−19 (70-68-64-67=269)	2 strokes	(Sweden) Dennis Edlund
5	24 Aug 1997	Smurfit European Open (2)	−21 (68-64-66-69=267)	6 strokes	(England) Peter Baker
6	5 Aug 2007	Russian Open Golf Championship	−23 (69-62-67-67=265)	6 strokes	(Netherlands) Robert-Jan Derksen

*Note: The 1994 Chemapol Trophy Czech Open was shortened to 66 holes due to frost.

European Tour playoff record (1–0)

No.	Year	Tournament	Opponent	Result
1	1991	Renault Belgian Open	(England) Paul Broadhurst	Won with par on first extra hole

=== Other wins (1) ===
No.	Date	Tournament	Winning score	Margin of victory	Runners-up
1	3 Nov 1991	World Cup (with (Sweden) Anders Forsbrand)	−13 (142-148-134-139=563)	1 stroke	Wales − Phillip Price and Ian Woosnam

== Results in major championships ==
Tournament	1992	1993	1994	1995	1996	1997	1998	1999	2000	2001	2002
Masters Tournament						T12	T12	T24			
U.S. Open				CUT			T25	CUT			CUT
The Open Championship	T68	CUT	T60	T15	CUT	T66	CUT	CUT	T64		
PGA Championship				T58	T8	T67	T23	CUT			

Top 10
Did not play

CUT = missed the half-way cut
"T" = tied

=== Summary ===
Tournament	Wins	2nd	3rd	Top-5	Top-10	Top-25	Events	Cuts made
Masters Tournament	0	0	0	0	0	3	3	3
U.S. Open	0	0	0	0	0	1	4	1
The Open Championship	0	0	0	0	0	1	9	5
PGA Championship	0	0	0	0	1	2	5	4
Totals	0	0	0	0	1	7	21	13

- Most consecutive cuts made – 6 (1996 PGA – 1998 U.S. Open)
- Longest streak of top-10s – 1

== Results in The Players Championship ==
Tournament	1998	1999	2000	2001	2002	2003
The Players Championship	T54				CUT	T48

Did not play

CUT = missed the halfway cut
"T" indicates a tie for a place

== Results in World Golf Championships ==
Tournament	2001
Match Play	R32
Championship	NT^{1}
Invitational	

^{1}Cancelled due to 9/11

Did not play

QF, R16, R32, R64 = Round in which player lost in match play
NT = No tournament

== Team appearances ==
Amateur

- European Boys' Team Championship (representing Sweden): 1983 (winners), 1984
- European Amateur Team Championship (representing Sweden): 1987, 1989
- EGA Trophy (representing the Continent of Europe): 1987 (winners)

Professional

- Ryder Cup (representing Europe): 1995 (winners), 1997 (winners)
- Alfred Dunhill Cup (representing Sweden): 1991 (winners), 1992, 1995, 1997, 1998, 2000
- World Cup (representing Sweden): 1991 (winners), 1992, 1997

== See also ==
- 2000 PGA Tour Qualifying School graduates
