= André Bossert =

Swiss professional golfer

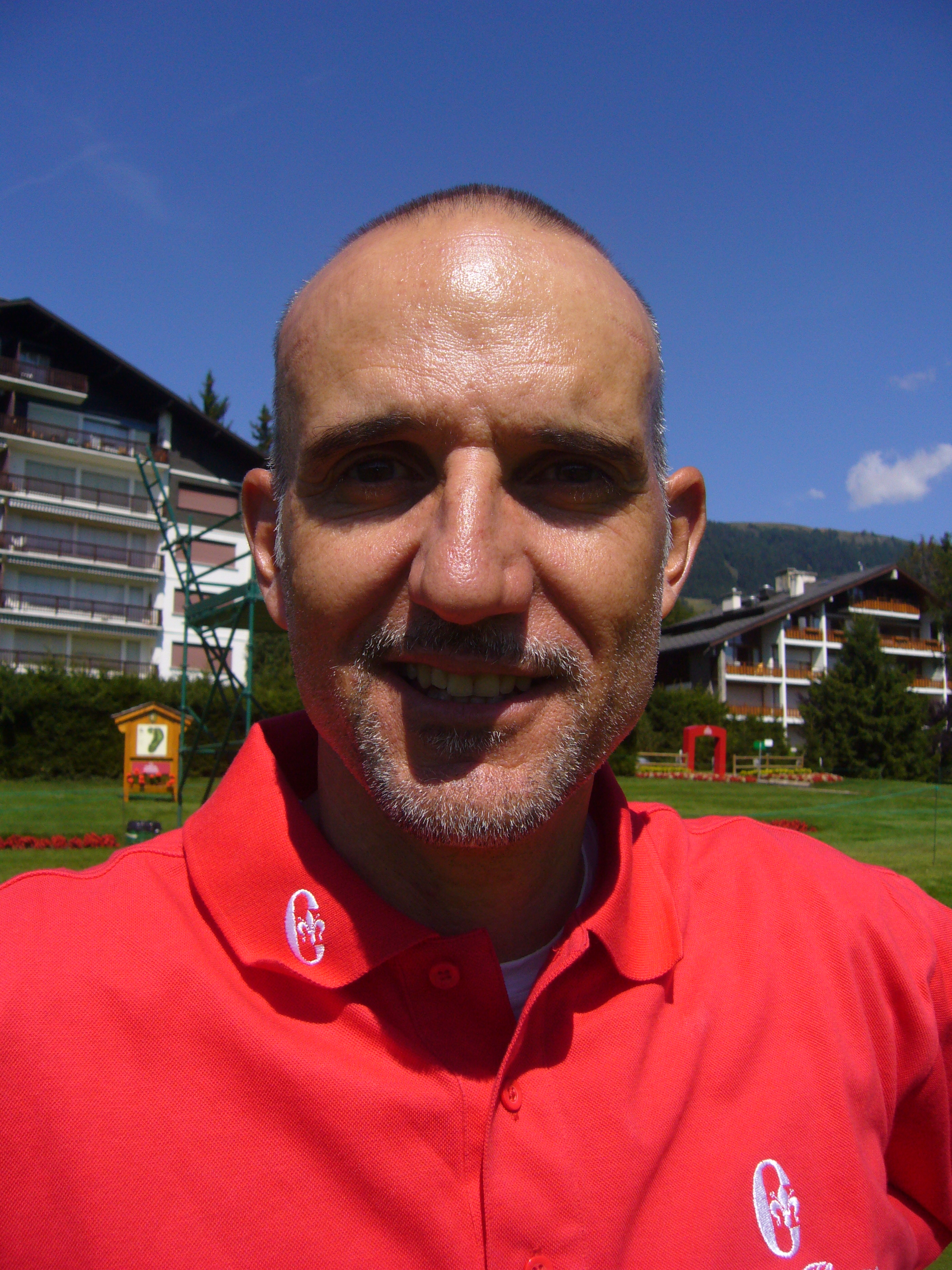

Personal information
- Full name: André Robert Bossert
- Nickname: Bossy
- Nationality: Switzerland
- Born: 14 November 1963 (age 62) Johannesburg, South Africa
- Height: 1.88 m (6 ft 2 in)
- Weight: 78 kg (172 lb; 12.3 st)
- Spouse: Bettina (m. 2004)
- Children: 1

Career
- Sport: Golf
- College: Oral Roberts University; University of Tulsa
- Turned professional: 1989
- Current tour: European Senior Tour
- Former tours: European Tour; Sunshine Tour; Challenge Tour; Champions Tour
- Professional wins: 10

Number of wins by tour
- European Tour: 1
- Challenge Tour: 3
- European Senior Tour: 1
- Other: 5

Best results in major championships
- Masters Tournament: DNP
- PGA Championship: DNP
- U.S. Open: DNP
- The Open Championship: CUT: 2005

André Robert Bossert (born 14 November 1963) is a Swiss professional golfer.

== Early life and education ==
Bossert was born to Swiss parents in Johannesburg, South Africa, and played college golf at Oral Roberts University and University of Tulsa in the United States.

As an amateur, he represented Switzerland at the 1988 Eisenhower Trophy in Stockholm, Sweden, were his team finished twelwth.

== Professional career ==
Bossert turned professional in 1989 and has played on the European Tour, the Southern Africa-based Sunshine Tour and the second tier European Challenge Tour. The main highlight of his career was his sole European Tour victory, which came in 1995 at the Air France Cannes Open. He was the first Swiss winner on the European Tour. He has also won the 1990 Neuchâtel Open and the 1992 Kenya Open on the Challenge Tour. He has represented his country in international team competitions several times as a professional as well as an amateur..

== Professional wins (10) ==
=== European Tour wins (1) ===
No.	Date	Tournament	Winning score	Margin of victory	Runners-up
1	23 Apr 1995	Air France Cannes Open	−10 (65-67=132) (Note: Shortened to 36 holes due to weather.)	2 strokes	(Norway) Øyvind Rojahn, (France) Jean van de Velde

=== Challenge Tour wins (3) ===
No.	Date	Tournament	Winning score	Margin of victory	Runner-up
1	8 Jul 1990	Neuchâtel Open	−5 (74-70-64=208)	3 strokes	(England) Nick Godin
2	26 Jan 1992	Standard Chartered Kenya Open	−12 (67-68-69-67=272)	1 stroke	(Scotland) Craig Maltman
3	20 Jul 2008	MAN NÖ Open	−15 (65-65-69-66=265)	Playoff	(Austria) Markus Brier

Challenge Tour playoff record (1–1)

No.	Year	Tournament	Opponent(s)	Result
1	2003	Tessali-Metaponto Open di Puglia e Basilicata	(England) Martin LeMesurier, (England) Sam Walker	LeMesurier won with par on second extra hole Walker eliminated by birdie on first hole
2	2008	MAN NÖ Open	(Austria) Markus Brier	Won with par on first extra hole

=== Other wins (5) ===
- 1991 Swiss Omnium
- 2000 Swiss PGA Championship
- 2001 Swiss Doubles Championship
- 2002 Davidoff Nations Cup (with Marc Chatelain)
- 2007 Swiss Omnium

=== European Senior Tour wins (1) ===
No.	Date	Tournament	Winning score	Margin of victory	Runners-up
1	4 Sep 2016	Travis Perkins Masters	−8 (69-70-69=208)	4 strokes	(England) Philip Golding, (Wales) Ian Woosnam

== Results in major championships ==
Tournament	2005
The Open Championship	CUT

CUT = missed the halfway cut
Note: Bossert only played in The Open Championship.

== Team appearances ==
Amateur

- Eisenhower Trophy (representing Switzerland): 1988
- European Amateur Team Championship (representing Switzerland): 1989

Professional

- World Cup (representing Switzerland): 1990, 1991, 1992, 1994, 1995, 1996, 2002
- Dunhill Cup (representing Switzerland): 1991
