= 1995 Ryder Cup =

International golf match play event in New York state

31st Ryder Cup Matches
- Dates: September 22–24, 1995
- Venue: Oak Hill Country Club; East Course
- Location: Pittsford, New York, USA
- Captains: Lanny Wadkins (USA); Bernard Gallacher (Europe)
(United States)	13 1/2	14 1/2	(Europe)
- Europe wins the Ryder Cup

Location map
- Location within New York

The 31st Ryder Cup Matches were held September 22–24, 1995 at the East Course of Oak Hill Country Club in Pittsford, New York, a suburb southeast of Rochester.

The European team won the competition by a margin of 14 1/2 to 13 1/2 points to win back the Cup. At the time, this was only Europe's second victory on U.S. soil, the first was eight years earlier in 1987. This was the third consecutive Ryder Cup where Bernard Gallacher captained the European side and the only victory.

Going into the Sunday singles matches, Europe trailed by 2 points, 7 to 9. For the first time, they overcame a deficit entering the singles to win the Cup. The unheralded Irish rookie Philip Walton secured victory for Europe by defeating Jay Haas 1 up. The next Ryder Cup where Europe won from behind was 2012, also held in the U.S.

== Format ==
The Ryder Cup is a match play event, with each match worth one point. The competition format used in 1995 was as follows:

- Day 1 (Friday) — 4 foursome (alternate shot) matches in a morning session and 4 four-ball (better ball) matches in an afternoon session
- Day 2 (Saturday) — 4 foursome matches in a morning session and 4 four-ball matches in an afternoon session
- Day 3 (Sunday) — 12 singles matches

With a total of 28 points, 14 1/2 points were required to win the Cup, and 14 points were required for the defending champion to retain the Cup. All matches were played to a maximum of 18 holes.

== Teams ==
Team USA
Name	Age	Points rank	World ranking	Previous Ryder Cups	Matches	W–L–H	Winning percentage
Lanny Wadkins	45	Non-playing captain
Corey Pavin	35	1	7	2	8	4–4–0	50.00
Tom Lehman	36	2	12	0	Rookie
Davis Love III	31	3	19	1	4	2–2–0	50.00
Phil Mickelson	25	4	24	0	Rookie
Jay Haas	41	5	29	1	4	2–1–1	62.50
Jeff Maggert	31	6	30	0	Rookie
Loren Roberts	40	7	20	0	Rookie
Ben Crenshaw	43	8	25	3	9	3–5–1	38.89
Peter Jacobsen	41	9	21	1	3	1–2–0	33.33
Brad Faxon	34	10	31	0	Rookie
Curtis Strange	40	23	61	4	17	6–9–2	41.18
Fred Couples	35	34	8	3	12	3–6–3	37.50

Captains picks are shown in yellow. The world rankings and records are at the start of the 1995 Ryder Cup.

Two changes were made to the selection process for the European team. For the first time prize money in the three Major Championships played in the USA was included. This change was meant to provide more opportunities for the leading players to gain automatic qualification. The number of captain's picks was, however, reduced from three to two. The qualifying period remained the same, starting with the Canon European Masters in Switzerland at the beginning of September 1994 and ending with the Volvo German Open on August 27, the remaining two team members being chosen soon afterwards by the team captain. In the final event Ian Woosnam had a chance to overtake Philip Walton but a poor last round left him out of the automatic qualifying places. Gallacher announced his picks on August 28. He had already indicated that he would choose Nick Faldo as one of his choices. José María Olazábal was chosen as the second selection. Olazábal had finished in the top 10 in two recent PGA Tour events but had been troubled with a foot injury during the season. Olazábal continued to be troubled with his foot injury and withdrew from the team on September 11. Gallacher immediately chose Ian Woosnam as his replacement. Olazábal had finished 12th in the points list and had a world ranking of 10 at the time of the Ryder Cup.

Team Europe
Name	Age	Points rank	World ranking	Previous Ryder Cups	Matches	W–L–H	Winning percentage
(Scotland) Bernard Gallacher	46	Non-playing captain
(Scotland) Colin Montgomerie	32	1	6	2	8	4–2–2	62.50
(Germany) Bernhard Langer	38	2	5	7	29	13–11–5	53.45
(Scotland) Sam Torrance	42	3	17	7	23	4–13–6	30.43
(Italy) Costantino Rocca	38	4	28	1	2	0–2–0	0.00
(Spain) Seve Ballesteros	38	5	15	7	34	19–10–5	63.24
(England) David Gilford	30	6	58	1	3	0–2–1	16.67
(England) Mark James	41	7	57	6	22	7–14–1	34.09
(England) Howard Clark	41	8	73	5	13	6–6–1	50.00
(Sweden) Per-Ulrik Johansson	28	9	70	0	Rookie
(Republic of Ireland) Philip Walton	33	10	108	0	Rookie
(England) Nick Faldo	38	17	4	9	36	19–13–4	58.33
(Wales) Ian Woosnam	37	13	26	6	26	12–10–4	53.85

Captains picks are shown in yellow. The world rankings and records are at the start of the 1995 Ryder Cup.

== Friday's matches ==
=== Morning foursomes ===
	Results
Faldo/Montgomerie	(United States) 1 up	Pavin/Lehman
Torrance/Rocca	(Europe) 3 & 2	Haas/Couples
Clark/James	(United States) 4 & 3	Love III/Maggert
Langer/Johansson	(Europe) 1 up	Crenshaw/Strange
2	Session	2
2	Overall	2

=== Afternoon four-ball ===
	Results
Gilford/Ballesteros	(Europe) 4 & 3	Faxon/Jacobsen
Torrance/Rocca	(United States) 6 & 5	Maggert/Roberts
Faldo/Montgomerie	(United States) 3 & 2	Couples/Love III
Langer/Johansson	(United States) 6 & 4	Pavin/Mickelson
1	Session	3
3	Overall	5

== Saturday's matches ==
=== Morning foursomes ===
	Results
Faldo/Montgomerie	(Europe) 4 & 2	Strange/Haas
Torrance/Rocca	(Europe) 6 & 5	Love III/Maggert
Woosnam/Walton	(United States) 1 up	Roberts/Jacobsen
Langer/Gilford	(Europe) 4 & 3	Pavin/Lehman
3	Session	1
6	Overall	6

=== Afternoon four-ball ===
	Results
Torrance/Montgomerie	(United States) 4 & 2	Faxon/Couples
Woosnam/Rocca	(Europe) 3 & 2	Love III/Crenshaw
Ballesteros/Gilford	(United States) 3 & 2	Haas/Mickelson
Faldo/Langer	(United States) 1 up	Pavin/Roberts
1	Session	3
7	Overall	9

== Sunday's singles matches ==
	Results
Seve Ballesteros	(United States) 4 & 3	Tom Lehman
Howard Clark	(Europe) 1 up	Peter Jacobsen
Mark James	(Europe) 4 & 3	Jeff Maggert
Ian Woosnam	halved	Fred Couples
Costantino Rocca	(United States) 3 & 2	Davis Love III
David Gilford	(Europe) 1 up	Brad Faxon
Colin Montgomerie	(Europe) 3 & 1	Ben Crenshaw
Nick Faldo	(Europe) 1 up	Curtis Strange
Sam Torrance	(Europe) 2 & 1	Loren Roberts
Bernhard Langer	(United States) 3 & 2	Corey Pavin
Philip Walton	(Europe) 1 up	Jay Haas
Per-Ulrik Johansson	(United States) 2 & 1	Phil Mickelson
7 1/2	Session	4 1/2
14 1/2	Overall	13 1/2

== Individual player records ==
Each entry refers to the win–loss–half record of the player.

=== United States ===
Player	Points	Overall	Singles	Foursomes	Fourballs
Fred Couples	2.5	2–1–1	0–0–1	0–1–0	2–0–0
Ben Crenshaw	0	0–3–0	0–1–0	0–1–0	0–1–0
Brad Faxon	1	1–2–0	0–1–0	0–0–0	1–1–0
Jay Haas	1	1–3–0	0–1–0	0–2–0	1–0–0
Peter Jacobsen	1	1–2–0	0–1–0	1–0–0	0–1–0
Tom Lehman	2	2–1–0	1–0–0	1–1–0	0–0–0
Davis Love III	3	3–2–0	1–0–0	1–1–0	1–1–0
Jeff Maggert	2	2–2–0	0–1–0	1–1–0	1–0–0
Phil Mickelson	3	3–0–0	1–0–0	0–0–0	2–0–0
Corey Pavin	4	4–1–0	1–0–0	1–1–0	2–0–0
Loren Roberts	3	3–1–0	0–1–0	1–0–0	2–0–0
Curtis Strange	0	0–3–0	0–1–0	0–2–0	0–0–0

=== Europe ===
Player	Points	Overall	Singles	Foursomes	Fourballs
Seve Ballesteros	1	1–2–0	0–1–0	0–0–0	1–1–0
Howard Clark	1	1–1–0	1–0–0	0–1–0	0–0–0
Nick Faldo	2	2–3–0	1–0–0	1–1–0	0–2–0
David Gilford	3	3–1–0	1–0–0	1–0–0	1–1–0
Mark James	1	1–1–0	1–0–0	0–1–0	0–0–0
Per-Ulrik Johansson	1	1–2–0	0–1–0	1–0–0	0–1–0
Bernhard Langer	2	2–3–0	0–1–0	2–0–0	0–2–0
Colin Montgomerie	2	2–3–0	1–0–0	1–1–0	0–2–0
Costantino Rocca	3	3–2–0	0–1–0	2–0–0	1–1–0
Sam Torrance	3	3–2–0	1–0–0	2–0–0	0–2–0
Philip Walton	1	1–1–0	1–0–0	0–1–0	0–0–0
Ian Woosnam	1.5	1–1–1	0–0–1	0–1–0	1–0–0
