= 1997 Ryder Cup =

32nd edition; golf tournament in Spain

32nd Ryder Cup Matches
- Dates: 26–28 September 1997
- Venue: Valderrama Golf Club
- Location: Sotogrande, Spain
- Captains: Seve Ballesteros (Europe); Tom Kite (USA)
(Europe)	14 1/2	13 1/2	(United States)
- Europe wins the Ryder Cup

Location map
- Location within Spain

The 32nd Ryder Cup Matches were held at the Valderrama Golf Club in Sotogrande, Spain, marking the first time the event was contested in continental Europe. The European team won the competition by a margin of 14 1/2 to 13 1/2 and retained the Ryder Cup.

The Europeans held a 10 1/2–5 1/2 lead heading into the final day, but the Americans mounted a comeback by winning the singles matches 8–4 but fell just short. Colin Montgomerie halved the final match with Scott Hoch (conceding a 15-foot (4.6 m) par putt on the final hole) to seal the outright victory for the Europeans.

This was the first of seven consecutive victories at home by Europe, a streak that remains intact through 2023.

== Format ==
The Ryder Cup is a match play event, with each match worth one point. The competition format used in 1997 was as follows:

- Day 1 (Friday) – 4 fourball (better ball) matches in a morning session and 4 foursome (alternate shot) matches in an afternoon session
- Day 2 (Saturday) – 4 fourball matches in a morning session and 4 foursome matches in an afternoon session
- Day 3 (Sunday) – 12 singles matches

With a total of 28 points, 14 1/2 points were required to win the Cup, and 14 points were required for the defending champion to retain the Cup. All matches were played to a maximum of 18 holes.

== Teams ==
The selection process for the European team remained largely unchanged from that used in 1995 with two captain's picks. If captain Ballesteros qualified automatically, he had the choice of standing down and selecting a third player. The qualifying period remained the same, starting with the Canon European Masters in Switzerland at the beginning of September 1996 and ending with the BMW International Open on 31 August, the remaining two team members being chosen soon afterwards by the team captain. Prior to the final event Miguel Ángel Martín was in 10th place in the points list. He had, however, not played since The Open Championship because of a wrist injury. In the final event both José María Olazábal and Pádraig Harrington had chances to overtake Martin but neither succeeded. Olazábal finished 11th in the final points list with Harrington 12th. Because of uncertainty about Martin's fitness, the announcement of the two captain's picks, which was to have been immediately after the BMW International Open, was cancelled. On the Tuesday Martin was given an ultimatum that he was required to play 18 holes the following day to demonstrate that he would be fit to play in the Ryder Cup. Martin refused and was replaced by Olazábal, who had finished in the next qualifying place. Ballesteros announced his wildcards on the Thursday, choosing Nick Faldo and Jesper Parnevik. Miguel Ángel Martín had a world ranking of 79 at the time of the Ryder Cup.

Team Europe
Name	Age	Points rank	World ranking	Previous Ryder Cups	Matches	W–L–H	Winning percentage
(Spain) Seve Ballesteros	40	Non-playing captain
(Scotland) Colin Montgomerie	34	1	5	3	13	6–5–2	53.85
(Northern Ireland) Darren Clarke	29	2	33	0	Rookie
(Germany) Bernhard Langer	40	3	20	8	34	15–14–5	51.47
(Wales) Ian Woosnam	39	4	25	7	29	13–11–5	53.45
(Sweden) Per-Ulrik Johansson	30	5	42	1	3	1–2–0	33.33
(England) Lee Westwood	24	6	32	0	Rookie
(Spain) Ignacio Garrido	25	7	78	0	Rookie
(Denmark) Thomas Bjørn	26	8	73	0	Rookie
(Italy) Costantino Rocca	40	9	43	2	7	3–4–0	42.86
(Spain) José María Olazábal	31	11	57	4	20	12–6–2	65.00
(England) Nick Faldo	40	27	15	10	41	21–16–4	56.10
(Sweden) Jesper Parnevik	32	–	18	0	Rookie

Captains picks are shown in yellow; the world rankings and records are at the start of the 1997 Ryder Cup.

Team USA
Name	Age	Points rank	World ranking	Previous Ryder Cups	Matches	W–L–H	Winning percentage
Tom Kite	47	Non-playing captain
Tiger Woods	21	1	2	0	Rookie
Justin Leonard	25	2	11	0	Rookie
Tom Lehman	38	3	6	1	3	2–1–0	66.67
Davis Love III	33	4	10	2	9	5–4–0	55.56
Jim Furyk	27	5	21	0	Rookie
Phil Mickelson	27	6	8	1	3	3–0–0	100.00
Jeff Maggert	33	7	28	1	4	2–2–0	50.00
Mark O'Meara	40	8	9	3	8	2–5–1	31.25
Scott Hoch	41	9	13	0	Rookie
Brad Faxon	36	10	16	1	3	1–2–0	33.33
Lee Janzen	33	15	39	1	2	0–2–0	0.00
Fred Couples	37	17	12	4	16	5–7–4	43.75

Captains picks are shown in yellow; the world rankings and records are at the start of the 1997 Ryder Cup.

== Friday's matches ==
=== Morning four-ball ===
	Results
Olazábal/Rocca	(Europe) 1 up	Love III/Mickelson
Faldo/Westwood	(United States) 1 up	Couples/Faxon
Parnevik/Johansson	(Europe) 1 up	Lehman/Furyk
Montgomerie/Langer	(United States) 3 & 2	Woods/O'Meara
2	Session	2
2	Overall	2

=== Afternoon foursomes ===
	Results
Rocca/Olazábal	(United States) 1 up	Hoch/Janzen
Langer/Montgomerie	(Europe) 5 & 3	O'Meara/Woods
Faldo/Westwood	(Europe) 3 & 2	Leonard/Maggert
Parnevik/Garrido	halved	Lehman/Mickelson
2 1/2	Session	1 1/2
4 1/2	Overall	3 1/2

== Saturday's matches ==
=== Morning four-ball ===
	Results
Montgomerie/Clarke	(Europe) 1 up	Couples/Love III
Woosnam/Bjørn	(Europe) 2 & 1	Leonard/Faxon
Faldo/Westwood	(Europe) 2 & 1	Woods/O'Meara
Olazábal/Garrido	halved	Mickelson/Lehman
3 1/2	Session	1/2
8	Overall	4

=== Afternoon foursomes ===
	Results
Montgomerie/Langer	(Europe) 1 up	Janzen/Furyk
Faldo/Westwood	(United States) 2 & 1	Hoch/Maggert
Parnevik/Garrido	halved	Leonard/Woods
Olazábal/Rocca	(Europe) 5 & 4	Love III/Couples
2 1/2	Session	1 1/2
10 1/2	Overall	5 1/2

== Sunday's singles matches ==
	Results
Ian Woosnam	(United States) 8 & 7	Fred Couples
Per-Ulrik Johansson	(Europe) 3 & 2	Davis Love III
Jesper Parnevik	(United States) 5 & 4	Mark O'Meara
Darren Clarke	(United States) 2 & 1	Phil Mickelson
Costantino Rocca	(Europe) 4 & 2	Tiger Woods
Thomas Bjørn	halved	Justin Leonard
Ignacio Garrido	(United States) 7 & 6	Tom Lehman
Bernhard Langer	(Europe) 2 & 1	Brad Faxon
Lee Westwood	(United States) 3 & 2	Jeff Maggert
José María Olazábal	(United States) 1 up	Lee Janzen
Nick Faldo	(United States) 3 & 2	Jim Furyk
Colin Montgomerie	halved	Scott Hoch
4	Session	8
14 1/2	Overall	13 1/2

== Individual player records ==
Each entry refers to the win–loss–half record of the player.

=== Europe ===
Player	Points	Overall	Singles	Foursomes	Fourballs
Thomas Bjørn	1.5	1–0–1	0–0–1	0–0–0	1–0–0
Darren Clarke	1	1–1–0	0–1–0	0–0–0	1–0–0
Nick Faldo	2	2–3–0	0–1–0	1–1–0	1–1–0
Ignacio Garrido	1.5	0–1–3	0–1–0	0–0–2	0–0–1
Per-Ulrik Johansson	2	2–0–0	1–0–0	0–0–0	1–0–0
Bernhard Langer	3	3–1–0	1–0–0	2–0–0	0–1–0
Colin Montgomerie	3.5	3–1–1	0–0–1	2–0–0	1–1–0
José María Olazábal	2.5	2–2–1	0–1–0	1–1–0	1–0–1
Jesper Parnevik	2	1–1–2	0–1–0	0–0–2	1–0–0
Costantino Rocca	3	3–1–0	1–0–0	1–1–0	1–0–0
Lee Westwood	2	2–3–0	0–1–0	1–1–0	1–1–0
Ian Woosnam	1	1–1–0	0–1–0	0–0–0	1–0–0

=== United States ===
Player	Points	Overall	Singles	Foursomes	Fourballs
Fred Couples	2	2–2–0	1–0–0	0–1–0	1–1–0
Brad Faxon	1	1–2–0	0–1–0	0–0–0	1–1–0
Jim Furyk	1	1–2–0	1–0–0	0–1–0	0–1–0
Scott Hoch	2.5	2–0–1	0–0–1	2–0–0	0–0–0
Lee Janzen	2	2–1–0	1–0–0	1–1–0	0–0–0
Tom Lehman	2	1–1–2	1–0–0	0–0–1	0–1–1
Justin Leonard	1	0–2–2	0–0–1	0–1–1	0–1–0
Davis Love III	0	0–4–0	0–1–0	0–1–0	0–2–0
Jeff Maggert	2	2–1–0	1–0–0	1–1–0	0–0–0
Phil Mickelson	2	1–1–2	1–0–0	0–0–1	0–1–1
Mark O'Meara	2	2–2–0	1–0–0	0–1–0	1–1–0
Tiger Woods	1.5	1–3–1	0–1–0	0–1–1	1–1–0
