= 1992 World Cup =

1992 World Cup may refer to:

- 1992 IAAF World Cup, athletics
- 1992 Cricket World Cup
- 1992 World Cup (men's golf)
- 1989–1992 Rugby League World Cup
- 1992 Alpine Skiing World Cup
