= Pedro Martínez (golfer) =

Paraguayan professional golfer

Personal information
- Full name: Pedro Rodolfo Martínez
- Nationality: Paraguay
- Born: 18 October 1963 (age 63) Asunción, Paraguay

Career
- Sport: Golf
- Turned professional: 1985
- Professional wins: 21

Achievements and awards
- South American Tour Order of Merit winner: 1996

Pedro Rodolfo Martínez (born 18 October 1963) is a Paraguayan professional golfer.

== Career ==
Martínez was born in 1963 in Asunción and turned professional in 1985.

Martínez played on the European Tour in 2000 and 2001, and achieved two top ten finishes the first season, tied 3rd in the Brazil São Paulo 500 Years Open and tied 6th in the Moroccan Open after leading after the first two rounds.

Martínez won the South American Tour Order of Merit in 1996, and the Pacific Tour Ranking (Chile) in 1996 and 1997.

== Professional wins (21) ==
=== Tour de las Américas wins (4) ===
- 1993 Los Inkas Peru Open
- 1996 La Sabana Open, Argentina Open
- 2002 LG Panama Masters

=== Chilean wins (8) ===
- 1989 Country Club Open
- 1992 Prince of Wales Open
- 1994 Viña del Mar Open
- 1995 Sports Frances Open
- 1996 Marbella Open
- 1997 Santo Domingo Open
- 2005 Viña del Mar Open
- 2008 Viña del Mar Open

=== Other Argentine wins (4) ===
- 1988 North Open
- 1990 Jockey Club Rosario Open
- 1998 Metropolitan Championship
- 2000 Norpatagonico Open

=== Other wins (5) ===
- 1990 Brazil Open
- 1991 Paraguay Open
- 1995 Calaway Cup (Paraguay), Farallones Open (Paraguay)
- 2006 El Rodeo Open (Colombia)

== Team appearances ==
- Alfred Dunhill Cup (representing Paraguay): 1991, 1998
- World Cup (representing Paraguay): 1993, 1994, 1998, 1999
