= John Daly (golfer) =

American professional golfer (born 1966)

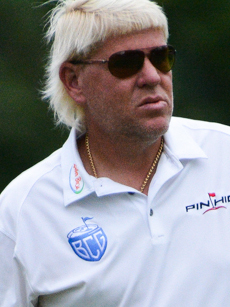
- Daly at the 2013 Greenbrier Classic Pro-Am Day

Personal information
- Full name: John Patrick Daly
- Nickname: Long John
- Nationality: United States
- Born: April 28, 1966 (age 60) Carmichael, California, U.S.
- Height: 5 ft 11 in (180 cm)
- Weight: 250 lb (110 kg; 17 st 12 lb)
- Spouses: Dale Crafton (m. 1987; div. 1990) Bettye Fulford (m. 1992; div. 1995) Paulette Dean (m. 1995; div. 1999) Sherrie Miller (m. 2001; div. 2007)
- Children: 3

Career
- Sport: Golf
- College: University of Arkansas
- Turned professional: 1987
- Current tours: PGA Tour (joined 1987); PGA Tour Champions (joined 2016)
- Former tours: European Tour (joined 2002); Southern Africa Tour; Ben Hogan Tour
- Professional wins: 19
- Highest ranking: 23 (October 9, 2005)

Number of wins by tour
- PGA Tour: 5
- European Tour: 3
- Asian Tour: 1
- Sunshine Tour: 2
- Korn Ferry Tour: 1
- PGA Tour Champions: 1
- Other: 8

Best results in major championships (wins: 2)
- Masters Tournament: T3: 1993
- PGA Championship: Won: 1991
- U.S. Open: T27: 1996
- The Open Championship: Won: 1995

Achievements and awards
- PGA Tour Rookie of the Year: 1991
- PGA Tour Comeback Player of the Year: 2004

John Patrick Daly (born April 28, 1966) is an American professional golfer on the PGA Tour and PGA Tour Champions. Daly is known primarily for his driving distance off the tee (earning him the nickname "Long John"), his non-country-club or "weird" appearance and attitude, his exceptionally long back-swing, the inconsistency of his play (with exceptional performances and controversial incidents), and his personal life. His two greatest on-course accomplishments are his "zero-to-hero" victory in the 1991 PGA Championship, and his playoff victory over Costantino Rocca in the 1995 Open Championship.

In addition to his wins on U.S. soil, Daly has won accredited pro events in South Africa, Swaziland (Eswatini), Scotland, Germany, South Korea, Turkey, and Canada.

According to official performance statistics kept since 1980, Daly in 1997 became the first PGA Tour player to average more than 300 yards per drive over a full season. He did so again in every year from 1999 to 2008, and he was the only player to do so until 2003. Daly also led the PGA Tour in driving distance 11 times from 1991 to 2002 with the exception of 1994 when Davis Love III took his spot that year.

Daly's last PGA Tour victory came in San Diego in 2004, earning him a two-year playing exemption. Daly struggled to maintain regular PGA Tour status after 2006. He continued to enter PGA Tour events through his past champion status and sponsor exemptions. Since 2016, Daly has competed on the PGA Tour Champions circuit, winning the 2017 Insperity Invitational.

Daly is the only man from either Europe or the United States to win two major golf championships but not be selected for the Ryder Cup since that event began in 1927.

Daly has been successful in multiple businesses. He is endorsed by LoudMouth Golf Apparel and owns a golf course design company. In addition, Daly has written and recorded music, and has released two music albums. He appeared in the 2025 film Happy Gilmore 2 as a fictionalized version of himself.

== Early life ==
Daly was born in Carmichael, California, on April 28, 1966. His father is Jim Daly, a construction worker for industrial plants; his mother is Lou Daly, a homemaker. The working-class family moved frequently during Daly's formative years, living in small towns across the Southern states. His father often worked night shifts and sometimes commuted significant distances between work and home.

With his father, mother, older sister, and older brother Jamie, John moved from California to Dardanelle, Arkansas, when he was four. John began playing golf the following year at the Bay Ridge Boat and Golf Club there. From his start in golf, he admired Jack Nicklaus, the dominant professional player of the time. When John was ten, his family moved to Locust Grove, Orange County, Virginia. John played golf there at the Lake of the Woods Golf Course in Locust Grove, where he won the spring club championship at age 13, defeating all the male members; the club promptly changed its rules, barring juniors from future open club competition. The Dalys next moved to Zachary, Louisiana, where John completed ninth grade and half of the tenth grade.

John then attended Helias High School in Jefferson City, Missouri, the state capital, from the middle of his sophomore year, and was a junior golf member at the Jefferson City Country Club. He was a letterman there in football and golf. With John handling both punting and place-kicking duties, Helias football compiled a 10–0 record in 1983. In golf, John was a 1983 Missouri state team HS champion with Helias; he also holds several Helias school kicking records in football.

For his first significant golf success, he won the 1983 Missouri State Amateur Championship and followed up by winning the 1984 Arkansas State Amateur Championship. He completed his final three months of high school at Dardanelle High School in spring 1984. Back at the Bay Ridge club that summer, Daly became friends with Rick Ross, who was a golf teaching professional there, and Ross assisted him with his golf game for the next several years.

== Amateur career ==
Daly attended the University of Arkansas, from 1984 to 1987, on a golf scholarship, and was a member of the golf team. His golf team coaches were Steve Loy and Bill Woodley. Daly had tempestuous relationships with both due to his drinking problems and infrequent class attendance. Daly qualified for the 1986 U.S. Open, one of the four majors of male professional golf, as an amateur, and missed the 36-hole cut with scores of 88 and 76.

== Professional career ==
Daly left college without completing his degree and turned professional in summer 1987. His first pro victory came shortly afterwards, in the 1987 Missouri Open. From 1987 to 1989, Daly played mainly in minor events around the U.S., and had some encouraging success during the 1989–90 season on the Southern African Tour. He won the AECI Charity Classic with only Northern Irishman David Feherty behind him. Daly also won the Hollard Royal Swazi Sun Classic over South African veteran John Bland.

=== Ben Hogan Tour ===
Daly earned full playing privileges on the Ben Hogan Tour for 1990, winning the qualifying tournament for the new circuit early that year. He then won two Sunshine Tour events early in 1990, one in South Africa (where he edged David Feherty), and one in Swaziland (where established veteran champion John Bland placed second). This was encouraging for Daly to win good-caliber events, defeat more experienced and well-established international professionals, and play before good-sized galleries which appreciated his performances.

Daly then won the 1990 Ben Hogan Utah Classic, and completed a fine year by finishing T-12 at the 1990 PGA Tour Qualifying Tournament, earning 1991 PGA Tour privileges on his fourth attempt.

=== PGA Tour ===
He joined the PGA Tour in 1991, showed increasingly strong play throughout the year, and then won the PGA Championship that August. This victory gained Daly a significant amount of media attention, due to the fact that Daly was the ninth and final alternate for the Championship. Just days before the tournament Nick Price dropped out, since his wife Sue was about to give birth. Daly, playing just his third major, was able to have Price's caddie Jeff (Squeaky) Medlin caddy for him. Daly had to drive through the night to arrive in time to claim his spot. A virtual unknown at the time, he achieved a first-round score of 69, even though he had not had time to play a practice round at the exceptionally difficult Crooked Stick Golf Club course near Indianapolis. He finished the tournament with scores of 69-67-69-71, giving him a three-stroke victory over veteran Bruce Lietzke, who was 15 years older. His feat generated enormous media coverage, propelling the hitherto virtually unknown Tour rookie to international fame. Late in the season, Daly finished 3rd place at the 1991 Tour Championship. He then became the first PGA Tour rookie to be invited to compete in the Skins Game, a made-for-television event featuring four top players, and he performed well there finishing 2nd. Daly was subsequently named PGA Tour Rookie of the Year for 1991. He was also the first rookie to win a major title since Jerry Pate won the U.S. Open in 1976.

His surprise victory and powerful swing provided the impetus for a cult-like fan base, composed of many people who had not been previously attracted to golf, and from that point onwards, Daly became one of the most popular players on Tour. He added to his reputation as a power hitter in 1993 by becoming, apparently, the first (and still the only) player to reach the green of the famous 630-yard hole 17 at Baltusrol Golf Club's Lower Course in two strokes.

Under pressure from his zero-to-hero victory at the 1991 PGA Championship, Daly started the 1992 season with several top 10 finishes, including finishing 5th at The International, T-2 at the Kemper Open, and T-8 at the Buick Southern Open and the Nissan Los Angeles Open. At the 1992 PGA Championship, Daly struggled as the defending champion. He finished the tournament with rounds of 76-72-79-77 and, finishing in 82nd place. However, he recovered to win the B.C. Open by six strokes late in the season for his second PGA Tour title.

Daly's 1993 season was his least successful since joining the PGA Tour. He notably finished T-3 at the Masters Tournament and for his only top-10 finish in a major championship outside his two wins. Although he had no PGA Tour wins in 1993, Daly did win the Alfred Dunhill Cup with Fred Couples and Payne Stewart. He finished the season with five top-25 finishes and one top-10 finish out of 15 cuts.

In 1994, Daly experienced one of his most turbulent years. He was suspended by the PGA Tour from late 1993 into early 1994 due to behavior which included walking off the course mid-round during the 1993 late-season Kapalua International, a mid-1993 incident at the Kemper Open that saw him disqualified for throwing his scorecard at the scoring tent after shooting 77, and an incident at the 1993 Southern Open where Daly walked off the course without telling his partners he was quitting. He entered alcohol rehab for three weeks in late 1993 before returning to the Tour to win the 1994 BellSouth Classic. This was his third PGA Tour title, which he claimed to be his first sober win.

In 1995, in the midst of a middling season, Daly unexpectedly won The Open Championship in a playoff with Italy's Costantino Rocca at the Old Course at St Andrews. Daly had prior excellent results on this course at the Dunhill Cup, and although he was listed at very long odds by bookmakers, some perceptive golf watchers, including David Feherty, believed before the event that the Old Course suited Daly's game well. Daly was in contention from the start of the event, but trailed New Zealand's Michael Campbell heading into a very windy final round. Campbell fell back in the difficult conditions, and Daly played a superb final round. As Rocca, in the last group, approached the final hole, he was one shot behind Daly, who had already finished his round. Rocca's long drive was only yards from the green, but his second shot resulted in a fluffed chip. Rocca then sank a 60-foot (18 metre) putt to make the birdie he needed to force a playoff with Daly. Daly easily defeated Rocca in the playoff, finishing the four holes of the playoff at one under par, while Rocca finished three over par after hitting into the "Road Hole Bunker" on the 17th hole, and taking three shots to get out.

Daly is the only eligible two-time major winner never selected to play in the Ryder Cup.

=== 1996–2000: Struggles ===
After winning the 1995 Open Championship, Daly would continue with his golf game and drinking habits, causing him to suffer a six-year win drought on the European Tour and a nine-year win drought on the PGA Tour. In 1996, Daly finished T-19 at The Players Championship and had a top-10 finish at the Kemper Open. At the 1996 U.S. Open, Daly finished T-27 with a final round 73, his best finish in the tournament. Daly's only win in 1996 was at the AT&T Australian Skins Game which was neither a PGA or European Tour event.

Daly started off the 1997 season by finishing 7th place at the Bob Hope Chrysler Classic. Afterwards, Daly's struggles at the time culminated in one of his worst seasons on the PGA Tour, withdrawing from the U.S. Open after a first-round 77 due to his physical conditioning and Delirium tremens. It is reported that at this time Daly was attending Alcoholics Anonymous meetings. During the 1997 Players Championship, Daly opened with a round of 76. Afterward, he reportedly spent three hours drinking at a nightspot and subsequently destroyed his hotel room. Daly was later hospitalized for chest pains and ultimately withdrew from the tournament. Late in the season, Daly was tied for the lead in the first round of the 1997 PGA Championship scoring 66 with birdies on the last three holes. This momentum quickly vanished as Daly shot a third round 77; after falling out of contention, Daly drove a ball out of bounds and threw his club into the woods. During the final round, Daly believed that one of his drives landed in an unplayable lie. A rules official denied Daly's request for relief, which led to a heated argument and left Daly irritated. Despite shooting 70 in the final round, Daly finished the tournament tied for 29th place.

In 1998, Daly recorded one of the highest scores on a single hole in PGA Tour golf history, shooting an 18 on the sixth hole at the Bay Hill Invitational. Daly finished the 1998 season with two top-10 finishes including finishing T-16 at the Player's Championship with a final round 69, his best finish in the tournament. He also withdrew from the Sprint International and the Disney Classic and was disqualified from the FedEx St. Jude Classic.

In 1999, Daly won the JCPenney Classic, which was neither a PGA or European Tour event, but had a weak PGA Tour season, with only three top-25 finishes; he also withdrew from several tournaments during this season. Daly also scored high rounds of 82 at the Memorial Tournament and 83 at the Player's Championship. At the 1999 U.S. Open, Daly finished 68th place after leading the tournament in the first round. After some struggles during the tournament, Daly said he would never play in the U.S. Open again, although he would later apologize. In 2000, Daly had a horrific 2000 season on the PGA Tour, with only one top-25 finish at the Honda Classic. He also withdrew from the U.S. Open after shooting an opening round 83.

=== 2001: Win in Germany ===
In 2001, Daly won the BMW International Open by one stroke over Pádraig Harrington, with a personal best score of 27 under par for four rounds. This was the first time Daly had won a European Tour event in six years. He would also have his best PGA Tour season since 1995, where his best result was finishing 4th at the Bell Canadian Open.

=== 2002–2003: Off-Tour and Team Wins ===
In 2002, Daly was inducted into the Arkansas Golf Hall of Fame, and had two top-10 finishes on the PGA Tour, 4th-place finishes at the Buick Invitational and the Phoenix Open. Daly also made the cut at the 2002 Masters finishing T-32, which would be the final time making the cut at the Masters. He also won the Champions Challenge that year, which was neither a PGA or European Tour event. In 2003, Daly did not have a good season, finishing T-7 at the Shell Houston Open, and winning two other tournaments that were neither PGA Tour or European Tour events, including the 2003 Korea Open, the most prestigious event on the Korean Tour. However, In both 2002 and 2003, Daly was a member of the winning PGA Tour team in the Wendy's 3-Tour Challenge event, competing against teams from the Champions Tour and the LPGA Tour.

=== 2004: Comeback ===
Daly won the Buick Invitational in 2004, and he was also selected as PGA Tour Comeback Player of the Year for 2004. Daly won the tournament in a playoff against Luke Donald and Chris Riley. This was Daly's first tournament using Dunlop golf equipment, and his first victory in 189 PGA Tour events. At the time, Daly had not won a PGA Tour event since 1995, and none on American soil since 1994. This would see Daly increase his world golf ranking from 299th to a spot in the Top 50 during this time frame. Daly also finished 2nd place at the Buick Open. Overall, Daly ranked 4th on the PGA Tour for the 2004 season, making the cut 17 times out of 22 events.

=== 2005–2006: Two near-misses ===
At the 2005 WGC-American Express Championship, a tournament that would have extended his PGA Tour exemption through 2008, Daly tied with Tiger Woods at the end of regulation play. However, Daly missed a short par putt on the 2nd extra playoff hole, giving Woods the victory. Daly would also reach a playoff at the 2005 Shell Houston Open, but lost on the first extra hole to Vijay Singh.

Daly's form declined in 2006, where he would only make cuts in 8 of 21 events, and he would withdraw from five events. Daly had only one Top-25 finish in 2006, T-17 at the WGC-Accenture Match Play Championship.

=== 2007–2015: PGA Tour non-exempt status ===
Daly entered the 2007 PGA Tour season without full exempt status for the first time since his 1991 PGA Championship victory, which carried a 10-year PGA Tour exemption. Another such exemption was earned with his 1995 Open Championship win. When Daly won the 2004 Buick Invitational, he earned a two-year exemption, which expired at the end of 2006. Daly finished 193rd on the 2006 PGA Tour Official Money List, thereby losing his full exempt status for 2007. To upgrade his non-exempt status, Daly could have re-entered the PGA Tour qualifying process, but instead chose to rely upon sponsor exemptions to gain entry to PGA Tour events.

Daly was invited to play in the Honda Classic on March 1, 2007, on a sponsor's exemption, but was forced to withdraw after two holes after he pulled a muscle near his shoulder blade trying to stop his backswing after a fan snapped a picture. In December 2008, he was suspended for six months by the PGA Tour after an incident involving the Winston-Salem police.

After his 2008 suspension, Daly was forced to compete on the European Tour. After undergoing lap-band surgery to lose 40 pounds, he began playing better, including finishing 2nd at the Italian Open. On May 26, 2009, Daly announced that he would return to the PGA Tour via sponsor's exemption for the St. Jude Classic.Daly's last top finish on an elite tour came at the 2009 Italian Open, where he finished in a distant tie for second to Daniel Vancsik of Argentina. On July 17, Daly told The Dan Patrick Show that he had lost 80 pounds thanks to the surgery, dropping him to 205 lbs. Daly would not win another professional tournament until December 2014, when he won the Beko Classic at Gloria Golf Club in Belek, Antalya, Turkey an event sanctioned by the PGA of Europe. However, after shooting a then personal-high 88 at the Buick Open in late July 2009, he claimed to be losing confidence in his game; his swing coach blamed the surgery for making him lose muscle along with weight, taking power away from his swing, but Daly blamed his high golf score on poor eyesight affecting his putting.

Daly shot a score of 68 for the first round of the 2012 PGA Championship which was played at Kiawah Island, South Carolina. Daly finished 18th place in that tournament, which was the first time Daly had finished in the top 20 in a major championship since the Open in 2005.

On March 14, 2014, during the second round of the Valspar Championship, Daly shot a career worst 90 which included an 8-over-par 12 on the 16th hole. His frequent failure to make cuts and high rounds would create debates around players who frequently receive sponsor exemptions.

Daly continued to play mostly abroad due to his limited status on the PGA Tour. In the late fall of 2014 Daly started to show some promise finishing T-29 at the Sanderson Farms Championship, and then quietly finishing T-10 at the Puerto Rico Open, his first top-10 finish in three years. Soon after, Daly finished T-25 at the Turkish Airlines Open, a European Tour event with a strong field. Daly won the Beko Classic on December 6, 2014, an event sanctioned by the PGAs of Europe, finishing at −15. It was Daly's first win in over 10 years. At the end of 2015, Daly tried to get back his European Tour card in Shanghai; he finished T-46 at the BMW Masters and T-50 at the Turkish Airlines Open failing to get back his card.

=== 2016–present: PGA Tour Champions ===
Having turned 50 on April 28, 2016, Daly became eligible to play on the PGA Tour Champions. His debut was at the Insperity Invitational in May, where he finished tied for 17th.

On May 7, 2017, Daly won the Insperity Invitational on the PGA Tour Champions after shooting a 14-under par for the tournament. It was his first win of a PGA Tour-affiliated event since 2004, and it happened exactly one year after he made his PGA Tour Champions debut. He would also finish T-2 at the 2021 Insperity Invitational. Daly continues to compete semi-regularly on the tour.

Although Daly had $10,270,681 in career earnings as of February 20, 2023, he is not among the top 50 on the PGA Tour's All-Time Career Money List, and thus relies on sponsor invitations (PGA Tour Exemption Category 11).

Daly is exempt for life in the PGA Championship and AT&T Pebble Beach National Pro-Am, and up to age 60 in the Open Championship. In order to play in the Masters, U.S. Open, a World Golf Championship or a FedEx Cup Playoff Event, Daly would have to satisfy the particular invitational requirements of such events. Daly has not played at the Masters since 2006, and he has not made the cut there since 2002.

=== Golf swing ===
Daly has a self-taught golf swing which was built for power and distance. Daly takes his golf club back much farther past parallel on his back swing by extreme coiling of his arms and shoulders which creates exceptional club head speed on his down swing. However, Daly's golf swing has contributed to his inconsistent performance during golf tournaments since almost perfect timing is required for proper execution of such a powerful golf swing.

=== Incidents during golf tournaments ===
Daly has had several incidents during golf tournaments which have contributed to his "Wild Thing" image including the following:

- During an exhibition clinic at the 1993 Fred Meyer Challenge, Daly started hitting balls over the heads of spectators in a grandstand to show off his driving talents. This privately infuriated fellow PGA golfer Peter Jacobsen, the host of the event. The PGA Tour would issue Daly a $30,000 fine.
- During the 1993 Kapalua International, after missing a birdie putt on the eleventh hole, Daly was disqualified for picking up his ball and putting it in his pocket with the intent of quitting the tournament. He was then suspended by the PGA Tour.
- During the 1994 PGA Tour's NEC World Series of Golf, Daly hit several shots into the group playing in front of him on the 14th hole in the final round. Daly drove the green twice and one of those shots almost hit fellow professional golfer Jeff Roth, leading to a scuffle between Daly and Jeff Roth's father. They wrestled to the ground and the altercation was broken up by fans. Daly was then fined $13,000 by the PGA Tour and banned for the rest of the season.
- During the 1998 PGA Tour's Bay Hill Invitational, Daly used a three-wood to hit six golf balls into the water during the final round. Daly finally got his seventh attempt over the water which was a distance of approximately 270 yards. Daly shot an 18 on the par-five sixth hole and finished the round with a score of 85.
- During the 1998 PGA Tour's FedEx St. Jude Classic, Daly hit a 5-iron shot out of bounds on the par-4 17th hole, took a drop, and hit his ball with the same club again out of bounds. Daly then proceeded to break his club. He finished with a score of 74, walked off the course, and was disqualified for not signing his scorecard.
- During the 1999 U.S. Open, Daly took a two-stroke penalty for hitting his ball while it was moving on the par-4 eighth hole. He carded an 11 on the eighth hole, shot a final round score of 83, and finished 68th place. Daly said he took the penalty in protest against the USGA for placing too many unfair pins on Pinehurst No. 2's mounded greens.
- In the 2000 U.S. Open, he shot a 14 on the par-five 18th hole and withdrew after an opening-round 83. Daly hit three golf balls into the Pacific Ocean and another into a backyard next to the fairway.
- At the 2002 Australian PGA Championship, after making a triple-bogey seven on his last hole at the Coolum course in Australia, Daly threw his putter and ball into a pond and later failed to sign for a 78 on his scorecard, disqualifying himself from the tournament. Daly was later fined by the Australian Tour and ordered to write a letter of apology to a tour official he verbally abused.
- During the 2008 Australian Open, he broke a spectator's camera at Royal Sydney's ninth hole. He was given a suspended fine by Golf Australia.
- Daly walked off during his first round at the 2011 Australian Open after hitting all of his golf balls into the water. Daly's problems started on the 10th hole when he received an automatic two-stroke penalty for hitting the wrong ball in the bunker. On the 11th hole, he hit seven golf balls in the water before leaving the tournament.
- In the second round of the 2015 PGA Championship at the Whistling Straits Golf Course in Haven, Wisconsin, Daly, who was on the cut line, hit three consecutive tee shot attempts into the water of Lake Michigan at the par-3 7th hole. He used a 4-iron on the first unsuccessful try, then switched to a 6-iron on the next two failed tries. After his fourth attempt (his 7th shot), which found the green, Daly was so livid about his shot selection that he threw his 6-iron into Lake Michigan. Daly ended up scoring a septuple-bogey 10, dropping to +8. He finished the round with an 82 and missed the cut.

== Charity works ==
After winning the PGA Championship at Crooked Stick Golf Club in 1991, Daly gave $30,000 to the family of a man who died during the tournament due to lightning strike. The money was used by the family to pay college expenses for the man's two daughters.

Daly is known for his involvement in many charities including several in northwest Arkansas. He has donated money to his high school, the Make-A-Wish Foundation, and Boys and Girls Clubs of America. Daly is also an active supporter of the sports programs at the University of Arkansas. He shaved his signature "mullet", and donated the proceeds from the event to various charities. Daly regularly plays in the celebrity Pro-Am Monday after the Masters hosted by his friends, Hootie & the Blowfish.

== Business activities ==
Daly is in partnership with Loudmouth Golf line of clothing, which includes licensing deals with the NFL's Dallas Cowboys and Arkansas Razorbacks. In 2014, Daly signed an endorsement deal with Rock Bottom Golf, a discount golf retailer. In 2006, he launched a wine label John Daly Wines that later went defunct. In 2023, he launched a line of cannabis products.

Daly also has a company which designs golf courses (JD Designs), including Sevillano Links at Rolling Hills Casino in Corning, California. Sevillano Links is one of the few links style golf courses in the Western United States, and named "Best New Golf Course" by Golfweek magazine. Other golf courses that John Daly helped design include:

- Wicked Stick Golf Links, Myrtle Beach, South Carolina (closed)
- Blarney Golf Resort, County Cork, Ireland
- Thundering Waters Golf Club, Niagara Falls, Ontario, Canada
- Murder Rock Golf Club, Branson, Missouri
- The Lion's Den, Dardanelle, Arkansas
- Legacy Golf Course at the 19, Mason City, Iowa

== Music career ==
Daly provided back-up vocals in the 2007 Kid Rock song, "Half Your Age". In April 2010, Daly released his second music album called I Only Know One Way on Long Ball Records/Hopesong Digital/GMV Nashville. He wrote and co-wrote eight tracks on the album. One track includes Hootie and the Blowfish's lead singer Darius Rucker and a cover of Bob Dylan's "Knockin' On Heaven's Door". John said about his perspective on his music: "The album itself is really my life. All of the songs have a meaning. Most of the record is happening or has happened in my life. I hope people can relate to some of the troubles I have had along the way. Everyone around the world has problems, and I want to connect with those people." Daly's first album, My Life, included guest vocals by Darius, Willie Nelson and Johnny Lee.

=== Studio albums ===
Title	Details	Peak chart positions		Sales
Title	Details	US Country	US	Sales
My Life	Release date: 2002; Label: Scream Marketing; Formats: CD	—	—	US: —
I Only Know One Way	Release date: April 26, 2010; Label: Long Ball Records / Hopesong Digital / GMV Nashville; Formats: CD, music download	—	—	US: —
Whiskey & Water	Release date: March 5, 2022; Label: John Daly; Formats: music download	—	—	US: —

=== Singles ===
Year	Title	Peak chart positions		Album
Year	Title	US Country	The Highway: Hot 45 Countdown	Album
2014	"Hit It Hard"	—	10	I Only Know One Way
"—" denotes releases that did not chart

=== Other appearances ===
Year	Song	Album
2007	"Half Your Age" (with Kid Rock)	Rock n Roll Jesus

== Personal life ==
=== Alcohol ===
Daly has struggled with alcoholism throughout his life and golf career. He said that he was around 8–10 years old when he started drinking. Daly also said that he stopped drinking whiskey in 1990, instead consuming other alcoholic drinks. From 1989 to 1993, he was hospitalized four times for alcohol poisoning. After undergoing alcohol rehabilitation in late 1993, he reportedly went on candy and burger eating binges to reduce the need to drink alcohol; this reportedly continued through Daly's victories at the 1994 BellSouth Classic and the 1995 Open Championship.

In 1996, Daly reportedly started drinking alcohol again, claiming he only drank a few beers. He then fell back into his excessive drinking habits in 1997 and proceeded to check himself into an alcohol rehabilitation center for the second time. During this time, he also lost his sponsorships with Wilson and Reebok. During the 1998 season, as Daly was recovering from his alcoholism, he suffered alcoholic shakes during the first round of the Greater Vancouver Open. During the 1999 season, Daly relapsed and started drinking again after missing the cut at the FedEx St. Jude Classic. He then lost his sponsorship with Callaway due to his relapse.

Starting in 2000, Daly was reportedly drinking on and off throughout the decade. However, it seemed he had a lot more control over his drinking habits and rowdy behavior during the 2000s.

In March 2008, Daly's swing coach Butch Harmon quit, saying that "the most important thing in (Daly's) life is getting drunk." Daly responded by saying, "I think his lies kind of destroyed my life for a little bit."

On October 26, 2008, Daly was taken into protective custody by Winston-Salem police after being found drunk outside a Hooters restaurant. He was not arrested or charged with a violation. However, the police released his mug shot to the media which resulted in negative publicity. Shortly after this incident, Daly committed to stop drinking alcohol, which resulted in a progressive resurgence of his game and a positive change in his personal life; this was confirmed by Daly himself at The Open Championship on July 15, 2010.

In an interview on The Dan Patrick Show on August 6, 2014, Daly said that much of his past struggle with alcohol was due to growing up with an alcoholic and abusive father.

=== Health ===
In July 1994, Daly claimed that many PGA golfers were cocaine users, and said that if drug testing was done properly on tour, he would be "one of the cleanest guys out there". This statement brought an uproar among the pro golf community.

In early 2009, he had lap-band surgery which limits the amount of food that he can consume. As of December 8, 2009, Daly had shed well over 100 pounds and was "a slim, trim 185".

In July 2019, Daly had a near-death experience after being reportedly bitten by a brown recluse spider while he was vacationing in England. He had developed sepsis and required an emergency surgery.

In September 2020, Daly announced he had recently battled with bladder cancer. He underwent surgery to remove the cancer, but doctors said there was an 85 percent chance of relapse. To reduce the chance of recurrence, Daly planned to improve his previously unhealthy lifestyle which involved smoking and drinking large amounts of Diet Coke.

=== Gambling ===
In 1999, Daly was reported to have lost $51 million from gambling in the mid-1990s and he was feeling the effects of his gambling when he had to sell his Mercedes and his house in California. Daly claimed he would sit at blackjack tables with $220,000 on a single hand. He would bet as high as $50,000 on a football game but he never bet on a golf game. Daly also expressed great difficulty at the time in paying alimony, child support, and other expenses as less money was coming in due to his struggles on and off the golf course.

In 2006, Daly revealed in the last chapter of his autobiography that he has had great difficulty with his gambling problem. He claims to have lost between $50 and $60 million over a 15-year period. This includes losing $1.5 million in October 2005, after winning half that amount at the WGC-American Express tournament, most of it lost on a $5,000 Las Vegas slot machine at Wynn Casino.

=== Marriages ===
Daly married Dale Crafton in 1987. Crafton was a well-known hand model who came from a wealthy family in Arkansas. Daly was trying to support his wife and himself by making it to the PGA Tour. However, Daly was miserable living with Dale in her hometown of Blytheville. They divorced in 1990 due to irreconcilable differences.

In summer 1992, he married his second wife, Bettye Fulford. They had a daughter. In December 1992, Daly was charged with third-degree assault for throwing Bettye into a wall at their home near Denver. The actual circumstances of the incident remained unclear so far as public releases were concerned, since Bettye did not wish to pursue the matter. Daly has said in his autobiography that he did not, nor has he ever, hit or hurt a woman.

After Daly's divorce with Fulford was finalized in 1995, he married Paulette Dean that same year. A daughter was born on June 1, 1995. The couple divorced in 1999.

On July 29, 2001, he married Sherrie Miller. Their son was born July 23, 2003. On June 8, 2007, Daly and Sherrie got into a fight at a restaurant in Memphis, Tennessee, site of that week's tour stop, the Stanford St. Jude Championship. Daly claims that later that night his wife attacked him with a steak knife. He showed up for his second round on Friday afternoon with cuts and scrapes across his face. Authorities were contacted by him and came to his house, but his wife had already fled the scene and taken their son with her.

Sherrie (at some point) pleaded guilty to federal drug charges and was sentenced to a five-month prison term. On December 17, 2010, in Memphis, Circuit Court Judge Donna Fields awarded custody of the couple's seven-year-old son to Daly, and jailed Sherrie for interfering with Daly's court-ordered visitation rights and other failures to abide by the court's orders in their ongoing divorce proceeding, saying "She is not following this court's orders. That is criminal contempt."

=== Lawsuits ===
In 2005, Daly sued the Florida Times-Union for libel after a columnist claimed Daly "failed the scoundrel sniff test." A judge threw out the case in 2009, saying that Daly had failed to prove the basis of the libel claim: namely, that the statements were untrue. Daly was also ordered by a judge to pay the newspaper over $300,000 in legal fees.

In 2008, Daly sued Hippo Golf for using his name on a golf club they were selling without his permission. The judge ruled in favor of Daly. However, the judge also denied the motion for Hippo Golf to pay Daly any damages.

In 2010, Daly sued a children's charity and the PGA Tour for $100 million from an injury he sustained at the 2007 Honda Classic. As of 2015, the litigation is still ongoing.

=== Political views and activism ===
Daly is a Republican and vocal supporter of Donald Trump.

Daly has advocated for the legalization of cannabis in Arkansas, endorsing a ballot measure in 2022 that he said would create "millions in new funding for our police, ... thousands of good jobs, [and] revenue for our state".

=== Video games ===
Daly became the first of two real people to make an appearance in the Everybody's Golf series, appearing in the third installment, Hot Shots Golf 3; the other is Shigeki Maruyama, who appeared in Everybody's Golf 5.

He also appears in the popular arcade golf game Golden Tee.

He appeared in the Tiger Woods PGA Tour video game series from 2004 to 2009.

In 2010, Daly partnered with publisher Oxygen Games for John Daly's Prostroke Golf for the Xbox 360, PS3, and PC. In the game, John Daly is both an instructor and an opponent for players across twelve courses modeled after real-world courses.

== High school and amateur wins ==
- 1979 Spring Club Championship, Lake of the Woods Club, Fredericksburg, Virginia
- 1983 Missouri State HS Team Championship, 1A-3A division, with Helias High School, Jefferson City
- 1983 Missouri State Amateur Championship
- 1984 Arkansas State Amateur Championship

== Professional wins (19) ==
=== PGA Tour wins (5) ===
Legend
Major championships (2)
Other PGA Tour (3)

No.	Date	Tournament	Winning score	Margin of victory	Runner(s)-up
1	Aug 11, 1991	PGA Championship	−12 (69-67-69-71=276)	3 strokes	(United States) Bruce Lietzke
2	Sep 27, 1992	B.C. Open	−18 (67-66-67-66=266)	6 strokes	(United States) Joel Edwards, (United States) Ken Green, (United States) Jay Haas, (United States) Nolan Henke
3	May 8, 1994	BellSouth Classic	−14 (69-64-69-72=274)	1 stroke	(United States) Nolan Henke, (United States) Brian Henninger
4	Jul 23, 1995	The Open Championship	−6 (67-71-73-71=282)	Playoff	(Italy) Costantino Rocca
5	Feb 15, 2004	Buick Invitational	−10 (69-66-68-75=278)	Playoff	(England) Luke Donald, (United States) Chris Riley

PGA Tour playoff record (2–2)

No.	Year	Tournament	Opponent(s)	Result
1	1995	The Open Championship	(Italy) Costantino Rocca	Won four-hole aggregate playoff; Daly: −1 (4-3-4-4=15), Rocca: +3 (5-4-7-3=19)
2	2004	Buick Invitational	(England) Luke Donald, (United States) Chris Riley	Won with birdie on first extra hole
3	2005	Shell Houston Open	(Fiji) Vijay Singh	Lost to par on first extra hole
4	2005	WGC-American Express Championship	(United States) Tiger Woods	Lost to par on second extra hole

=== European Tour wins (3) ===
Legend
Major championships (2)
Other European Tour (1)

No.	Date	Tournament	Winning score	Margin of victory	Runner-up
1	Aug 11, 1991	PGA Championship	−12 (69-67-69-71=276)	3 strokes	(United States) Bruce Lietzke
2	Jul 23, 1995	The Open Championship	−6 (67-71-73-71=282)	Playoff	(Italy) Costantino Rocca
3	Sep 2, 2001	BMW International Open	−27 (63-64-68-66=261)	1 stroke	(Republic of Ireland) Pádraig Harrington

European Tour playoff record (1–1)

No.	Year	Tournament	Opponent	Result
1	1995	The Open Championship	(Italy) Costantino Rocca	Won four-hole aggregate playoff; Daly: −1 (4-3-4-4=15), Rocca: +3 (5-4-7-3=19)
2	2005	WGC-American Express Championship	(United States) Tiger Woods	Lost to par on second extra hole

=== Asian PGA Tour wins (1) ===
No.	Date	Tournament	Winning score	Margin of victory	Runner-up
1	Oct 12, 2003	Kolon Korea Open^{1}	−6 (73-69-72-68=282)	2 strokes	(Thailand) Thaworn Wiratchant

^{1}Co-sanctioned by the Korean Tour

=== Southern Africa Tour wins (2) ===
No.	Date	Tournament	Winning score	Margin of victory	Runner-up
1	Feb 3, 1990	AECI Charity Classic	−24 (70-67-62-65=264)	1 stroke	(Northern Ireland) David Feherty
2	Feb 18, 1990	Hollard Royal Swazi Sun Classic	−21 (66-71-64-66=267)	2 strokes	(South Africa) John Bland

=== Ben Hogan Tour wins (1) ===
No.	Date	Tournament	Winning score	Margin of victory	Runner-up
1	Sep 16, 1990	Ben Hogan Utah Classic	−13 (65-69-69=203)	1 stroke	(United States) R. W. Eaks

Ben Hogan Tour playoff record (0–1)

No.	Year	Tournament	Opponents	Result
1	1990	Ben Hogan Gateway Open	(United States) Bruce Fleisher, (United States) Ted Tryba	Tryba won with eagle on first extra hole

=== Other wins (8) ===
No.	Date	Tournament	Winning score	Margin of victory	Runner(s)-up
1	Aug 22, 1987	Michelob Missouri Open	−12 (68-70-66=204)	4 strokes	(United States) Stan Utley
2	Feb 11, 1996	AT&T Australian Skins Game	$104,000	$76,000	(United States) Tom Watson
3	Dec 5, 1999	JCPenney Classic (with (England) Laura Davies)	−24 (63-66-67-64=260)	Playoff	(United States) Paul Azinger and (South Korea) Pak Se-ri
4	Nov 23, 2003	Callaway Golf Pebble Beach Invitational	−9 (69-68-73-69=279)	1 stroke	(United States) Jim Thorpe, (United States) Bo Van Pelt
5	Aug 8, 2006	Telus World Skins Game	$210,000	$115,000	(Canada) Stephen Ames
6	Jun 19, 2007	Telus World Skins Game (2)	$220,000	$95,000	(Australia) Geoff Ogilvy
7	Dec 6, 2014	Beko Classic	−15 (66-63-72=201)	1 stroke	(England) Robert Coles
8	Dec 19, 2021	PNC Championship (with son John Daly II)	−27 (60-57=117)	2 strokes	(United States) Tiger Woods and son Charlie Woods

Other playoff record (1–0)

No.	Year	Tournament	Opponents	Result
1	1999	JCPenney Classic (with (England) Laura Davies)	(United States) Paul Azinger and (South Korea) Pak Se-ri	Won with birdie on third extra hole

=== PGA Tour Champions wins (1) ===
No.	Date	Tournament	Winning score	Margin of victory	Runners-up
1	May 7, 2017	Insperity Invitational	−14 (68-65-69=202)	1 stroke	(United States) Tommy Armour III, (United States) Kenny Perry

== Major championships ==
=== Wins (2) ===
Year	Championship	54 holes	Winning score	Margin	Runner-up
1991	PGA Championship	3 shot lead	−12 (69-67-69-71=276)	3 strokes	(United States) Bruce Lietzke
1995	The Open Championship	4 shot deficit	−6 (67-71-73-71=282)	Playoff^{1}	(Italy) Costantino Rocca

^{1}Defeated Rocca in four-hole playoff; Daly (4-3-4-4=15), Rocca (5-4-7-3=19).

=== Results timeline ===
Results not in chronological order in 2020.

Tournament	1986	1987	1988	1989
Masters Tournament				
U.S. Open	CUT			T69
The Open Championship				
PGA Championship				

Tournament	1990	1991	1992	1993	1994	1995	1996	1997	1998	1999
Masters Tournament			T19	T3	T48	T45	T29		T33	T52
U.S. Open			CUT	T33	CUT	T45	T27	WD	T53	68
The Open Championship			75	T14	81	1	T67		CUT	
PGA Championship		1	82	T51	CUT	CUT	CUT	T29	CUT	

Tournament	2000	2001	2002	2003	2004	2005	2006	2007	2008	2009
Masters Tournament	CUT		T32		CUT	CUT	CUT			
U.S. Open	WD		T70			T75				
The Open Championship	CUT	CUT	CUT	T72	CUT	T15	CUT	CUT	CUT	T27
PGA Championship	CUT	CUT	CUT	CUT	CUT	T74	CUT	T32	CUT	WD

Tournament	2010	2011	2012	2013	2014	2015	2016	2017	2018
Masters Tournament									
U.S. Open									
The Open Championship	T48	CUT	T81		CUT	CUT	CUT	CUT	
PGA Championship	WD	CUT	T18		CUT	CUT	CUT	CUT	CUT

Tournament	2019	2020	2021	2022	2023	2024
Masters Tournament						
PGA Championship	CUT		CUT	CUT		WD
U.S. Open						
The Open Championship		NT		CUT	CUT	WD

Win
Top 10
Did not play

CUT = missed the half way cut
WD = withdrew
"T" indicates a tie for a place
NT = No tournament due to COVID-19 pandemic

=== Summary ===
Tournament	Wins	2nd	3rd	Top-5	Top-10	Top-25	Events	Cuts made
Masters Tournament	0	0	1	1	1	2	12	8
PGA Championship	1	0	0	1	1	2	30	7
U.S. Open	0	0	0	0	0	0	13	8
The Open Championship	1	0	0	1	1	3	26	10
Totals	2	0	1	3	3	7	80	33

- Most consecutive cuts made – 7 (1992 Open Championship – 1994 Masters)
- Longest streak of top-10s – 1 (three times)

== Results in The Players Championship ==
Tournament	1991	1992	1993	1994	1995	1996	1997	1998	1999	2000	2001	2002	2003	2004	2005	2006
The Players Championship	CUT	72	CUT	CUT		T19	WD	T16	WD	T48	CUT	CUT	T56	79	CUT	T45

Did not play

CUT = missed the halfway cut
WD = withdrew
"T" indicates a tie for a place

== Results in World Golf Championships ==
Tournament	2002	2003	2004	2005	2006
Match Play	R64			R32	R32
Championship				2	
Invitational	73		T43	27	

Top 10
Did not play

QF, R16, R32, R64 = Round in which player lost in match play
"T" = Tied

== Results in senior major championships ==
Results not in chronological order

Tournament	2016	2017	2018	2019	2020	2021	2022	2023	2024	2025	2026
Senior PGA Championship	CUT	T17		CUT	NT	CUT	WD	WD			CUT
The Tradition	T15	T32	WD		NT	T10	DQ	T65	T60	WD	71
U.S. Senior Open	CUT				NT						
Senior Players Championship	T49	T50	WD	T18	T70	75	WD	T53	T56	T63	WD
Senior British Open Championship	T54	T38	T50		NT				WD		

Top 10
Did not play

"T" indicates a tie for a place
CUT = missed the halfway cut
DQ = disqualified
WD = withdrew
NT = no tournament due to COVID-19 pandemic

== U.S. national team appearances ==
- Alfred Dunhill Cup: 1993 (winners), 1998, 2000
- World Cup: 1998
- Wendy's 3-Tour Challenge (representing PGA Tour): 1995, 2001, 2002 (winners), 2003 (winners), 2004, 2005

== See also ==
- 1990 PGA Tour Qualifying School graduates
- Monday Night Golf – American TV series (1999–2005)
