= 1996 World Cup of Golf =

Coordinates: 34.074°S 18.886°E

Tournament information
- Dates: 21–24 November
- Location: Somerset West, Cape Town, South Africa
- Course: Erinvale Country Club
- Format: 72 holes stroke play combined score

Statistics
- Par: 72
- Length: 7,002 yards (6,403 m)
- Field: 32 two-man teams
- Cut: None
- Prize fund: US$1,300,000 team US$200,000 individual
- Winner's share: US$400,000 team US$100,000 individual

Champion
- South Africa; Ernie Els & Wayne Westner
- 547 (−29)

The 1996 World Cup of Golf took place 21–24 November at the Erinvale Golf Club in Somerset West, Cape Town, South Africa. It was the 42nd World Cup. The tournament was a 72-hole stroke play team event (32 teams) with each team consisting of two players from a country. The combined score of each team determined the team results. Individuals also competed for the International Trophy. The prize money totaled $1,500,000 with $400,000 going to the winning pair and $100,000 to the top individual. The South African team of Ernie Els and Wayne Westner won by 18 strokes over the United States team of Steve Jones and Tom Lehman. Els took the International Trophy by three strokes over Westner. It was only the fourth time in the history of the World Cup, two players from the same squad finished first and second individually.

22 nations qualified automatically with the remaining 10 nations gaining entry through a qualifying tournament in Jamaica.

== Teams ==
| Country | Players |
|---|---|
| Argentina | Jorge Berendt and Ricardo González |
| Australia | Stuart Appleby and Bradley Hughes |
| Canada | Rick Gibson and Rick Todd |
| Chile | Guillermo Encina and Roy Mackenzie |
| China | Cheng Jun and Zhang Lianwei |
| Chinese Taipei | Chang Tse-Pen and Chen Liang-hsi |
| Colombia | Albert Evers and Rigoberto Velásquez |
| Czech Republic | Jiří Janda and Petr Mruzek |
| Denmark | Thomas Bjørn and Rene Budde |
| England | Peter Mitchell and Jim Payne |
| France | Marc Farry and Jean van de Velde |
| Germany | Alex Čejka and Bernhard Langer |
| Hong Kong | Derek Fung and Tang Man Kee |
| Ireland | Darren Clarke and Pádraig Harrington |
| Italy | Costantino Rocca and Manny Zerman |
| Jamaica | Delroy Cambridge and Seymour Rose |
| Japan | Katsunori Kuwabara and Tsuneyuki Nakajima |
| Mexico | Rafael Alarcón and César Pérez |
| Namibia | Trevor Dodds and Schalk van der Merwe |
| New Zealand | Paul Devenport and Phil Tataurangi |
| Paraguay | Nelson Cabrera and Felix Ramon Franco |
| Puerto Rico | Wilfredo Morales and Miguel Suárez |
| Scotland | Andrew Coltart and Paul Lawrie |
| South Africa | Ernie Els and Wayne Westner |
| Spain | Diego Borrego and Ignacio Garrido |
| Sri Lanka | Tissa Chandradasa and Nandasena Perera |
| Sweden | Jarmo Sandelin and Patrik Sjöland |
| Switzerland | André Bossert and Paolo Quirici |
| United States | Steve Jones and Tom Lehman |
| Venezuela | Henrique Lavie and Federico Sauce |
| Wales | Mark Mouland and Ian Woosnam |
| Zimbabwe | Tony Johnstone and Mark McNulty |

== Scores ==
Team

| Place | Country | Score | To par | Money (US$) (per team) |
|---|---|---|---|---|
| 1 | South Africa | 136-144-130-137=547 | −29 | 400,000 |
| 2 | United States | 146-140-140-139=565 | −11 | 200,000 |
| 3 | Scotland | 139-142-142-143=566 | −10 | 125,000 |
| 4 | Germany | 145-144-140-142=571 | −5 | 100,000 |
| 5 | France | 144-141-144-143=572 | −4 | 80,000 |
| T6 | Argentina | 142-147-140-150=579 | +3 | 52,500 |
| T6 | Denmark | 138-147-152-142=579 | +3 | 52,500 |
| T8 | Italy | 143-149-147-141=580 | +4 | 28,000 |
| T8 | Namibia | 146-146-143-145=580 | +4 | 28,000 |
| T8 | Wales | 143-149-143-145=580 | +4 | 28,000 |
| T11 | Canada | 145-142-146-148=581 | +5 | 18,500 |
| T11 | Zimbabwe | 151-147-144-139=581 | +5 | 18,500 |
| 13 | Sweden | 149-140-146-148=583 | +7 | 15,000 |
| T14 | Australia | 149-145-147-143=584 | +8 | 11,332 |
| T14 | Mexico | 148-143-149-144=584 | +8 | 11,332 |
| T14 | Spain | 145-151-148-140=584 | +8 | 11,332 |
| T17 | Colombia | 143-147-145-150=585 | +9 | 8,900 |
| T17 | Switzerland | 145-146-150-144=585 | +9 | 8,900 |
| 19 | Ireland | 145-150-149-142=586 | +10 | 8,500 |
| T20 | China | 142-145-152-148=587 | +11 | 8,300 |
| T20 | Japan | 152-149-146-140=587 | +11 | 8,300 |
| 22 | England | 149-151-143-145=588 | +12 | 8,000 |
| 23 | Chinese Taipei | 146-152-151-145=594 | +18 | 7,800 |
| 24 | New Zealand | 147-151-146-153=597 | +21 | 7,600 |
| T25 | Jamaica | 154-152-152-147=605 | +29 | 7,300 |
| T25 | Sri Lanka | 159-150-150-146=605 | +29 | 7,300 |
| 27 | Puerto Rico | 150-156-152-148=606 | +30 | 7,000 |
| 28 | Paraguay | 149-148-152-159=608 | +32 | 6,800 |
| 29 | Czech Republic | 149-157-156-150=612 | +36 | 6,600 |
| 30 | Hong Kong | 154-157-154-158=623 | +47 | 6,400 |
| 31 | Venezuela | 157-164-148-158=627 | +51 | 6,000 |
| DQ | Chile | | | |

International Trophy

| Place | Player | Country | Score | To par | Money (US$) |
|---|---|---|---|---|---|
| 1 | Ernie Els | South Africa | 68-72-65-67=272 | −16 | 100,000 |
| 2 | Wayne Westner | South Africa | 68-72-65-70=275 | −13 | 50,000 |
| 3 | Bernhard Langer | Germany | 71-68-72-69=280 | −8 | 25,000 |
| T4 | Paul Lawrie | Scotland | 69-70-70-72=281 | −7 | 12,500 |
| T4 | Ian Woosnam | Wales | 70-73-67-71=281 | −7 | 12,500 |
| 5 | Steve Jones | United States | 73-70-70-69=282 | −6 | |
| T6 | Tom Lehman | United States | 73-70-70-70=283 | −5 | |
| T6 | Costantino Rocca | Italy | 71-71-72-69=283 | −5 | |
| 8 | Ricardo Gonzalez | Argentina | 71-73-68-72=284 | −4 | |
| T9 | Stuart Appleby | Australia | 74-71-70-70=285 | −3 | |
| T9 | Thomas Bjørn | Denmark | 67-74-76-68=285 | −3 | |
| T9 | Andrew Coltart | Scotland | 70-72-72-71=285 | −3 | |
