= Costantino Rocca =

Italian golfer (born 1956)

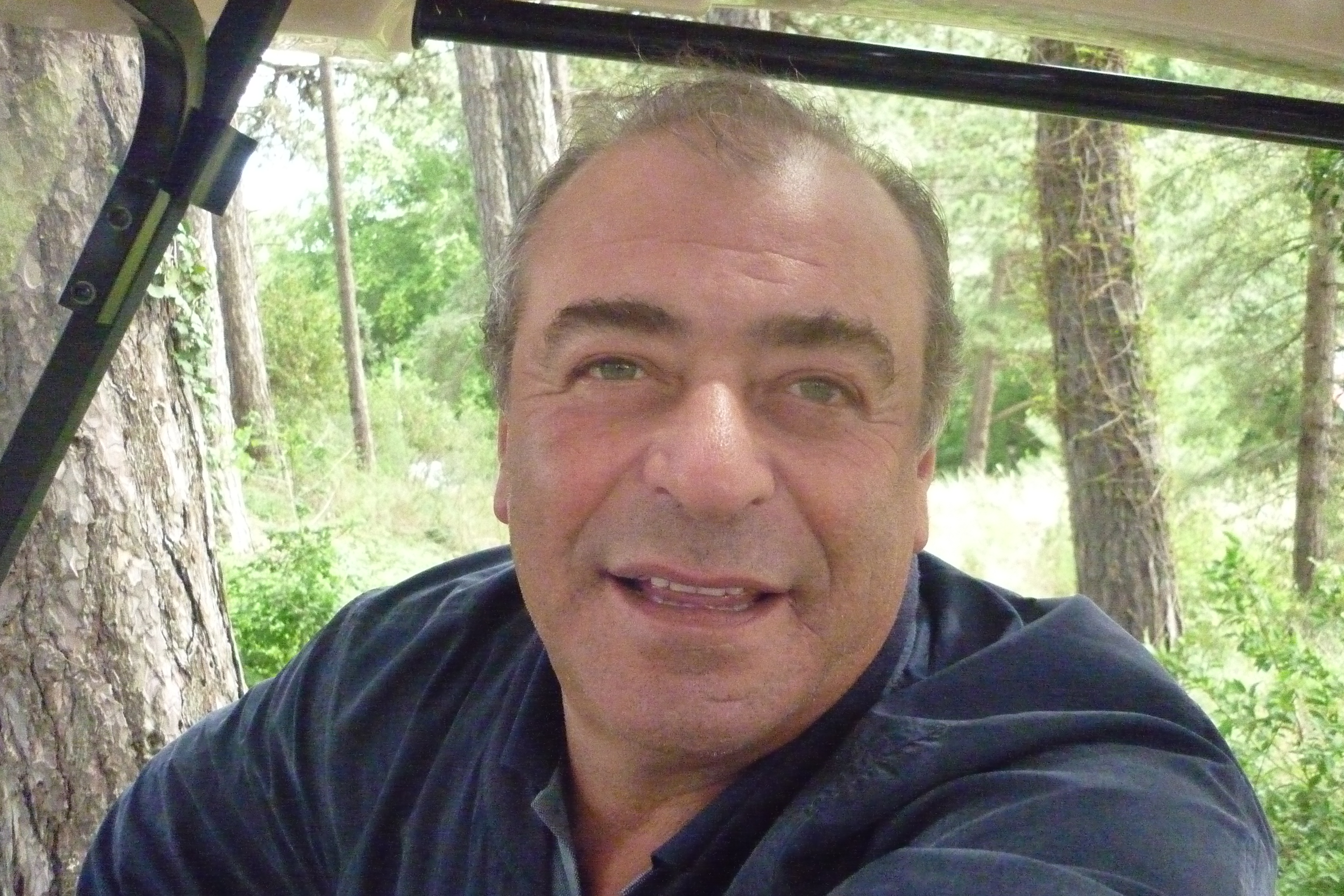

Personal information
- Nationality: Italy
- Born: 4 December 1956 (age 69) Bergamo, Italy
- Height: 1.75 m (5 ft 9 in)
- Spouse: Antonella (m. 1981)
- Children: 2

Career
- Sport: Golf
- Turned professional: 1981
- Current tour: European Seniors Tour
- Former tours: European Tour; Challenge Tour
- Professional wins: 17
- Highest ranking: 18 (26 May 1996)

Number of wins by tour
- European Tour: 5
- Challenge Tour: 2
- European Senior Tour: 2
- Other: 9

Best results in major championships
- Masters Tournament: T5: 1997
- PGA Championship: T17: 1995
- U.S. Open: T67: 1996
- The Open Championship: 2nd: 1995

Achievements and awards
- European Seniors Tour Rookie of the Year: 2007

Costantino Rocca (born 4 December 1956) is an Italian golfer. He was long known as the most successful male golfer that Italy has produced, until the 2018 success of Francesco Molinari, who credited Rocca as an inspiration to him following his Open victory. After a long career on the European Tour, Constantino is now playing on the European Seniors Tour. He has five European Tour wins and is best known for his second-place finish in the 1995 Open Championship, and his hole in one in 1995 Ryder Cup.

== Early life ==
In 1956, Rocca was born in Almenno San Bartolomeo, Bergamo. Rocca began his career as a caddie. In 1978, He won the Italian Caddie Championship.

== Professional career ==
In 1981, at the age of 24, he turned professional. In the 1980s, Rocca struggled to retain a European Tour card and made several trips to the Qualifying School. He began to make major strides in his career in 1990, which was the first season that he finished high enough on the Order of Merit to retain membership. By 1993, he had risen to sixth in the Order of Merit. His two best seasons were 1995 and 1996, when he finished fourth. He won five titles on the tour, the first of which was the 1993 Open de Lyon and the most prestigious of which was the 1996 Volvo PGA Championship.

Rocca is best known for his performance at the 1995 Open Championship. He holed a 60-foot (18-metre) putt on the 18th at St Andrews to make birdie and force a four-hole playoff with John Daly but Daly won the playoff by four strokes. Rocca's second-highest finish in a major was a tie for fifth in the 1997 Masters Tournament; he was in the final pairing on Sunday, having begun the final round in second place, nine shots behind 21-year-old Tiger Woods, and he finished fifteen behind Woods.

Rocca was the first Italian to play for Europe in the Ryder Cup, and remained the only Italian to do so until 2010, when Francesco Molinari qualified for the Ryder Cup held in Celtic Manor and Edoardo Molinari was a captain's pick. He appeared in 1993, 1995 and 1997, and had a 6–5–0 win–loss–half record, including 1 win and 2 losses in singles matches. That one singles win came in a crucial match against Tiger Woods in the 1997 Ryder Cup at Valderrama, which Rocca won 4 & 2 to help Europe claim the cup. The victory against Woods was one of Woods' first losses in singles play. His 53% winning record in the Cup is one of the best in European team history. During the 1995 Ryder Cup, Rocca made a hole-in-one on Oak Hill's sixth hole, only the third ace in Ryder Cup history. In 1999, Rocca almost qualified for the Ryder Cup again after he won the West of Ireland Golf Classic.

The 2001 European Tour season was the last in which Rocca finished inside the top hundred on the Order of Merit, though he remained exempt through 2006 due to his 1996 Volvo PGA Championship win. He made his European Seniors Tour debut at the 2007 Sharp Italian Seniors Open, and won his first senior tournament two weeks later at the Irish Seniors Open. He ended 2008 with a record seven top finishes and ranked ninth in the Order of Merit. His best placing was tied third in the Azores Senior Open.

In 2008, Rocca opened his own golf academy, the Costantino Rocca Golf Academy, at Golf Club Gerre Losone in Switzerland.

Rocca played his last European Tour event in 2015 at the Italian Open, an event he played in 33 times but never won.

== Personal life ==
Rocca is married and has two children, Francesco and Chiara.

He is friends with golfing great Gary Player and has played in his Gary Player Invitational charity event to help raise money for underprivileged children around the world.

== Professional wins (17) ==
=== European Tour wins (5) ===
Legend
Flagship events (1)
Other European Tour (4)

No.	Date	Tournament	Winning score	Margin of victory	Runner(s)-up
1	4 Apr 1993	Open de Lyon	−21 (67-71-66-63=267)	6 strokes	(Sweden) Joakim Haeggman, (Sweden) Gabriel Hjertstedt, (England) Barry Lane, (Republic of Ireland) Paul McGinley
2	27 Jun 1993	Peugeot Open de France	−11 (66-66-71-70=273)	Playoff	(Republic of Ireland) Paul McGinley
3	27 May 1996	Volvo PGA Championship	−14 (69-67-69-69=274)	2 strokes	(England) Nick Faldo, (Scotland) Paul Lawrie
4	7 Sep 1997	Canon European Masters	−13 (71-69-70-65=275)	1 stroke	(Scotland) Scott Henderson, (Sweden) Robert Karlsson
5	15 Aug 1999	West of Ireland Golf Classic^{1}	−12 (70-68-68-70=276)	2 strokes	(Republic of Ireland) Pádraig Harrington

^{1}Dual-ranking event with the Challenge Tour

European Tour playoff record (1–1)

No.	Year	Tournament	Opponent	Result
1	1993	Peugeot Open de France	(Republic of Ireland) Paul McGinley	Won with bogey on the first extra hole
2	1995	The Open Championship	(United States) John Daly	Lost four-hole aggregate playoff; Daly: −1 (4-3-4-4=15), Rocca: +3 (5-4-7-3=19)

=== Challenge Tour wins (2) ===
No.	Date	Tournament	Winning score	Margin of victory	Runner-up
1	22 Apr 1989	Open Index	−13 (275)	3 strokes	(England) Neal Briggs
2	15 Aug 1999	West of Ireland Golf Classic^{1}	−12 (70-68-68-70=276)	2 strokes	(Republic of Ireland) Pádraig Harrington

^{1}Dual-ranking event with the European Tour

=== Other wins (6) ===
- 1984 Nazionale Open
- 1985 Enichem Open
- 1986 Pinetina Open
- 1988 Rolex Pro-Am (Switzerland)
- 1989 Nazionale Open, Italian PGA Championship

=== European Seniors Tour wins (2) ===
Legend
Tour Championships (1)
Other European Seniors Tour (1)

No.	Date	Tournament	Winning score	Margin of victory	Runner(s)-up
1	3 Jun 2007	AIB Irish Seniors Open	−5 (69-71-71=211)	2 strokes	(Spain) Juan Quirós, (England) Kevin Spurgeon
2	10 Nov 2007	The Kingdom of Bahrain Trophy Seniors Tour Championship	−10 (70-70-66=206)	1 stroke	(England) Nick Job

European Seniors Tour playoff record (0–1)

No.	Year	Tournament	Opponent	Result
1	2007	European Senior Masters	(England) Carl Mason	Lost to birdie on first extra hole

=== Other senior wins (3) ===
- 2008 Senior Italian PGA Championship
- 2010 Senior Italian PGA Championship
- 2011 Senior Italian PGA Championship

== Playoff record ==
PGA Tour playoff record (0–1)

No.	Year	Tournament	Opponent	Result
1	1995	The Open Championship	(United States) John Daly	Lost four-hole aggregate playoff; Daly: −1 (4-3-4-4=15), Rocca: +3 (5-4-7-3=19)

PGA of Japan Tour playoff record (0–1)

No.	Year	Tournament	Opponents	Result
1	1996	Sumitomo Visa Taiheiyo Masters	(United States) Jeff Sluman, (England) Lee Westwood	Westwood won with par on fourth extra hole Sluman eliminated by birdie on first hole

== Results in major championships ==
Tournament	1991	1992	1993	1994	1995	1996	1997	1998	1999
Masters Tournament				T41		CUT	T5	CUT	
U.S. Open				CUT		T67		CUT	
The Open Championship	T44	T55	CUT	CUT	2	T64	CUT	T9	T18
PGA Championship				CUT	T17	T52	T71	CUT	

Top 10
Did not play

CUT = missed the half-way cut
"T" = tied

=== Summary ===
Tournament	Wins	2nd	3rd	Top-5	Top-10	Top-25	Events	Cuts made
Masters Tournament	0	0	0	1	1	1	4	2
U.S. Open	0	0	0	0	0	0	3	1
The Open Championship	0	1	0	1	2	3	9	6
PGA Championship	0	0	0	0	0	1	5	3
Totals	0	1	0	2	3	5	21	12

- Most consecutive cuts made – 4 (1996 U.S. Open – 1997 Masters)
- Longest streak of top-10s – 1 (three times)

== Results in The Players Championship ==
Tournament	1996	1997	1998
The Players Championship	CUT	T43	CUT

CUT = missed the halfway cut
"T" indicates a tie for a place

== Team appearances ==
- Hennessy Cognac Cup (representing Italy): 1984
- Alfred Dunhill Cup (representing Italy): 1986, 1987, 1989, 1991, 1992, 1996, 1999
- Europcar Cup (representing Italy): 1988
- World Cup (representing Italy): 1988, 1990, 1991, 1992, 1993, 1994, 1995, 1996, 1998, 1999
- Ryder Cup (representing Europe): 1993, 1995 (winners), 1997 (winners)
