= 1991 Dunhill Cup =

Coordinates: 56.351484°N 2.816147°W

Tournament information
- Dates: 10–13 October
- Location: St Andrews, Scotland
- Course(s): Old Course at St Andrews
- Format: Match play

Statistics
- Par: 72
- Length: 6,933 yards (6,340 m)
- Field: 16 teams of 3 players
- Prize fund: US$1,700,000
- Winner's share: US$510,000

Champion
- Sweden (Anders Forsbrand, Per-Ulrik Johansson, Mats Lanner)

The 1991 Dunhill Cup was the seventh Dunhill Cup. It was a team tournament featuring 16 countries, each represented by three players. The Cup was played 10–13 October at the Old Course at St Andrews in Scotland. The sponsor was the Alfred Dunhill company. The Swedish team of Anders Forsbrand, Per-Ulrik Johansson, and Mats Lanner beat the South African team of John Bland, David Frost, and Gary Player in the final. The final match was scheduled to consist of six individual matches (as in 1989 and 1990) but was reduced to three matches (as from 1985 to 1988) due to weather.

== Format ==
The Cup was played as a single-elimination, match play event played over four days. The top eight teams were seeded with the remaining teams randomly placed in the bracket. In each match, the three players were paired with their opponents and played 18 holes at medal match play. Tied matches were extended to a sudden-death playoff only if they affected the outcome between the two teams.

== Bracket ==
First round
1	United States	2
South Korea	1
8	South Africa	2
Switzerland	1
5	Scotland	2
Italy	1
4	Ireland	3
Paraguay	0
2	Australia	1
Canada	2
7	Spain	1
Wales	2
6	Sweden	2
Taiwan	1
3	England	3
Thailand	0

Quarter-finals
1	United States	1
8	South Africa	2
5	Scotland	3
4	Ireland	0
Canada	1
Wales	2
6	Sweden	2.5
3	England	0.5

Semi-finals
8	South Africa	3
5	Scotland	0
Wales	1
6	Sweden	2

Final
8	South Africa	1
6	Sweden	2
Third place
5	Scotland	2.5
Wales	0.5

== Round by round scores ==
=== First round ===
Australia – 1		Canada – 2	
Player	Score	Player	Score
Mike Harwood	73	Danny Mijovic	71
Craig Parry	70	Dan Halldorson	75
Wayne Grady	71	Dave Barr	70

South Africa – 2		Switzerland – 1	
Player	Score	Player	Score
David Frost	69	André Bossert	73
John Bland	74	Paolo Quirici	74
Gary Player	76	Karim Baradia	75

Bland won on the third playoff hole.

England – 3		Thailand – 0	
Player	Score	Player	Score
Paul Broadhurst	70	Sukree Oncham	77
Nick Faldo	69	Thaworn Wiratchant	75
Steven Richardson	71	Boonchu Ruangkit	77

Ireland – 3		Paraguay – 0	
Player	Score	Player	Score
Ronan Rafferty	70	Carlos Franco	74
David Feherty	75	Pedro Martínez	77
Eamonn Darcy	75	Ángel Franco	77

United States – 2		South Korea – 1	
Player	Score	Player	Score
Steve Pate	70	Park Nam-Sin	71
Curtis Strange	74	Choi Sang-Ho	72
Fred Couples	71	Lee Kang-Sun	76

Scotland – 2		Italy – 1	
Player	Score	Player	Score
Sam Torrance	74	Costantino Rocca	72
Gordon Brand Jnr	74	Alberto Binaghi	74
Colin Montgomerie	67	Giuseppe Calì	71

Brand won on the fifth playoff hole.

Wales – 2		Spain – 1	
Player	Score	Player	Score
Ian Woosnam	70	Santiago Luna	70
Philip Parkin	74	José Rivero	71
Phillip Price	73	Miguel Ángel Martín	74

Woosnam won on the second playoff hole.

Sweden – 2		Taiwan – 1	
Player	Score	Player	Score
Per-Ulrik Johansson	74	Wang Ter-chang	72
Mats Lanner	73	Chung Chun-hsing	77
Anders Forsbrand	72	Yu Chin-Han	82

=== Quarter-finals ===
United States – 1		South Africa – 2	
Player	Score	Player	Score
Curtis Strange	69	John Bland	68
Steve Pate	71	David Frost	70
Fred Couples	67	Gary Player	74

Ireland – 0		Scotland – 3	
Player	Score	Player	Score
Ronan Rafferty	72	Sam Torrance	68
Eamonn Darcy	72	Gordon Brand Jnr	71
David Feherty	74	Colin Montgomerie	73

England – 0.5		Sweden – 2.5	
Player	Score	Player	Score
Nick Faldo	74	Per-Ulrik Johansson	73
Paul Broadhurst	70	Mats Lanner	70
Steven Richardson	70	Anders Forsbrand	69

Wales – 2		Canada – 1	
Player	Score	Player	Score
Phillip Price	69	Danny Mijovic	70
Philip Parkin	69	Dave Barr	68
Ian Woosnam	67	Dan Halldorson	70

=== Semi-finals ===
Scotland – 0		South Africa – 3	
Player	Score	Player	Score
Sam Torrance	70	David Frost	64
Gordon Brand Jnr	74	Gary Player	70
Colin Montgomerie	72	John Bland	69

Sweden – 2		Wales – 1	
Player	Score	Player	Score
Per-Ulrik Johansson	68	Ian Woosnam	65
Anders Forsbrand	68	Philip Parkin	68
Mats Lanner	71	Phillip Price	71

Forsbrand won in a playoff.
Lanner won on the fifth playoff hole.

=== Final ===
Sweden – 2		South Africa – 1	
Player	Score	Player	Score
Anders Forsbrand	68	John Bland	69
Per-Ulrik Johansson	74	David Frost	68
Mats Lanner	74	Gary Player	74

Lanner won on the first playoff hole.

=== Third place ===
Scotland – 2.5		Wales – 0.5	
Player	Score	Player	Score
Sam Torrance	70	Ian Woosnam	71
Colin Montgomerie	69	Philip Parkin	70
Gordon Brand Jnr	69	Phillip Price	69

== Team results ==
Country	Place	W	L	Seed
Sweden	1	8.5	3.5	6
South Africa	2	8	4	8
Scotland	3	7.5	4.5	5
Wales	4	5.5	6.5	
England	T5	3.5	2.5	3
Canada	T5	3	3	
Ireland	T5	3	3	4
United States	T5	3	3	1
Australia	T9	1	2	2
Italy	T9	1	2	
South Korea	T9	1	2	
Spain	T9	1	2	7
Switzerland	T9	1	2	
Taiwan	T9	1	2	
Paraguay	T9	0	3	
Thailand	T9	0	3	

== Player results ==
Country	Player	W	L
Sweden	Anders Forsbrand	4	0
Sweden	Mats Lanner	3.5	0.5
Sweden	Per-Ulrik Johansson	1	3
South Africa	David Frost	4	0
South Africa	John Bland	3	1
South Africa	Gary Player	1	3
Scotland	Colin Montgomerie	3	1
Scotland	Gordon Brand Jnr	2.5	1.5
Scotland	Sam Torrance	2	2
Wales	Ian Woosnam	3	1
Wales	Phillip Price	1.5	2.5
Wales	Philip Parkin	1	3
England	Paul Broadhurst	1.5	0.5
England	Nick Faldo	1	1
England	Steven Richardson	1	1
Canada	Dave Barr	2	0
Canada	Danny Mijovic	1	1
Canada	Dan Halldorson	0	2
Ireland	Eamonn Darcy	1	1
Ireland	David Feherty	1	1
Ireland	Ronan Rafferty	1	1
United States	Fred Couples	2	0
United States	Steve Pate	1	1
United States	Curtis Strange	0	2
Australia	Craig Parry	1	0
Australia	Wayne Grady	0	1
Australia	Mike Harwood	0	1
Italy	Costantino Rocca	1	0
Italy	Alberto Binaghi	0	1
Italy	Giuseppe Calì	0	1
South Korea	Choi Sang-Ho	1	0
South Korea	Lee Kang-Sun	0	1
South Korea	Park Nam-Sin	0	1
Spain	José Rivero	1	0
Spain	Santiago Luna	0	1
Spain	Miguel Ángel Martín	0	1
Switzerland	Karim Baradia	1	0
Switzerland	André Bossert	0	1
Switzerland	Paolo Quirici	0	1
Taiwan	Wang Ter-chang	1	0
Taiwan	Chung Chun-hsing	0	1
Taiwan	Yu Chin-Han	0	1
Paraguay	Ángel Franco	0	1
Paraguay	Carlos Franco	0	1
Paraguay	Pedro Martínez	0	1
Thailand	Sukree Oncham	0	1
Thailand	Boonchu Ruangkit	0	1
Thailand	Thaworn Wiratchant	0	1
