= 2007 Open Championship =

Tournament information
- Dates: 19–22 July 2007
- Location: Angus, Scotland; 56.497°N 2.717°W
- Courses: Carnoustie Golf Links; Championship Course
- Organized by: The R&A
- Tours: European Tour; PGA Tour; Japan Golf Tour

Statistics
- Par: 71
- Length: 7,421 yards (6,786 m)
- Field: 156 players, 70 after cut
- Cut: 146 (+4)
- Prize fund: £4,200,000 €6,158,474 $8,637,720
- Winner's share: £750,000 €1,106,618 $1,542,450

Champion
- (Republic of Ireland) Pádraig Harrington
- 277 (−7), playoff
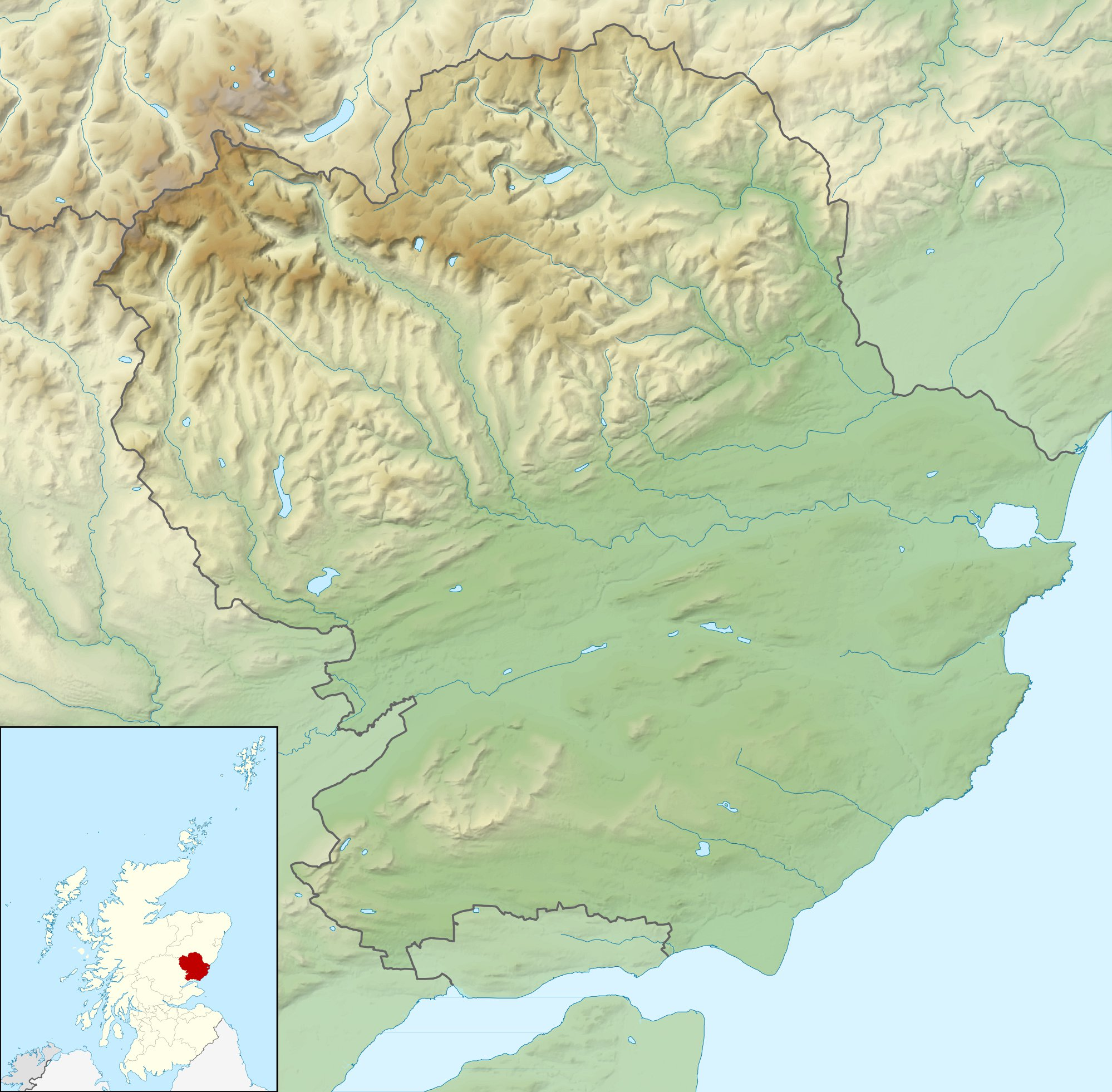
- Location in Scotland Location in Angus, Scotland

The 2007 Open Championship was a men's major golf championship and the 136th Open Championship, played from 19–22 July at Carnoustie Golf Links in Scotland. Pádraig Harrington defeated Sergio García in a playoff to take the title and his first major championship.

A field of 156 players participated in the championship, and the purse was £4.2 million (an increase of £200,000 over 2006); the winner received £750,000 (an increase of £30,000 over 2006). Using conversion rates at the time of the tournament, the purse was €6,158,474 for the European Tour's Order of Merit rankings and US$8,637,720 for the PGA Tour's money list.

== History of The Open Championship at Carnoustie ==
Carnoustie hosted its first Open Championship in 1931 and the 2007 Open was the seventh to be held at Carnoustie, and third consecutive to end in a playoff. Carnoustie's prestige in the golf community is irrefutable as the list of champions includes Tommy Armour (1931), Henry Cotton (1937), Ben Hogan (1953), Gary Player (1968), Tom Watson (1975) and Paul Lawrie (1999).

The 1999 championship was nicknamed "Carnastie" due to how difficult the course and conditions were. Jean van de Velde stood on the 72nd tee with a three-shot lead, needing only a double-bogey to win. He memorably triple-bogeyed the hole and went to a four-hole playoff with Lawrie and Justin Leonard, in which Lawrie prevailed. Watson's win in 1975, his first of five Open Championships (and eight majors), came after an 18-hole Sunday playoff with Jack Newton.

== Course layout ==
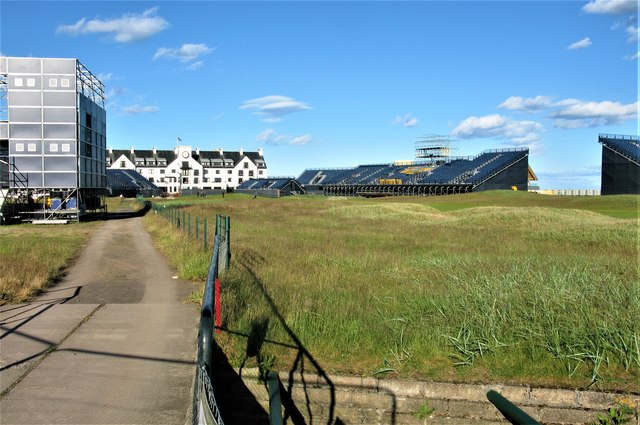
The 18th hole on the Championship Golf Course

Carnoustie Golf Links – Championship Course

Hole	Name	Yards	Par	Hole	Name	Yards	Par
1	Cup	406	4	10	South America	466	4
2	Gulley	463	4	11	Dyke	383	4
3	Jockie's Burn	358	4	12	Southward Ho	499	4
4	Hillocks	412	4	13	Whins	176	3
5	Brae	415	4	14	Spectacles	514	5
6	Hogan's Alley ^	578	5	15	Lucky Slap	472	4
7	Plantation	410	4	16	Barry Burn	248	3
8	Short	183	3	17	Island	461	4
9	Railway	478	4	18	Home	499	4
Out		3,703	36	In		3,718	35
				Total		7,421	71

^ the 6th hole was named Long until 2003

Lengths of the course for previous Opens:

- 1999: 7,361 yards (6,731 m), par 71
- 1975: 7,065 yards (6,460 m), par 72
- 1968: 7,252 yards (6,631 m), par 72
- 1953: 7,200 yards (6,585 m), par 72
- 1937: 7,200 yards (6,585 m), par 72
- 1931: 6,701 yards (6,127 m), par 72

== Field ==
The field consisted of 156 golfers. Seventy players made the 36-hole cut at 146 (+4) or better.

1. First 10 and anyone tying for 10th place in the 2006 Open Championship
Ángel Cabrera (3,4,5,9), Chris DiMarco (3,17), Ernie Els (2,3,4), Jim Furyk (3,9,13,17,21), Sergio García (3,4,17), Carl Pettersson (3,13), Andrés Romero, Adam Scott (3,13), Hideto Tanihara, Tiger Woods (2,3,10,11,13,17)

2. Past Open Champions aged 65 or under
Mark Calcavecchia, Ben Curtis, John Daly, Nick Faldo, Todd Hamilton, Tony Jacklin, Paul Lawrie, Tom Lehman, Justin Leonard, Sandy Lyle, Mark O'Meara

- Eligible but not competing: Ian Baker-Finch, Seve Ballesteros, David Duval, Johnny Miller, Greg Norman, Nick Price, Bill Rogers, Tom Watson, Tom Weiskopf

3. The first 50 players on the Official World Golf Rankings for 28 May 2007
Robert Allenby, Stephen Ames (12), Stuart Appleby (13), Aaron Baddeley, Chad Campbell (13,17), Paul Casey (4,17), K. J. Choi, Stewart Cink (13,17), Luke Donald (4,13,17), Joe Durant (13), Niclas Fasth (4), Retief Goosen (4,9,13), Anders Hansen (5), Pádraig Harrington (4,17), Charles Howell III, David Howell (4,5,17), Trevor Immelman (13), Zach Johnson (10,17), Robert Karlsson (4,17), Davis Love III (13), Phil Mickelson (10,11,12,13,17), Colin Montgomerie (4,17), Arron Oberholser, Geoff Ogilvy (9,13), Nick O'Hern (19), Rod Pampling (13), Ian Poulter (4), John Rollins, Justin Rose, Rory Sabbatini (13), Charl Schwartzel (4,20), Vijay Singh (11,13), Henrik Stenson (4,17), Richard Sterne, Steve Stricker, Vaughn Taylor (17), David Toms (13,17), Scott Verplank (17), Mike Weir (10), Lee Westwood (17), Brett Wetterich (13,17)

- Eligible but not competing: Tim Clark, José María Olazábal (17)

4. First 20 in the European Tour Final Order of Merit for 2006
John Bickerton, Thomas Bjørn, Paul Broadhurst, Johan Edfors, Jeev Milkha Singh (18), Anthony Wall

5. The BMW PGA Championship winners for 2005-2007

6. Top three players, not otherwise exempt, in the top 20 of the 2007 European Tour Order of Merit through 27 May
Markus Brier, Raphaël Jacquelin, Yang Yong-eun

7. Top two players, not otherwise exempt, with the most European Tour prize money from the Italian Open through the French Open, including the U. S. Open
Bradley Dredge, Graeme Storm

8. The leading player, not exempt having applied above, in the first 5 and ties of each of the 2007 European Open and the 2007 Barclays Scottish Open.
Pelle Edberg, Grégory Havret

9. The U.S. Open Champions for 2003–2007
Michael Campbell

10. The U.S. Masters Champions for 2003–2007

11. The U.S. PGA Champions for 2002–2006
Rich Beem, Shaun Micheel

12. The Players Champions for 2005–2007

- Eligible but not competing: Fred Funk

13. Top 20 on the Official Money List of the 2006 PGA Tour
Brett Quigley

14. First 3 and anyone tying for 3rd place, not exempt having applied above, in the top 20 of the Official Money List of the 2007 PGA Tour on completion of the Crowne Plaza Invitational at Colonial
Nick Watney, Boo Weekley

15. First 2 PGA Tour members and any PGA Tour members tying for 2nd place, not exempt, in a cumulative money list taken from The Players Championship and the five PGA Tour events leading up to and including the 2007 AT&T National
Hunter Mahan

- Eligible but not competing: Woody Austin

16. The leading player, not exempt having applied above, in the first 5 and ties of each of the 2007 AT&T National and the 2007 John Deere Classic
Pat Perez, Jonathan Byrd

17. Playing members of the 2006 Ryder Cup teams
Darren Clarke, J. J. Henry, Paul McGinley

18. Winner of the Order of Merit of the Asian Tour for 2006

19. First 2 on the Order of Merit of the PGA Tour of Australasia for 2006
Kevin Stadler

20. Winner of the Order of Merit of the Sunshine Tour for 2006/07

21. The Canadian Open Champion for 2006

22. The Japan Open Champion for 2006
Paul Sheehan

23. First 2 on the Official Money List of the Japan Golf Tour for 2006
Toru Taniguchi

- Eligible but not competing: Shingo Katayama

24. The leading 4 players, not exempt, in the 2007 Mizuno Open Yomiuri Classic
Lee Dong-hwan, Lee Seong-ho, Toshinori Muto, Achi Sato

25. First 2 and anyone tying for 2nd place, not exempt having applied (24) above, in a cumulative money list taken from all official Japan Golf Tour events from the 2007 Japan PGA Championship up to and including the 2007 Mizuno Open Yomiuri Classic
Tomohiro Kondo, Toshimitsu Izawa

26. The Senior British Open Champion for 2006
Loren Roberts

27. The 2007 Amateur Champion
Drew Weaver (a)

28. The U.S. Amateur Champion for 2006
Richie Ramsay (a)

29. The European Individual Amateur Champion for 2006
Rory McIlroy (a)

International Final Qualifying

Africa: Desvonde Botes, Adilson da Silva, Doug McGuigan, Terry Pilkadaris
Australasia: Ben Bunny, Peter Fowler, Scott Laycock, Ewan Porter
Asia: Ross Bain, David Gleeson, Adam Groom, Lam Chih Bing, Won Joon Lee
America: Brian Davis, Mark Hensby, Charley Hoffman, Anders Hultman, Jerry Kelly, Matt Kuchar, Spencer Levin, Ryan Moore, Sean O'Hair, Michael Putnam, John Senden, Duffy Waldorf
Europe: Fredrik Andersson Hed, Benn Barham, Grégory Bourdy, Peter Baker, Nick Dougherty, Mattias Eliasson, Ross Fisher, Alastair Forsyth, Mark Foster, David Frost, Peter Hanson, Miguel Ángel Jiménez, José-Filipe Lima, Graeme McDowell, Francesco Molinari, Oliver Wilson

Local Final Qualifying (Monday 9 July and Tuesday 10 July)

Downfield: Jon Bevan, Scott Drummond, David Higgins
Monifieth: Dave Coupland (a), Paul Waring (a), Llewellyn Matthews (a)
Montrose: Justin Kehoe, David Shacklady, Matthew Zions
Panmure: Kevin Harper, Steven Alker, Steve Parry

Alternates

- Richard Green – took spot not taken by Woody Austin
- Lucas Glover – replaced Shingo Katayama
- Tom Pernice Jr. – replaced José María Olazábal

== Round summaries ==
=== First round ===
Thursday, 19 July 2007

Sergio García led the field with a six-under 65; eight years earlier in 1999, he shot 89 in the opening round at Carnoustie and missed the cut by eighteen strokes. Amateur Rory McIlroy had the only bogey-free round on the day at 68 (−3); he qualified for the Open by winning the European Amateur Championship in 2006.

Tiger Woods began his campaign for a third straight Open Championship with a 69 (−2), including an eagle at Hogan's Alley, the famous 6th hole at Carnoustie. Paul McGinley was bogey-free until the 15th and 16th holes and carded a 67. John Daly suffered an incredible swoon, scoring −5 after three birdies and an eagle on 11, then had a double bogey at 12, triple bogey at 14, and three more bogeys on the way to a 74 (+3) for the round and went on to miss the cut. The scoring average on the day was 73.72 (+2.72).

Place	Player	Score	To par
1	(Spain) Sergio García	65	−6
2	(Republic of Ireland) Paul McGinley	67	−4
T3	(Austria) Markus Brier	68	−3
T3	(Argentina) Ángel Cabrera	68	−3
T3	(New Zealand) Michael Campbell	68	−3
T3	(Northern Ireland) Rory McIlroy (a)	68	−3
T3	(United States) Boo Weekley	68	−3
T8	(South Korea) K. J. Choi	69	−2
T8	(United States) Stewart Cink	69	−2
T8	(Republic of Ireland) Pádraig Harrington	69	−2
T8	(Spain) Miguel Ángel Jiménez	69	−2
T8	(United States) Tiger Woods	69	−2

=== Second round ===
Friday, 20 July 2007

First round leader Sergio García shot a level par 71 to stay at −6 and led by two strokes. Rory McIlroy shot a 76 (+5) to drop to +2, tied for 31st going into the weekend. Paul McGinley's 75 (+4) dropped him to even par after starting the day in second place. Tiger Woods had a disappointing 74 (+3) which started with a double bogey on the first hole. Mike Weir shot the best round of the day with a 68 (−3), which moved him into a tie for third place. The 36-hole cut fluctuated until it settled at +4, and the scoring average for the second round was 74.10 (+3.10).

Place	Player	Score	To par
1	(Spain) Sergio García	65-71=136	−6
2	(South Korea) K. J. Choi	69-69=138	−4
T3	(Spain) Miguel Ángel Jiménez	69-70=139	−3
T3	(Canada) Mike Weir	71-68=139	−3
T5	(United States) Jim Furyk	70-70=140	−2
T5	(United States) Boo Weekley	68-72=140	−2
T7	(Argentina) Ángel Cabrera	68-73=141	−1
T7	(Scotland) Alastair Forsyth	70-71=141	−1
T7	(South Africa) Retief Goosen	70-71=141	−1
T7	(United States) J. J. Henry	70-71=141	−1
T7	(Argentina) Andrés Romero	71-70=141	−1
T7	(England) Lee Westwood	71-70=141	−1

Amateurs: McIlroy (+2), Weaver (+6), Ramsay (+9), Coupland (+11), Waring (+12), Matthews (+16).

=== Third round ===
Saturday, 21 July 2007

Sergio García's 68 (−3) extended his lead to three strokes and was now at 204 (−9) after 54 holes. Paul McGinley rebounded with 68 (−3), three-under for the championship and tied for third place with six others. Tiger Woods shot a 69 (−2) which put him at −1 going into the weekend. At eight strokes behind the leader, his quest for a third straight Open Championship was improbable; he had never won a major when trailing after 54 holes.

The best round on Saturday was an amazing 64 (−7) by Steve Stricker, which was the lowest ever for an Open Championship round at Carnoustie. It also tied the course record (Alan Tait scored 64 during a pro-am in 1994, and Colin Montgomerie scored the same during the Scottish Open in 1995). Stricker birdied five of the first seven holes en route to a bogey-free round with seven birdies and climbed the leaderboard into solo second place, three strokes behind García. Chris DiMarco's 66 (−5) moved him into a tie for third at −3, six shots back. García had yet to win a major championship, and for the first time in his career, led a major after 54 holes. The only Spaniard to win the Open is hall of famer Seve Ballesteros, with three titles. The scoring average on Saturday was 71.61 (+0.61).

Place	Player	Score	To par
1	(Spain) Sergio García	65-71-68=204	−9
2	(United States) Steve Stricker	71-72-64=207	−6
T3	(England) Paul Broadhurst	71-71-68=210	−3
T3	(South Korea) K. J. Choi	69-69-72=210	−3
T3	(United States) Stewart Cink	69-73-68=210	−3
T3	(United States) Chris DiMarco	74-70-66=210	−3
T3	(South Africa) Ernie Els	72-70-68=210	−3
T3	(Republic of Ireland) Pádraig Harrington	69-73-68=210	−3
T3	(Republic of Ireland) Paul McGinley	67-75-68=210	−3
T10	(United States) Jim Furyk	70-70-71=211	−2
T10	(Spain) Miguel Ángel Jiménez	69-70-72=211	−2
T10	(Argentina) Andrés Romero	71-70-70=211	−2
T10	(Fiji) Vijay Singh	72-71-68=211	−2
T10	(Canada) Mike Weir	71-68-72=211	−2

=== Final round ===
Sunday, 22 July 2007

Another wild final round had numerous lead changes, and it came down to Sergio García, Andres Romero, and Pádraig Harrington in the final holes. García struggled at times during his only over-par round of the tournament, but was still at 8-under (+1 for the day) entering the last couple of holes. Meanwhile, Harrington had four birdies followed by an eagle at the 14th hole to move to 9-under for the championship, and stood on the 18th tee with a one-shot lead. Harrington went into the Barry Burn twice, but salvaged a double-bogey six to finish with a round of 67 (−4), 7-under for the tournament. García, who now had a one-shot lead on the par-4 72nd hole, found a greenside bunker with his approach shot. He left himself a ten footer (3 m) for par and the title, but the putt lipped out and he had to settle for a playoff, scoring a 73 (+2) for the round.

Romero shot par or better in every round, and had ten birdies Sunday. He was at 9-under after 70 holes with a two-stroke lead, but the Argentine was done in by a double bogey-bogey ending to finish a single stroke out of the playoff. The best round of the day was by Richard Green who shot a 64 (−7). The Australian equalled the course record during an Open set the previous day by American Steve Stricker, and set the target in the clubhouse on 279. He began the day at +2 and his round put him in a tie for fourth. Rory McIlroy shot +1 on the day, +5 for the tournament, to finish tied 42nd and win the silver medal for top amateur in his first Open. The scoring average on the day was 72.79 (+1.79).

Place	Player	Score	To par	Money (£)
T1	(Republic of Ireland) Pádraig Harrington	69-73-68-67=277	−7	Playoff
T1	(Spain) Sergio García	65-71-68-73=277	−7	Playoff
3	(Argentina) Andrés Romero	71-70-70-67=278	−6	290,000
T4	(South Africa) Ernie Els	72-70-68-69=279	−5	200,000
T4	(Australia) Richard Green	72-73-70-64=279	−5	200,000
T6	(United States) Stewart Cink	69-73-68-70=280	−4	145,500
T6	(United States) Hunter Mahan	73-73-69-65=280	−4	145,500
T8	(South Korea) K. J. Choi	69-69-72-71=281	−3	94,750
T8	(United States) Ben Curtis	72-74-70-65=281	−3	94,750
T8	(United States) Steve Stricker	71-72-64-74=281	−3	94,750
T8	(Canada) Mike Weir	71-68-72-70=281	−3	94,750

Top amateur: Rory McIlroy (+5)

- The first ten players, plus ties, are invited to the 2008 Open Championship

Full Leaderboard

==== Scorecard ====
Final round

Hole	1	2	3	4	5	6	7	8	9	10	11	12	13	14	15	16	17	18
Par	4	4	4	4	4	5	4	3	4	4	4	4	3	5	4	3	4	4
(Republic of Ireland) Harrington	−3	−3	−4	−4	−4	−5	−5	−5	−6	−6	−7	−7	−7	−9	−9	−9	−9	−7
(Spain) Garcia	−9	−9	−10	−10	−9	−9	−8	−7	−7	−7	−7	−7	−8	−9	−8	−8	−8	−7
(Argentina) Romero	−2	−2	−3	−4	−4	−5	−5	−6	−5	−6	−7	−5	−6	−7	−8	−9	−7	−6
(South Africa) Els	−3	−4	−5	−5	−5	−6	−6	−6	−6	−6	−6	−6	−5	−6	−5	−5	−5	−5
(Australia) Green	+2	+1	E	E	E	−1	−1	−1	−2	−2	−2	−2	−3	−5	−5	−5	−6	−5
(United States) Stricker	−6	−6	−6	−7	−6	−6	−6	−6	−5	−5	−5	−5	−5	−5	−5	−4	−3	−3

Cumulative tournament scores, relative to par

==== Playoff ====
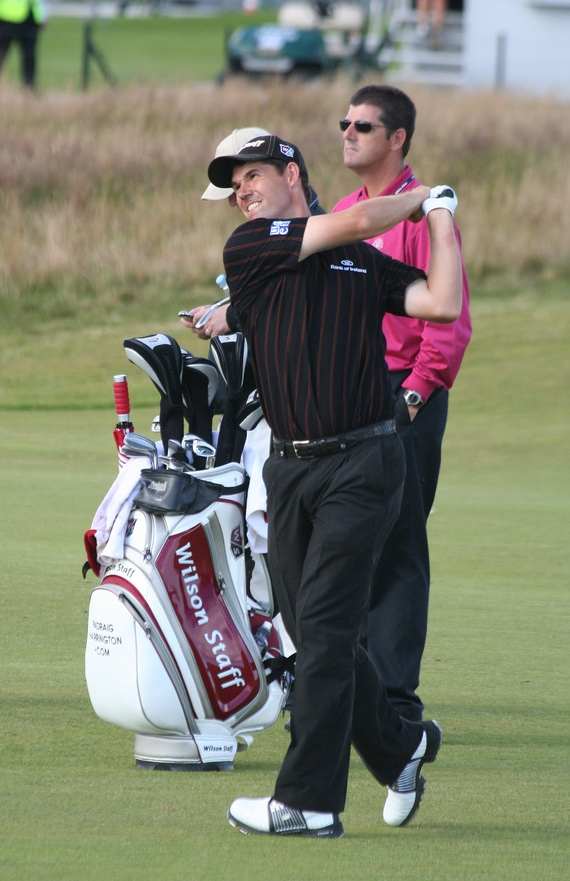
Pádraig Harrington at the 2007 Open Championship

Harrington became the first Irishman to win the Open Championship since Fred Daly at Royal Liverpool in 1947 and also the first Open Championship winner from the Republic of Ireland after defeating García in a playoff by one shot. The four-hole aggregate playoff included holes 1, 16, 17, and 18. Harrington birdied the par-4 first hole while García bogeyed, a two-stroke edge. Both players parred the next two holes (García hit the pin on the par-3 16th but his ball rolled a distance away), so Harrington still led by two strokes heading into the dangerous 18th. Harrington played the hole more cautiously this time, and reached the green in three shots. García gave himself a chance by reaching the green in two, but his birdie putt burned the left edge. Harrington made his short bogey putt to become the first European winner of a major since Paul Lawrie of Scotland triumphed in a three-way playoff at Carnoustie in 1999; the win moved Harrington's world ranking up to sixth.

Place	Player	Score	To par	Money (£)
1	(Republic of Ireland) Pádraig Harrington	3-3-4-5=15	E	750,000
2	(Spain) Sergio García	5-3-4-4=16	+1	450,000

===== Scorecard =====
Hole	1	16	17	18
Par	4	3	4	4
(Republic of Ireland) Harrington	−1	−1	−1	E
(Spain) Garcia	+1	+1	+1	+1

Cumulative playoff scores, relative to par
