= Carris Trophy =

Boys' golf tournament in England

Tournament information
- Location: England
- Established: 1935
- Course(s): Ormskirk Golf Club (2024)
- Organised by: England Golf
- Format: Stroke play
- Month played: July

Current champion
- (France) Callixte Alzas

The Carris Trophy is the English Boys Under 18 Open Amateur Stroke-Play Championship. It was founded in 1935.

== History ==
The event was founded as a boys' golf tournament in 1935 at the Moor Park Golf Club by Austin Carris. The competition was adopted in 1988 by the English Golf Union as the English Boys Under 18 Open Amateur Stroke-Play Championship. It is now played at various venues around England, but returns to Moor Park at four or five year intervals reflecting the inauguration of the trophy at this course.

== Format ==
The championship is open to golfers of all nationalities in possession of a playing handicap not exceeding 1.4 under the CONGU Unified Handicapping System or a comparable scheme operated by a recognised overseas Golf Union, Federation or Association. Players must be under 18 at the start of the year in which the championship is played. It consists of 72 holes of stroke play over four days, 18 holes being played each day. After 36 holes, the leading 60 competitors and all those tying for 60th place play a further 36 holes over the next two days.

== Winners ==
Year	Winner	Venue	Score
2025	Callixte Alzas	Luffenham Heath	271
2024	Daniel Hayes	Ormskirk	268
2023	Tyler Weaver	Moor Park	272
2022	Dylan Shaw-Radford	Silloth on Solway	273
2021	Harley Smith	Bristol & Clifton	272
2020	Henry Hayward	Broadstone	135
2019	Ben Schmidt	Moor Park	283*
2018	Barclay Brown	Fulford	280
2017	Andrea Romano	West Sussex	264*
2016	Angus Flanagan	Hunstanton	277*
2015	Bradley Moore	Little Aston	280
2014	Hayden McCullen	Moor Park	286*
2013	Ben Amor	West Lancs	286*
2012	Patrick Kelly	Royal Cinque Ports	281*
2011	Harry Casey	Broadstone	274
2010	Callum Shinkwin	Woodhall Spa	281
2009	Tom Lewis	Moor Park	282*
2008	Stiggy Hodgson	Wallasey	288*
2007	Matt Haines	Saunton	288
2006	Darren Wright	Sherwood Forest	276
2005	Tom Haylock	Moor Park	283
2004	Pablo Martín	Northumberland	276
2003	Daniel Denison & Grant Slater	Burnham & Berrow	286
2002	Carlos del Moral	Beau Desert	282
2001	Raphaël de Sousa	Moor Park	274
2000	Gary Lockerbie	Formby	279
1999	David Porter	High Post	275
1998	Scott Godfrey	Whittington Heath	286
1997	David Griffiths	Moor Park	283
1996	Graeme Storm	Seaton Carew	281
1995	Justin Rose	Burnham & Berrow	266
1994	Robert Duck	Northants County	280
1993	Jamie Harris	Moor Park	285
1992	Mark Foster	Hesketh	286
1991	Iain Pyman	Long Ashton	284
1990	Michael Welch	Luffenham Heath	276
1989	Ian Garbutt	Moor Park	285
1988	Paul Page	Brancepeth Castle	281
1987	David Bathgate	Moor Park	289
1986	Gary Evans	Moor Park	292
1985	Peter Baker	Moor Park	286
1984	John Coe	Moor Park	283
1983	Peter Baker	Moor Park	288
1982	Mark Jarvis	Moor Park	298
1981	David Gilford	Moor Park	290
1980	Mike McLean	Moor Park	290
1979	Peter Hammond	Moor Park	288
1978	Jonathan Plaxton	Moor Park	144
1977	Roy Mugglestone	Moor Park	293*
1976	Hogan Stott	Moor Park	285
1975	Sandy Lyle	Moor Park	270
1974	Ken Brown	Moor Park	304
1973	Steve Hadfield	Moor Park	148
1972	Lawrence Donovan	Moor Park	143
1971	Richard Evans	Moor Park	146*
1970	Martin Foster	Moor Park	146
1969	Ian Gradwell	Moor Park	150
1968	Peter Dawson	Moor Park	149
1967	Roger Brown	Moor Park	147
1966	Alistair Black	Moor Park	151
1965	George McKay	Moor Park	145
1964	Peter Townsend	Moor Park	148
1963	John Threlfall	Moor Park	147
1962	Finlay Morris	Moor Park	145
1961	Douglas Miller	Moor Park	143*
1960	Paul Baxter	Moor Park	150
1959	Bobby Walker	Moor Park	152
1958	John Hamilton	Moor Park	149
1957	George Maisey	Moor Park	145
1956	George Maisey	Moor Park	141
1955	Ian Wheater	Moor Park	151
1954	Keith Warren	Moor Park	149
1953	Norman Johnson	Moor Park	148
1952	Niels Thygesen	Moor Park	155*
1951	Ian Young	Moor Park	154
1950	John Glover	Moor Park	144
1949	Patrick Hine	Moor Park	148
1948	Ian Caldwell	Moor Park	152
1947	Ian Caldwell	Moor Park	159
1946	Arthur Perowne	Moor Park	158
1940–1945: No tournament due to World War II
1939	C W Warren	Moor Park	149
1938	Ian Garrow	Moor Park	149
1937	Ronnie White	Moor Park	147
1936	John Langley	Moor Park	152
1935	Ronald Upex	Moor Park	75

* – After a playoff

In 1935 the trophy was played over 18 holes. From 1936 to 1973 and in 1978 it was played over 36 holes. In 1965 it was reduced to 65 holes with only 29 holes being played on the first day after a delayed start because of snow and frost. In 1995 it was reduced to 66 holes by bad weather. In 2020 it was reduced to 36 holes by bad weather.
