= Adam Hunter (golfer) =

Scottish professional golfer

Personal information
- Full name: Adam James Hunter
- Nationality: Scotland
- Born: 26 September 1963 Glasgow, Scotland
- Died: 14 October 2011 (aged 48) Glasgow, Scotland
- Height: 5 ft 7 in (1.70 m)
- Weight: 154 lb (70 kg; 11.0 st)

Career
- Sport: Golf
- College: Virginia Tech
- Turned professional: 1984
- Former tour: European Tour
- Professional wins: 5

Number of wins by tour
- European Tour: 1
- Other: 4

Best results in major championships
- Masters Tournament: DNP
- PGA Championship: DNP
- U.S. Open: DNP
- The Open Championship: CUT: 1986, 1987, 1991

Adam James Hunter (26 September 1963 – 14 October 2011) was a Scottish professional golfer. His achievements included winning the 1995 Portuguese Open. He later became a renowned coach for such golfers as Paul Lawrie.

== Career ==
After completing two-and-a-half years of a golf scholarship at Virginia Tech in the United States, he turned professional in 1984. He joined the European Tour the following year after coming through final qualifying school. He failed to hold on to his tour card in his rookie season, but was back on tour after another successful visit to qualifying school.

Having lost his playing privileges again at the end of the 1986 season, when he made just one cut, Hunter did not return to the European Tour until 1990. He maintained consistent form though the 1990s earning sufficient money each season to retain his tour card until the end of 1998. His only win on the tour came at the 1995 Portuguese Open, and that season he finished a career high 63rd on the European Tour Order of Merit. He also won the 1987 Northern Open, a non-tour event.

Hunter became a successful golf coach. He worked with many top professionals, including 1999 Open Champion Paul Lawrie from 1998 to 2004, and LPGA Tour player Catriona Matthew. He also provided coaching to Scottish golfers Stephen Gallacher, Alastair Forsyth and Gary Orr.

== Death ==
Hunter died at the Beatson Oncology Centre on 14 October 2011 from leukaemia, two years after his diagnosis with the disease. He was 48.

== Professional wins (5) ==
=== European Tour wins (1) ===
No.	Date	Tournament	Winning score	Margin of victory	Runner-up
1	19 Mar 1995	Portuguese Open	−11 (73-65-71-68=277)	Playoff	(Northern Ireland) Darren Clarke

European Tour playoff record (1–0)

No.	Year	Tournament	Opponent	Result
1	1995	Portuguese Open	(Northern Ireland) Darren Clarke	Won with birdie on first extra hole

=== Other wins (4) ===
- 1985 Granite City Classic
- 1986 Carnoustie Challenge
- 1987 Northern Open, Scottish Under-25 Championship

== Results in major championships ==
Tournament	1986	1987	1988	1989	1990	1991
The Open Championship	CUT	CUT				CUT

Note: Hunter only played in The Open Championship.

Did not play

CUT = missed the half-way cut

== Team appearances ==
Amateur

- Jacques Léglise Trophy (representing Great Britain & Ireland): 1981 (winners)
