= McGregor Trophy =

Boys' golf tournament

Tournament information
- Location: England
- Established: 1982
- Course(s): Radcliffe on Trent GC (2025)
- Par: 70
- Length: 6495
- Organised by: England Golf
- Format: Stroke play
- Month played: July

Current champion
- (Netherlands) Pieter Milan Werner

The McGregor Trophy is the English Boys Under 16 Open Amateur Stroke-Play Championship. It was founded in 1982.

== History ==
The event was founded as a boys' golf tournament in 1982 at the Radcliffe-on-Trent Golf Club by Roy Case, later to become president of the English Golf Union. The trophy was donated by Matt and Kathy McGregor, former captains of the club. The competition was adopted in 1993 by the English Golf Union as the English Boys Under 16 Open Amateur Stroke-Play Championship. It is now played at various venues around England, but returns to Radcliffe-on-Trent Golf Club at five year intervals reflecting the inauguration of the trophy at this course.

== Format ==
The championship is open to golfers of all nationalities in possession of a playing handicap not exceeding 4.4. Players must be under 16 years of age on 1 January of the year in which the event takes place. It consists of 72 holes of stroke play over three days, 18 holes being played on each of the first two days. After 36 holes, the leading 40 competitors and all those tying for 40th place play a further 36 holes on the third day.

== Winners ==
Year	Winner	Course	Score
2025	Pieter Milan Werner	Radcliffe on Trent GC	274
2024	Yago Horno	West Essex GC	271
2023	Kris Kim	Hunstanton GC	276
2022	Mark Gazi	Sherwood Forest GC	280
2021	Harley Smith	Camberley Heath GC	271
2020	Cancelled		
2019	Joshua Hill	Radcliffe on Trent GC	276
2018	Conor Gough	Kedleston Park GC	281
2017	Joonas Turba	Burnham & Berrow GC	286
2016	Rasmus Højgaard	Royal Ashdown Forest	281
2015	Ignacio Puente	Wallasey GC	287
2014	John Axelsen	Radcliffe on Trent GC	274
2013	Marco Penge	Seacroft GC	283
2012	Jake Storey	Trevose GC	285
2011	Jack Hermeston	South Moor GC	281
2010	Toby Tree	Princes GC	290
2009	Sebastian Crookall-Nixon	Radcliffe on Trent GC	279
2008	Sebastian Crookall-Nixon	Highpost GC	278
2007	Adam Carson	Southport & Ainsdale GC	218
2006	Oscar Sharpe	Worthing (Lower) GC	287
2005	Adam Myers	Radcliffe on Trent GC	286
2004	Oliver Fisher	Dudsbury GC	290
2003	Wouter de Vries	Rotherham GC	281
2002	Matthew Baldwin	Sherringham GC	289
2001	Paul Waring	Radcliffe on Trent GC	212
2000	Michael Skelton	Woodbury Park GC	289
1999	James Heath	Fairhaven GC	280
1998	Yasin Ali	Radcliffe on Trent GC	280
1997	Roberto Paolillo	Radcliffe on Trent GC	285
1996	Edoardo Molinari	Radcliffe on Trent GC	291
1995	Justin Rose	Radcliffe on Trent GC	287
1994	Graeme Storm	Radcliffe on Trent GC	291
1993	Kurt Bridgen	Radcliffe on Trent GC	290
1992	Steve Webster	Radcliffe on Trent GC	290
1991	Jonathon Bromley	Radcliffe on Trent GC	286
1990	David Turnbill	Radcliffe on Trent GC	283
1989	Steven Weir	Radcliffe on Trent GC	292
1988	Phil Edwards	Radcliffe on Trent GC	306
1987	Jim Payne	Radcliffe on Trent GC	221
1986	Jim Payne	Radcliffe on Trent GC	294
1985	Heath Linacre	Radcliffe on Trent GC	304
1984	Mark Nunn	Radcliffe on Trent GC	286
1983	Shaun Smith	Radcliffe on Trent GC	295
1982	Martin Long	Radcliffe on Trent GC	151

In 1982 the trophy was played over 36 holes. In 1987, 2001 and 2007 the event was reduced to 54 holes by bad weather.

== Notable winners ==
A number of golfers who have won the McGregor Trophy have progressed to successful professional careers, including the 2013 U.S. Open champion Justin Rose, Edoardo Molinari, who played in the 2010 Ryder Cup, and European Tour winners Jim Payne, Steve Webster, Graeme Storm, and Oliver Fisher.
