= Radcliffe-on-Trent Golf Club =

Golf course in Nottinghamshire, England

Coordinates: 52.943°N 1.022°W

Radcliffe-on-Trent Golf Club is a golf course in Radcliffe-on-Trent, Nottinghamshire, England, notable as the course where the McGregor Trophy (English U16 boys championship) was inaugurated by Roy Case in 1982.

== History ==
The club was founded as a nine-hole parkland golf course in 1909. It was extended to an 18-hole course in 1925 after the club bought land from the Manvers Estate, and further remodelled on additional land in 1972 by the golf course architect Frank Pennick The course is located approximately 5 miles to the east of Nottingham in Radcliffe-on-Trent on Cropwell Road, just south of the A52. Its foundation was marked with a golf match on 9 October 1909 between two notable professional golfers of the time, Tom Williamson and Harry Vardon, this was watched by over 200 spectators. The trophy, won by Vardon, was reacquired by the Club for its centenary in 2009, which was also marked with matches against Rushcliffe Golf Club which also celebrated its Centenary, and by hosting the McGregor Trophy which is the national under 16 boys stroke play tournament organised by the English Golf Union.

=== William McGowan ===
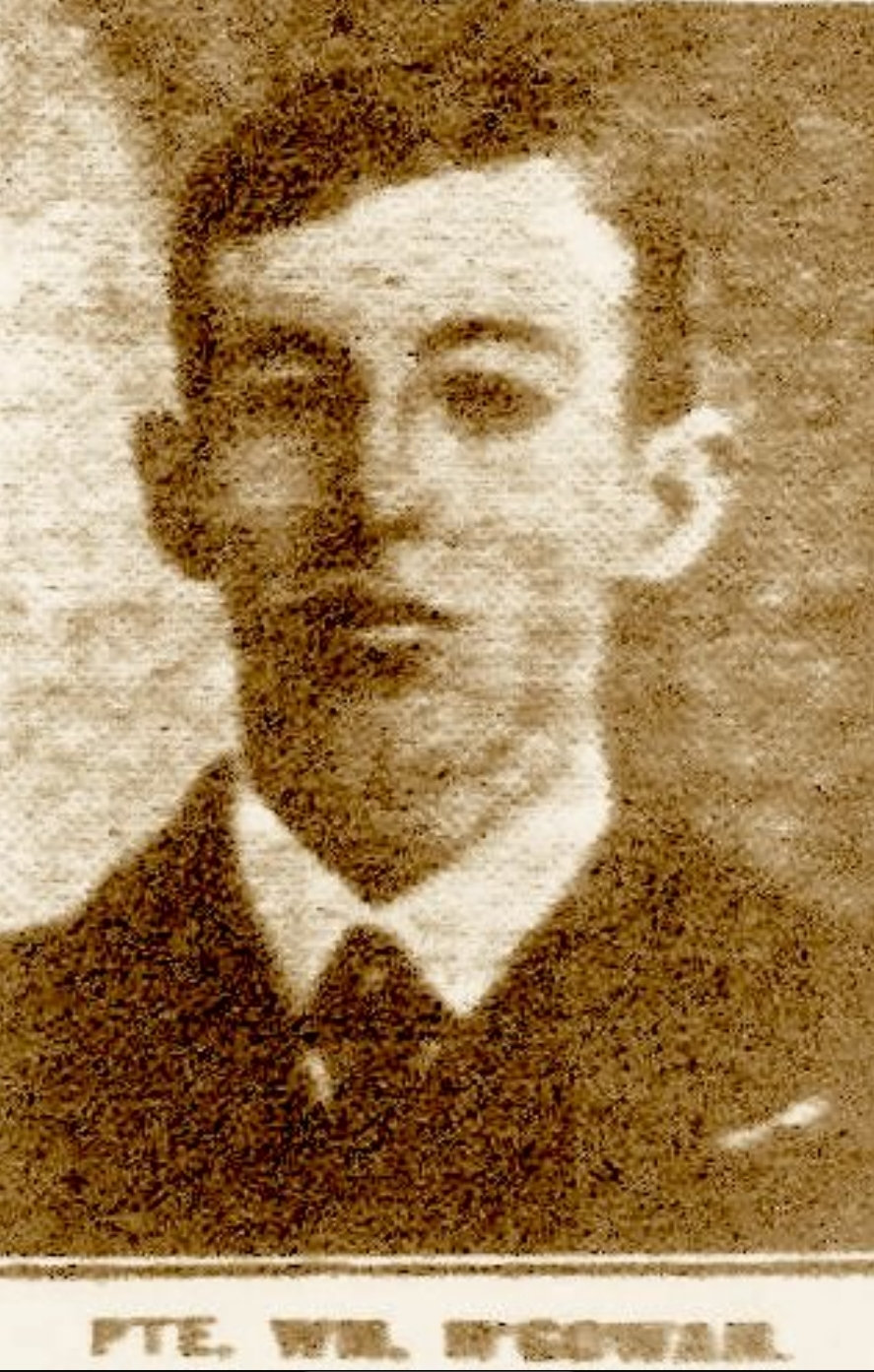
William

William McGowan (1886–1918) was a Scottish golfer and early professional at the club. McGowan was born in 1886 in Prestwick, Ayrshire, Scotland. He eventually became the professional at the club, where he was an apprentice to Tom Williamson and David Kinell, who both came in the top 10 in The Open Championship at least once. There is no record of significant tournament victories, but he participated in the Open qualifying in Prestwick in 1908, the Midland Professional Championship and the £350 Foursome.

When World War I broke out, William enlisted in the Sherwood Foresters and later The Queen's (Royal West Surrey Regiment) 7th Battalion, regiment of the British Army. He served as a private on the Western Front. On 24 October 1918, He was killed in action during the final stages of the war as Allied forces advanced through northern France. His death occurred just weeks before the armistice on 11 November 1918. McGowan was buried at the Verchain British Cemetery in Fontaine-au-Bois, Nord, France. The cemetery contains the graves of soldiers who fell during the final months of the war.

== Course ==
The course measures 6495 yards off the black tees and is a par 70 with a course rating of 71.2 and a slope rating of 125 for men. Off the red tees the course measures 5522 yards and is a par 72 with a course rating of 71.9 and a slope rating of 125 for women. The course is characterised by tight fairways lined with mature trees, and by relatively long par 3 holes. As a private club it has a maximum of 695 male and female members.
