= 2023 European Senior Tour =

Golf tour season

2023 European Senior Tour season
- Duration: 19 May 2023 – 10 December 2023
- Number of official events: 16
- Most wins: (England) Peter Baker (4) (Brazil) Adilson da Silva (4)
- Order of Merit: (England) Peter Baker
- Rookie of the Year: (Sweden) Patrik Sjöland

The 2023 European Senior Tour, titled as the 2023 Legends Tour, was the 31st season of the European Senior Tour, the main professional golf tour in Europe for men aged 50 and over.

== Schedule ==
The following table lists official events during the 2023 season.

| Date | Tournament | Host country | Purse (€) | Winner (Note: The number in brackets after each winner's name is the number of European Senior Tour events they had won up to and including that tournament. This information is only shown for European Senior Tour members.) | Notes |
|---|---|---|---|---|---|
| 20 May | Riegler & Partner Legends | Austria | 250,000 | (Brazil) Adilson da Silva (2) | |
| 28 May | KitchenAid Senior PGA Championship | United States | US$3,500,000 | (United States) Steve Stricker (n/a) | Senior major championship |
| 11 Jun | Jersey Legends | Jersey | 300,000 | (Australia) Richard Green (3) | |
| 25 Jun | Irish Legends | Ireland | 300,000 | (England) Peter Baker (2) | |
| 2 Jul | U.S. Senior Open | United States | US$4,000,000 | (Germany) Bernhard Langer (8) | Senior major championship (Note: Official win; unofficial money.) |
| 9 Jul | Swiss Seniors Open | Switzerland | 250,000 | (Brazil) Adilson da Silva (3) | |
| 30 Jul | The Senior Open Championship | Wales | US$2,750,000 | (Germany) Alex Čejka (3) | Senior major championship |
| 5 Aug | JCB Championship | England | 1,000,000 | (England) Peter Baker (3) | |
| 14 Aug | Legends Tour Trophy | England | 500,000 | (Wales) Bradley Dredge (1) | New tournament |
| 27 Aug | Staysure PGA Seniors Championship | Scotland | 500,000 | (England) Peter Baker (4) | |
| 9 Sep | WCM Legends Open de France | France | 350,000 | (Brazil) Adilson da Silva (4) | |
| 17 Sep | WINSTONgolf Senior Open | Germany | 450,000 | (Australia) Scott Hend (1) | |
| 29 Oct | Sergio Melpignano Senior Italian Open | Italy | 300,000 | (South Africa) James Kingston (3) | |
| 5 Nov | Farmfoods European Senior Masters | Spain | 275,000 | (Sweden) Patrik Sjöland (1) | |
| 2 Dec | Vinpearl DIC Legends Championship | Vietnam | US$730,000 | (Brazil) Adilson da Silva (5) | New limited-field event |
| 10 Dec | MCB Tour Championship | Mauritius | US$1,000,000 | (England) Peter Baker (5) | Tour Championship |

== Order of Merit ==
The Order of Merit was titled as the MCB Road to Mauritius and was based on tournament results during the season, calculated using a points-based system.

| Position | Player | Points |
|---|---|---|
| 1 | (England) Peter Baker | 4,161 |
| 2 | (Brazil) Adilson da Silva | 3,443 |
| 3 | (South Africa) James Kingston | 1,634 |
| 4 | (Argentina) Ricardo González | 1,618 |
| 5 | (Sweden) Patrik Sjöland | 1,593 |

== Awards ==
| Award | Winner | Ref. |
|---|---|---|
| Rookie of the Year (Barry Lane Award) | (Sweden) Patrik Sjöland | |
