= English Women's Golf Association =

English Governing body responsible for aspects of women's and girl's amateur golf

- Sport: Amateur Golf
- Abbreviation: EWGA
- Founded: 1952
- Affiliation: Ladies Golf Union
- Location: 11 Highfield Road
- Closure date: 2011
- (England)

The English Women's Golf Association (EWGA) was the governing body responsible for many aspects of women's and girls' amateur golf in England. It ran from 1952 to 2011, until it merged with the men's English Golf Union to form England Golf.

It was based on Highfield Road in Birmingham.

== History ==
The EWGA (formerly ELGA) was founded in 1952 as an offshoot of the Ladies' Golf Union (LGU), the organisation which governs the female amateur game across the whole of Great Britain and Ireland.

== Responsibilities ==
The LGU was concerned with essential policy matters and the organisation of all Britain and Ireland Championships and international events. The EWGA and its counterparts in Ireland, Scotland and Wales handled local events in their own countries, the handicapping system through their membership of the Council of National Golf Unions (CONGU) and liaison with clubs. The EWGA was also responsible for promoting golf to girls and women in England.
