= Roma Masters =

Defunct golf tournament in Rome, Italy

Tournament information
- Location: Rome, Italy
- Established: 1992
- Course: Castelgandolfo Country Club
- Par: 72
- Tour: European Tour
- Format: Stroke play
- Prize fund: £300,000
- Month played: April
- Final year: 1993

Tournament record score
- Aggregate: 281 Jean van de Velde (1993)
- To par: −7 as above

Final champion
- (France) Jean van de Velde
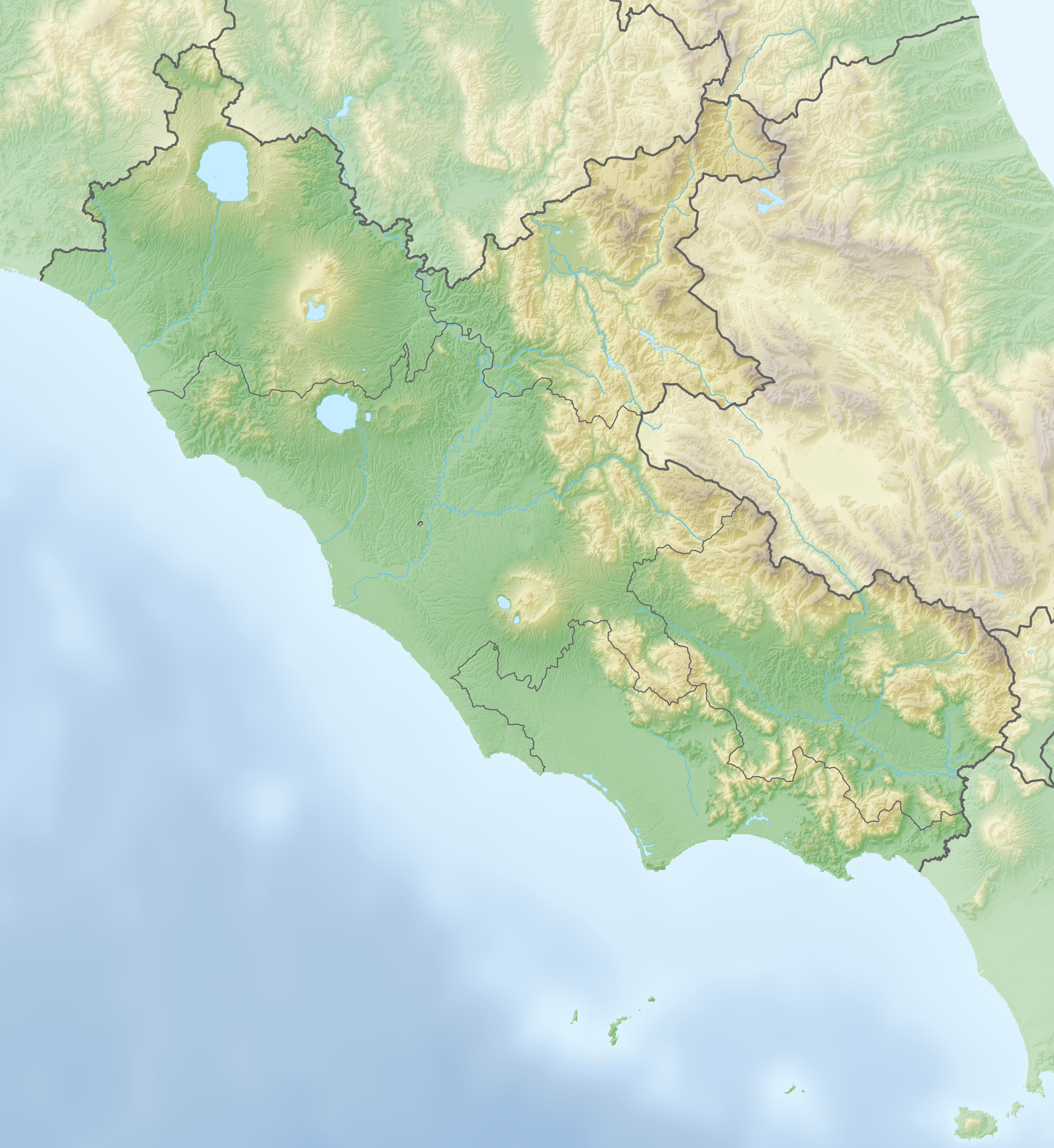
- Location in Italy Location in Lazio

The Roma Masters was a European Tour golf tournament which was played at Castelgandolfo, Rome, Italy in 1992 and 1993.

== History ==
In 1992, the tournament took place in Castelgandolfo CC, Rome, Italy, from April 2–5. The prize fund was £225,000.

In 1993, the tournament took place in Castelgandolfo CC, Rome, Italy, from April 15–18. The prize fund was £300,000, which was below average for a European Tour event at that time.

== Winners ==
Year	Winner	Score	To par	Margin of victory	Runner-up
1994	Cancelled				
1993	(France) Jean van de Velde	281	−7	Playoff	(New Zealand) Greg Turner
1992	(Spain) José María Cañizares	286	−2	Playoff	(England) Barry Lane
