= Mauritius Open =

The Mauritius Open was an annual golf tournament played on the island of Mauritius from 1994 through 2008. In 2009 the tournament was superseded by a new European Seniors Tour event, named the Mauritius Commercial Bank Open.

== Winners ==
Year	Winner	Country	Score
2008	Jamie Donaldson	Wales	203
2007	Peter Baker	England	206
2006	Van Phillips	England	207
2005	Miles Tunnicliff (2)	England	207
2004	Miles Tunnicliff	England	205
2003	Mark Mouland (2)	Wales	206
2002	Mark Mouland	Wales	203
2001	Sébastien Delagrange	France	205
2000	Michael McLean (2)	England	207
1999	Jonathan Lomas	England	210
1998	Rodger Davis	Australia	199
1997	Gordon Sherry	Scotland	211
1996	Philip Golding	England	209
1995	Marcello Santi	Italy	205
1994	Michael McLean	England	211
