= Richard Green (golfer) =

Australian professional golfer (born 1971)

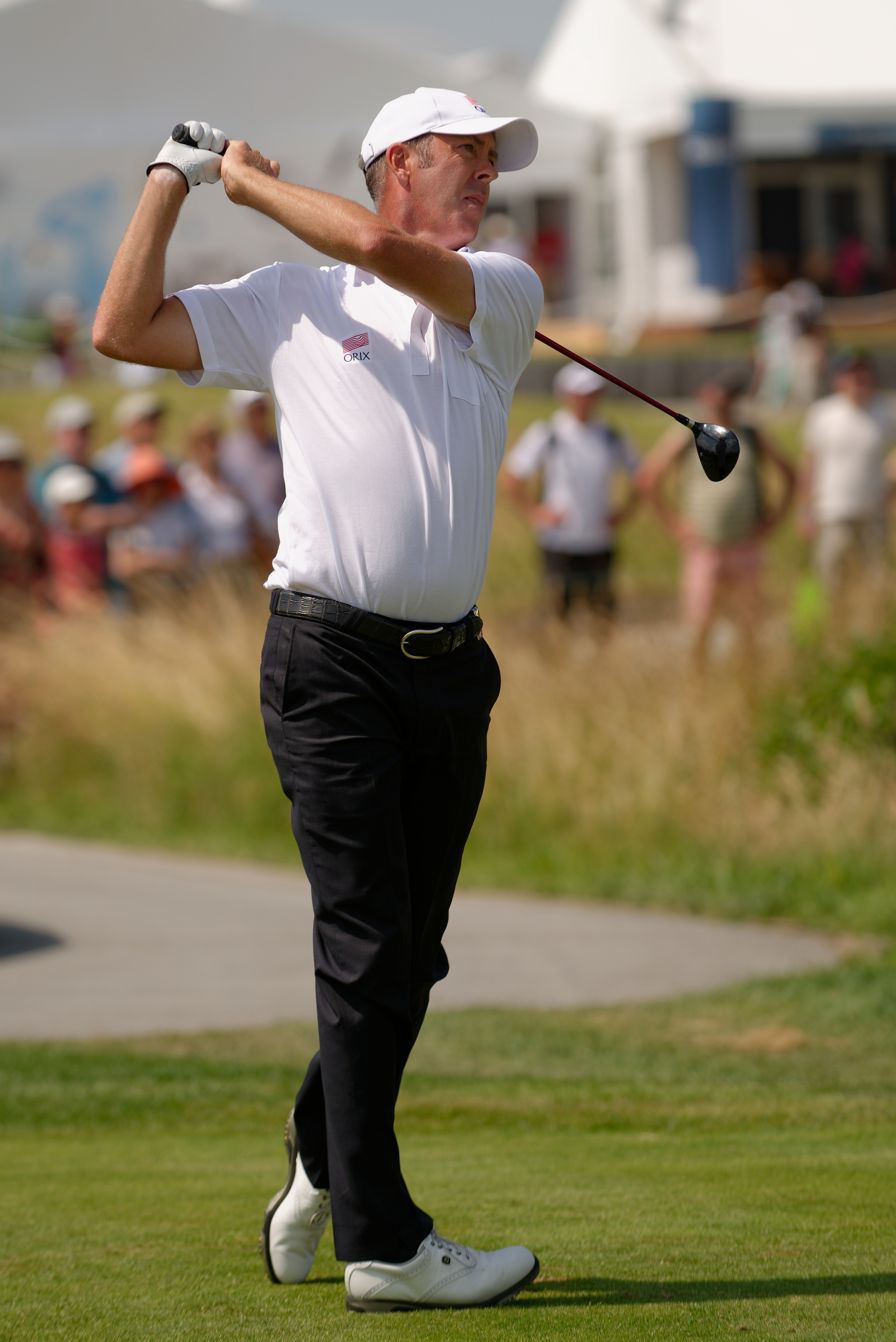
- Green at the 2013 Alstom Open de France

Personal information
- Full name: Richard George Green
- Nationality: Australia
- Born: 19 February 1971 (age 55) Williamstown, Melbourne, Victoria, Australia
- Height: 1.90 m (6 ft 3 in)

Career
- Sport: Golf
- Partner: Tammy Green
- Turned professional: 1992
- Current tours: PGA Tour Champions; European Senior Tour
- Former tours: European Tour; Asian Tour; PGA Tour of Australasia
- Professional wins: 13
- Highest ranking: 29 (22 July 2007)

Number of wins by tour
- European Tour: 3
- PGA Tour of Australasia: 2
- PGA Tour Champions: 1
- European Senior Tour: 3
- Other: 2

Best results in major championships
- Masters Tournament: CUT: 2008
- PGA Championship: T37: 2006
- U.S. Open: T52: 2005
- The Open Championship: T4: 2007

Achievements and awards
- PGA Tour of Australasia Order of Merit winner: 2004

Richard George Green (born 19 February 1971) is an Australian professional golfer.

== Early life ==
In 1971, Green was born in Williamstown, Victoria, a suburb of Melbourne, Australia.

== Professional career ==
In 1992, in the age of 21, Green turned professional. He joined the PGA Tour of Australasia the same year. He has been a member of the European Tour since 1996, with his first win coming at the 1997 Dubai Desert Classic. His consistent performances in 2004 took him to a career best European Tour Order of Merit finish of 17th. That same year he won the MasterCard Masters and also topped the PGA Tour of Australasia's Order of Merit. In 2007 he won his second European Tour event at the BA-CA Golf Open in Austria.

Green previously held a share of the course record at Carnoustie with a 64, achieved in the final round of the 2007 Open Championship. The round saw him jump 27 places on the last day of the tournament to finish in a tie for 4th with Ernie Els. The course record was later beaten by Tommy Fleetwood who shot a 63 at the Alfred Dunhill Links Championship in 2017.

== Personal life ==
Green is also a keen motor racing fan. He owns a Porsche 911 racing car in which he has competed in the Australian GT Championship. He has also raced on the support card of the 2009 Australian Grand Prix.

Among the cars he has owned in the past (and since sold) include the Bathurst 1000 winning Perkins Engineering Holden Commodore, Perkins Engineering Chassis 027.

== Awards and honors ==
In 2004, Green earned Order of Merit honors on the PGA Tour of Australasia.

== Professional wins (13) ==
=== European Tour wins (3) ===
No.	Date	Tournament	Winning score	Margin of victory	Runner(s)-up
1	2 Mar 1997	Dubai Desert Classic	−16 (70-68-66-68=272)	Playoff	(Australia) Greg Norman, (Wales) Ian Woosnam
2	10 Jun 2007	BA-CA Golf Open	−16 (66-65-67-70=268)	Playoff	(France) Jean-François Remésy
3	17 Oct 2010	Portugal Masters	−18 (70-66-69-65=270)	2 strokes	(Spain) Gonzalo Fernández-Castaño, (Sweden) Robert Karlsson, (Netherlands) Joost Luiten, (Italy) Francesco Molinari

European Tour playoff record (2–2)

No.	Year	Tournament	Opponent(s)	Result
1	1997	Dubai Desert Classic	(Australia) Greg Norman, (Wales) Ian Woosnam	Won with birdie on first extra hole
2	2006	KLM Open	(England) Simon Dyson	Lost to birdie on first extra hole
3	2007	BA-CA Golf Open	(France) Jean-François Remésy	Won with par on first extra hole
4	2014	Open de España	(Spain) Miguel Ángel Jiménez, (Belgium) Thomas Pieters	Jiménez won with par on first extra hole

=== PGA Tour of Australasia wins (2) ===
No.	Date	Tournament	Winning score	Margin of victory	Runner(s)-up
1	12 Dec 2004	MasterCard Masters	−17 (69-67-68-67=271)	Playoff	(Australia) Greg Chalmers, (Australia) David McKenzie
2	8 Feb 2015	Oates Vic Open	−16 (66-72-67-67=272)	Playoff	(Australia) Nick Cullen

PGA Tour of Australasia playoff record (2–0)

No.	Year	Tournament	Opponent(s)	Result
1	2004	MasterCard Masters	(Australia) Greg Chalmers, (Australia) David McKenzie	Won with birdie on first extra hole
2	2015	Oates Vic Open	(Australia) Nick Cullen	Won with birdie on second extra hole

=== Other wins (2) ===
- 1994 New Caledonian Open
- 1996 New Caledonian Open

=== PGA Tour Champions wins (1) ===
No.	Date	Tournament	Winning score	Margin of victory	Runner-up
1	17 Aug 2025	Rogers Charity Classic	−18 (65-62-65=192)	1 stroke	(Argentina) Ricardo González

PGA Tour Champions playoff record (0–2)

No.	Year	Tournament	Opponent	Result
1	2023	Dominion Energy Charity Classic	(United States) Harrison Frazar	Lost to birdie on first extra hole
2	2024	Sanford International	(United States) Steve Stricker	Lost to birdie on fourth extra hole

=== European Senior Tour wins (3) ===
No.	Date	Tournament	Winning score	Margin of victory	Runner-up
1	12 Jun 2022	Jersey Legends	−10 (67-68-71=206)	Playoff	(Scotland) Paul Lawrie
2	17 Jul 2022	WINSTONgolf Senior Open	−8 (68-72-68=208)	Playoff	(England) Phillip Archer
3	11 Jun 2023	Jersey Legends (2)	−9 (70-66-71=207)	1 stroke	(Scotland) Greig Hutcheon

European Senior Tour playoff record (2–0)

No.	Year	Tournament	Opponent	Result
1	2022	Jersey Legends	(Scotland) Paul Lawrie	Won with par on third extra hole
2	2022	WINSTONgolf Senior Open	(England) Phillip Archer	Won with birdie on fifth extra hole

=== PGA of Australia Legends Tour wins (2) ===
- 2022 NSW Senior Open, Nova Employment Australian PGA Seniors Championship

== Results in major championships ==
Tournament	1997	1998	1999	2000	2001	2002	2003	2004	2005	2006	2007	2008	2009	2010	2011
Masters Tournament												CUT			
U.S. Open									T52	CUT					
The Open Championship	CUT		CUT		T42	T59		CUT	T32	CUT	T4	T32	CUT		T16
PGA Championship									CUT	T37	T40	71	T60		CUT

Top 10
Did not play

CUT = missed the half-way cut
"T" = tied

=== Summary ===
Tournament	Wins	2nd	3rd	Top-5	Top-10	Top-25	Events	Cuts made
Masters Tournament	0	0	0	0	0	0	1	0
U.S. Open	0	0	0	0	0	0	2	1
The Open Championship	0	0	0	1	1	2	11	6
PGA Championship	0	0	0	0	0	0	6	4
Totals	0	0	0	1	1	2	20	11

- Most consecutive cuts made – 3 (2006 PGA – 2007 PGA)
- Longest streak of top-10s – 1

== Results in The Players Championship ==
Tournament	2005
The Players Championship	T46

"T" indicates a tie for a place

== Results in World Golf Championships ==
Tournament	2004	2005	2006	2007	2008	2009	2010	2011
Match Play		R64	R64	R64	R64			R64
Championship	T28	T51			T51			
Invitational		67		T30	T43			T37
Champions								

Did not play

QF, R16, R32, R64 = Round in which player lost in match play
"T" = Tied
Note that the HSBC Champions did not become a WGC event until 2009.

== Team appearances ==
Amateur

- Australian Men's Interstate Teams Matches (representing Victoria): 1990, 1991, 1992

Professional

- World Cup (representing Australia): 1998, 2008, 2011
