= Trevose Golf & Country Club =

Golf club in Cornwall, England

- Location in Cornwall Location in England
- 50°31′53.69″N 5°0′36.94″W

Club information
- Location: Constantine Bay, Cornwall, England
- Established: 1925
- Type: Private
- Tota holes: 27 plus 9 hole par 3 course
- Tournaments: Brabazon Trophy, Farmfoods European Legends Links Championship, Brabazon Trophy; McGregor Trophy
- Website: https://trevose-gc.co.uk/

Championship
- Designed by: Harry Colt
- Par: 72
- Length: 7,147 yards (6,535 m)
- Course rating: 74.3
- Slope rating: 128

Headland
- Par: 35
- Length: 3,031 yards (2,772 m)
- Course rating: 34.6
- Slope rating: 114

Short
- Par: 29
- Length: 1,360 yards (1,240 m)

Trevose Golf & Country Club is a 27-hole golf club in Cornwall, England which has hosted many of the leading amateur golf tournaments in Britain, including the Brabazon Trophy and professional events on the European Senior Tour.

== History ==
The land on which the course was built was acquired by Dr. Pension Williams in the early 1920s and early excavations of the site identified a holy well which allegedly dates from the third century which is located adjacent to the remains of St Constantine's Chapel.

The championship course was designed by Harry Colt and opened for play in 1925. The club was subsequently acquired by John C. Gammon together with another member in 1941 and subsequently acquired the whole of the club in 1955. The Gammon family have continued to oversee the management of the club since this date.

In 2012 the club published a book detailing the history of the club titled 'Trevose Golf & Country Club – A Golfing Gem on the North Cornwall Coast' which included a foreword by Peter Alliss.

The championship course as regularly been ranked as one of the top links courses in England.

== Tournaments hosted ==
The championship course has hosted a number of professional and amateur golf tournaments:

=== Amateur tournaments ===
The championship course hosted the Brabazon Trophy in 2008 which was won by Steven Uzzell of England with a 19 under par score of 197 in a tournament that was shortened to 54 holes as a result of adverse weather conditions. The championship course also hosted the McGregor Trophy for the English Boys Under 16 Open Amateur Stroke-Play Championship in 2012.

=== Professional tournaments ===
In 2019 Ian Woosnam announced that Trevose would be the host course for the Farmfoods European Legends Links Championship

== Course scorecards ==
Championship Course
Tee	Rating/Slope	1	2	3	4	5	6	7	8	9	Out	10	11	12	13	14	15	16	17	18	In	Total
Par	Men's	4	4	3	5	4	4	4	3	5	36	5	3	4	5	4	4	4	3	4	36	72
SI	Men's	4	12	16	18	2	10	6	14	8		13	7	1	3	15	17	11	5	9
Blue	74.3	449	425	173	504	471	389	427	160	515	3513	558	225	464	579	320	338	240	432	478	3634	7147
White	71.8	440	359	156	465	445	319	367	149	454	3154	472	197	440	574	307	330	206	375	430	3331	6485
Yellow	71.8	440	352	148	465	423	313	351	144	443	3079	460	179	427	524	296	325	183	353	414	3161	6240
Par	Women's	4	4	3	5	4	4	4	3	5	36	5	3	4	5	4	4	3	4	5	37	73
SI	Women's	5	11	15	7	1	13	3	17	9		6	12	2	8	14	18	16	4	10
Red	74.1	430	320	142	441	400	282	340	136	440	2931	440	163	392	490	292	266	157	319	407	2926	5857

== See also ==
List of golf courses in the United Kingdom
