= Cacharel World Under-25 Championship =

Professional golf tournament in France

Tournament information
- Location: Nîmes, France
- Established: 1976
- Course(s): Nîmes Campagne Golf Club
- Tour(s): European Tour (approved special event)
- Format: Stroke play
- Final year: 1983

Final champion
- Michael McLean

The Cacharel World Under-25 Championship was a professional golf tournament for under-25 golfers which was played annually in France from 1976 to 1983, except in 1977. In 1976 it was played in Évian-les-Bains but from 1978 to 1983 it was played in Nîmes.

It was an event on European Tour but prize money did not count towards the Order of Merit/Official Money List and a victory did not count as an official tour win; later such tournaments were designated as "approved special events". A similar event, the UAP European Under-25 Championship, was played in France from 1988.

The 1979 tournament was won by Bernhard Langer who triumphed by 17 strokes.

== Winners ==
Year	Winner	Score	Margin of victory	Runner(s)-up	Ref
1976	(Republic of Ireland) Eamonn Darcy	274	2 strokes	(England) Howard Clark	
1977	No tournament				
1978	(Canada) Jim Nelford	280	3 strokes	(United States) Pat McGowan	
1979	(West Germany) Bernhard Langer	274	17 strokes	(Canada) Jim Nelford (Zimbabwe Rhodesia) Denis Watson	
1980	(United States) Jack Renner	292	2 strokes	(Scotland) Ken Brown	
1981	(United States) Tim Simpson	287	10 strokes	(Mexico) Rafael Alarcón	
1982	(Wales) Ian Woosnam	290	5 strokes	(England) Keith Waters	
1983	(England) Michael McLean	285	4 strokes	(Wales) Mark Mouland	
