= Scottish Under-25 Championship =

Golf tournament

Tournament information
- Location: Scotland
- Established: 1980
- Format: stroke play
- Final year: 1998

The Scottish Under-25 Championship was a golf tournament for golfers under the age of 25, that was played from 1980 to 1998. In 1980 it was played over 36 holes but later it was a 72-hole stroke-play event on the "Tartan Tour", the PGA in Scotland's schedule.

== Winners ==
| Year | Winner | Score | Margin of victory | Runner(s)-up | Venue | Winner's share (£) | Ref |
Douglas Gillespie Plant Scottish Under-25 Professional Championship
| 1980 | (Scotland) Brian Marchbank | 138 | 3 strokes | (Scotland) Ross Drummond | West Kilbride | 500 | |
| 1981 | (Scotland) David Matthew | | | | Drumpellier | 500 | |
| 1982 | (Scotland) David Matthew | 286 | 5 strokes | (Scotland) Fraser Mann | Strathaven | | |
| 1983 | (Scotland) Fraser Mann | 271 | 9 strokes | (Scotland) Kevin Stables | Cathcart Castle | 500 | |
Scottish Under-25 Professional Championship
| 1984 | (Scotland) Kevin Stables | 287 | 1 stroke | (Scotland) Frank Coutts | Livingston | 500 | |
Livingston Scottish Under-25 Championship
| 1985 | (Scotland) Jim White | 288 | Playoff | (Scotland) Glenn Taylor | Livingston | 750 | |
| 1986 | (Scotland) Gordon Law | 286 | 5 strokes | (Scotland) Jim White (Scotland) Robert Craig | Livingston | 800 | |
| 1987 | (Scotland) Adam Hunter | 289 | 3 strokes | (Scotland) Colin Brooks (Scotland) Colin Gillies | Deer Park | 800 | |
| 1988 | (Scotland) Gordon Law | 286 | 2 strokes | (Scotland) Colin Brooks (Scotland) Lee Vannet | Deer Park | 800 | |
| 1989 | (Scotland) Colin Brooks | 275 | 1 stroke | (Scotland) Gary Collinson | Deer Park | 1,000 | |
| 1990 | (Scotland) Paul Lawrie | 281 | 7 strokes | (Scotland) Colin Gillies | Deer Park | 2,000 | |
Gore-Tex Scottish Under-25s Open Championship
| 1991 | (Scotland) Craig Cassells | 277 | 5 strokes | (England) Craig Corrigan (Scotland) William Guy | Deer Park | 3,300 | |
1992 and 1993: Not held
Scottish Under-25s Open Championship
| 1994 | (Scotland) Alan Tait | 274 | 2 strokes | (Scotland) Dean Robertson | Murrayshall | 1,250 | |
| 1995 | (Scotland) Nigel Scott-Smith | 286 | 6 strokes | (Scotland) Stewart Russell | Westerwood | | |
| 1996 | (Scotland) Alan Reid | 280 | 1 stroke | (Scotland) Alastair Forsyth | Westerwood | 1,250 | |
| 1997 | (Scotland) Alan Reid | 279 | 8 strokes | | Westerwood | 1,250 | |
| 1998 | (Scotland) Alastair Forsyth | 279 | 4 strokes | (Scotland) David Orr | Westerwood | 1,250 | |

The 1980 championship was played over 36 holes.
