= UAP European Under-25 Championship =

Tournament information
- Location: Sailly, Yvelines, France
- Established: 1988
- Course(s): Golf du Prieuré
- Tour(s): European Tour (approved special event)
- Format: Stroke play
- Final year: 1994

Tournament record score
- Aggregate: 272 Paul Lawrie (1992)

Final champion
- (England) Philip Talbot

The UAP European Under-25 Championship was a professional golf tournament for under-25 golfers which was played annually in France from 1988 to 1994, except in 1993. It was played at Golf du Prieuré, a course north-west of Paris.

It was an event on European Tour but prize money did not count towards the Order of Merit/Official Money List and a victory did not count as an official tour win; later such tournaments were designated as "approved special events". A similar event, the Cacharel World Under-25 Championship, was played in France for a number of years until 1983.

== Winners ==
Year	Winner	Score	Margin of victory	Runner(s)-up	Ref
1988	(France) Jean van de Velde	286	2 strokes	(England) Russell Claydon (a)	
1989	(Northern Ireland) Stephen Hamill	282	1 stroke	(England) Steven Bottomley	
1990	(England) Peter Baker	282 (−6)	3 strokes	(Wales) Neil Roderick	
1991	(Republic of Ireland) Paul McGinley	283 (−5)	1 stroke	(Wales) Paul Affleck (Denmark) René Michelsen	
1992	(Scotland) Paul Lawrie	272 (−16)	8 strokes	(France) Jan Dahlström (Sweden) Pierre Fulke	
1993	No tournament				
UAP Open
1994	(England) Philip Talbot	277 (−11)	1 stroke	(England) Neal Briggs	

(a) – Amateur
