= Arras Open Senior Hauts de France =

Tournament information
- Location: Anzin-Saint-Aubin, France
- Established: 2019
- Course: Arras Golf Resort
- Par: 72
- Length: 6,510 yards (5,950 m)
- Tour: European Senior Tour
- Format: Stroke play
- Prize fund: €200,000
- Month played: June
- Final year: 2019

Current champion
- (England) Peter Baker

Location map
- Location in France Location in Hauts-de-France

The Arras Open Senior Hauts de France is a men's senior (over 50) professional golf tournament on the European Senior Tour. It was held for the first time in June 2019 at Arras Golf Resort, Anzin-Saint-Aubin near Arras, France. Prize money was €200,000.

== Winners ==
Year	Winner	Score	To par	Margin of victory	Runner-up
2020	Cancelled due to the COVID-19 pandemic				
2019	(England) Peter Baker	203	−13	5 strokes	(South Africa) James Kingston
