= 2020 European Senior Tour =

Golf tour season

2020 European Senior Tour season

The 2020 European Senior Tour, titled as the 2020 Staysure Tour for sponsorship reasons, was intended to be the 29th season of the European Senior Tour, the main professional golf tour in Europe for men aged 50 and over.

== In-season changes ==
On 19 June, the European Tour announced that the entire 2020 season would be cancelled due to the COVID-19 pandemic.

== Schedule ==
The following table lists intended official events during the 2020 season.

| Date | Tournament | Host country |
|---|---|---|
| 16 May | Murhof Legends – Austrian Senior Open | Austria |
| 24 May | KitchenAid Senior PGA Championship | United States |
| 31 May | Senior Italian Open | Italy |
| 13 Jun | Arras Open Senior Hauts de France | France |
| 21 Jun | Farmfoods European Legends Links Championship | England |
| 28 Jun | U.S. Senior Open | United States |
| 26 Jul | The Senior Open Championship | England |
