= Miles Tunnicliff =

English golfer

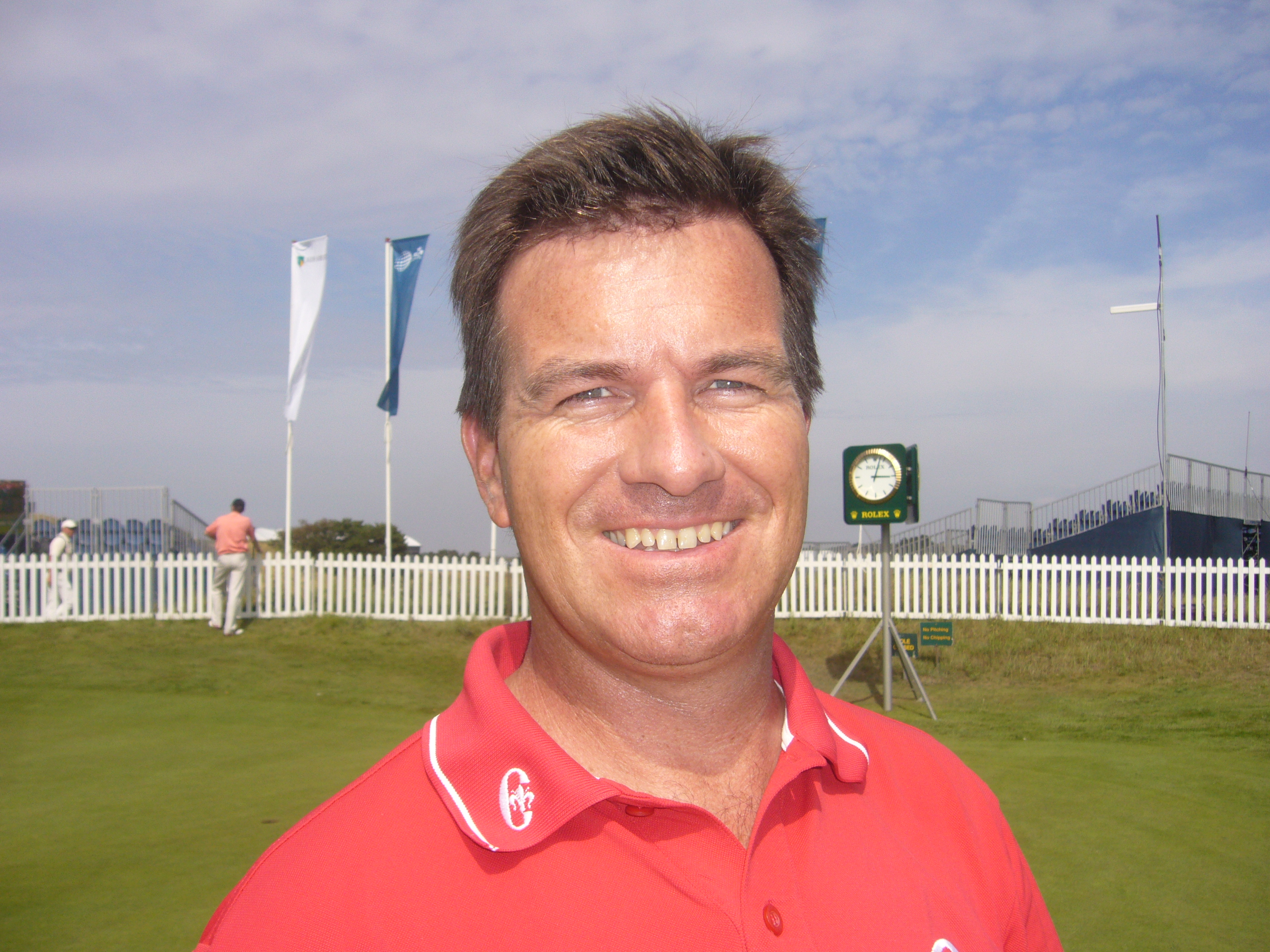
- KLM Open 2009

Personal information
- Full name: Miles Ian Tunnicliff
- Nationality: England
- Born: 30 July 1968 (age 58) Leamington Spa, England
- Height: 5 ft 7 in (1.70 m)

Career
- Sport: Golf
- Turned professional: 1989
- Current tour: MENA Golf Tour
- Former tours: European Tour; Challenge Tour; Asian Tour
- Professional wins: 4

Number of wins by tour
- European Tour: 2

Best results in major championships
- Masters Tournament: DNP
- PGA Championship: DNP
- U.S. Open: DNP
- The Open Championship: CUT: 2004

Miles Ian Tunnicliff (born 30 July 1968) is an English professional golfer.

== Career ==
Tunnicliff was born in Leamington Spa, Warwickshire. He turned professional in 1989 and after six years playing on the second tier Challenge Tour and several unsuccessful visits to the European Tour's qualifying school, he finally gained his European Tour card in 1995. He had a moderately successful rookie season, and maintained his playing privileges until 1999, when he had to go back to qualifying school.

Tunnicliff was unable to regain his tour card at qualifying school and after two more years playing on the Challenge Tour and in minor European Tour events, made his breakthrough with victory in the 2002 Great North Open just two weeks after the death of his mother from cancer. That win secured his place on the European Tour. Two years later he won his second tournament, the Diageo Championship at Gleneagles, and that season went on to record his best year-end ranking on the European Tour Order of Merit, 34th place. He also won the Mauritius Open in both 2004 and 2005. After losing his European Tour card in 2010 he played on the Asian Tour. After an injury in 2014, Tunnicliff started playing on the MENA Golf Tour.

== Professional wins (4) ==
=== European Tour wins (2) ===
No.	Date	Tournament	Winning score	Margin of victory	Runner-up
1	23 Jun 2002	Great North Open	−9 (72-70-68-69=279)	4 strokes	(Germany) Sven Strüver
2	13 Jun 2004	Diageo Championship at Gleneagles	−13 (67-68-72-68=275)	5 strokes	(Northern Ireland) Graeme McDowell

European Tour playoff record (0–1)

No.	Year	Tournament	Opponent	Result
1	2005	Holden New Zealand Open	(Sweden) Niclas Fasth	Lost to birdie on second extra hole

=== Other wins (2) ===
- 2004 Mauritius Open
- 2005 Mauritius Open

== Results in major championships ==
Tournament	2004
The Open Championship	CUT

Note: Tunnicliff only played in The Open Championship.
CUT = missed the half-way cut
