= Farmfoods European Legends Links Championship =

Men's senior professional golf tournament

Tournament information
- Location: Padstow, Cornwall, England
- Established: 2019
- Course: Trevose Golf & Country Club
- Par: 72
- Length: 6,259 yards (5,723 m)
- Tour: European Senior Tour
- Format: Stroke play
- Prize fund: €300,000
- Month played: June

Tournament record score
- Aggregate: 205 Paul Lawrie (2022)
- To par: −11 as above

Current champion
- (Scotland) Paul Lawrie

Location map
- Location in England Location in Cornwall

The Farmfoods European Legends Links Championship is a men's senior (over 50) professional golf tournament on the European Senior Tour. It was held for the first time in June 2019 at Trevose Golf & Country Club near Padstow, Cornwall, England. Prize money was €200,000.

== Winners ==
| Year | Winner | Score | To par | Margin of victory | Runner-up |
|---|---|---|---|---|---|
| 2022 | (Scotland) Paul Lawrie | 205 | −11 | 3 strokes | (Scotland) Euan McIntosh |
| 2021 | (South Africa) Chris Williams | 207 | −9 | 3 strokes | (Wales) Phillip Price |
| 2020 | Cancelled due to the COVID-19 pandemic | | | | |
| 2019 | (France) Jean-François Remésy | 206 | −10 | 1 stroke | (England) Barry Lane |
