= JCB Championship =

Tournament information
- Location: Rocester, Staffordshire, England
- Established: 2022
- Courses: JCB Golf & Country Club
- Par: 72
- Tour: European Senior Tour
- Format: Stroke play
- Prize fund: €1,000,000
- Month played: August
- Final year: 2023

Tournament record score
- Aggregate: 205 Alex Čejka
- To par: −11 as above

Final champion
- (England) Peter Baker

Location map
- Location in England Location in Staffordshire

The JCB Championship was a European Senior Tour golf tournament. It was first played in 2022 and was held at the JCB Golf & Country Club in Staffordshire.

== History ==
The tournament was hosted by Darren Clarke of Northern Ireland. Alex Čejka won the inaugural event ahead of Paul McGinley. The event returned in 2023, with Peter Baker beating Vijay Singh by one shot, with the tournament being shortened to 36 holes due to weather. The event did not return in 2024, with JCB Golf & Country Club hosting LIV Golf's UK event instead.

== Winners ==
Year	Winner	Score	To par	Margin of victory	Runner-up
2023	(England) Peter Baker	138 (Note: Shortened to 36 holes due to weather.)	−6	1 stroke	(Fiji) Vijay Singh
2022	(Germany) Alex Čejka	205	−11	2 strokes	(Republic of Ireland) Paul McGinley
