= Paul Lawrie =

Scottish golfer

Paul Lawrie OBE
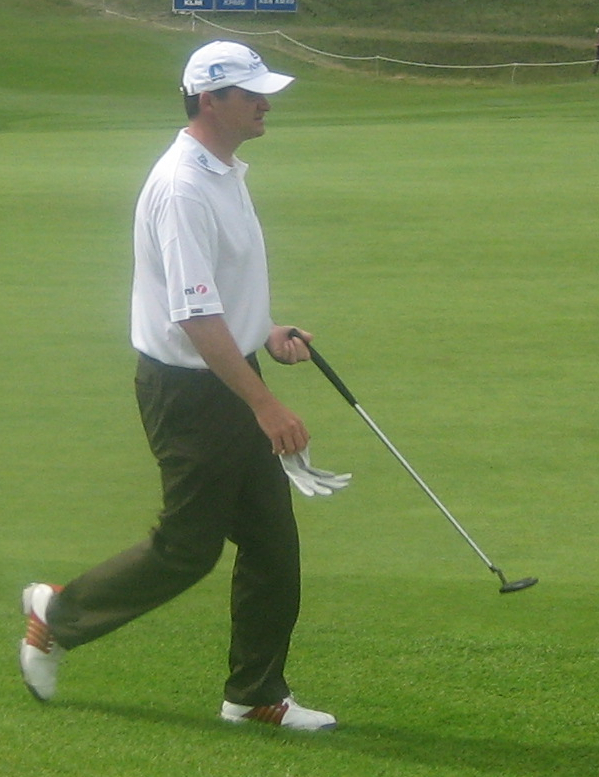

Personal information
- Full name: Paul Stewart Lawrie
- Nickname: Chippy
- Nationality: Scotland
- Born: 1 January 1969 (age 57) Aberdeen, Scotland
- Height: 5 ft 11 in (1.80 m)
- Weight: 196 lb (89 kg; 14.0 st)
- Spouse: Marian Giles
- Children: 3

Career
- Sport: Golf
- Turned professional: 1986
- Current tour: European Senior Tour
- Former tours: European Tour; PGA Tour
- Professional wins: 19
- Highest ranking: 26 (21 October 2012)

Number of wins by tour
- PGA Tour: 1
- European Tour: 8
- Sunshine Tour: 1
- European Senior Tour: 3
- Other: 7

Best results in major championships (wins: 1)
- Masters Tournament: T15: 2003
- PGA Championship: T34: 1999
- U.S. Open: T30: 2002
- The Open Championship: Won: 1999

Achievements and awards
- European Senior Tour Rookie of the Year: 2019

Paul Stewart Lawrie OBE (born 1 January 1969) is a Scottish professional golfer. He is best known for winning The Open Championship in 1999. He was a vice-captain for the European Ryder Cup team in 2016.

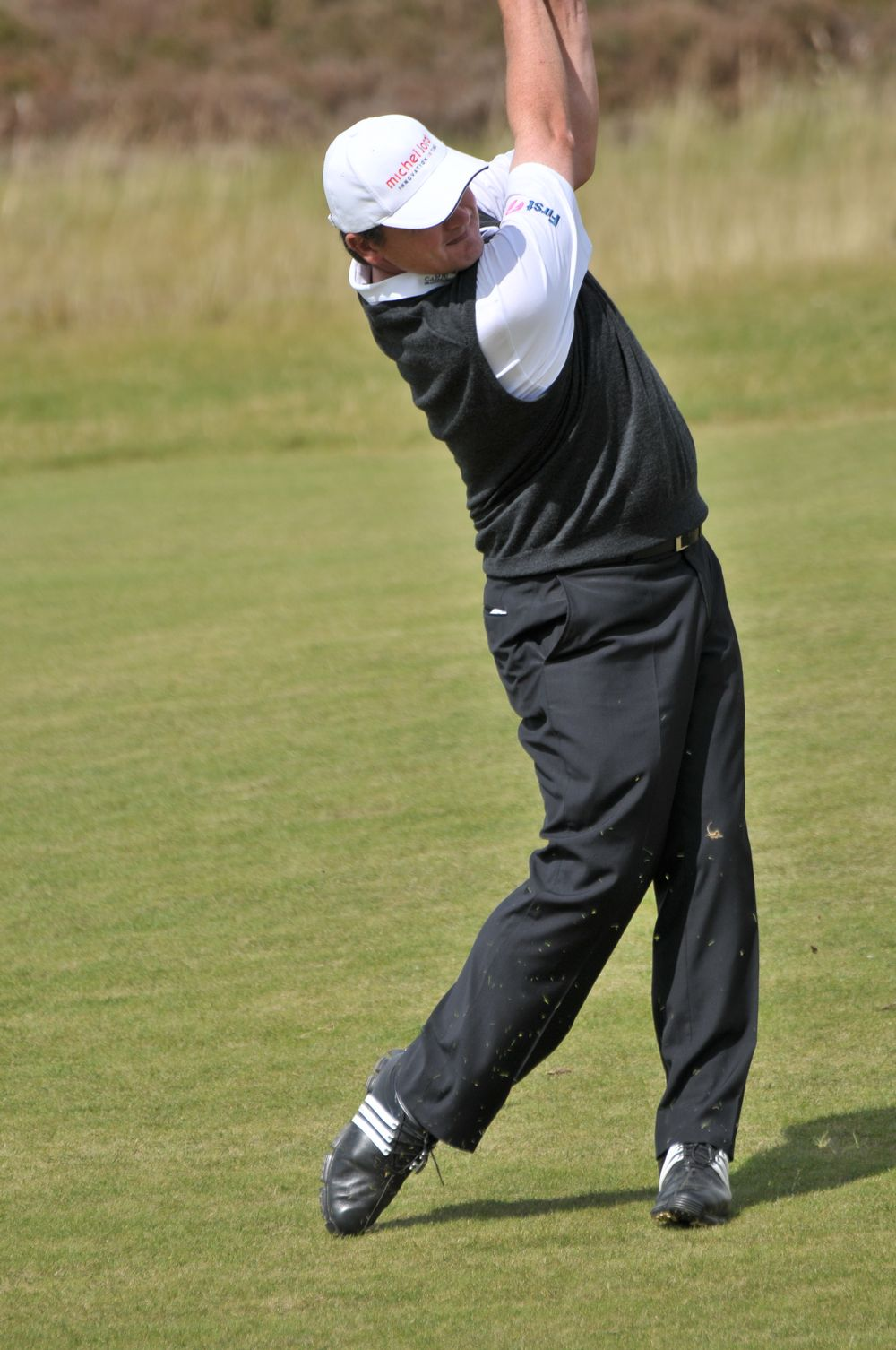
Lawrie at the Scottish Hydro Challenge

== Career ==
In 1969, Lawrie was born in Aberdeen, Scotland.

In 1986, Lawrie turned professional. in 1990, he won the Scottish Assistants' Championship at Cruden Bay by five strokes and the Scottish Under-25 Championship at Deer Park by seven strokes. In 1991, he won the Daily Express Scottish National Pro-am at Carnoustie by a stroke from Craig Maltman.

In 1992, Lawrie became a member of the European Tour. He performed steadily without doing much to draw attention to himself, aside from a 6th-place finish in the 1993 Open Championship. In his first seven seasons his only top 50 finish on the Order of Merit came in 1996 when he was 21st. However he also finished in the top 100 in all but one of the other six seasons, and picked up a debut tour win at the 1996 Catalan Open.

Lawrie's career was transformed in 1999. After winning the Qatar Masters (a European Tour event) early in the season, he went on to win the 1999 Open Championship at Carnoustie in July. This was the Open where the Frenchman Jean van de Velde blew a three-shot lead on the final hole. Lawrie won a four-hole playoff against Van de Velde and American Justin Leonard. An unusual aspect of Lawrie's victory was that he was neither leader nor co-leader at any time during his regulation 72 holes, only moving into a share of the lead when the leaders came back to him after he had completed his final round. Also, Lawrie came back from the largest third-round deficit ever faced by a major championship winner - going into the final day, he trailed the leader, Van de Velde, by ten shots. This is also the record for the biggest final-round comeback on the PGA Tour.

After his major championship victory, Lawrie's game shifted to a higher level without quite moving him into the global elite group of golfers. He finished 9th on the European Tour Order of Merit in 1999; 6th in 2001, when he captured the lucrative Dunhill Links Championship; and 10th in 2002, when he won his fifth European Tour title at the Celtic Manor Resort Wales Open.

In March 2001, the Paul Lawrie Foundation was created. The Foundation aims to support and sustain an interest and enthusiasm for the game of golf amongst under 18s. Activities are delivered in a fun and relaxed setting with equipment provided if necessary. The Foundation has grown rapidly and now includes football and hockey. In 2011, a 54-hole tournament, the Paul Lawrie Invitational was added to the Tartan Tour.

In 2000, due to his Open win, Lawrie became a member of the PGA Tour for several seasons, while also continuing to compete on the European Tour. He enjoyed little success in the U.S. and when his five-year major championship exemption expired at the end of the 2004 season, he lost his PGA Tour card.

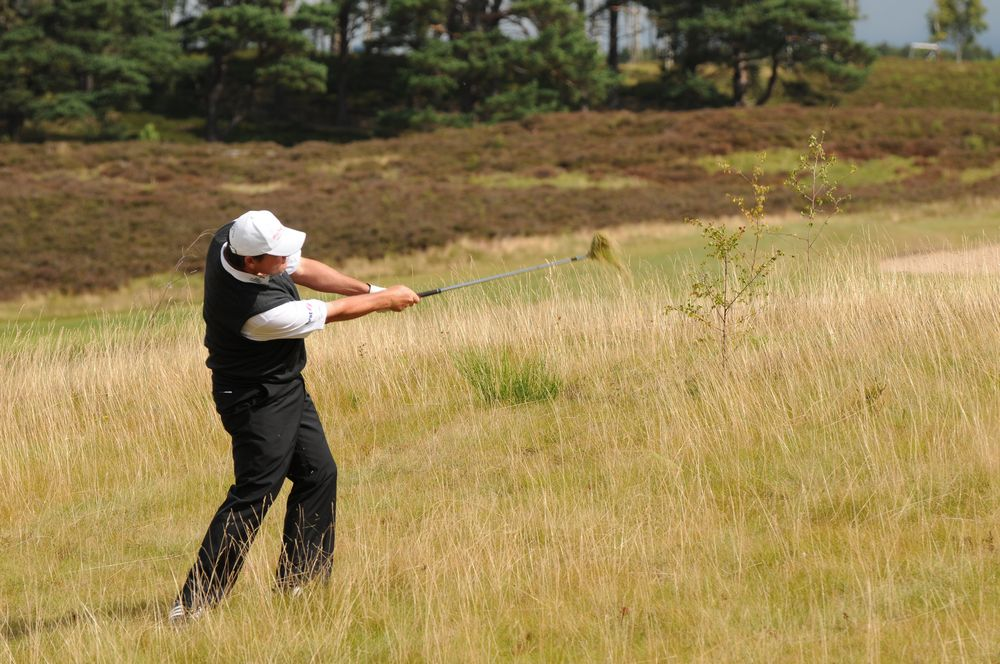
Lawrie comes out from the rough at the Scottish Hydro Challenge

Lawrie was the last European player to win a major until 2007, when that drought was ended by Pádraig Harrington of Ireland in The Open Championship. He was the last player from the United Kingdom to win a major until Graeme McDowell won the 2010 U.S. Open. Lawrie is still the last player from Scotland to win a major.

At the 2009 Open Championship at Turnberry, Lawrie scored what is believed to be only the eighth albatross (double eagle) in the competition's 150-year history by holing his second shot at the par 5 seventh hole in the final round.

On 27 March 2011, Lawrie won the Open de Andalucía de Golf by one stroke over Johan Edfors. Lawrie finished the championship at −12 and in doing so ended a nine-year period without a tour win.

In February 2012, Lawrie won the Commercialbank Qatar Masters for the second time in his career, having previously won in 1999. Lawrie became only the second player to have won the tournament more than once alongside Adam Scott. It was Lawrie's seventh win on the European Tour. The tournament was reduced to 54 holes after strong winds hampered the play during rounds one and two. He won by four strokes over Jason Day and Peter Hanson after a final round of 65.

Lawrie skipped the 2012 U.S. Open in an attempt to qualify for the 2012 Ryder Cup. He secured qualification with victory at the Johnnie Walker Championship at Gleneagles in August. He has stated that he would accept the captain's role for the 2014 Ryder Cup if offered. Lawrie helped Team Europe retain the Ryder Cup at Medinah. He finished the season in the top 10 of the Order of Merit for the first time in ten years.

On 1 October 2020, Lawrie announced that he would be retiring from the European Tour following his 620th career event at the Aberdeen Standard Investments Scottish Open due to back problems and would instead compete on the European Senior Tour moving forward.

Lawrie is passionate about junior golf and his Paul Lawrie Foundation has taught thousands of youngsters. In 2012 he bought Aspire Golf Centre in Aberdeen (now called the Paul Lawrie Golf Centre). Partly due to this, he was named by the Golf Club Managers' Association's Golf Club Management magazine as the 37th most powerful person in British golf. Lawrie is a fan of Aberdeen FC.

Lawrie was a columnist for bunkered golf magazine between 1999 and 2004.

Lawrie has his own golf brand, called Cardinal Golf.

In 2020, Lawrie founded the Tartan Pro Tour, a third-tier UK-based golf tour and feeder to the Challenge Tour that achieved OWGR status in May 2024. The Tartan Pro Tour was created to give players opportunities during the COVID-19 pandemic and to eventually replace the shuttered PGA EuroPro Tour in 2022.

== Personal life ==
Lawrie's son Craig is also a professional golfer.

== Awards and honors ==
- In 2000, Lawrie was appointed Member of the Order of the British Empire (MBE).
- In 2013, Lawrie earned Officer of the Order of the British Empire (OBE) in the 2013 Birthday Honours for voluntary service to golf.

== Professional wins (19) ==
=== PGA Tour wins (1) ===
Legend
Major championships (1)
Other PGA Tour (0)

No.	Date	Tournament	Winning score	Margin of victory	Runners-up
1	18 Jul 1999	The Open Championship	+6 (73-74-76-67=290)	Playoff	(United States) Justin Leonard, (France) Jean van de Velde

PGA Tour playoff record (1–0)

No.	Year	Tournament	Opponents	Result
1	1999	The Open Championship	(United States) Justin Leonard, (France) Jean van de Velde	Won four-hole aggregate playoff; Lawrie: E (5-4-3-3=15), Leonard: +3 (5-4-4-5=18), van de Velde: +3 (6-4-3-5=18)

=== European Tour wins (8) ===
Legend
Major championships (1)
Other European Tour (7)

No.	Date	Tournament	Winning score	Margin of victory	Runner(s)-up
1	3 Mar 1996	Catalan Open	−9 (65-70=135) (Note: Shortened to 36/54 holes due to weather.)	1 stroke	(Spain) Fernando Roca
2	20 Feb 1999	Qatar Masters	−20 (68-65-67-68=268)	7 strokes	(Denmark) Søren Kjeldsen, (Wales) Phillip Price
3	18 Jul 1999	The Open Championship	+6 (73-74-76-67=290)	Playoff	(United States) Justin Leonard, (France) Jean van de Velde
4	21 Oct 2001	Dunhill Links Championship	−18 (71-68-63-68=270)	1 stroke	(South Africa) Ernie Els
5	11 Aug 2002	Celtic Manor Resort Wales Open	−16 (67-65-70-70=272)	5 strokes	(England) John Bickerton
6	27 Mar 2011	Open de Andalucía de Golf	−12 (66-67-65-70=268)	1 stroke	(Sweden) Johan Edfors
7	5 Feb 2012	Commercialbank Qatar Masters (2)	−15 (69-67-65=201)	4 strokes	(Australia) Jason Day, (Sweden) Peter Hanson
8	26 Aug 2012	Johnnie Walker Championship at Gleneagles	−16 (68-69-67-68=272)	4 strokes	(Australia) Brett Rumford

European Tour playoff record (1–2)

No.	Year	Tournament	Opponents	Result
1	1999	The Open Championship	(United States) Justin Leonard, (France) Jean van de Velde	Won four-hole aggregate playoff; Lawrie: E (5-4-3-3=15), Leonard: +3 (5-4-4-5=18), van de Velde: +3 (6-4-3-5=18)
2	2001	Celtic Manor Resort Wales Open	(England) Daren Lee, (Republic of Ireland) Paul McGinley	McGinley won with par on fifth extra hole Lawrie eliminated by par on second hole
3	2003	Dunhill Championship	(England) Mark Foster, (Denmark) Anders Hansen, (South Africa) Trevor Immelman, (Scotland) Doug McGuigan, (South Africa) Bradford Vaughan	Foster won with eagle on second extra hole Hansen and McGuigan eliminated by birdie on first hole

=== Sunshine Tour wins (1) ===
No.	Date	Tournament	Winning score	Margin of victory	Runners-up
1	19 Feb 2017	Dimension Data Pro-Am	−15 (69-69-69-67=274)	1 stroke	(United States) Justin Hicks, (England) Chris Lloyd, (South Africa) Chris Swanepoel

Sunshine Tour playoff record (0–1)

No.	Year	Tournament	Opponents	Result
1	2003	Dunhill Championship	(England) Mark Foster, (Denmark) Anders Hansen, (South Africa) Trevor Immelman, (Scotland) Doug McGuigan, (South Africa) Bradford Vaughan	Foster won with eagle on second extra hole Hansen and McGuigan eliminated by birdie on first hole

=== Other wins (7) ===
- 1990 Scottish Assistants' Championship, Scottish Under-25 Championship
- 1991 Daily Express Scottish National Pro-am
- 1992 UAP European Under-25 Championship, Scottish PGA Championship
- 2002 Aberdeen Asset Management Scottish Match Play Championship
- 2005 Scottish PGA Championship

=== European Senior Tour wins (3) ===
No.	Date	Tournament	Winning score	Margin of victory	Runner(s)-up
1	18 Aug 2019	Scottish Senior Open	−2 (68-72-71=211)	2 strokes	(England) Peter Baker, (Australia) Peter Fowler
2	19 Jun 2022	Farmfoods European Legends Links Championship	−11 (64-71-70=205)	3 strokes	(Scotland) Euan McIntosh
3	16 Oct 2022	Farmfoods European Senior Masters	−17 (71-66-65=202)	Playoff	(Sweden) Michael Jonzon

European Senior Tour playoff record (1–1)

No.	Year	Tournament	Opponent	Result
1	2022	Jersey Legends	(Australia) Richard Green	Lost to par on third extra hole
2	2022	Farmfoods European Senior Masters	(Sweden) Michael Jonzon	Won with birdie on first extra hole

== Major championships ==
=== Wins (1) ===
Year	Championship	54 holes	Winning score	Margin	Runners-up
1999	The Open Championship	10 shot deficit	+6 (73-74-76-67=290)	Playoff^{1}	(United States) Justin Leonard, (France) Jean van de Velde

^{1}Defeated Leonard and van de Velde in 4-hole playoff: Lawrie (5-4-3-3=15), Leonard (5-4-4-5=18), van de Velde (6-4-3-5=18).

=== Results timeline ===
Results not in chronological order in 2020.

Tournament	1992	1993	1994	1995	1996	1997	1998	1999
Masters Tournament								
U.S. Open								
The Open Championship	T22	T6	T24	T58	CUT		CUT	1
PGA Championship								T34

Tournament	2000	2001	2002	2003	2004	2005	2006	2007	2008	2009
Masters Tournament	CUT	CUT	CUT	T15	T37					
U.S. Open		CUT	T30	CUT	CUT					
The Open Championship	CUT	T42	T59	CUT	CUT	T52	CUT	CUT	CUT	T47
PGA Championship	T72	CUT	CUT							

Tournament	2010	2011	2012	2013	2014	2015	2016	2017	2018
Masters Tournament			T24	T38					
U.S. Open				T32					
The Open Championship	CUT	T66	T34	T26	CUT	T40	T63	CUT	
PGA Championship			T48	CUT					

Tournament	2019	2020	2021	2022
Masters Tournament				
PGA Championship				
U.S. Open				
The Open Championship	CUT	NT		CUT

Win
Top 10
Did not play

CUT = missed the half-way cut
"T" indicates a tie for a place
NT = No tournament due to the COVID-19 pandemic

=== Summary ===
Tournament	Wins	2nd	3rd	Top-5	Top-10	Top-25	Events	Cuts made
Masters Tournament	0	0	0	0	0	2	7	4
PGA Championship	0	0	0	0	0	0	6	3
U.S. Open	0	0	0	0	0	0	5	2
The Open Championship	1	0	0	1	2	4	27	14
Totals	1	0	0	1	2	6	45	23

- Most consecutive cuts made – 7 (2011 Open Championship – 2013 Open Championship)
- Longest streak of top-10s – 1 (twice)

== Results in The Players Championship ==
Tournament	2000	2001	2002	2003	2004
The Players Championship	T73	CUT	CUT	T56	CUT

CUT = missed the halfway cut
"T" indicates a tie for a place

== Results in World Golf Championships ==
Results not in chronological order before 2015.

Tournament	1999	2000	2001	2002	2003	2004	2005	2006	2007	2008	2009	2010	2011	2012	2013	2014	2015	2016	2017
Championship	T37		NT^{1}	T54										T60	T58				
Match Play		QF	R32	R64	R64									R16	R64				
Invitational	T21			T65										T50	T27				T60
Champions													T49	T36					

^{1}Cancelled due to 9/11

Top 10
Did not play

QF, R16, R32, R64 = Round in which player lost in match play
"T" = Tied
Note that the HSBC Champions did not become a WGC event until 2009.

== Team appearances ==
- World Cup (representing Scotland): 1996, 2000, 2002, 2003
- Alfred Dunhill Cup (representing Scotland): 1999
- Ryder Cup (representing Europe): 1999, 2012 (winners)
- Seve Trophy (representing Great Britain & Ireland): 2000, 2002 (winners), 2003 (winners), 2013
- Royal Trophy (representing Europe): 2009, 2013 (winners)

== See also ==
- List of golfers with most European Tour wins
