= Jean van de Velde (golfer) =

French professional golfer (born 1966)

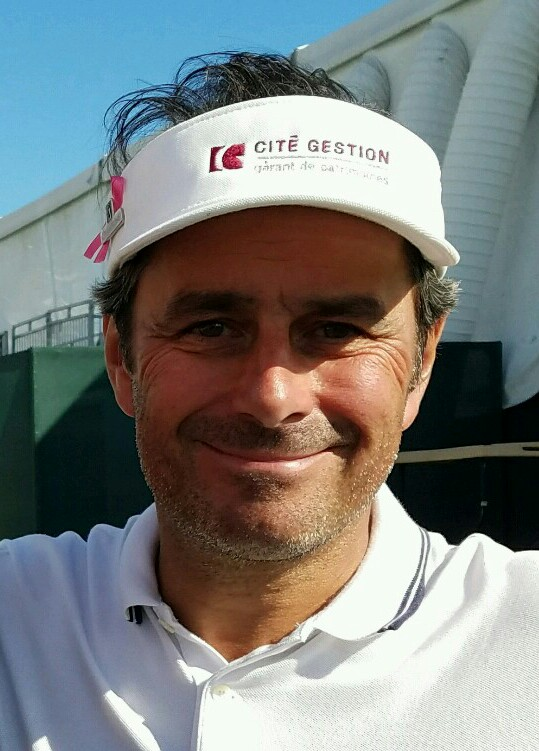
- Van de Velde in 2016

Personal information
- Full name: Jean van de Velde
- Nationality: France
- Born: 29 May 1966 (age 60) Mont-de-Marsan, France
- Height: 1.80 m (5 ft 11 in)
- Spouse: Jeovana
- Children: 4

Career
- Sport: Golf
- Turned professional: 1987
- Current tour: European Senior Tour
- Former tours: PGA Tour; European Tour
- Professional wins: 7
- Highest ranking: 70 (21 May 2000)

Number of wins by tour
- European Tour: 2
- Other: 5

Best results in major championships
- Masters Tournament: T19: 2000
- PGA Championship: T26: 1999
- U.S. Open: T45: 2002
- The Open Championship: T2: 1999

Jean van de Velde (born 29 May 1966) is a French professional golfer, who formerly played on the European Tour and the PGA Tour. He is best known for his runner-up finish at the 1999 Open Championship, where he lost a three-shot lead on the final hole.

== Early life and amateur career ==
Van de Velde was born in Mont-de-Marsan, Landes, France.

As an amateur he won both the French Youths Championship and the French Amateur Championship. He represented his country at the European Youths' Team Championship and also at the 1986 Eisenhower Trophy in Caracas, Venezuela, were his team finished tied 8th and van de Velde best French player, tied 11th individually.

== Professional career ==
Van de Velde turned professional in 1987 and his rookie season on the European Tour was 1989. His first European Tour win was the 1993 Roma Masters. He has twice finished in the top twenty of the Order of Merit.

He represented France twelve times in the World Cup and six times in the Alfred Dunhill Cup.

=== 1999 Open Championship ===
Van de Velde was ranked 152 in the world, and with only one previous European Tour victory, when he nearly achieved an upset victory at the 1999 Open Championship at Carnoustie. Going into the final round, he held a five shot lead over Justin Leonard and Craig Parry. Van de Velde arrived at the 18th tee with a three shot lead, needing only a double bogey six to become the first Frenchman since 1907 to win a major golf tournament. He had played error-free golf for much of the week and birdied the 18th hole in two previous rounds at the tournament.

Van de Velde chose to use his driver off the tee, and he drove the ball to the right of the burn, where he was lucky to find land. Rather than laying up and hitting the green with his third, Van de Velde decided to go for the green with his second shot. His shot drifted right, ricocheted backwards off the railings of the grandstands by the side of the green, landed on top of the stone wall of the Barry Burn and then bounced fifty yards backwards into knee-deep rough.

On his third shot, Van de Velde's club got tangled in the rough on his downswing, and his ball flew into the Barry Burn, a water hazard. He removed his shoes and socks and stepped through shin-deep water as he debated whether to try to hit his ball out of the Barry Burn, which guards the 18th green. Ultimately, he took a drop and then hit his fifth shot into the greenside bunker. Van de Velde shot to within six feet from the hole, and made the putt for a triple-bogey seven, dropping him into a three-way playoff with Justin Leonard and Paul Lawrie. Lawrie won the playoff.

The performance has become infamous in professional golf history. ESPN once called it the "biggest collapse" in golf, and in 2016 ranked it 13th on its list of 25 worst collapses in sports history. USA Today ranked it 4th in 2016 on its list of worst collapses in sports. His journey is profiled in the 2019 docu-series, "Losers," produced and aired on Netflix.

=== 1999 Ryder Cup ===
Van de Velde represented Europe, automatically selected by ranking points, at the 1999 Ryder Cup at The Country Club, Brookline, Massachusetts. European team captain Mark James chose not to play van de Velde (or other rookies Jarmo Sandelin and Andrew Coltart) on the first two days, and all three debuted during the single matches on the final day. Van de Velde, Sandelin and Coltart came to face the three, at the time, highest ranked U.S. players, Davis Love III, David Duval and Tiger Woods. All three lost, with Van de Velde losing 6 and 5 against Love. Team Europe lost the Ryder Cup 14^{1}/_{2}–13^{1}/_{2}, despite leading by four points going into the final day.

=== Later career ===
Van de Velde played on the PGA Tour in 2000 and 2001. He finished tied 2nd at the 2000 Touchstone Energy Tucson Open and 2nd at the 2000 Reno–Tahoe Open, losing in a play-off.

In the new millennium, Van de Velde was troubled by injuries for several years. He injured his knee while skiing in 2003, needing an operation. He made a comeback at the 2005 Open de France, where he lost a playoff to fellow Frenchman Jean-François Remésy after, once again, finding water on the last hole.

In 2006, he won his second European Tour title, 13 years after his first one, at the Madeira Island Open Caixa Geral de Depositos. With a three-stroke lead entering the last hole, van de Velde made a double bogey on the 72nd hole, but still finished with a 68 to win by a shot.

In 2016, van de Velde turned 50 and became eligible for senior tournaments, returning to Carnoustie for the 2016 Senior Open Championship, played to Carnoustie, site of his 1999 runner-up finish. Van de Velde missed the cut by nine shots after shooting 83–74.

In 2018, he played ten tournaments on the European Senior Tour, finishing 52nd on the Order of Merit.

== Affiliations ==
In 2012, he was named by UNICEF France as an ambassador – only the second French sportsman, after Lilian Thuram, to achieve this.

Since 2019, he has hosted the Legends Open de France hosted by Jean van de Velde, in 2021 and 2022 played at Golf de Saint-Cloud outside Paris.

== Amateur wins ==
- 1985 French Youths Championship
- 1986 French Youths Championship, French Native Amateur Championship

== Professional wins (7) ==
=== European Tour wins (2) ===
No.	Date	Tournament	Winning score	To par	Margin of victory	Runner-up
1	18 Apr 1993	Roma Masters	66-76-67-72=281	−7	Playoff	(New Zealand) Greg Turner
2	26 Mar 2006	Madeira Island Open Caixa Geral de Depositos	69-65-71-68=273	−15	1 stroke	(England) Lee Slattery

European Tour playoff record (1–2)

No.	Year	Tournament	Opponent(s)	Result
1	1993	Roma Masters	(New Zealand) Greg Turner	Won with par on third extra hole
2	1999	The Open Championship	(Scotland) Paul Lawrie, (United States) Justin Leonard	Lawrie won four-hole aggregate playoff; Lawrie: E (5-4-3-3=15), Leonard: +3 (5-4-4-5=18), van de Velde: +3 (6-4-3-5=18)
3	2005	Open de France	(France) Jean-François Remésy	Lost to double-bogey on first extra hole

=== Other wins (5) ===
- 1988 UAP European Under-25 Championship
- 1995 Grand Prix PGA France
- 1996 Grand Prix PGA France
- 1998 Championnat de France Pro
- 1999 Championnat de France Pro

== Playoff record ==
PGA Tour playoff record (0–2)

No.	Year	Tournament	Opponent(s)	Result
1	1999	The Open Championship	(Scotland) Paul Lawrie, (United States) Justin Leonard	Lawrie won four-hole aggregate playoff; Lawrie: E (5-4-3-3=15), Leonard: +3 (5-4-4-5=18), van de Velde: +3 (6-4-3-5=18)
2	2000	Reno–Tahoe Open	(United States) Scott Verplank	Lost to birdie on fourth extra hole

== Results in major championships ==
Tournament	1991	1992	1993	1994	1995	1996	1997	1998	1999
Masters Tournament									
U.S. Open									
The Open Championship	CUT		T34	T38			CUT		T2
PGA Championship									T26

Tournament	2000	2001	2002	2003	2004	2005	2006	2007	2008
Masters Tournament	T19								
U.S. Open	CUT		T45						
The Open Championship	T31	CUT				CUT			T19
PGA Championship	T30								

Top 10
Did not play

CUT = missed the half-way cut
"T" = tied

=== Summary ===
Tournament	Wins	2nd	3rd	Top-5	Top-10	Top-25	Events	Cuts made
Masters Tournament	0	0	0	0	0	1	1	1
U.S. Open	0	0	0	0	0	0	2	1
The Open Championship	0	1	0	1	1	2	9	5
PGA Championship	0	0	0	0	0	0	2	2
Totals	0	1	0	1	1	3	14	9

- Most consecutive cuts made – 3 (1999 Open Championship – 2000 Masters)
- Longest streak of top-10s – 1

== Results in The Players Championship ==
Tournament	2000	2001
The Players Championship	CUT	CUT

CUT = missed the halfway cut

== Results in World Golf Championships ==
Tournament	1999	2000	2001
Match Play			R16
Championship	T30		NT^{1}
Invitational	T36		

^{1}Cancelled due to 9/11

Top 10
Did not play

QF, R16, R32, R64 = Round in which player lost in match play
"T" = Tied
NT = No tournament

== Team appearances ==
Amateur

- European Youths' Team Championship (representing France): 1984
- Eisenhower Trophy (representing France): 1986
- St Andrews Trophy (representing the Continent of Europe): 1986

Professional

- World Cup (representing France): 1989, 1990, 1991, 1992, 1993, 1994, 1995, 1996, 1997, 1998, 2000, 2006
- Alfred Dunhill Cup (representing France): 1990, 1992, 1994, 1997, 1998, 1999
- Ryder Cup (representing Europe): 1999
- Seve Trophy (representing Continental Europe): 2000 (winners), 2011 (non-playing captain)
