= Council of National Golf Unions =

The Council of National Golf Unions (CONGU), originally the British Golf Unions Joint Advisory Committee, came into existence at a conference held in York on 14 February 1924. The conference was convened by The Royal and Ancient Golf Club of St Andrews as a means of enabling the representatives of the Golf Unions of Great Britain and Ireland to formulate a definitive system of calculating Scratch Scores and to arrive at a uniform system of handicapping based on Scratch Scores.

== Operation ==
The Consultative Committee was appointed to receive and consider schemes for calculating and allocating the Scratch Scores and adjustments to handicaps throughout Great Britain and Ireland. The Standard Scratch Score and Handicapping Scheme was prepared by the Council in 1925 and has been in operation throughout Great Britain and Ireland since 1 March 1926.

On 21 March 1960 the name was changed to the Council of National Golf Unions (CONGU) comprising representatives of The English Golf Union, The Golfing Union of Ireland, The Scottish Golf Union, The Welsh Golf Union and The Royal and Ancient Golf Club of St Andrews.

== Members ==
- England Golf – English men and women
- Golf Ireland – Irish men and women
- Scottish Golf – Scottish men and women
- Wales Golf – Welsh men and women
- The R&A – Rules of Golf Outside US and Mexico

Former members

- English Golf Union – English men
- English Women's Golf Association (formally the English Ladies' Golf Association) – English women
- Golfing Union of Ireland – Irish men
- Irish Ladies Golf Union – Irish women
- The Ladies' Golf Union
- Scottish Golf Union – Scottish men
- Scottish Ladies' Golf Association – Scottish women
