= Michael McLean (golfer) =

English golfer (born 1963)

Personal information
- Full name: Michael McLean
- Nationality: England
- Born: 6 March 1963 (age 63) Farnborough, Kent, England
- Height: 5 ft 9 in (1.75 m)
- Weight: 161 lb (73 kg; 11.5 st)

Career
- Sport: Golf
- Turned professional: 1981
- Current tour: European Seniors Tour
- Former tour: European Tour
- Professional wins: 4
- Highest ranking: 88 (23 February 1992)

Number of wins by tour
- European Tour: 1
- Other: 3

Best results in major championships
- Masters Tournament: DNP
- PGA Championship: DNP
- U.S. Open: DNP
- The Open Championship: T64: 1991

Michael McLean (born 6 March 1963) is an English professional golfer.

== Career ==
McLean was born in Farnborough, Kent. He turned professional in 1981 and played on the European Tour through most of the 1980s and 1990s. He made the top one hundred on the European Tour Order of Merit ten times with a best ranking of 20th in 1991. His sole European Tour win came at the 1990 Portuguese Open TPC.

== Professional wins (4) ==
=== European Tour wins (1) ===
No.	Date	Tournament	Winning score	Margin of victory	Runners-up
1	21 Oct 1990	Portuguese Open TPC	−14 (69-69-65-71=274)	1 stroke	(Scotland) Gordon Brand Jnr, (Australia) Mike Harwood

=== Other wins (3) ===
- 1983 Cacharel World Under-25 Championship
- 1994 Mauritius Open
- 2000 Mauritius Open

== Results in major championships ==
Tournament	1980	1981	1982	1983	1984	1985	1986	1987	1988	1989	1990	1991	1992
The Open Championship	CUT		CUT			CUT						T64	CUT

Note: McLean only played in The Open Championship.

Did not play

CUT = missed the half-way cut
"T" = tied

== Team appearances ==
Amateur

- Jacques Léglise Trophy (representing Great Britain & Ireland): 1980 (winners)
