= Peter Baker (golfer) =

English professional golfer (born 1967)

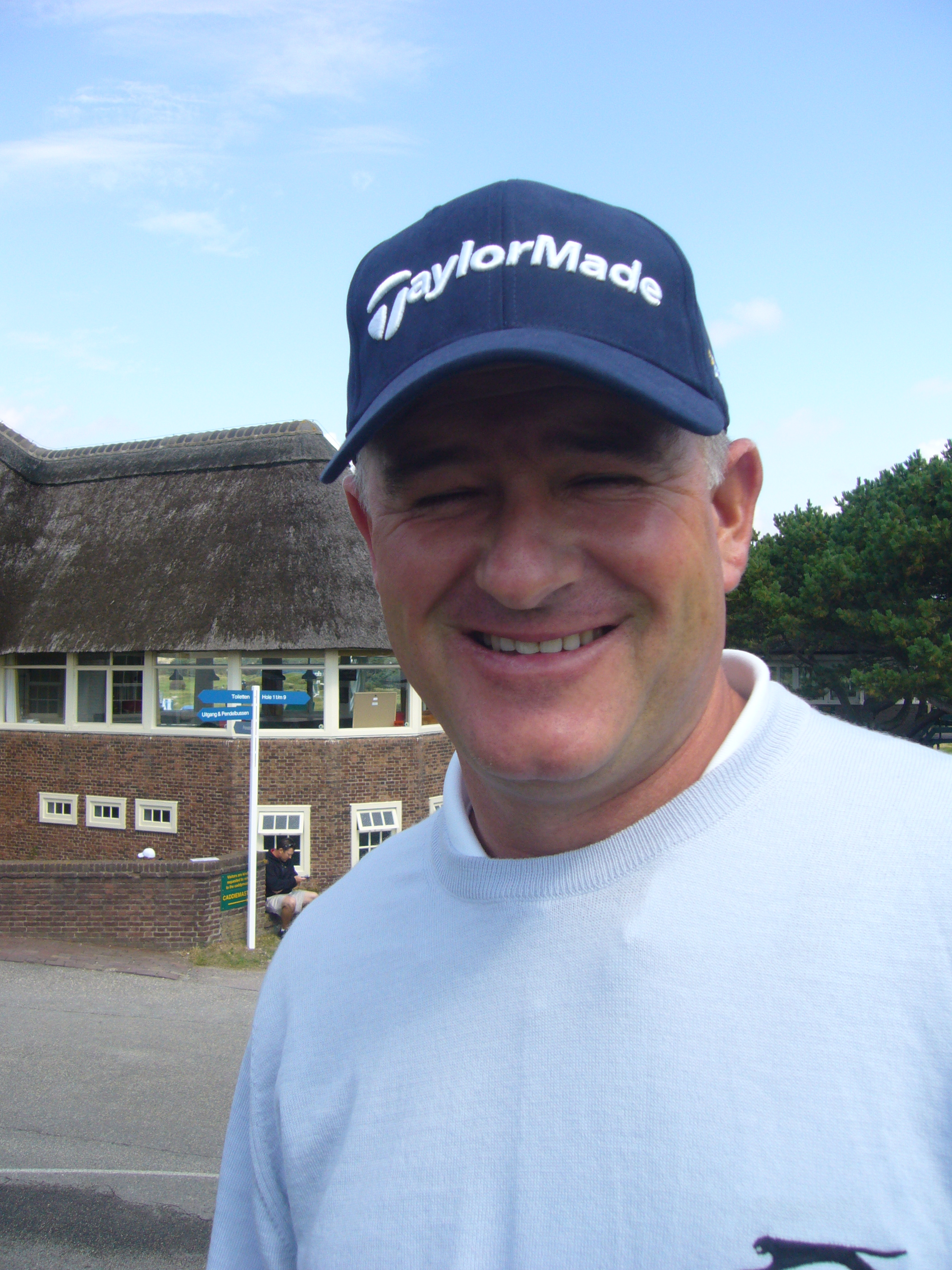

Personal information
- Full name: Peter Alan Baker
- Nationality: England
- Born: 7 October 1967 (age 59) Shifnal, Shropshire, England
- Height: 5 ft 9 in (1.75 m)
- Weight: 168 lb (76 kg; 12.0 st)
- Spouse: Helen (m. 1990)
- Children: 2

Career
- Sport: Golf
- Turned professional: 1986
- Current tour: European Senior Tour
- Former tours: European Tour; Challenge Tour
- Professional wins: 18
- Highest ranking: 54 (29 May 1994)

Number of wins by tour
- European Tour: 3
- Challenge Tour: 3
- European Senior Tour: 8 (Tied-8th all-time)
- Other: 4

Best results in major championships
- Masters Tournament: CUT: 1994
- PGA Championship: CUT: 1994
- U.S. Open: T39: 1994
- The Open Championship: T15: 1998

Achievements and awards
- Sir Henry Cotton Rookie of the Year: 1987
- European Senior Tour Order of Merit Winner: 2023

Peter Alan Baker (born 7 October 1967) is an English professional golfer. He had three wins on the European Tour, one in 1988 and two in 1993. He represented Europe in the 1993 Ryder Cup.

== Amateur career ==
Baker learned golf at his father's nine-hole Himley Hall course and was taught by Sandy Lyle's father Alex. In 1985, he was the joint winner of the Brabazon Trophy, after a tie with Roger Roper. He represented Great Britain & Ireland in the 1985 Walker Cup and turned professional the following year.

== Professional career ==
Baker was a consistent performer on the European Tour from the late 1980s until the early years of the new Millennium, with three tournament wins on the tour and a highest Order of Merit finish of seventh in 1993. His one Ryder Cup appearance for Europe came in the losing 1993 team. He won three of his four matches, winning two fourball matches, playing with Ian Woosnam, and beating Corey Pavin in the singles.

In 2007 Baker won two events on the second-tier Challenge Tour, the Credit Suisse Challenge and the Open AGF-Allianz Côtes d’Armor Bretagne on his 40th birthday. He also won the Mauritius Open at the end of 2007, beating José-Filipe Lima by three shots. In 2009 he had his third Challenge Tour success, winning the Credit Suisse Challenge for the second time.

Since reaching 50, he has played on the European Senior Tour. He won the 2019 Arras Open Senior Hauts de France, 5 strokes ahead of James Kingston.

Baker was one of Ian Woosnam's vice-captains at the 2006 Ryder Cup.

== Amateur wins ==
- 1983 Peter McEvoy Trophy, Carris Trophy
- 1985 Carris Trophy, Brabazon Trophy (tie with Roger Roper)

== Professional wins (18) ==
=== European Tour wins (3) ===
No.	Date	Tournament	Winning score	Margin of victory	Runner-up
1	7 Aug 1988	Benson & Hedges International Open	−17 (68-68-66-69=271)	Playoff	(England) Nick Faldo
2	6 Jun 1993	Dunhill British Masters	−22 (67-64-72-63=266)	7 strokes	(England) Carl Mason
3	1 Aug 1993	Scandinavian Masters	−10 (67-71-68-72=278)	Playoff	(Sweden) Anders Forsbrand

European Tour playoff record (2–0)

No.	Year	Tournament	Opponent	Result
1	1988	Benson & Hedges International Open	(England) Nick Faldo	Won with eagle on second extra hole
2	1993	Scandinavian Masters	(Sweden) Anders Forsbrand	Won with par on second extra hole

=== Challenge Tour wins (3) ===
No.	Date	Tournament	Winning score	Margin of victory	Runner-up
1	24 Jun 2007	Credit Suisse Challenge	−20 (72-67-66-67=272)	1 stroke	(Scotland) Andrew McArthur
2	7 Oct 2007	Open AGF-Allianz Côtes d'Armor Bretagne	−13 (64-67-65-71=267)	Playoff	(England) Ross McGowan
3	5 Jul 2009	Credit Suisse Challenge (2)	−18 (70-71-66-67=274)	1 stroke	(Austria) Florian Praegant

Challenge Tour playoff record (1–0)

No.	Year	Tournament	Opponent	Result
1	2007	Open AGF-Allianz Côtes d'Armor Bretagne	(England) Ross McGowan	Won with par on first extra hole

=== Other wins (4) ===
- 1990 UAP European Under-25 Championship
- 1994 Tournoi Perrier de Paris (with David J. Russell)
- 1998 Farmfoods British Par 3 Championship
- 2007 Mauritius Open

=== European Senior Tour wins (8) ===
Legend
Tour Championships (1)
Other European Senior Tour (7)

No.	Date	Tournament	Winning score	Margin of victory	Runner(s)-up
1	9 Jun 2019	Arras Open Senior Hauts de France	−13 (66-70-67=203)	5 strokes	(South Africa) James Kingston
2	25 Jun 2023	Irish Legends	−18 (66-63-69=198)	7 strokes	(Argentina) Ricardo González
3	5 Aug 2023	JCB Championship	−6 (69-69=138) (Note: Shortened to 36 holes due to weather.)	1 stroke	(Fiji) Vijay Singh
4	27 Aug 2023	Staysure PGA Seniors Championship	−12 (69-66-69-72=276)	6 strokes	(England) Greg Owen
5	10 Dec 2023	MCB Tour Championship	−15 (67-67-67=201)	1 stroke	(Australia) Peter Fowler, (Sweden) Patrik Sjöland
6	5 May 2024	Barbados Legends	−10 (67-67-69=203)	Playoff	(Australia) Scott Hend
7	8 Dec 2024	MCB Tour Championship (2)	−16 (70-62-68=200)	Playoff	(England) Simon Griffiths
8	14 Jun 2025	Costa Navarino Legends Tour Trophy	−16 (67-67-66=200)	6 strokes	(Germany) Thomas Gögele, (South Africa) James Kingston

European Senior Tour playoff record (2–1)

No.	Year	Tournament	Opponent	Result
1	2024	Barbados Legends	(Australia) Scott Hend	Won with birdie on first extra hole
2	2024	European Legends Cup	(Brazil) Adilson da Silva	Lost to birdie on first extra hole
3	2024	MCB Tour Championship	(England) Simon Griffiths	Won with birdie on third extra hole

== Results in major championships ==
Tournament	1988	1989	1990	1991	1992	1993	1994	1995	1996	1997	1998	1999
Masters Tournament							CUT					
U.S. Open							T39					CUT
The Open Championship	CUT	CUT	T63			T21	T55	T68		CUT	T15	T37
PGA Championship							CUT					

Tournament	2000	2001	2002	2003	2004	2005	2006	2007	2008	2009
Masters Tournament										
U.S. Open										
The Open Championship			CUT			CUT		CUT	CUT	CUT
PGA Championship										

Did not play

CUT = missed the half-way cut
"T" = tied

== Team appearances ==
Amateur

- Jacques Léglise Trophy (representing Great Britain & Ireland): 1983 (winners), 1984 (winners), 1985 (winners)
- European Boys' Team Championship (representing England: 1984, 1985 (winners)
- European Amateur Team Championship (representing England): 1985
- Walker Cup (representing Great Britain & Ireland): 1985
- St Andrews Trophy (representing Great Britain & Ireland): 1986 (winners)

Professional

- Ryder Cup (representing Europe): 1993
- Alfred Dunhill Cup (representing England): 1993, 1998
- World Cup (representing England): 1999

== See also ==
- 2007 Challenge Tour graduates
- 2009 Challenge Tour graduates
- List of golfers with most European Senior Tour wins
