= 1999 Open Championship =

Coordinates: 56.497°N 2.717°W

- Front cover of the 1999 Open Annual

Tournament information
- Dates: 15–18 July 1999
- Location: Angus, Scotland
- Course(s): Carnoustie Golf Links; Championship Course
- Organized by: The R&A
- Tour(s): PGA Tour; European Tour; Japan Golf Tour

Statistics
- Par: 71
- Length: 7,361 yards (6,731 m)
- Field: 156 players, 73 after cut
- Cut: 154 (+12)
- Prize fund: £2,000,000 €2,850,260 $3,058,500
- Winner's share: £350,000 €490,000 $577,500

Champion
- (Scotland) Paul Lawrie
- 290 (+6), playoff

Location in Scotland

The 1999 Open Championship was a men's major golf championship and the 128th Open Championship, held from 15 to 18 July at the Carnoustie Golf Links in Angus, Scotland.

Paul Lawrie won his only major championship in a playoff over Jean van de Velde and Justin Leonard. Lawrie, down by ten strokes at the start of the fourth round, completed the biggest final round comeback in major championship history, headlined by van de Velde's triple-bogey at the last hole.

== Course layout ==
Carnoustie Golf Links - Championship Course

Hole	Name	Yards	Par	Hole	Name	Yards	Par
1	Cup	407	4	10	South America	466	4
2	Gulley	462	4	11	Dyke	383	4
3	Jockie's Burn	342	4	12	Southward Ho	479	4
4	Hillocks	412	4	13	Whins	169	3
5	Brae	411	4	14	Spectacles	515	5
6	Long ^	578	5	15	Lucky Slap	472	4
7	Plantation	412	4	16	Barry Burn	250	3
8	Short	183	3	17	Island	459	4
9	Railway	474	4	18	Home	487	4
Out		3,681	36	In		3,680	35
Source:				Total		7,361	71

^ The 6th hole was renamed Hogan's Alley in 2003

Lengths of the course for previous Opens (since 1950):

- 1975: 7,065 yards (6,460 m), par 72
- 1968: 7,252 yards (6,631 m), par 72
- 1953: 7,200 yards (6,585 m), par 72
- 1937: 7,200 yards (6,585 m), par 72
- 1931: 6,701 yards (6,127 m), par 72

== Round summaries ==
=== First round ===
Thursday, 15 July 1999

Place	Player	Score	To par
1	(Australia) Rod Pampling	71	E
T2	(United States) Scott Dunlap	72	+1
T2	(Germany) Bernhard Langer	72	+1
T4	(United States) Dudley Hart	73	+2
T4	(Scotland) Paul Lawrie	73	+2
T4	(United States) Justin Leonard	73	+2
T4	(Zimbabwe) Mark McNulty	73	+2
T4	(United States) Len Mattiace	73	+2
T4	(United States) Steve Pate	73	+2
T4	(United States) Hal Sutton	73	+2

=== Second round ===
Friday, 16 July 1999

Place	Player	Score	To par
1	(France) Jean van de Velde	75-68=143	+1
2	(Argentina) Ángel Cabrera	75-69=144	+2
3	(Sweden) Jesper Parnevik	74-71=145	+3
T4	(Australia) Greg Norman	76-70=146	+4
T4	(Sweden) Patrik Sjöland	74-72=146	+4
T4	(United States) Tiger Woods	74-72=146	+4
T7	(Australia) Bradley Hughes	76-71=147	+5
T7	(Scotland) Paul Lawrie	73-74=147	+5
T7	(United States) Justin Leonard	73-74=147	+5
T7	(United States) Len Mattiace	73-74=147	+5
T7	(United States) Brian Watts	74-73=147	+5

Amateurs: Donald (+14), Gribben (+18), Storm (+19), Scotland (+21).

=== Third round ===
Saturday, 17 July 1999

Place	Player	Score	To par
1	(France) Jean van de Velde	75-68-70=213	E
T2	(United States) Justin Leonard	73-74-71=218	+5
T2	(Australia) Craig Parry	76-75-67=218	+5
T4	(Scotland) Andrew Coltart	74-74-72=220	+7
T4	(South Africa) David Frost	80-69-71=220	+7
T4	(United States) Tiger Woods	74-72-74=220	+7
T7	(Argentina) Ángel Cabrera	75-69-77=221	+8
T7	(Australia) Greg Norman	76-70-75=221	+8
T9	(Germany) Bernhard Langer	72-77-73=222	+9
T9	(Spain) Miguel Ángel Martín	74-76-72=222	+9
T9	(United States) Len Mattiace	73-74-75=222	+9
T9	(Scotland) Colin Montgomerie	74-76-72=222	+9
T9	(New Zealand) Frank Nobilo	76-76-70=222	+9

=== Final round ===
Sunday, 18 July 1999

Paul Lawrie completed the biggest final round comeback in major championship and PGA Tour history by coming back from 10 strokes behind in the final round, and winning the subsequent three-man playoff.

Jean van de Velde started the day with a five-stroke lead over Craig Parry and Justin Leonard, but trailed Parry by a stroke at the 12th hole, as Parry was −3 for the day through 11, while Van de Velde was +3. However, Parry could not escape the thick rough on the 12th hole on his way to a triple bogey while Van de Velde regained sole possession of the lead with a bogey. Parry then bogeyed 13, drove into the fairway bunker at 14 to deny himself a birdie chance, and missed a two-foot (0.6 m) putt on 17 en route to a double bogey. He holed a bunker shot on 18 to finish one stroke out of the playoff.

In the meantime, Leonard tied van de Velde for the lead with a birdie on 14, but made bogeys at 15 and 18 as his second shot landed in the Barry Burn as Van de Velde birdied 14 - leaving him three strokes behind, tied with Lawrie in the clubhouse at 6-over-par. Ángel Cabrera had a chance to join the clubhouse lead but narrowly missed a birdie putt on 18.

After the birdie on 14, Van de Velde missed the next three greens but got up-and-down each time to give himself a three stroke lead going into 18.

==== Van de Velde's collapse ====
Van de Velde, who was in control through the latter half of the championship, held a seemingly insurmountable three-stroke lead going into the 72nd hole. Despite the three-stroke lead van de Velde had going into the final hole, his name had not already been engraved into the Claret Jug, according to engraver Alex Harvey: "No, I didn't start engraving the Jug with his name. I've got to wait until the secretary hands me a slip of paper with the winner's name on it, and they always wait until the last putt is dropped."

Van de Velde teed off with a driver, which was heavily criticised by the ABC broadcast team, and pushed his shot far to the right, over the water bordering the right side of the 18th fairway, and onto the 17th hole. He later claimed that he thought the lead was only two strokes, which is why he chose not to go with a safe club, such as an iron. Choosing not to simply lay up with a wedge, van de Velde went for the green on his second shot with a two iron. His second shot came to rest in an area of knee-deep rough after his ball bounced backward 50 yards off the grandstand next to the 18th green and off a rock in the Barry Burn. Had the ball stayed in the grandstand he would have been able to drop without penalty. Then the thick Carnoustie grass stifled him again, as his third shot went into the burn in front of the green. Van de Velde took his shoes and socks off and entered the burn, considering an attempt to play the ball from the water. He decided against it and instead took a drop (fourth stroke), at which point he hit his fifth shot into one of the deep greenside bunkers. He pitched out safely and holed the six-foot putt on his seventh shot for a triple-bogey, which would trigger a three-man playoff between van de Velde, Lawrie, and Leonard. Van de Velde's play on this hole is still widely considered to be the worst "choke" in golfing history, and some have even used the term "pulling a van de Velde" to describe similar events.

Place	Player	Score	To par	Money (£)
T1	(Scotland) Paul Lawrie	73-74-76-67=290	+6	Playoff
T1	(United States) Justin Leonard	73-74-71-72=290	+6	Playoff
T1	(France) Jean van de Velde	75-68-70-77=290	+6	Playoff
T4	(Argentina) Ángel Cabrera	75-69-77-70=291	+7	100,000
T4	(Australia) Craig Parry	76-75-67-73=291	+7	100,000
6	(Australia) Greg Norman	76-70-75-72=293	+9	70,000
T7	(South Africa) David Frost	80-69-71-74=294	+10	50,000
T7	(United States) Davis Love III	74-74-77-69=294	+10	50,000
T7	(United States) Tiger Woods	74-72-74-74=294	+10	50,000
T10	(United States) Hal Sutton	73-78-72-72=295	+11	34,800
T10	(United States) Scott Dunlap	72-77-76-70=295	+11	34,800
T10	(United States) Jim Furyk	78-71-76-70=295	+11	34,800
T10	(South Africa) Retief Goosen	76-75-73-71=295	+11	34,800
T10	(Sweden) Jesper Parnevik	74-71-78-72=295	+11	34,800

==== Scorecard ====
Final round

Hole	1	2	3	4	5	6	7	8	9	10	11	12	13	14	15	16	17	18
Par	4	4	4	4	4	5	4	3	4	4	4	4	3	5	4	3	4	4
(Scotland) Lawrie	+10	+10	+9	+9	+10	+9	+9	+8	+8	+8	+8	+7	+8	+7	+7	+7	+6	+6
(United States) Leonard	+5	+5	+5	+5	+5	+4	+4	+4	+4	+5	+5	+5	+5	+4	+5	+5	+5	+6
(France) van de Velde	E	+1	+2	+2	+2	+2	+2	+3	+2	+2	+3	+4	+4	+3	+3	+3	+3	+6
(Argentina) Cabrera	+8	+8	+7	+7	+7	+7	+7	+7	+7	+7	+6	+6	+7	+7	+7	+7	+7	+7
(Australia) Parry	+5	+5	+4	+4	+4	+4	+4	+3	+3	+2	+2	+5	+6	+6	+6	+6	+8	+7
(Australia) Norman	+8	+8	+8	+9	+10	+10	+10	+10	+10	+10	+10	+9	+9	+8	+8	+8	+8	+9
(South Africa) Frost	+8	+10	+9	+10	+12	+11	+10	+10	+10	+10	+10	+11	+10	+9	+9	+10	+10	+10
(United States) Love	+12	+11	+11	+10	+10	+10	+9	+10	+11	+12	+11	+12	+11	+10	+10	+11	+11	+10
(United States) Woods	+7	+7	+7	+7	+7	+7	+7	+7	+7	+7	+7	+9	+9	+8	+9	+9	+9	+10

Cumulative tournament scores, relative to par

Birdie	Bogey	Double bogey	Triple bogey+

==== Playoff ====
The four-hole aggregate playoff was played on the final four holes (#15-18), three par fours and one par three (#16). All three players hit poor drives on the first playoff hole. Van de Velde was forced to take an unplayable and took double bogey to fall one stroke behind Lawrie and Leonard who both had bogeys. All three players missed the green on the second playoff hole and took bogeys. On the third playoff hole, Van de Velde made birdie to briefly create a three-way tie, but Lawrie followed with a birdie of his own to take a one-stroke lead into the final playoff hole. On the final playoff hole, Van de Velde found the rough and Leonard found the water en route to bogeys while Lawrie hit a 4-iron to four feet for a clinching birdie and the championship.

Place	Player	Score	To par	Money (£)
1	(Scotland) Paul Lawrie	5-4-3-3=15	E	350,000
T2	(United States) Justin Leonard	5-4-4-5=18	+3	185,000
T2	(France) Jean van de Velde	6-4-3-5=18	+3	185,000

===== Scorecard =====
Hole	15	16	17	18
Par	4	3	4	4
(Scotland) Lawrie	+1	+2	+1	E
(United States) Leonard	+1	+2	+2	+3
(France) van de Velde	+2	+3	+2	+3

Cumulative playoff scores, relative to par
