= England Golf =

Sports governing body in England

- Sport: Golf
- Founded: 1924
- Affiliation: The R&A; Ladies' Golf Union
- Headquarters: National Golf Centre, Woodhall Spa, Lincolnshire

Official website
- www.englandgolf.org
- (England)

England Golf is the governing body for male and female amateur golf in England. It represents over 1,900 golf clubs with over 740,000 members and is affiliated to The R&A, the joint global governing body of golf. It was formed in 2012 as a merger between the English Golf Union, the governing body for men, and the English Women's Golf Association, the equivalent body for women. England Golf is a member of Council of National Golf Unions (CONGU).

== History ==
The English Golf Union was founded in 1924 and is based at the National Golf Centre in Woodhall Spa, Lincolnshire. It was run as a non-profit-making organisation and is funded mainly by affiliation fees paid by golfers as part of their club membership fee. The English Women's Golf Association was founded in 1952 as an offshoot of the Ladies Golf Union (LGU), and handled local events, the handicapping system and liaised with golf clubs. The EWGA was also responsible for promoting golf to girls and women in England.

The two organisations decided to merge in 2011, in order to better promote the game in England, increase the commercial appeal of the amateur game, and increase equality in the sport. County unions of both organisations overwhelmingly voted in favour of the merger, which took effect from the beginning of 2012. The move also allowed Sport England to provide £13 million of annual funding from 2013, which can be used to increase participation. England Golf continues to be run as a non-profit organisation, funded from affiliation fees and government grants.

== Responsibilities ==
England Golf is responsible for the general promotion and administration of amateur golf within England. It organises individual and team championships for all age groups, and has inherited the running of the premier events from the male and female unions, including the English Amateur Championship (a match play event), and the English Open Amateur Stroke Play Championship (Brabazon Trophy). The larger all-Britain and Ireland events for men and women remain run by The R&A and the Ladies Golf Union respectively. It also administers the handicapping system for golf in England and works to increase the interest and participation in golf among adults and juniors.

== See also ==
- The Professional Golfers' Association
