= 2002 Open Championship =

Coordinates: 56.043°N 2.823°W

Tournament information
- Dates: 18–21 July 2002
- Location: Gullane, Scotland
- Course: Muirfield Golf Links
- Tour(s): European Tour; PGA Tour; Japan Golf Tour

Statistics
- Par: 71
- Length: 7,034 yards (6,432 m)
- Field: 156 players, 83 after cut
- Cut: 144 (+2)
- Prize fund: £3,800,000 €5,947,076 $6,004,760
- Winner's share: £700,000 €1,095,514 $1,106,140

Champion
- (South Africa) Ernie Els
- 278 (−6), playoff

Location in Scotland

The 2002 Open Championship was a men's major golf championship and the 131st Open Championship, held from 18 to 21 July at Muirfield Golf Links in Gullane, East Lothian, Scotland. Ernie Els won his first Claret Jug and third major title in a playoff over Stuart Appleby, Steve Elkington, and ultimately in a sudden-death playoff over Thomas Levet.

Tiger Woods' bid for the Grand Slam came to a halt on Saturday with the worst round of his career up to that time, an 81 (+10) in cold, gusty rain. It took him and others out of contention, but he rebounded on Sunday with a six-under 65 and finished at even par, six strokes back. Woods was the first in thirty years to win the first two legs (Masters, U.S. Open), last done by Jack Nicklaus in 1972. Nicklaus' grand slam bid also ended at Muirfield, runner-up by one stroke to Lee Trevino in 1972. The only one to win the first three was Ben Hogan in 1953. Entering the championship, Woods had won seven of the previous eleven majors.

== Course ==
| Hole | 1 | 2 | 3 | 4 | 5 | 6 | 7 | 8 | 9 | Out | 10 | 11 | 12 | 13 | 14 | 15 | 16 | 17 | 18 | In | Total |
|---|---|---|---|---|---|---|---|---|---|---|---|---|---|---|---|---|---|---|---|---|---|
| Yards | 448 | 351 | 378 | 213 | 560 | 468 | 185 | 443 | 508 | 3,554 | 475 | 389 | 381 | 191 | 448 | 415 | 186 | 546 | 449 | 3,480 | 7,034 |
| Par | 4 | 4 | 4 | 3 | 5 | 4 | 3 | 4 | 5 | 36 | 4 | 4 | 4 | 3 | 4 | 4 | 3 | 5 | 4 | 35 | 71 |

Lengths of the course for previous Opens (since 1950):

- 1992: 6,970 yards (6,370 m), par 71
- 1987: 6,963 yards (6,367 m), par 71
- 1980: 6,926 yards (6,333 m), par 71
- 1972: 6,892 yards (6,302 m), par 71
- 1966: 6,887 yards (6,297 m), par 71
- 1959: 6,806 yards (6,223 m), par 72

== Field ==
1. Top 15 and ties from the 2001 Open Championship

Billy Andrade (4), Alex Čejka, Darren Clarke (4,5,18), David Duval (2,3,4,13,14,18), Ernie Els (4,5,10,14), Niclas Fasth (4,5,18), Sergio García (4,14,18), Retief Goosen (4,5,10), Mikko Ilonen, Raphaël Jacquelin, Miguel Ángel Jiménez (5), Bernhard Langer (4,5,18), Billy Mayfair, Colin Montgomerie (4,5,6,18), Jesper Parnevik (4,18), Loren Roberts, Vijay Singh (4,11,12,14), Des Smyth, Kevin Sutherland (4), Ian Woosnam (5)

2. Open Champions, 1992–2001

John Daly (3,4), Nick Faldo (3), Paul Lawrie (3,5), Tom Lehman (3,4,14), Justin Leonard (3,4), Greg Norman (3), Mark O'Meara (3,11), Nick Price (3,4), Tiger Woods (3,4,10,11,12,13,14,18)

3. Past Open Champions aged 65 or under on 21 July 2002

Mark Calcavecchia (4,14,18), Sandy Lyle, Tom Watson

- Seve Ballesteros withdrew.
- Ian Baker-Finch, Tony Jacklin, Johnny Miller, Jack Nicklaus, Bill Rogers, Lee Trevino, and Tom Weiskopf did not enter.

4. The first 50 players on the OWGR on 30 May 2002

Robert Allenby (14), Thomas Bjørn (5,18), Ángel Cabrera (5), Michael Campbell (5), Stewart Cink (18), José Cóceres, John Cook, Chris DiMarco (14), Bob Estes (14), Brad Faxon (14), Jim Furyk (14,18), Pádraig Harrington (5,18), Dudley Hart, Scott Hoch (14,18), Toshimitsu Izawa (23), Shingo Katayama (23), Jerry Kelly, Matt Kuchar, Davis Love III (12,14,18), Shigeki Maruyama, Len Mattiace, Scott McCarron, Paul McGinley (5,18), Rocco Mediate, Phil Mickelson (14,18), José María Olazábal (11), Adam Scott (5), David Toms (12,14,18), Scott Verplank (14,18,19), Mike Weir (14)

- Paul Azinger (18) and Kenny Perry did not play.

5. Top 20 in the final 2001 European Tour Order of Merit

Mathias Grönberg, David Howell, Robert Karlsson, Thomas Levet, Peter O'Malley (22)

6. The Volvo PGA Championship winners for 1999–2002

Anders Hansen, Andrew Oldcorn

7. First 5 players, not exempt, in the top 20 of the 2002 European Tour Order of Merit as of 30 May

Barry Lane, Malcolm MacKenzie, Greg Owen, Carl Pettersson, Eduardo Romero

8. First 7 European Tour members, not exempt, in the top 25 of a cumulative money list taken from all official European Tour events from the 2002 Volvo PGA Championship up to and including the 2002 Scottish Open

Roger Chapman, Bradley Dredge, Gary Evans, Darren Fichardt, Søren Hansen, Freddie Jacobson, Ian Poulter

9. The leading 8 players, not exempt having applied (8) above, in the 2002 Scottish Open

Warren Bennett, John Bickerton, Paul Casey, Marc Farry, Ricardo González, Stephen Leaney, Jean-François Remésy, Jamie Spence

10. The U.S. Open Champions for 1993–2002

Lee Janzen, Steve Jones, Corey Pavin

11. The Masters Champions for 1998–2002

12. The PGA Champions for 1997–2001

13. The Players Champions for 1999–2002

Craig Perks, Hal Sutton (18)

14. Top 20 in the final 2001 PGA Tour Official Money List

Joe Durant, Frank Lickliter

15. First 5 players, not exempt, in the top 20 of the 2002 PGA Tour Official Money List as of 30 May

K. J. Choi

16. First 7 PGA Tour members, not exempt, in the top 25 of a cumulative money list taken from the 2002 Players Championship and the five PGA Tour events leading up to and including the 2002 Western Open

Stephen Ames, Jim Carter, Jonathan Kaye, Peter Lonard, Jeff Maggert, Tim Petrovic, Chris Smith

17. The leading 8 players, not exempt having applied (16) above, in the 2002 Western Open

Stuart Appleby, Neal Lancaster, John Riegger, Chris Riley, Steve Stricker, Bob Tway, Duffy Waldorf

- Brandt Jobe did not play.

18. Players selected to the 2001 Ryder Cup teams

Pierre Fulke, Phillip Price, Lee Westwood

19. The 2001 Canadian Open Champion

20. The 2001 Japan Open Champion

Taichi Teshima

21. Winner of the 2001 Asian PGA Tour Order of Merit

Thongchai Jaidee

22. Top 3 from the 2001–02 PGA Tour of Australasia Order of Merit as of 30 May

Scott Laycock, Craig Parry

23. Top 3 from the 2001 Japan Golf Tour Order of Merit

Dean Wilson

24. Top 2 from the 2001–02 Sunshine Tour Order of Merit

Tim Clark, Justin Rose

25. The leading player, not exempt, in the 2002 Mizuno Open

Kiyoshi Miyazato

26. First 4, not exempt having applied (25) above, in the top 20 of a cumulative money list taken from all official Japan Golf Tour events from the 2002 Japan PGA Championship up to and including the 2002 Mizuno Open

Kenichi Kuboya, Tsuneyuki Nakajima, Toru Suzuki, Toru Taniguchi

27. The 2001 Senior British Open Champion

Ian Stanley

28. The 2002 Amateur Champion

Alejandro Larrazábal (a)

29. The 2001 U.S. Amateur Champion

- Bubba Dickerson forfeited his exemption by turning professional.

30. The 2001 European Amateur Champion

- Stephen Browne forfeited his exemption by turning professional.

Final Qualifying (Sunday 14 July and Monday 15 July)
Dunbar – Luke Donald, Mattias Eliasson, Steve Elkington, Ian Garbutt, Patrik Sjöland, Esteban Toledo, Simon Young (a)
Gullane No. 1 – Fredrik Andersson, Gary Emerson, Richard Green, James Kingston, Adam Mednick, Raymond Russell, John Senden
Luffness New – Peter Baker, Benn Barham, Andrew Coltart, Paul Eales, John Kemp (a), Jarrod Moseley, Magnus Persson Atlevi
North Berwick – Matthew Cort, Scott Henderson, Trevor Immelman, Paul Mayoh, David Park, Roger Wessels, Tom Whitehouse

== Round summaries ==
=== First round ===
Thursday, 18 July 2002

| Place | Player | Score | To par |
|---|---|---|---|
| T1 | (Sweden) Carl Pettersson | 67 | −4 |
| T1 | (United States) David Toms | 67 | −4 |
| T1 | (United States) Duffy Waldorf | 67 | −4 |
| T4 | (Trinidad and Tobago) Stephen Ames | 68 | −3 |
| T4 | (Denmark) Thomas Bjørn | 68 | −3 |
| T4 | (Denmark) Søren Hansen | 68 | −3 |
| T4 | (United States) Steve Jones | 68 | −3 |
| T4 | (Scotland) Sandy Lyle | 68 | −3 |
| T4 | (Japan) Shigeki Maruyama | 68 | −3 |
| T4 | (United States) Len Mattiace | 68 | −3 |
| T4 | (United States) Phil Mickelson | 68 | −3 |
| T4 | (Zimbabwe) Nick Price | 68 | −3 |
| T4 | (France) Jean-François Remésy | 68 | −3 |
| T4 | (England) Justin Rose | 68 | −3 |
| T4 | (Republic of Ireland) Des Smyth | 68 | −3 |

=== Second round ===
Friday, 19 July 2002

| Place | Player | Score | To par |
|---|---|---|---|
| T1 | (South Africa) Ernie Els | 70-66=136 | −6 |
| T1 | (Republic of Ireland) Pádraig Harrington | 69-67=136 | −6 |
| T1 | (Japan) Shigeki Maruyama | 68-68=136 | −6 |
| T1 | (United States) Bob Tway | 70-66=136 | −6 |
| T1 | (United States) Duffy Waldorf | 67-69=136 | −6 |
| T6 | (Denmark) Søren Hansen | 68-69=137 | −5 |
| T6 | (Sweden) Carl Pettersson | 67-70=137 | −5 |
| T6 | (Republic of Ireland) Des Smyth | 68-69=137 | −5 |
| T9 | (Trinidad and Tobago) Stephen Ames | 68-70=138 | −4 |
| T9 | (Denmark) Thomas Bjørn | 68-70=138 | −4 |
| T9 | (France) Thomas Levet | 72-66=138 | −4 |
| T9 | (Scotland) Colin Montgomerie | 74-64=138 | −4 |
| T9 | (United States) Mark O'Meara | 69-69=138 | −4 |
| T9 | (England) Ian Poulter | 69-69=138 | −4 |
| T9 | (Zimbabwe) Nick Price | 68-70=138 | −4 |
| T9 | (United States) Tiger Woods | 70-68=138 | −4 |

Amateurs: Young (+5), Kemp (+6), Larrazábal (+10).

=== Third round ===
Saturday, 20 July 2002

| Place | Player | Score | To par |
|---|---|---|---|
| 1 | (South Africa) Ernie Els | 70-66-72=208 | −5 |
| 2 | (Denmark) Søren Hansen | 68-69-73=210 | −3 |
| T3 | (Denmark) Thomas Bjørn | 68-70-73=211 | −2 |
| T3 | (Spain) Sergio García | 71-69-71=211 | −2 |
| T3 | (United States) Justin Leonard | 71-72-68=211 | −2 |
| T3 | (Japan) Shigeki Maruyama | 68-68-75=211 | −2 |
| T3 | (United States) Scott McCarron | 71-68-72=211 | −2 |
| T3 | (England) Justin Rose | 68-75-68=211 | −2 |
| T3 | (Republic of Ireland) Des Smyth | 68-69-74=211 | −2 |
| T10 | (Australia) Steve Elkington | 71-73-68=212 | −1 |
| T10 | (Republic of Ireland) Pádraig Harrington | 69-67-76=212 | −1 |
| T10 | (France) Thomas Levet | 72-66-74=212 | −1 |
| T10 | (Australia) Peter Lonard | 72-72-68=212 | −1 |

=== Final round ===
Sunday, 21 July 2002

| Place | Player | Score | To par | Money (£) |
|---|---|---|---|---|
| T1 | (South Africa) Ernie Els | 70-66-72-70=278 | −6 | Playoff |
| T1 | (France) Thomas Levet | 72-66-74-66=278 | −6 | Playoff |
| T1 | (Australia) Stuart Appleby | 73-70-70-65=278 | −6 | Playoff |
| T1 | (Australia) Steve Elkington | 71-73-68-66=278 | −6 | Playoff |
| T5 | (England) Gary Evans | 72-68-74-65=279 | −5 | 140,000 |
| T5 | (Republic of Ireland) Pádraig Harrington | 69-67-76-67=279 | −5 | 140,000 |
| T5 | (Japan) Shigeki Maruyama | 68-68-75-68=279 | −5 | 140,000 |
| T8 | (Denmark) Thomas Bjørn | 68-70-73-69=280 | −4 | 77,500 |
| T8 | (Spain) Sergio García | 71-69-71-69=280 | −4 | 77,500 |
| T8 | (South Africa) Retief Goosen | 71-68-74-67=280 | −4 | 77,500 |
| T8 | (Denmark) Søren Hansen | 68-69-73-70=280 | −4 | 77,500 |
| T8 | (United States) Scott Hoch | 74-69-71-66=280 | −4 | 77,500 |
| T8 | (Australia) Peter O'Malley | 72-68-75-65=280 | −4 | 77,500 |

==== Scorecard ====
Final round

| Hole | 1 | 2 | 3 | 4 | 5 | 6 | 7 | 8 | 9 | 10 | 11 | 12 | 13 | 14 | 15 | 16 | 17 | 18 |
|---|---|---|---|---|---|---|---|---|---|---|---|---|---|---|---|---|---|---|
| Par | 4 | 4 | 4 | 3 | 5 | 4 | 3 | 4 | 5 | 4 | 4 | 4 | 3 | 4 | 4 | 3 | 5 | 4 |
| (South Africa) Els | −4 | −4 | −5 | −5 | −5 | −5 | −5 | −5 | −6 | −7 | −7 | −8 | −8 | −7 | −7 | −5 | −6 | −6 |
| (France) Levet | −1 | −2 | −3 | −3 | −3 | −3 | −3 | −3 | −4 | −4 | −4 | −4 | −4 | −4 | −4 | −4 | −6 | −6 |
| (Australia) Appleby | E | E | E | +1 | E | E | E | E | −1 | −2 | −2 | −3 | −3 | −3 | −4 | −4 | −5 | −6 |
| (Australia) Elkington | −1 | −1 | −1 | −2 | −2 | −2 | −2 | −3 | −4 | −4 | −5 | −5 | −5 | −5 | −5 | −5 | −6 | −6 |
| (England) Evans | +2 | +1 | E | E | −1 | −2 | −3 | −4 | −4 | −5 | −6 | −6 | −6 | −6 | −6 | −6 | −6 | −5 |
| (Republic of Ireland) Harrington | −1 | −1 | −1 | −1 | −2 | −2 | −3 | −4 | −4 | −4 | −4 | −4 | −4 | −4 | −5 | −5 | −6 | −5 |
| (Japan) Maruyama | −1 | −2 | −3 | −3 | −4 | −5 | −5 | −5 | −6 | −5 | −5 | −4 | −3 | −3 | −3 | −4 | −5 | −5 |

Cumulative tournament scores, relative to par

=== Playoff ===
The four-hole aggregate playoff was contested over holes 1, 16, 17, & 18; Levet and Elkington went off in the first pair and Els and Appleby in the last. After a 50-foot (15 m) birdie putt on the second hole (#16, par 3), Levet led by a stroke, but bogeyed the last to tie Els at even-par. Appleby and Elkington also bogeyed the last hole and were eliminated by a stroke. At the first hole (#18) of sudden death, Levet put his tee shot in a fairway bunker and bogeyed. Els saved par from a greenside bunker with a five-foot (1.6 m) putt to win the title. Through 2025, this is the only four-man playoff in Open Championship history, and no other current major championship has had a four-way playoff.

| Place | Player | Four-hole | | Sudden-death | | Money (£) |
| Place | Player | Score | To par | Score | To par | Money (£) |
|---|---|---|---|---|---|---|
| 1 | (South Africa) Ernie Els | 4-3-5-4=16 | E | 4 | E | 700,000 |
| T2 | (France) Thomas Levet | 4-2-5-5=16 | E | 5 | +1 | 286,667 |
| T2 | (Australia) Stuart Appleby | 4-4-4-5=17 | +1 | | | 286,667 |
| T2 | (Australia) Steve Elkington | 5-3-4-5=17 | +1 | | | 286,667 |

==== Scorecard ====
| Hole | 1 | 16 | 17 | 18 |
|---|---|---|---|---|
| Par | 4 | 3 | 5 | 4 |
| (South Africa) Els | E | E | E | E |
| (France) Levet | E | −1 | −1 | E |
| (Australia) Appleby | E | +1 | E | +1 |
| (Australia) Elkington | +1 | +1 | E | +1 |
Sudden-death
| (South Africa) Els | | | | E |
| (France) Levet | | | | +1 |

Cumulative playoff scores, relative to par
