= 1998 European Tour =

Golf tour season

1998 European Tour season
- Duration: 22 January 1998 – 1 November 1998
- Number of official events: 38 (Note: A further three tournaments were scheduled but were either cancelled or abandoned.)
- Most wins: (England) Lee Westwood (4)
- Order of Merit: (Scotland) Colin Montgomerie
- Golfer of the Year: (England) Lee Westwood
- Sir Henry Cotton Rookie of the Year: (France) Olivier Edmond

The 1998 European Tour, titled as the 1998 PGA European Tour, was the 27th season of the European Tour, the main professional golf tour in Europe since its inaugural season in 1972.

== Changes for 1998 ==
For the first time the schedule included the Masters Tournament, U.S. Open and PGA Championship, although winnings did not count towards the Order of Merit. There were several changes from the previous season with the addition of the Qatar Masters, the return of the Belgian Open and the loss of the Dimension Data Pro-Am.

In March, the Chemapol Trophy Czech Open was cancelled in the wake of severe floods across the country in July 1997; it was later replaced on the schedule by the German Open. In July, the tour announced the cancellation of the Oki Pro-Am.

== Schedule ==
The following table lists official events during the 1998 season.

Date	Tournament	Host country	Purse (£)	Winner (Note: The number in brackets after each winner's name is the number of European Tour events they had won up to and including that tournament. This information is only shown for European Tour members and are inclusive of the three United States-based major championships which were included on the schedule for the first time in 1998, with earlier editions having retrospectively been recognised as official tour wins.)	OWGR points	Other tours (Note: AFR − Southern Africa Tour; ANZ − PGA Tour of Australasia.)	Notes
25 Jan	Johnnie Walker Classic	Thailand	750,000	(United States) Tiger Woods (n/a)	40	ANZ	
1 Feb	Heineken Classic	Australia	A$1,200,000	(Denmark) Thomas Bjørn (2)	34	ANZ	
8 Feb	South African Open	South Africa	450,000	(South Africa) Ernie Els (6)	30	AFR	
15 Feb	Alfred Dunhill South African PGA Championship	South Africa	400,000	(Zimbabwe) Tony Johnstone (5)	36	AFR	
1 Mar	Dubai Desert Classic	UAE	US$1,300,000	(Spain) José María Olazábal (18)	42		
8 Mar	Qatar Masters	Qatar	US$1,000,000	(Scotland) Andrew Coltart (1)	30		New tournament
15 Mar	Moroccan Open	Morocco	350,000	(Australia) Stephen Leaney (1)	20		
22 Mar	Portuguese Open	Portugal	350,000	(England) Peter Mitchell (3)	20		
12 Apr	Masters Tournament	United States	US$3,200,000	(United States) Mark O'Meara (n/a)	100		Major championship (Note: Unofficial money event at the time, but retrospectively counted as an official win.)
19 Apr	Cannes Open	France	300,000	(France) Thomas Levet (1)	20		
26 Apr	Peugeot Open de España	Spain	550,000	(Denmark) Thomas Bjørn (3)	28		
3 May	Italian Open	Italy	500,000	(Sweden) Patrik Sjöland (1)	22		
10 May	Turespaña Masters Open Baleares	Spain	350,000	(Spain) Miguel Ángel Jiménez (3)	20		
17 May	Benson & Hedges International Open	England	750,000	(Northern Ireland) Darren Clarke (3)	36		
25 May	Volvo PGA Championship	England	1,200,000	(Scotland) Colin Montgomerie (15)	64		Flagship event
1 Jun	Deutsche Bank - SAP Open TPC of Europe	Germany	1,100,000	(England) Lee Westwood (3)	42		
7 Jun	National Car Rental English Open	England	650,000	(England) Lee Westwood (4)	34		
~~14 Jun~~	Compaq European Grand Prix	England	–	Abandoned (Note: Tournament abandoned due to persistent bad weather.)	–		
21 Jun	Madeira Island Open	Portugal	300,000	(Sweden) Mats Lanner (3)	20		
21 Jun	U.S. Open	United States	US$3,000,000	(United States) Lee Janzen (n/a)	100		Major championship
28 Jun	Peugeot Open de France	France	500,000	(Scotland) Sam Torrance (21)	22		
5 Jul	Murphy's Irish Open	Ireland	1,000,000	(England) David Carter (1)	38		
11 Jul	Standard Life Loch Lomond	Scotland	850,000	(England) Lee Westwood (5)	42		
19 Jul	The Open Championship	England	1,700,000	(United States) Mark O'Meara (n/a)	100		Major championship
26 Jul	TNT Dutch Open	Netherlands	800,000	(Australia) Stephen Leaney (2)	36		
2 Aug	Volvo Scandinavian Masters	Sweden	800,000	(Sweden) Jesper Parnevik (4)	34		
~~9 Aug~~	Chemapol Trophy Czech Open	Czech Republic	–	Cancelled	–		
9 Aug	German Open	Germany	700,000	(Australia) Stephen Allan (1)	20		
16 Aug	PGA Championship	United States	US$3,000,000	(Fiji) Vijay Singh (8)	100		Major championship
23 Aug	Smurfit European Open	Ireland	1,200,000	(Sweden) Mathias Grönberg (2)	38		
30 Aug	BMW International Open	Germany	850,000	(England) Russell Claydon (1)	32		
6 Sep	Canon European Masters	Switzerland	800,000	(Germany) Sven Strüver (3)	34		
13 Sep	One 2 One British Masters	England	750,000	(Scotland) Colin Montgomerie (16)	34		
20 Sep	Trophée Lancôme	France	800,000	(Spain) Miguel Ángel Jiménez (4)	44		
27 Sep	Linde German Masters	Germany	1,000,000	(Scotland) Colin Montgomerie (17)	40		
4 Oct	Belgacom Open	Belgium	400,000	(England) Lee Westwood (6)	22		
~~25 Oct~~	Oki Pro-Am	Spain	–	Cancelled	–		
1 Nov	Volvo Masters	Spain	1,000,000	(Northern Ireland) Darren Clarke (4)	42		Tour Championship

=== Unofficial events ===
The following events were sanctioned by the European Tour, but did not carry official money, nor were wins official.

Date	Tournament	Host country	Purse (£)	Winner(s)	OWGR points	Notes
11 Oct	Alfred Dunhill Cup	Scotland	1,000,000	Team South Africa	n/a	Team event
18 Oct	Cisco World Match Play Championship	England	650,000	(United States) Mark O'Meara	44	Limited-field event
18 Oct	Open Novotel Perrier	France	350,000	(Sweden) Olle Karlsson and (Sweden) Jarmo Sandelin	n/a	Team event
8 Nov	Subaru Sarazen World Open	United States	US$2,000,000	(United States) Dudley Hart	38	
22 Nov	World Cup of Golf	New Zealand	US$1,300,000	(England) David Carter and (England) Nick Faldo	n/a	Team event
22 Nov	World Cup of Golf Individual Trophy	New Zealand	US$200,000	(United States) Scott Verplank	n/a	

== Order of Merit ==
The Order of Merit was titled as the Volvo Order of Merit and was based on prize money won during the season, calculated in Pound sterling.

Position	Player	Prize money (£)
1	(Scotland) Colin Montgomerie	993,077
2	(Northern Ireland) Darren Clarke	902,867
3	(England) Lee Westwood	814,386
4	(Spain) Miguel Ángel Jiménez	518,819
5	(Sweden) Patrik Sjöland	500,137
6	(Denmark) Thomas Bjørn	470,798
7	(Spain) José María Olazábal	449,132
8	(South Africa) Ernie Els	433,884
9	(Scotland) Andrew Coltart	388,816
10	(Sweden) Mathias Grönberg	358,779

== Awards ==
Award	Winner	Ref.
Golfer of the Year	(England) Lee Westwood	
Sir Henry Cotton Rookie of the Year	(France) Olivier Edmond	

== See also ==
- 1998 Challenge Tour
- 1998 European Seniors Tour
