= Great North Open =

Tournament information
- Location: Hexham, England
- Established: 1996
- Course: Slaley Hall
- Par: 72
- Length: 7,080 yards (6,470 m)
- Tour: European Tour
- Format: Stroke play
- Prize fund: £600,000
- Month played: June
- Final year: 2002

Tournament record score
- Aggregate: 270 Colin Montgomerie (1997)
- To par: −18 as above

Final champion
- (England) Miles Tunnicliff
- Location in England Location in Northumberland

The Great North Open was the final name of a European Tour golf tournament which was played at Slaley Hall, a country house golf resort in Northumberland in North East England, six years out of seven between 1996 and 2002. It was also played as the Slaley Hall Northumberland Challenge and the Compaq European Grand Prix. The winners included one major champion, Retief Goosen, and two winners of the European Tour Order of Merit, Colin Montgomerie and Lee Westwood. The prize fund peaked at €1,311,090 in 2001 before dropping to €935,760 in the tournament's last year, which was below average for a European Tour event at that time.

== Winners ==
Year	Winner	Score	To par	Margin of victory	Runner(s)-up
Great North Open
2002	(England) Miles Tunnicliff	279	−9	4 strokes	(Germany) Sven Strüver
2001	(Scotland) Andrew Coltart	277	−11	1 stroke	(England) Paul Casey (Scotland) Stephen Gallacher
Compaq European Grand Prix
2000	(England) Lee Westwood	276	−12	3 strokes	(Sweden) Freddie Jacobson
1999	(Wales) David Park	274	−14	1 stroke	(England) David Carter (South Africa) Retief Goosen
1998	Abandoned (Note: Tournament abandoned due to persistent bad weather, with most of the field having not completed the second round.)				
1997	(Scotland) Colin Montgomerie	270	−18	5 strokes	(South Africa) Retief Goosen
Slaley Hall Northumberland Challenge
1996	(South Africa) Retief Goosen	277	−11	2 strokes	(Scotland) Ross Drummond
