= Andrew Coltart =

Scottish golfer and television commentator

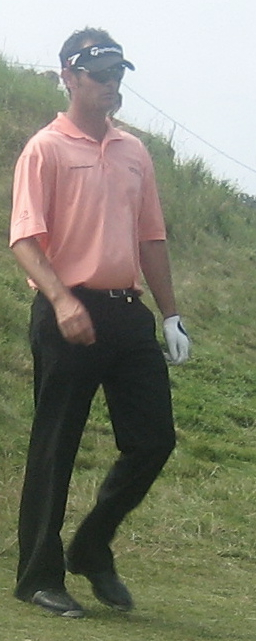

Personal information
- Full name: Andrew John Coltart
- Nationality: Scotland
- Born: 12 May 1970 (age 56) Dumfries, Scotland
- Height: 6 ft 1 in (1.85 m)
- Spouse: Emma Coltart
- Children: 3

Career
- Sport: Golf
- College: Midland College
- Turned professional: 1991
- Former tours: European Tour; PGA Tour of Australasia
- Professional wins: 5
- Highest ranking: 57 (8 November 1998)

Number of wins by tour
- European Tour: 2
- PGA Tour of Australasia: 2
- Other: 1

Best results in major championships
- Masters Tournament: DNP
- PGA Championship: T37: 2001
- U.S. Open: T75: 1997
- The Open Championship: T18: 1999

Achievements and awards
- PGA Tour of Australasia Order of Merit winner: 1997–98

Andrew John Coltart (born 12 May 1970) is a Scottish professional golfer and TV commentator. He had a successful amateur career and played in the 1991 Walker Cup. As a professional he won twice on the European Tour, the 1998 Qatar Masters and the 2001 Great North Open, and played in the 1999 Ryder Cup.

== Early life and amateur career ==
Coltart was born in Dumfries. As an amateur, he won the 1987 Scottish Boys Championship. In 1989 he won the Standard Life Amateur Champion Gold Medal with a 4 under total of 280. He won the 1991 Scottish Amateur Stroke Play Championship and participated in the 1991 Walker Cup.

== Professional career ==
In 1991, Coltart turned professional. He has been a member of the European Tour since 1993. His first professional win came at the Scottish Professional Championship in 1994, which was a non sanctioned event. He has two wins on the main European Tour, the 1998 Qatar Masters and the 2001 Great North Open. In 1995 he was a member of the winning Scottish team in the Alfred Dunhill Cup. He also won the Australian PGA Championship in 1994 and 1997. He won the PGA Tour of Australasia's Order of Merit in 1997/8.

Coltart's best finishes on the European Tour Order of Merit are seventh place in 1996 and ninth place in 1998. He was a member of the European 1999 Ryder Cup team playing in the singles against Tiger Woods.

Since 2011, Coltart has been part of the Sky Sports commentary team, covering golf around the world.

== Personal life ==
His sister Laurae married fellow professional golfer Lee Westwood in January 1999.

== Amateur wins ==
- 1987 Scottish Boys Amateur Championship
- 1991 Scottish Amateur Stroke Play Championship

== Professional wins (5) ==
=== European Tour wins (2) ===
No.	Date	Tournament	Winning score	Margin of victory	Runners-up
1	8 Mar 1998	Qatar Masters	−18 (68-70-65-67=270)	2 strokes	(England) Andrew Sherborne, (Sweden) Patrik Sjöland
2	24 Jun 2001	Great North Open	−11 (68-68-69-72=277)	1 stroke	(England) Paul Casey, (Scotland) Stephen Gallacher

European Tour playoff record (0–1)

No.	Year	Tournament	Opponent	Result
1	1996	Johnnie Walker Classic	(Wales) Ian Woosnam	Lost to birdie on third extra hole

=== PGA Tour of Australasia wins (2) ===
No.	Date	Tournament	Winning score	Margin of victory	Runner(s)-up
1	20 Nov 1994	Reebok Australian PGA Championship	−7 (67-67-77-70=281)	2 strokes	(Australia) Terry Price
2	23 Nov 1997	MasterCard Australian PGA Championship (2)	−3 (72-71-66-76=285)	4 strokes	(Australia) Stephen Allan, (Australia) Stuart Appleby

PGA Tour of Australasia playoff record (0–1)

No.	Year	Tournament	Opponent	Result
1	1996	Johnnie Walker Classic	(Wales) Ian Woosnam	Lost to birdie on third extra hole

=== Other wins (1) ===
No.	Date	Tournament	Winning score	Margin of victory	Runner-up
1	15 May 1994	Scottish Professional Championship	−7 (73-71-69-68=281)	Playoff	(Scotland) Gary Orr

== Results in major championships ==
Tournament	1991	1992	1993	1994	1995	1996	1997	1998	1999
U.S. Open							T75		
The Open Championship	CUT	CUT		T24	T20	CUT	CUT	T44	T18
PGA Championship								69	T65

Tournament	2000	2001	2002	2003	2004	2005	2006	2007	2008	2009	2010
U.S. Open											
The Open Championship	T55	T37	T37								72
PGA Championship	T51	T37									

Note: Coltart never played in the Masters Tournament.

Did not play

CUT = missed the half-way cut
"T" = tied

== Results in World Golf Championships ==
Tournament	1999	2000	2001
Match Play			R16
Championship		T17	NT^{1}
Invitational	T33	T17	

^{1}Cancelled due to 9/11

Top 10
Did not play

QF, R16, R32, R64 = Round in which player lost in match play
"T" = Tied
NT = No tournament

== Team appearances ==
Amateur

- Jacques Léglise Trophy (representing Great Britain & Ireland): 1987 (winners)
- European Boys' Team Championship (representing Scotland): 1987 (winners), 1988
- European Amateur Team Championship (representing Scotland): 1989, 1991
- European Youths' Team Championship (representing Scotland): 1990
- Eisenhower Trophy (representing Great Britain & Ireland): 1990
- St Andrews Trophy (representing Great Britain & Ireland): 1990 (winners)
- Walker Cup (representing Great Britain & Ireland): 1991

Professional

- Alfred Dunhill Cup (representing Scotland): 1994, 1995 (winners), 1996, 1998, 2000
- World Cup (representing Scotland): 1994, 1995, 1996, 1998, 2001
- Ryder Cup (representing Europe): 1999

== See also ==
- 2008 European Tour Qualifying School graduates
- 2009 European Tour Qualifying School graduates
