= Pascal Edmond =

French professional golfer

Personal information
- Full name: Pascal Edmond
- Nationality: France
- Born: 19 November 1971 (age 54) Paris, France
- Height: 1.78 m (5 ft 10 in)
- Weight: 70 kg (150 lb; 11 st)
- Life partner: Alice Roulet Edmond
- Children: 3

Career
- Sport: Golf
- Turned professional: 1991
- Former tour: European Tour
- Professional wins: 2

Number of wins by tour
- Challenge Tour: 1
- Other: 1

Pascal Edmond (born 19 November 1971) is a French professional golfer.

== Early life ==
In 1971, Edmond was born in Paris. His brother Olivier is also a professional golfer.

== Professional career ==
In 1991, Edmond turned professional. Despite many trips to qualifying school, Edmond never managed to gain full playing status on the European Tour. However, he did play many seasons on the second-tier Challenge Tour, and in 2000 won the Aa St Omer Open, finishing with a tournament record lowest final round by a winner, 64, and biggest final round comeback by a winner, five shots. That victory accounts for more than half of his career earnings on the two tours combined.

Edmond later moved to Canada where he is the director of the golf academy at Les Quatre Domaines in Mirabel, Quebec.

== Professional wins (2) ==
=== Challenge Tour wins (1) ===
No.	Date	Tournament	Winning score	Margin of victory	Runner-up
1	11 Jun 2000	Aa St Omer Open	−18 (74-64-72-64=274)	1 stroke	(France) Franck Aumonier

=== Other wins (1) ===
- 1997 Grand Prix PGA France
