= Thomas Levet =

French professional golfer (born 1968)

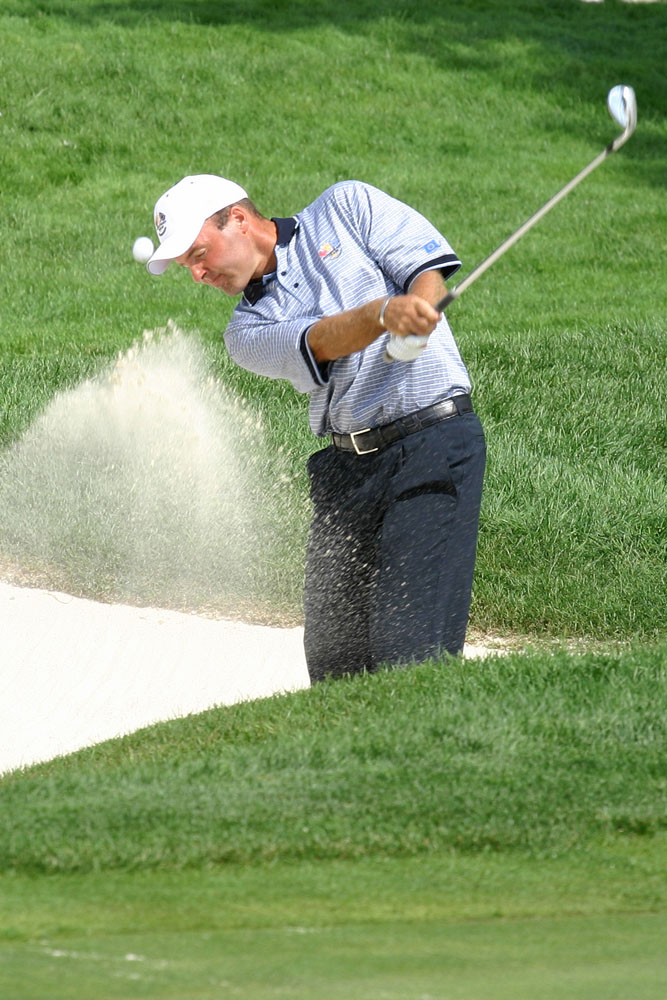

Personal information
- Full name: Thomas Jean Roger Levet
- Nationality: France
- Born: 5 September 1968 (age 58) Paris, France
- Height: 5 ft 9 in (1.75 m)
- Spouse: Caroline (m. 1998)
- Children: 3

Career
- Sport: Golf
- Turned professional: 1988
- Current tour: European Senior Tour
- Former tours: European Tour; PGA Tour
- Professional wins: 15
- Highest ranking: 41 (2 January 2005)

Number of wins by tour
- European Tour: 6
- European Senior Tour: 3
- Other: 6

Best results in major championships
- Masters Tournament: T13: 2005
- PGA Championship: T51: 2009
- U.S. Open: T18: 2002
- The Open Championship: T2: 2002

Thomas Jean Roger Levet (born 5 September 1968) is a French professional golfer who is a member of the European Tour and former member of the PGA Tour.

== Career ==
Levet was born in Paris, France. He turned professional in 1988 and won the French PGA Championship that year. He first qualified for the European Tour for the 1991 season and spent the next six years on the tour, splitting time with the PGA Tour in 1994. He made only three cuts on the European Tour in 1996 and fell to the second-tier Challenge Tour. He regained his European Tour card in April 1998 by winning the Cannes Open, to which he had gained access through the French Golf Federation.

In 2002, he finished second at The Open Championship at Muirfield, being one of four players in a playoff. He had a good chance to win, but bogeyed the final hole of the four-hole playoff to fall into sudden death with Ernie Els, where he again bogeyed to lose to Els.

After spending 2003 on the PGA Tour, he returned to the European Tour in 2004. He claimed the most prestigious title of his career at the Scottish Open, and was a member of the winning 2004 European Ryder Cup Team. Levet ended the season 5th on the Order of Merit, and returned to the PGA Tour in 2005.

Levet has severe vertigo, which almost forced him out of the game, however he has made strides to overcome the condition, and has featured in the top 50 of the Official World Golf Rankings.

In 2008 he won his fourth European Tour title, beating nineteen-year-old Oliver Fisher in a sudden death playoff in the MAPFRE Open de Andalucia.

His fifth win on the European Tour came at the 2009 Open de España where he held off a charging Fabrizio Zanotti, who shot a final round 65, by two strokes finishing 18 under par. With this win Levet became the leading Frenchman in terms of European Tour wins.

Levet won his sixth European Tour title in July 2011 when he triumphed in his native country, at the Alstom Open de France by one stroke from Englishman Mark Foster and Dane Thorbjørn Olesen. He became the 7th French player to win the tournament after Jean-François Remésy. While celebrating his victory, Levet jumped into a lake, breaking his shin, and causing him to withdraw from The Open Championship.

== Professional wins (15) ==
=== European Tour wins (6) ===
| No. | Date | Tournament | Winning score | Margin of victory | Runner(s)-up |
|---|---|---|---|---|---|
| 1 | 19 Apr 1998 | Cannes Open | −6 (69-71-65-73=278) | 1 stroke | (Wales) Phillip Price, (Germany) Sven Strüver, (New Zealand) Greg Turner |
| 2 | 3 Jun 2001 | Victor Chandler British Masters | −14 (69-69-67-69=274) | Playoff | (Sweden) Mathias Grönberg, (England) David Howell, (Sweden) Robert Karlsson |
| 3 | 11 Jul 2004 | Barclays Scottish Open | −15 (70-67-69-63=269) | 1 stroke | (New Zealand) Michael Campbell |
| 4 | 30 Mar 2008 | MAPFRE Open de Andalucía | −16 (69-68-68-67=272) | Playoff | (England) Oliver Fisher |
| 5 | 3 May 2009 | Open de España | −18 (64-67-71-68=270) | 2 strokes | (Paraguay) Fabrizio Zanotti |
| 6 | 3 Jul 2011 | Alstom Open de France | −7 (70-70-67-70=277) | 1 stroke | (England) Mark Foster, (Denmark) Thorbjørn Olesen |

European Tour playoff record (2–2)

| No. | Year | Tournament | Opponent(s) | Result |
|---|---|---|---|---|
| 1 | 2001 | Victor Chandler British Masters | (Sweden) Mathias Grönberg, (England) David Howell, (Sweden) Robert Karlsson | Won with birdie on third extra hole Howell and Karlsson eliminated by par on first hole |
| 2 | 2002 | The Open Championship | (Australia) Stuart Appleby, (Australia) Steve Elkington, (South Africa) Ernie Els | Els won with par on first extra hole after four-hole aggregate playoff; Els: E (4-3-5-4=16), Levet: E (4-2-5-5=16), Appleby: +1 (4-3-5-5=17), Elkington: +1 (5-3-4-5=17) |
| 3 | 2004 | Telecom Italia Open | (Northern Ireland) Graeme McDowell | Lost to par on fourth extra hole |
| 4 | 2008 | MAPFRE Open de Andalucía | (England) Oliver Fisher | Won with par on first extra hole |

=== Other wins (6) ===
- 1988 French PGA Championship
- 1990 National Omnium (France)
- 1991 French PGA Championship
- 1992 Championnat de France Pro
- 1997 Toulouse Open, New Caledonia French Masters

=== European Senior Tour wins (3) ===
| No. | Date | Tournament | Winning score | Margin of victory | Runner-up |
|---|---|---|---|---|---|
| 1 | 6 Oct 2019 | Farmfoods European Senior Masters | −10 (69-69-68=206) | 1 stroke | (Austria) Markus Brier |
| 2 | 4 Sep 2021 | Legends Open de France | −13 (67-65-68=200) | 3 strokes | (Canada) David Morland IV |
| 3 | 12 Sep 2021 | Scottish Senior Open | −9 (70-69-65=204) | Playoff | (Austria) Markus Brier |

European Senior Tour playoff record (1–0)

| No. | Year | Tournament | Opponent | Result |
|---|---|---|---|---|
| 1 | 2021 | Scottish Senior Open | (Austria) Markus Brier | Won with par on first extra hole |

== Playoff record ==
PGA Tour playoff record (0–1)

| No. | Year | Tournament | Opponents | Result |
|---|---|---|---|---|
| 1 | 2002 | The Open Championship | (Australia) Stuart Appleby, (Australia) Steve Elkington, (South Africa) Ernie Els | Els won with par on first extra hole after four-hole aggregate playoff; Els: E (4-3-5-4=16), Levet: E (4-2-5-5=16), Appleby: +1 (4-3-5-5=17), Elkington: +1 (5-3-4-5=17) |

== Results in major championships ==
| Tournament | 1998 | 1999 | 2000 | 2001 | 2002 | 2003 | 2004 | 2005 | 2006 | 2007 | 2008 | 2009 | 2010 | 2011 |
|---|---|---|---|---|---|---|---|---|---|---|---|---|---|---|
| Masters Tournament | | | | | | CUT | | T13 | CUT | | | | | |
| U.S. Open | | | | | T18 | | CUT | T52 | | | CUT | T45 | | CUT |
| The Open Championship | CUT | T49 | | T66 | T2 | T22 | T5 | T34 | | | | T38 | CUT | |
| PGA Championship | | | | | 71 | | CUT | CUT | | | | T51 | | |

Top 10
Did not play

CUT = missed the half-way cut
"T" = tied

=== Summary ===
| Tournament | Wins | 2nd | 3rd | Top-5 | Top-10 | Top-25 | Events | Cuts made |
|---|---|---|---|---|---|---|---|---|
| Masters Tournament | 0 | 0 | 0 | 0 | 0 | 1 | 3 | 1 |
| U.S. Open | 0 | 0 | 0 | 0 | 0 | 1 | 6 | 3 |
| The Open Championship | 0 | 1 | 0 | 2 | 2 | 3 | 9 | 7 |
| PGA Championship | 0 | 0 | 0 | 0 | 0 | 0 | 4 | 2 |
| Totals | 0 | 1 | 0 | 2 | 2 | 5 | 22 | 13 |

- Most consecutive cuts made – 5 (1999 Open Championship – 2002 PGA)
- Longest streak of top-10s – 1 (twice)

== Results in The Players Championship ==
| Tournament | 2003 |
|---|---|
| The Players Championship | CUT |

CUT = missed the halfway cut

== Results in World Golf Championships ==
| Tournament | 2004 | 2005 | 2006 | 2007 | 2008 | 2009 |
|---|---|---|---|---|---|---|
| Match Play | | R64 | | | | |
| Championship | T28 | | | | | |
| Invitational | T32 | T46 | T54 | | | |
| Champions | | | | | | T57 |

Did not play

QF, R16, R32, R64 = Round in which player lost in match play
"T" = Tied
Note that the HSBC Champions did not become a WGC event until 2009.

== Team appearances ==
Amateur

- European Boys' Team Championship (representing France): 1985
- Jacques Léglise Trophy (representing the Continent of Europe): 1985
- European Amateur Team Championship (representing France): 1987
- Eisenhower Trophy (representing France): 1988

Professional

- Alfred Dunhill Cup (representing France): 1992, 1998, 2000
- World Cup (representing France): 1998, 2000, 2001, 2002, 2003, 2004, 2005, 2009
- Seve Trophy (representing Continental Europe): 2002, 2005
- Ryder Cup (representing Europe): 2004 (winners)

== See also ==
- 1993 PGA Tour Qualifying School graduates
