= Olivier Edmond =

French professional golfer

Personal information
- Full name: Olivier Edmond
- Nationality: France
- Born: 29 January 1970 (age 56) Paris, France
- Height: 1.82 m (6 ft 0 in)
- Weight: 84 kg (185 lb; 13.2 st)
- Spouse: Catherine (m. 1996)
- Children: 2

Career
- Sport: Golf
- Turned professional: 1990
- Former tour: European Tour
- Professional wins: 1

Number of wins by tour
- Challenge Tour: 1

Achievements and awards
- Sir Henry Cotton Rookie of the Year: 1998

Olivier Edmond (born 29 January 1970) is a French professional golfer.

== Early life and amateur career ==
In 1970, Edmond was born in Paris. His brother, Pascal, is also a professional golfer.

As an amateur, Edmond represented France in the Eisenhower Trophy. He won the 1990 French Amateur Championship and the Brabazon Trophy (tie with Gary Evans).

== Professional career ==
In 1990, Edmond turned professional. After several seasons on the second-tier Challenge Tour, Edmond won a European Tour card at his fifth attempt at qualifying school in 1997. He carried his good form into his début season, and was named the European Tour's Sir Henry Cotton Rookie of the Year in 1998. In 1999, he was successfully treated for testicular cancer but after a moderately successful return to the tour in 2000, including a joint 7th-place finish at the Volvo PGA Championship, wasn't able to return to his previous form and his European Tour career came to an end after the 2003 season.

Having moved to live in Canada, where he became the head professional at Les Quatre Domaines in Mirabel, Quebec, Edmond took just 26 strokes to complete the back nine at Club de Golf Beloeil on his way to setting the course record of 61. In 2006, he finished tied for 2nd in the Canadian PGA Club Professional Championship.

== Amateur wins ==
- 1990 Brabazon Trophy (tied with Gary Evans), French Native Amateur Championship

== Professional wins (1) ==
=== Challenge Tour wins (1) ===
No.	Date	Tournament	Winning score	Margin of victory	Runner-up
1	26 Sep 1997	BPGT Challenge	−21 (69-67-63-68=267)	2 strokes	(United States) Craig Hainline

== Team appearances ==
Amateur

- European Boys' Team Championship (representing France): 1988 (winners)
- European Amateur Team Championship (representing France): 1989
- European Youths' Team Championship (representing France): 1990
- St Andrews Trophy (representing the Continent of Europe): 1990
- Eisenhower Trophy (representing France): 1990

Professional

- Alfred Dunhill Cup (representing France): 1998
