= Russell Claydon =

English golfer (born 1965)

Personal information
- Nationality: England
- Born: 19 November 1965 (age 60) Cambridge, England
- Height: 1.88 m (6 ft 2 in)

Career
- Sport: Golf
- Turned professional: 1989
- Former tour: European Tour
- Professional wins: 2
- Highest ranking: 90 (2 May 1999)

Number of wins by tour
- European Tour: 1
- Other: 1

Best results in major championships
- Masters Tournament: DNP
- PGA Championship: DNP
- U.S. Open: DNP
- The Open Championship: T11: 1994

Achievements and awards
- Sir Henry Cotton Rookie of the Year: 1990

Russell Claydon (born 19 November 1965) is an English professional golfer.

== Early life and amateur career ==
Claydon was born in Cambridge, England. He won the English Amateur in 1988.

== Professional career ==
In 1989, Claydon turned professional. He played on the European Tour from 1989 to 2004. He was in the top one hundred on the Order of Merit every year from 1990 to 1999, with a best placing of twentieth in 1997. He had six second place tournament finishes on the tour before picking up his first and only win at the 1998 BMW International Open.

Claydon struggled for form in the new Millennium and by 2005 he was playing few tournaments. However, he remained involved with the European Tour as a member of its board of directors. He was also a member of England's three man team in the 1997 Alfred Dunhill Cup.

== Amateur wins ==
- 1988 English Amateur, Berkshire Trophy, Lagonda Trophy
- 1989 St Andrews Links Trophy, Lake Macquarie Amateur

== Professional wins (2) ==
=== European Tour wins (1) ===
No.	Date	Tournament	Winning score	Margin of victory	Runner-up
1	30 Aug 1998	BMW International Open	−18 (66-72-64-68=270)	1 stroke	(England) Jamie Spence

European Tour playoff record (0–1)

No.	Year	Tournament	Opponents	Result
1	1996	Volvo Scandinavian Masters	(England) Paul Broadhurst, (England) Lee Westwood	Westwood won with birdie on second extra hole Broadhurst eliminated by par on first hole

=== PGA EuroPro Tour wins (1) ===
No.	Date	Tournament	Winning score	Margin of victory	Runners-up
1	8 Sep 2006	Peugeot International Open	−13 (65-71-64=200)	3 strokes	(England) Warren Bennett, (Scotland) Euan Little, (England) Simon Robinson, (England) Michael Searle

== Results in major championships ==
Tournament	1989	1990	1991	1992	1993	1994	1995	1996	1997	1998
The Open Championship	T69LA					T11	T55		CUT	CUT

Note: Claydon only played in The Open Championship.

Did not play

LA = Low amateur
CUT = missed the half-way cut
"T" = tied

== Team appearances ==
Amateur

- Walker Cup (representing Great Britain & Ireland): 1989 (winners)
- European Amateur Team Championship (representing England): 1989 (winners)

Professional

- Dunhill Cup (representing England): 1997
