= Gary Evans (golfer) =

English golfer (born 1969)

Personal information
- Nationality: England
- Born: 22 February 1969 (age 57) Rustington, West Sussex, England
- Height: 5 ft 10 in (1.78 m)
- Weight: 168 lb (76 kg; 12.0 st)

Career
- Sport: Golf
- Turned professional: 1991
- Current tour: European Senior Tour
- Former tour: European Tour
- Highest ranking: 87 (30 November 2003)

Best results in major championships
- Masters Tournament: DNP
- PGA Championship: T51: 2003
- U.S. Open: DNP
- The Open Championship: T5: 2002

Gary Evans (born 22 February 1969) is an English professional golfer.

== Early life and amateur career ==
In 1969, Evans was born in Rustington, West Sussex.

As an amateur, he won the Brabazon Trophy in 1990 and 1991 (shared both times). Both those years he also won the Lytham Trophy. In addition, he represented Great Britain & Ireland in the 1991 Walker Cup.

== Professional career ==
In 1991, Evans turned professional. Evans earned membership of the European Tour on his first visit to the qualifying school. He was a consistent performer on the European Tour throughout his career, finishing inside the top 100 on the Order of Merit every season he played from 1992 through 2004 (he missed the 1995 season with a wrist injury), with a best of 21st place in 2002. Back and shoulder problems which eventually required surgery brought a premature end to his 2005 season, and he retired at the end of 2006 having never won a tournament on the European Tour.

The highlight of Evans' career came at the 2002 Open Championship at Muirfield where he was in contention on the final day and finished in a tie for fifth place, just one stroke outside the four man play-off, eventually won by Ernie Els.

Two years later, at the 2004 Open, Evans became only the seventh golfer in the long history of the competition to record an albatross (double eagle), on the fourth hole at Royal Troon.

== Amateur wins ==
- 1986 Carris Trophy
- 1990 Brabazon Trophy (tied with Olivier Edmond), Lytham Trophy
- 1991 Brabazon Trophy (tied with Mark Pullan), Lytham Trophy

== Results in major championships ==
Tournament	1989	1990	1991	1992	1993	1994	1995	1996	1997	1998	1999
The Open Championship	CUT		CUT	CUT	CUT	T35				73	
PGA Championship											

Tournament	2000	2001	2002	2003	2004
The Open Championship			T5	T10	T20
PGA Championship				T51	

Note: Evans only played in The Open Championship and the PGA Championship.

Top 10
Did not play

CUT = missed the half-way cut
"T" indicates a tie for a place

== Results in World Golf Championships ==
Tournament	2002
Match Play	
Championship	T15
Invitational	

Did not play

"T" = Tied

== Team appearances ==
Amateur

- Sussex Schools and English Schools: 1985
- Sussex Boys, Youths, Seniors: 1985–1991
- England Boys, Youths, Seniors: 1985–1991
- Eisenhower Trophy (representing Great Britain & Ireland): 1990
- European Amateur Team Championship (representing England): 1991 (winners), 1993
- Walker Cup (representing Great Britain & Ireland): 1991
