= 1990 Eisenhower Trophy =

Coordinates: 43.504°S 172.666°E

Tournament information
- Dates: 25–28 October
- Location: Christchurch, New Zealand
- Course: Christchurch Golf Club
- Format: 72 holes stroke play

Statistics
- Par: 72
- Length: 7,002 yards (6,403 m)
- Field: 33 teams 131 players

Champion
- Sweden; Klas Eriksson, Mathias Grönberg, Gabriel Hjertstedt & Per Nyman
- 879 (+15)

The 1990 Eisenhower Trophy took place 25 to 28 October at the Christchurch Golf Club near Christchurch, New Zealand. It was the 17th World Amateur Team Championship for the Eisenhower Trophy. The tournament was a 72-hole stroke play team event with 33 four-man teams. The best three scores for each round counted towards the team total.

Sweden won the Eisenhower Trophy for the first time, finishing 13 strokes ahead of the joint silver medalists, New Zealand and United States with Canada, France and Japan tied for fourth place. Mathias Grönberg had the lowest individual score, 2-under-par 286, six strokes better than fellow-Swede Gabriel Hjertstedt.

== Teams ==
33 teams contested the event. Each team had four players with the exception of team Brazil who only had three.

Country	Players
Argentina	Fernando Chiesa, Ronaldo Damm, Martin Lonardi, Diego Ventureira
Australia	Robert Allenby, Chris Gray, Lester Peterson, John Wade
Austria	Marcus Brier, Alexander Peterskovsky, Fritz Poppmeier, Rudi Sailer
Belgium	Christophe Bosmans, Emanuel Janssens, Amaury D'Ogimont, Dany Vanbegin
Bermuda	Scott Mayne, David Purcell, Jack Wahl, Robert Vallis
Brazil	Patrick Caussin, Rafael Gonzalez, Wagner Rocumback
Canada	Jeff Cannon, Craig Marseilles, Doug Roxburgh, Warren Sye
Chinese Taipei	Chang Tse-peng, Huang Tze-lang, Tsai Chi-huang, Yeh Wei-tze
Denmark	Jan Andersen, Jacob Greisen, Bjørn Norgaard, Henrik Simonsen
Fiji	Mahmood Buksh, Dharam Rrakash, Jalen Raman, Indra Warjan
Finland	Anssi Kankonen, Petri Pulkinen, Juha Selin, Erkki Välimaa
France	Christian Cévaër, Olivier Edmond, François Illouz, Christophe Pottier
Germany	Rainer Mund, Hans-Günter Raiter, Jan Schapmann, Ekkehart Schieffer,
Great Britain & Ireland	Andrew Coltart, Gary Evans, Jim Milligan, Ricky Willison
Guatemala	Gerardo Berger, Oscar Castillo, Francisco Escobar, Rolando Vasquez
Hong Kong	Derek Fung, Ian Hindhaygh, Scott Rowe, David Tonroe
Italy	Massimo Florioli, Enrico Nistri, Marcello Santi, Massimo Scarpa
Ivory Coast	Bertin Djedji, Alain Danho, Siaka Kone, Marcel Suoumahoro
Japan	Noriaki Kimura, Yasunobu Kuramoto, Shigeki Maruyama, Kiyotaka Oie
Malaysia	John Eu, P. Gunasagaran, Wong Hung Nung, Saad Yusuf
Mexico	Roberto Lebrija, Alejandro Munoz, Federico Ortiz, Miguel Quijano
Netherlands	Stephane Lovey, Rolf Muntz, Rik Ruts, Michael Vogel
New Zealand	Steven Alker, Michael Long, Grant Moorhead, Brent Paterson
Norway	Knut Ekjord, Bjørn Hage, Thomas Nielsen, Øyvind Rojahn
Philippines	Danilo Cabajar, Felix Cassius Casas, Francis Gaston, Vince Lauron
Puerto Rico	Elvin Cordova, Elvin Gonzalez, Luis Juncos, Andres Subira
Singapore	Dino Kwek, Kevin Lee, Douglas Oui, John Pang
South Korea	Joo Hwan Ahn, Ik Je Chang, Jin Kun Oh, Hye Sik Min
Spain	Diego Borrego, Eduardo de la Riva, Snr, Tomás Jesus Muñoz, Alfonso Vidaer
Sweden	Klas Eriksson, Mathias Grönberg, Gabriel Hjertstedt, Per Nyman
Switzerland	Kouroche Achtari, Chritophe Bovet, Markus Frank, Thomas Gottstein
United States	Allen Doyle, David Duval, David Eger, Phil Mickelson
Zimbabwe	Michael Dardagan, Ross Dennett, Anderson Rusike, Craig Singleton

== Scores ==
Place	Country	Score	To par
1st place, gold medalist(s)	Sweden	215-212-229-223=879	+15
2nd place, silver medalist(s)	New Zealand	222-222-230-218=892	+28
2nd place, silver medalist(s)	United States	227-222-223-220=892	+28
T4	Canada	224-222-227-230=903	+39
T4	France	228-221-231-223=903	+39
T4	Japan	228-224-232-219=903	+39
7	Italy	227-231-230-218=906	+42
8	Australia	224-228-232-224=908	+44
9	Great Britain & Ireland	228-226-226-230=910	+46
10	Spain	234-228-230-219=911	+47
11	Argentina	222-219-233-241=915	+51
12	Netherlands	228-224-240-228=920	+56
T13	Denmark	240-231-232-221=924	+60
T13	Germany	241-219-237-227=924	+60
T13	Norway	231-221-240-232=924	+60
16	Finland	236-224-234-231=925	+61
17	South Korea	222-233-239-233=927	+63
18	Switzerland	227-236-239-226=928	+64
19	Mexico	236-232-237-231=936	+72
T20	Malaysia	234-232-241-232=939	+75
T20	Philippines	231-235-234-239=939	+75
22	Austria	237-242-231-230=940	+76
23	Belgium	238-232-240-233=943	+79
24	Hong Kong	235-233-243-233=944	+80
25	Chinese Taipei	238-239-245-235=957	+93
26	Singapore	241-243-239-235=958	+94
27	Bermuda	242-247-236-235=960	+96
28	Ivory Coast	240-239-244-239=962	+98
29	Brazil	245-236-239-246=966	+102
30	Zimbabwe	239-248-241-241=969	+105
31	Fiji	246-251-259-243=999	+135
32	Puerto Rico	253-256-274-248=1031	+167
33	Guatemala	263-263-260-269=1055	+191

== Individual leaders ==
There was no official recognition for the lowest individual scores.

Place	Player	Country	Score	To par
1	Mathias Grönberg	Sweden	70-67-77-72=286	−2
2	Gabriel Hjertstedt	Sweden	73-71-74-74=292	+4
T3	Michael Long	New Zealand	71-71-79-73=294	+6
T3	Shigeki Maruyama	Japan	72-75-75-72=294	+6
5	Olivier Edmond	France	75-72-74-75=296	+8
T6	Roberto Lebrija	Mexico	72-73-78-75=298	+10
T6	Massimo Scarpa	Italy	76-76-76-70=298	+10
T8	David Duval	United States	77-69-77-76=299	+11
T8	Massimo Florioli	Italy	74-78-76-71=299	+11
T8	Phil Mickelson	United States	78-78-72-71=299	+11
