= Open de Divonne =

Former Challenge Tour golf tournament

Open Divonne
Tournament information
- Location: Divonne-les-Bains, France
- Established: 1993
- Course: Golf de Divonne Les Bains
- Par: 72
- Tour: Challenge Tour
- Format: Stroke play
- Prize fund: £50,000
- Month played: July
- Final year: 1995

Final champion
- (Sweden) Patrik Sjöland

Location map
- Location in France Location in Auvergne-Rhône-Alpes

The Open de Divonne was a golf tournament on the Challenge Tour, held from 1993 to 1995 at Divonne-les-Bains in France, near Geneva and the border with Switzerland.

== Winners ==
Year	Winner	Score	To par	Margin of victory	Runner-up	Ref.
Open Divonne
1995	(Sweden) Patrik Sjöland	269	−19	5 strokes	(France) Nicolas Kalouguine	
1994	(England) Stuart Cage	272	−16	2 strokes	(Wales) Stephen Dodd	
Open de Divonne
1993	(Sweden) Fredrik Larsson	275	−13	2 strokes	(England) Liam White	
