= 1998 World Cup of Golf =

Tournament information
- Dates: 19–22 November
- Location: Auckland, New Zealand
- Course: Gulf Harbor Country Club
- Format: 72 holes stroke play combined score

Statistics
- Par: 72
- Length: 6,850 yards (6,260 m)
- Field: 32 two-man teams
- Cut: None
- Prize fund: US$1,300,000 team US$200,000 individual
- Winner's share: US$400,000 team US$100,000 individual

Champion
- England; David Carter & Nick Faldo
- 568 (−8)

The 1998 World Cup of Golf took place 19–22 November at the Gulf Harbor Country Club in Auckland, New Zealand. It was the 44th World Cup. The tournament was a 72-hole stroke play team event (32 teams) with each team consisting of two players from a country. The combined score of each team determined the team results. Individuals also competed for the International Trophy. The prize money totaled $1,500,000 with $400,000 going to the winning pair and $100,000 to the top individual. The English team of David Carter and Nick Faldo won by two strokes over the Italian team of Massimo Florioli and Costantino Rocca. American Scott Verplank took the International Trophy by one stroke over Faldo and Rocca.

== Teams ==
Country	Players
Argentina	Ángel Cabrera and Ricardo González
Australia	Richard Green and Peter O'Malley
Austria	Karl Ableidinger and Claude Grenier
Brazil	Ruberlei Felizardo and Acacio Jorge
Canada	Rick Gibson and Ian Leggatt
Chile	Guillermo Encina and Roy Mackenzie
Colombia	Gustavo Mendoza and Rigoberto Velásquez
Denmark	Søren Hansen and Søren Kjeldsen
England	David Carter and Nick Faldo
France	Thomas Levet and Jean van de Velde
Germany	Thomas Gögele and Sven Strüver
Ireland	Pádraig Harrington and Paul McGinley
Italy	Massimo Florioli and Costantino Rocca
Jamaica	Delroy Cambridge and Seymour Rose
Japan	Yasuharu Imano and Mitsutaka Kusakabe
Luxembourg	John Penning and John Pickford
Malaysia	Periasamy Gunasegaran and Ali Kadir
Mexico	Cesar Perez and Esteban Toledo
Netherlands	Hayo Bensdorp and Ruben Wechgelaer
New Zealand	Frank Nobilo and Greg Turner
Norway	Per Haugsrud and Øyvind Rojahn
Paraguay	Ramon Franco and Pedro Martínez
Scotland	Andrew Coltart and Colin Montgomerie
South Africa	David Frost and Nic Henning
South Korea	Kwang Soo Choi and Young Suk Kwon
Spain	Santiago Luna and Miguel Ángel Martín
Sweden	Mathias Grönberg and Patrik Sjöland
Switzerland	Christophe Bovet and Paolo Quirici
United States	John Daly and Scott Verplank
Venezuela	Damaso Galban and Miguel Martinez
Wales	Phillip Price and Ian Woosnam
Zimbabwe	Tony Johnstone and Mark McNulty

== Scores ==
Team

Place	Country	Score	To par	Money (US$) (per team)
1	England	141-141-149-137=568	−8	400,000
2	Italy	139-151-142-138=570	−6	200,000
T3	Argentina	142-145-143-141=571	−5	101,667
T3	Scotland	142-143-152-134=571	−5	101,667
T3	United States	140-149-151-131=571	−5	101,667
6	Ireland	139-148-145-140=572	−4	60,000
T7	New Zealand	145-147-143-138=573	−3	38,500
T7	Zimbabwe	139-151-146-137=573	−3	38,500
9	Australia	138-146-151-139=574	−2	28,000
10	Spain	147-144-151-137=579	+3	24,000
T11	Japan	134-155-155-136=580	+4	18,500
T11	Sweden	138-157-151-134=580	+4	18,500
T13	Canada	140-146-153-142=581	+5	14,000
T13	Colombia	142-153-147-139=581	+5	14,000
15	France	141-151-147-144=583	+7	11,000
T16	Chile	140-151-153-145=589	+13	9,500
T16	South Africa	137-147-155-150=589	+13	9,500
18	Wales	142-153-153-142=590	+14	8,800
19	Germany	142-153-154-143=592	+16	8,600
T20	Paraguay	146-149-152-146=593	+17	8,300
T20	Switzerland	148-153-144-148=593	+17	8,300
22	Denmark	149-152-153-145=599	+23	8,000
T23	Norway	146-156-151-149=602	+26	7,700
T23	South Korea	151-146-153-152=602	+26	7,700
25	Mexico	152-150-157-144=603	+27	7,400
26	Malaysia	142-153-157-152=604	+28	7,200
27	Austria	146-153-161-147=607	+31	7,000
28	Brazil	148-158-160-147=613	+37	6,800
29	Venezuela	152-154-159-149=614	+38	6,600
30	Jamaica	152-163-160-151=626	+50	6,400
31	Netherlands	163-161-165-154=643	+67	6,200
32	Luxembourg	159-163-170-155=647	+71	6,000

International Trophy

Place	Player	Country	Score	To par	Money (US$)
1	Scott Verplank	United States	70-72-74-63=279	−9	100,000
T2	Nick Faldo	England	68-70-73-69=280	−8	37,500
T2	Costantino Rocca	Italy	65-74-71-70=280	−8	37,500
4	Yasuharu Imano	Japan	64-75-75-67=281	−7	15,000
T5	Patrik Sjöland	Sweden	68-77-74-63=282	−6	5,000
T5	Greg Turner	New Zealand	73-71-70-68=282	−6	5,000
7	Peter O'Malley	Australia	69-73-74-67=283	−5	
T8	Ángel Cabrera	Argentina	69-71-71-73=284	−4	
T8	Ian Leggatt	Canada	69-70-76-69=284	−4	
T8	Colin Montgomerie	Scotland	72-69-75-68=284	−4	
