= David Carter (golfer) =

English golfer (born 1972)

Personal information
- Full name: David Malcolm Carter
- Nationality: England
- Born: 16 June 1972 (age 54) Johannesburg, South Africa
- Height: 6 ft 1 in (1.85 m)

Career
- Sport: Golf
- Turned professional: 1989
- Former tour: European Tour
- Professional wins: 3
- Highest ranking: 87 (27 June 1999)

Number of wins by tour
- European Tour: 1
- Other: 2

Best results in major championships
- Masters Tournament: DNP
- PGA Championship: DNP
- U.S. Open: DNP
- The Open Championship: T44: 1998

David Malcolm Carter (born 16 June 1972) is an English golfer.

== Early life ==
Carter was born in Johannesburg, South Africa, and represented his country of birth at junior level. He later moved to England.

== Professional career ==
In 1989, Carter turned professional. After several visits to qualifying school he had his rookie season on the European Tour in 1995. His best season was 1998, when he won the Murphy's Irish Open, which remains his only official money victory on the tour, and finished 19th on the Order of Merit. However he is probably best known for winning that year's World Cup for England in partnership with Nick Faldo. He also won the 1996 Indian PGA Championship.

Carter moved to the Czech Republic in 2008. In April 2010, he opened his first golf academy at the Albatross Golf Course – David Carter Albatross Golf Academy.

== Personal life ==
In March 1997, Carter almost lost his life when he required emergency brain surgery after collapsing in his hotel in Dubai.

== Professional wins (3) ==
=== European Tour wins (1) ===
No.	Date	Tournament	Winning score	Margin of victory	Runner-up
1	5 Jul 1998	Murphy's Irish Open	−6 (68-72-67-71=278)	Playoff	(Scotland) Colin Montgomerie

European Tour playoff record (1–0)

No.	Year	Tournament	Opponent	Result
1	1998	Murphy's Irish Open	(Scotland) Colin Montgomerie	Won with par on first extra hole

=== Other wins (2) ===
- 1996 Indian PGA Championship
- 1998 World Cup of Golf (with Nick Faldo)

== Results in major championships ==
Tournament	1998	1999
The Open Championship	T44	CUT

Note: Carter only played in The Open Championship.
CUT = missed the half-way cut
"T" = tied

== Team appearances ==
Professional

- Alfred Dunhill Cup (representing England): 1998
- World Cup (representing England): 1998 (winners)
