= 1998 Alfred Dunhill Cup =

Coordinates: 56.351484°N 2.816147°W

Tournament information
- Dates: 8–11 October
- Location: St Andrews, Scotland
- Course(s): Old Course at St Andrews
- Format: Match play

Statistics
- Par: 72
- Length: 7,094 yards (6,487 m)
- Field: 16 teams of 3 players
- Prize fund: £1,000,000
- Winner's share: £300,000

Champion
- South Africa (Ernie Els, David Frost, Retief Goosen)

The 1998 Alfred Dunhill Cup was the 14th Alfred Dunhill Cup. It was a team tournament featuring 16 countries, each represented by three players. The Cup was played 8–11 October at the Old Course at St Andrews in Scotland. The sponsor was the Alfred Dunhill company. The South African team of Ernie Els, David Frost, and Retief Goosen beat the Spanish team of Miguel Ángel Jiménez, Santiago Luna, and José María Olazábal in the final. It was the second win for South Africa, with the same team having won in 1997.

== Format ==
The Cup was a match play event played over four days. The teams were divided into four four-team groups. After three rounds of round-robin play, the top team in each group advanced to a single elimination playoff.

In each team match, the three players were paired with their opponents and played 18 holes at medal match play. Matches tied at the end of 18 holes were extended to a sudden-death playoff. The tie-breaker for ties within a group was based on match record, then head-to-head.

== Group play ==
=== Round one ===
Group 1

Sweden – 3		Japan – 0	
Player	Score	Player	Score
Patrik Sjöland	69	Hiroyuki Fujita	77
Mathias Grönberg	78	Nobuo Serizawa	79
Per-Ulrik Johansson	71	Katsumasa Miyamoto	76

United States – 3		England – 0	
Player	Score	Player	Score
John Daly	70	Lee Westwood	73
Tiger Woods	66	David Carter	74
Mark O'Meara	67	Peter Baker	74

Group 2

Scotland – 2		China – 1	
Player	Score	Player	Score
Gary Orr	75	Wu Xiang-bing	76
Andrew Coltart	73	Cheng Jun	78
Colin Montgomerie	73	Zhang Lian-wei	72

Ireland – 1		Spain – 2	
Player	Score	Player	Score
Darren Clarke	71	Santiago Luna	71
Paul McGinley	72	Miguel Ángel Jiménez	70
Pádraig Harrington	75	José María Olazábal	73

Clarke won on the fourth playoff hole.

Group 3

Zimbabwe – 3		Germany – 0	
Player	Score	Player	Score
Tony Johnstone	69	Sven Strüver	76
Nick Price	72	Thomas Gögele	73
Mark McNulty	73	Alex Čejka	75

South Africa – 3		France – 0	
Player	Score	Player	Score
Retief Goosen	72	Olivier Edmond	73
David Frost	70	Thomas Levet	75
Ernie Els	69	Jean van de Velde	72

Group 4

Australia – 3		Argentina – 0	
Player	Score	Player	Score
Stuart Appleby	66	José Cóceres	77
Craig Parry	70	Ángel Cabrera	75
Steve Elkington	70	Eduardo Romero	70

Elkington won on the first playoff hole.

New Zealand – 1		South Korea – 2	
Player	Score	Player	Score
Michael Long	76	Shin Yong-jin	75
Frank Nobilo	75	Kang Wook-soon	71
Greg Turner	70	Kim Jong-duck	73

=== Round two ===
Group 1

United States – 3		Japan – 0	
Player	Score	Player	Score
John Daly	77	Nobuo Serizawa	80
Tiger Woods	70	Katsumasa Miyamoto	77
Mark O'Meara	70	Hiroyuki Fujita	75

Sweden – 3		England – 0	
Player	Score	Player	Score
Mathias Grönberg	72	Lee Westwood	72
Per-Ulrik Johansson	70	David Carter	73
Patrik Sjöland	70	Peter Baker	73

Grönberg won on the first playoff hole.

Group 2

Scotland – 2		Ireland – 1	
Player	Score	Player	Score
Andrew Coltart	75	Darren Clarke	73
Gary Orr	77	Pádraig Harrington	78
Colin Montgomerie	72	Paul McGinley	78

Spain – 2		China – 1	
Player	Score	Player	Score
José María Olazábal	78	Wu Xiang-bing	77
Miguel Ángel Jiménez	76	Zhang Lian-wei	83
Santiago Luna	80	Cheng Jun	81

Group 3

Zimbabwe – 1		France – 2	
Player	Score	Player	Score
Mark McNulty	81	Jean van de Velde	71
Tony Johnstone	79	Thomas Levet	77
Nick Price	70	Olivier Edmond	78

South Africa – 1		Germany – 2	
Player	Score	Player	Score
David Frost	78	Thomas Gögele	78
Retief Goosen	76	Alex Čejka	77
Ernie Els	76	Sven Strüver	76

Gögele won on the second playoff hole.
Strüver won on the second playoff hole.

Group 4

Australia – 3		South Korea – 0	
Player	Score	Player	Score
Craig Parry	75	Shin Yong-jin	75
Stuart Appleby	73	Kang Wook-soon	77
Steve Elkington	72	Kim Jong-duck	77

Shin won on the first playoff hole.

New Zealand – 2		Argentina – 1	
Player	Score	Player	Score
Greg Turner	75	Eduardo Romero	DQ
Frank Nobilo	71	Ángel Cabrera	77
Michael Long	81	José Cóceres	75

=== Round three ===
Group 1

United States – 2.5		Sweden – 0.5	
Player	Score	Player	Score
John Daly	71	Per-Ulrik Johansson	72
Mark O'Meara	68	Patrik Sjöland	68
Tiger Woods	66	Mathias Grönberg	73

England – 3		Japan – 0	
Player	Score	Player	Score
Lee Westwood	70	Katsumasa Miyamoto	71
Peter Baker	71	Hiroyuki Fujita	73
David Carter	69	Nobuo Serizawa	75

Group 2

Ireland – 3		China – 0	
Player	Score	Player	Score
Darren Clarke	71	Zhang Lian-wei	73
Paul McGinley	74	Cheng Jun	78
Pádraig Harrington	71	Wu Xiang-bing	74

Scotland – 1		Spain – 2	
Player	Score	Player	Score
Gary Orr	71	José María Olazábal	68
Colin Montgomerie	70	Miguel Ángel Jiménez	70
Andrew Coltart	73	Santiago Luna	74

Jiménez won on the first playoff hole.

Group 3

South Africa – 2		Zimbabwe – 1	
Player	Score	Player	Score
Ernie Els	71	Tony Johnstone	77
David Frost	71	Nick Price	69
Retief Goosen	71	Mark McNulty	76

Germany – 2		France – 1	
Player	Score	Player	Score
Thomas Gögele	69	Thomas Levet	72
Alex Čejka	75	Jean van de Velde	72
Sven Strüver	68	Olivier Edmond	70

Group 4

Argentina – 2		South Korea – 1	
Player	Score	Player	Score
Eduardo Romero	72	Shin Yong-jin	72
Ángel Cabrera	72	Kim Jong-duck	73
José Cóceres	71	Kang Wook-soon	72

Shin won on the first playoff hole.

Australia – 1		New Zealand – 2	
Player	Score	Player	Score
Craig Parry	70	Michael Long	71
Stuart Appleby	73	Greg Turner	72
Steve Elkington	74	Frank Nobilo	72

=== Standings ===
Group 1
Country	W	L	MW	ML
United States	3	0	8.5	0.5
Sweden	2	1	6.5	2.5
England	1	2	3	6
Japan	0	3	0	9

Group 2
Country	W	L	MW	ML
Spain	3	0	6	3
Scotland	2	1	5	4
Ireland	1	2	5	4
China	0	3	2	7

Group 3
Country	W	L	MW	ML
South Africa	2	1	6	3
Germany	2	1	4	5
Zimbabwe	1	2	5	4
France	1	2	3	6

Group 4
Country	W	L	MW	ML
Australia	2	1	7	2
New Zealand	2	1	5	4
Argentina	1	2	3	6
South Korea	1	2	3	6

== Playoffs ==
=== Bracket ===
Semi-finals
United States	1
Spain	2
Australia	1
South Africa	2

Final
Spain	0
South Africa	3

=== Semi-finals ===
United States – 1		Spain – 2	
Player	Score	Player	Score
John Daly	73	Miguel Ángel Jiménez	75
Tiger Woods	72	Santiago Luna	71
Mark O'Meara	76	José María Olazábal	72

South Africa – 2		Australia – 1	
Player	Score	Player	Score
David Frost	72	Craig Parry	78
Retief Goosen	71	Stuart Appleby	74
Ernie Els	73	Steve Elkington	72

=== Final ===
South Africa – 3		Spain – 0	
Player	Score	Player	Score
Retief Goosen	72	Santiago Luna	73
David Frost	76	Miguel Ángel Jiménez	78
Ernie Els	75	José María Olazábal	77

== Team results ==
Country	Place	W	L	MW	ML
South Africa	1	4	1	11	4
Spain	2	4	1	8	7
United States	T3	3	1	9.5	2.5
Australia	T3	2	2	8	4
Sweden	T5	2	1	6.5	2.5
New Zealand	T5	2	1	5	4
Scotland	T5	2	1	5	4
Germany	T5	2	1	4	5
Ireland	T9	1	2	5	4
Zimbabwe	T9	1	2	5	4
Argentina	T9	1	2	3	6
England	T9	1	2	3	6
France	T9	1	2	3	6
South Korea	T9	1	2	3	6
China	T15	0	3	2	7
Japan	T15	0	3	0	9

== Player results ==
Country	Player	W	L
South Africa	Retief Goosen	5	0
South Africa	Ernie Els	3	2
South Africa	David Frost	3	2
Spain	José María Olazábal	3	2
Spain	Miguel Ángel Jiménez	3	2
Spain	Santiago Luna	2	3
United States	John Daly	4	0
United States	Tiger Woods	3	1
United States	Mark O'Meara	2.5	1.5
Australia	Steve Elkington	3	1
Australia	Craig Parry	3	1
Australia	Stuart Appleby	2	2
Sweden	Patrik Sjöland	2.5	0.5
Sweden	Mathias Grönberg	2	1
Sweden	Per-Ulrik Johansson	2	1
New Zealand	Greg Turner	3	0
New Zealand	Frank Nobilo	2	1
New Zealand	Michael Long	0	3
Scotland	Andrew Coltart	2	1
Scotland	Gary Orr	2	1
Scotland	Colin Montgomerie	1	2
Germany	Thomas Gögele	2	1
Germany	Sven Strüver	2	1
Germany	Alex Čejka	0	3
Ireland	Darren Clarke	3	0
Ireland	Pádraig Harrington	1	2
Ireland	Paul McGinley	1	2
Zimbabwe	Nick Price	3	0
Zimbabwe	Tony Johnstone	1	2
Zimbabwe	Mark McNulty	1	2
Argentina	José Cóceres	2	1
Argentina	Ángel Cabrera	1	2
Argentina	Eduardo Romero	0	3
England	Peter Baker	1	2
England	David Carter	1	2
England	Lee Westwood	1	2
France	Jean van de Velde	2	1
France	Thomas Levet	1	2
France	Olivier Edmond	0	3
South Korea	Shin Yong-jin	2	1
South Korea	Kang Wook-soon	1	2
South Korea	Kim Jong-duck	0	3
China	Wu Xiang-bing	1	2
China	Zhang Lian-wei	1	2
China	Cheng Jun	0	3
Japan	Hiroyuki Fujita	0	3
Japan	Katsumasa Miyamoto	0	3
Japan	Nobuo Serizawa	0	3
