= Lee Westwood =

English golfer (born 1973)

Lee Westwood OBE
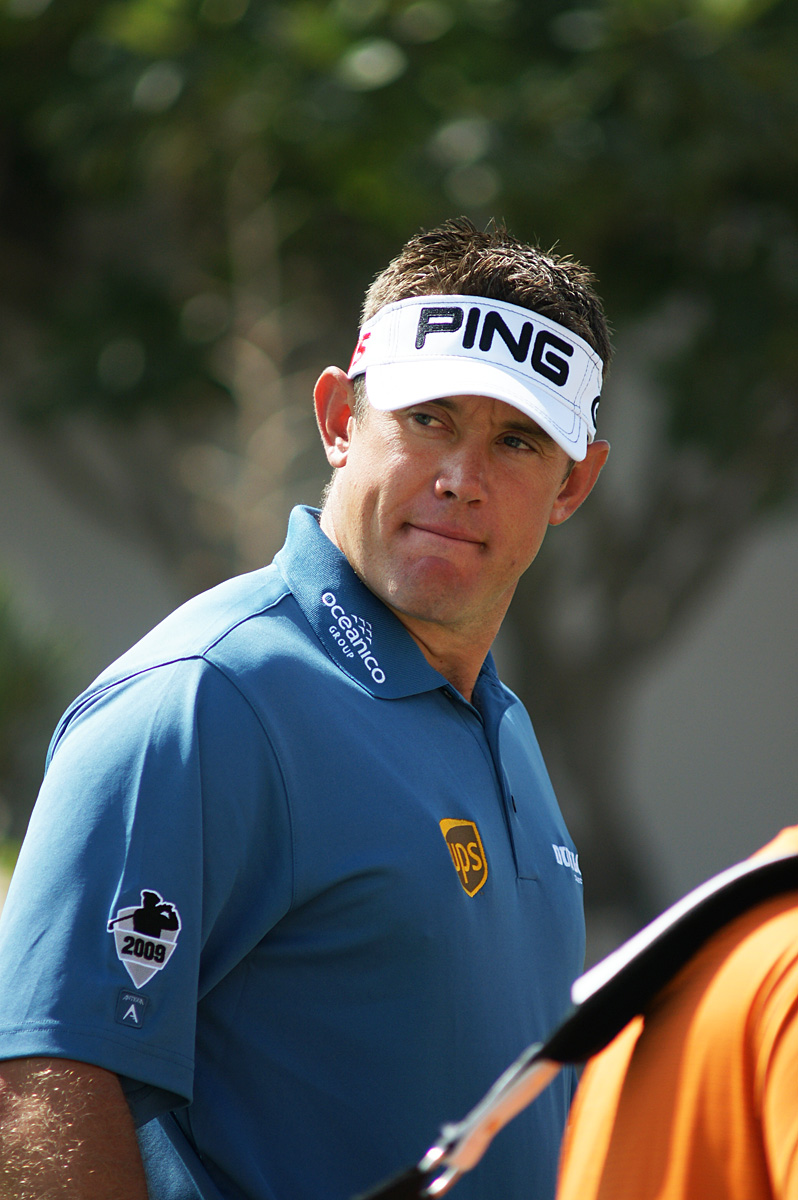

Personal information
- Full name: Lee John Westwood
- Nickname: Westy
- Nationality: England
- Born: 24 April 1973 (age 53) Worksop, Nottinghamshire, England
- Height: 6 ft 0 in (183 cm)
- Weight: 205 lb (93 kg; 14.6 st)
- Spouses: Laurae Coltart (m. 1999; div. 2015) Helen Storey (m. 2021)
- Children: 2

Career
- Sport: Golf
- Turned professional: 1993
- Current tour: LIV Golf
- Former tours: PGA Tour; European Tour
- Professional wins: 44
- Highest ranking: 1 (31 October 2010) (22 weeks)

Number of wins by tour
- PGA Tour: 2
- European Tour: 25 (8th all-time)
- Japan Golf Tour: 4
- Asian Tour: 8 (Tied-6th all-time)
- Sunshine Tour: 3
- PGA Tour of Australasia: 1
- Other: 3

Best results in major championships
- Masters Tournament: 2nd/T2: 2010, 2016
- PGA Championship: T3: 2009
- U.S. Open: 3rd/T3: 2008, 2011
- The Open Championship: 2nd: 2010

Achievements and awards
- European Tour Golfer of the Year: 1998, 2000, 2009, 2020
- European Tour Order of Merit winner/ Race to Dubai winner: 2000, 2009, 2020
- European Tour Players' Player of the Year: 2009, 2020

Lee John Westwood (born 24 April 1973) is an English professional golfer. He is one of the few golfers who has won tournaments on five continents – Europe, North America, Asia, Africa and Oceania – including victories on the European Tour and the PGA Tour. He has also won tournaments in four decades, the 1990s, 2000s, 2010s and 2020s. He was named European Tour Golfer of the Year for the 1998, 2000, 2009 and 2020 seasons. He has won the 2000 European Tour Order of Merit, and the renamed 2009 and 2020 Race to Dubai. He has frequently been mentioned as one of the best golfers without a major championship victory, and he holds the record of playing in the most majors without winning one.

Westwood has represented Europe in eleven Ryder Cups. In October 2010, he became the world number one in the Official World Golf Ranking, ending the reign of Tiger Woods, and becoming the first British golfer since Nick Faldo in 1994 to hold that position. He held the number one position for a total of 22 weeks and is the first to reach the number one ranking without winning a major. He is sometimes referred to by his nickname Westy.

== Early life and amateur career ==
Born in Worksop, Nottinghamshire, Westwood attended Sir Edmund Hillary Primary School and Valley Comprehensive School (now an Outwood Grange Academies Trust school) in his youth. He has family and heritage in South Wales. Westwood began to play golf aged 13 with a half set bought by grandparents. His father John, a mathematics teacher, took up the game at the same time to encourage his son. A talented sportsman at school, Lee played rugby, cricket and football.

Westwood had a later start at the game than many future tournament professionals, but less than two years later he was the junior champion of Nottinghamshire. He played for England in the Boys Home Internationals in August 1989, and played for Great Britain and Ireland boys team in the Jacques Léglise Trophy in both 1990 and 1991. In 1991 he won his first important amateur tournament, the Peter McEvoy Trophy. In 1993 he won the British Youths Open Amateur Championship.

== Professional career ==
=== European Tour ===
In 1993, Westwood turned professional. Three years later, Westwood won his first professional tournament, the 1996 Volvo Scandinavian Masters, closely followed by the Sumitomo Visa Taiheiyo Masters in Japan. His success continued in 1997, defending his Japanese title and winning the Malaysian Open, the Volvo Masters in Spain, and the Holden Australian Open, beating Greg Norman in a playoff. He also partnered with Nick Faldo in the Ryder Cup that year.

Westwood has won 25 events on the European Tour and has also won tournaments in North America, Africa, Asia and Australia. His most successful year to date has been 2000 when he won seven tournaments worldwide and was ranked first on the European Order of Merit, ending Colin Montgomerie's long run of European Tour dominance. His win on the Sunshine Tour's Dimension Data Pro-am in 2000 made him the first golfer to win events on all 6 of the International Federation of PGA Tours. Ernie Els (2005) and Justin Rose (2017) are the only golfers to have joined him on this list. Westwood took a significant break from the game following the birth of son Samuel Bevan in 2001, and together with a restructuring of his swing under David Leadbetter, led to him being out of contention in tournaments until his 2003 victory in Germany, his 25th worldwide.

Westwood returned to the winners circle in 2007 by winning both the Valle Romano Open de Andalucía and the Quinn Direct British Masters to bring his total European Tour wins to 18. As a result, he moved back into the top 50 of the Official World Golf Ranking. Westwood finished the 2007 season with five top 10 finishes in the last five events. He carried this form into the 2008 season, starting with two tied second places and a fifth, moving back into the top 20 in the world rankings. At the Masters, Westwood finished tied for 11th and he narrowly missed out on becoming the first European in 38 years to win the U.S. Open, finishing 3rd on level-par.

In 2009, Westwood had two further 3rd-place finishes at major championships, in the Open and the PGA Championship. In October 2009, Westwood ended his two-year wait for a tournament win by winning the Portugal Masters. This was followed the next month with a win at the Dubai World Championship, which also brought with it the inaugural Race to Dubai title.

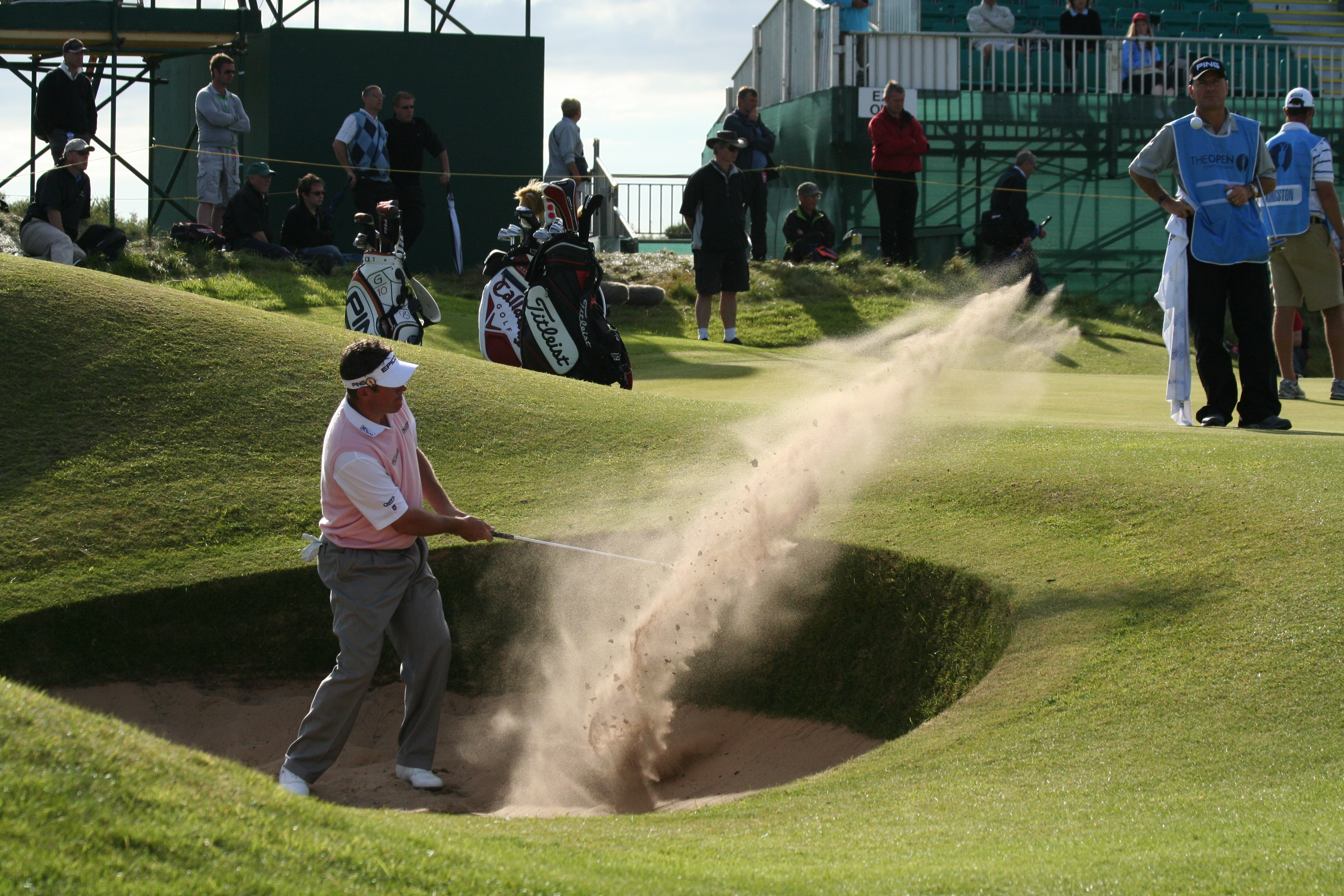
Westwood playing a bunker shot at the 2008 Open Championship

Westwood has played in the Gary Player Invitational charity event several times to assist Player raise money for children in need around the world.

Westwood earned a career-best second place at the 2010 Masters Tournament, leading by one shot going into the final day before being overtaken by eventual champion Phil Mickelson. Westwood came through with his 2nd tour victory at the St. Jude Classic the week before the U.S. Open. Westwood claimed another second-place finish at the 2010 Open Championship, although he was a distant runner-up to Louis Oosthuizen. Despite the two 2nd-place finishes at the season's first three majors, Westwood did not compete in the PGA Championship due to injury.

In May 2011, Westwood contested a playoff at the BMW PGA Championship with fellow Englishman and at the time world number two Luke Donald. On the par five 18th, Donald hit his approach shot into the green leaving six feet for birdie. Westwood attempted to follow him in close to the hole but got too much backspin on his pitch and the ball spun back into the water hazard. Westwood eventually chipped up from the drop zone and went on to make double bogey. Donald then holed his birdie putt to win the championship and in the process became the new world number one.

In June 2011, Westwood equalled his best performance at the U.S. Open finishing in a tie for third place at Congressional CC, an event which was dominated by Rory McIlroy. This was the fourth time in his career that Westwood had finished third in a major. In December 2011, Westwood shot the lowest round of his career, a 60, at the Thailand Golf Championship. He followed that up with a 64 to equal the lowest 36-hole total on the Asian Tour and won the tournament by seven shots.

=== PGA Tour ===
Westwood rejoined the PGA Tour for the 2012 season, stating that "It felt right in a Ryder Cup year" and intimated that he would like to experience the challenge for the FedEx Cup in the end of season playoffs for the first time. In February 2012, Westwood recorded his best ever performance at the WGC-Accenture Match Play Championship when he reached the semi-finals for the first time. In all eleven previous attempts he had never once made it past the second round. He beat Nicolas Colsaerts, Robert Karlsson, Nick Watney and Martin Laird en route before falling, 3&1, to Rory McIlroy in the semi-finals. He finished in 4th place after losing the consolation match to American Mark Wilson, 1 up. Had he won the tournament, he would have regained the number one ranking.

Westwood continued his fine run of performances in the major championships with a tied third finish at the Masters in April 2012. He finished two strokes behind Bubba Watson and Louis Oosthuizen and bemoaned his putting performance as the reason he did not win the tournament. This was the seventh occasion that he had recorded a top three finish at a major without actually winning one. In April 2012, he successfully defended his title at the Indonesian Masters on the Asian Tour, winning by two strokes. In June 2012, Westwood won the Nordea Masters for the third time, the week prior to the U.S. Open, with a five stroke victory over Ross Fisher. This was Westwood's 22nd victory on the European Tour and moved him into ninth place alone on the all time European Tour winners list.

At the 2012 U.S. Open, Westwood was in contention again after firing a three-under-par round of 67 in the third round to position himself three strokes behind the leaders. During the final round, Westwood lost his ball in a tree on the par-four fifth hole after his drive clattered into the pines. The ball was declared lost and he had to play his third shot from the tee, resulting in a double-bogey six which effectively ended his challenge. He finished in a tie for 10th.

In the 2013 Open Championship, Westwood led after 54 holes by two strokes over Hunter Mahan and Tiger Woods. They were the only three players in the field under par for the tournament. Westwood shot a four-over-par 75 in his final round to finish in a tie for third, four strokes back at one-over-par. Phil Mickelson went on to win the tournament with a total of three-under-par, the only player to complete the tournament under par. This was the second time Westwood had taken the lead into the final round of a major championship, with the other being in the 2010 Masters, which Mickelson also won. Westwood has now finished in the top-three eight times in majors without ever winning one.

In April 2015, Westwood won the CIMB Niaga Indonesian Masters for the third time in his career. He won in a sudden-death playoff over Chapchai Nirat, having held a five-stroke lead at the 54-hole stage. This was Westwood's ninth victory in Asian Tour events.

=== Return to Europe ===
In 2016, Westwood did not renew PGA Tour membership. At the 2016 Masters, Westwood finished joint runner-up with Jordan Spieth, three strokes behind winner Danny Willett. He was briefly only one stroke off the lead during the final round following an eagle on the par five 15th, but bogeyed the 16th to end his chances. This was the third time Westwood has finished as runner-up in a major championship. At the 2016 U.S. Open, Westwood was again near the top of the leaderboard after the first three rounds, but playing in the penultimate group during the final round he fell away badly shooting a round 80 (+10) to finish T32.

Westwood holds the record for most major championship appearances without winning, surpassing Jay Haas at the 2021 Open Championship, his 88th major.

In an interview with CNN in November 2017, Westwood spoke of his desire to go into the golf course design industry once he had finished playing, saying he would vow to make courses "more playable and enjoyable".

On 11 November 2018, Westwood fired an eight-under 64 to storm to a three-shot victory in the Nedbank Golf Challenge. Westwood's win in Sun City, South Africa claimed his 24th European Tour victory and his first since the 2014 Malaysian Open. The victory was worth $1,250,000. The Nedbank was his first Rolex Series title and third victory at Gary Player Country Club following wins in 2010 and 2011 before the tournament joined the European Tour international schedule. He also won the Dimension Data Pro-Am in 2000 also played at the Gary Player Country Club.

In July 2019, Westwood finished tied for fourth in the 2019 Open Championship at Royal Portrush Golf Club in Northern Ireland. He has now finished 12 times in the top five of a major without actually winning. This was his best finish at the Open since 2013 and it earned him entry into the 2020 Masters Tournament. "It's brilliant," said Westwood. "Augusta is a very special place. I've played great there in the past and had a chance to win it. It is another course like Royal Portrush Golf Club that I don't strictly think is a bomber's paradise, although I think it helps. If you've played it a lot and you play it well, there are a lot of repeat winners. It will be lovely to go back."

In January 2020, Westwood won the Abu Dhabi HSBC Championship on the European Tour. This tournament was part of the Rolex Series. This win meant he had won titles in four different decades on the European Tour. Westwood finished on 19 under par, two shots ahead of Tommy Fleetwood, Matt Fitzpatrick and Victor Perez. The 46-year-old shot a five-under-par 67 at the Abu Dhabi Golf Club to win the event for the first time. In December of that year, Westwood claimed his third Race to Dubai by finishing solo second in the season-ending DP World Tour Championship, Dubai. At 47 years of age, he became the oldest winner of the title.

In March 2021, Westwood held the 54-hole lead at the Arnold Palmer Invitational. He eventually missed out by one shot to Bryson DeChambeau. This was his best result on the PGA Tour since his tied for second place at the 2016 Masters. The following week, Westwood again held the 54-hole lead at a PGA Tour event; The Players Championship. He shot an even-par 72 and finished second by one shot to eventual champion Justin Thomas. He won more than $1.6 million for this finish, the largest official cheque of his career to date.

=== LIV Golf ===
In June 2022, Westwood was suspended from the PGA Tour for playing in a LIV Golf event. In May 2023, the European Tour announced that he had resigned his membership of the tour.

In April 2023, Westwood turned 50 and became age eligible for senior golf. He applied for entry to the 2023 Senior Open Championship, to be played in late July and for which he had fulfilled several exemption categories. However, in June he was denied entry due to outstanding fines to the European Tour, related to breaching conflicting tournament regulations.

== World ranking ==
Westwood first reached the top 10 in the Official World Golf Ranking in July 1998 and spent a total of 160 weeks in the top 10 between then and August 2001.

Westwood dropped out of top 100 in mid-2002. Returning to the top 100 in late 2003, Westwood's ranking remained in the 20 to 80 range from 2004 and 2007. Early in 2008 he returned to the top 20 where he has remained since. He returned to the top 10 briefly at the end of the 2008 season and again after the 2009 PGA Championship.

On 31 October 2010, Westwood became the World number one golfer, ending the reign of Tiger Woods. He remained World number one for 17 weeks, before being replaced by Martin Kaymer who held the top spot for 8 weeks. Westwood regained the number one spot after winning the Indonesian Masters on 24 April 2011 and held it for 5 weeks before being replaced by Luke Donald. He spent over 350 weeks in the top-10.

== Ryder Cup ==
Westwood made his Ryder Cup debut in 1997 where he partnered fellow Englishman Nick Faldo in both sets of fourballs and foursomes. In the 1999 Ryder Cup, he partnered Darren Clarke for the fourballs and foursomes, picking up 2 points. At The Belfry in 2002 he teamed up with Sergio García in a successful partnership in which they won 3 and lost 1 of their four matches.

In the 2004 Ryder Cup, Westwood sank the putt which took Europe's points tally to 14 and thereby ensured that they retained the Cup. Europe eventually won 18½–9½. It was his first victory in singles. He and Darren Clarke were the wildcard selections in 2006 and Westwood justified his selection by not losing a game, a feat he had also achieved in 2004. He is the eighth most successful European golfer on points scored, with the second highest scoring rate.

During the 2008 Matches, Westwood sat out for the first session in his Ryder Cup career during the matches after a controversial decision by captain Nick Faldo. The European Team ended up losing to the U.S. 16½–11½. In October 2010, Westwood was a member of the European team that won the 2010 Ryder Cup with a one-point win over the USA.

For the 2012 and 2014 tournaments, Westwood was once again a member of winning teams, with Europe beating USA at Medinah Country Club and Gleneagles. In 2016, his friend Darren Clarke was captain and he was once again chosen as a wildcard, this time part of a losing team for the first time since 2008.

In 2018, Thomas Bjørn selected Westwood as one of his five vice-captains for the 2018 Ryder Cup at Le Golf National, alongside Graeme McDowell, Luke Donald, Pádraig Harrington and Robert Karlsson.

In September 2021, Westwood played on the European team in the 2021 Ryder Cup at Whistling Straits in Kohler, Wisconsin. The U.S. team won 19–9 and Westwood went 1–2–0 including a win in his Sunday singles match against Harris English.

He is the European player who has the greatest number of appearances in Ryder Cup winning teams (7 wins, 4 losses).

- Singles: played 11, won 4, lost 7, halved 0
- Foursomes: played 20, won 9, lost 7, halved 4
- Fourballs: played 16, won 8, lost 6, halved 2

== Personal life ==
Westwood married Laurae Coltart, the sister of Scottish Ryder Cup player Andrew Coltart, in January 1999. The couple have two children. Westwood and Coltart divorced in 2017, after which Westwood moved back to Europe from his residence in Palm Beach Gardens, Florida. Westwood now lives in Jesmond, Newcastle upon Tyne with his wife, Helen Storey, who also caddies for him on tour. The pair married in Las Vegas in June 2021.

He is good friends with fellow Ryder Cup star Darren Clarke and from April 2006 he co-owned a private jet with him.

In 2007, Westwood was presented with an Honorary degree of Doctor of Science by Nottingham Trent University. The university named its sports hall after the golfer in October 2010. He announced the creation of the Lee Westwood Golf School in 2010, which offers young golfers the ability to combine golf training with their education as part of their school life. In addition, since 2010 Westwood has created a Junior Lee Westwood Golf Tour and Lee Westwood Golf Camps. In recognition of his work with young golfers, he was awarded with the Golf Foundation's 'Spirit of Golf' Award just before the Open Championship, an award which was previously held by Gary Player and Tony Jacklin.

Westwood's major passion is horse racing, in which he has had an interest in several successful horses, including Hoof It which won the Stewards Cup twice. Other interests include films, snooker and cars. He is a keen football fan who supports Nottingham Forest. He also supports and sponsors his local semi professional side Worksop Town FC. Westwood is a follower of Dumfries based football club Queen of the South, most likely due to having Andrew Coltart as a former brother-in-law, who himself is a passionate supporter of the Scottish club.

== Awards and honors ==
- Westwood has won European Tour Golfer of the Year four times: in 1998, 2000, 2009, and 2020
- In 2011, Westwood was appointed Officer of the Order of the British Empire (OBE) in the 2011 Birthday Honours.

== Amateur wins ==
- 1991 Peter McEvoy Trophy
- 1992 Lagonda Trophy
- 1993 British Youths Open Amateur Championship, Leven Gold Medal

== Professional wins (44) ==
=== PGA Tour wins (2) ===
No.	Date	Tournament	Winning score	Margin of victory	Runner(s)-up
1	6 Apr 1998	Freeport-McDermott Classic	−15 (69-68-67-69=273)	3 strokes	(United States) Steve Flesch
2	13 Jun 2010	St. Jude Classic	−10 (63-68-71-68=270)	Playoff	(United States) Robert Garrigus, (Sweden) Robert Karlsson

PGA Tour playoff record (1–0)

No.	Year	Tournament	Opponents	Result
1	2010	St. Jude Classic	(United States) Robert Garrigus, (Sweden) Robert Karlsson	Won with birdie on fourth extra hole Garrigus eliminated by par on first hole

=== European Tour wins (25) ===
Legend
Tour Championships (2)
Rolex Series (2)
Other European Tour (21)

No.	Date	Tournament	Winning score	Margin of victory	Runner(s)-up
1	4 Aug 1996	Volvo Scandinavian Masters	−7 (69-75-69-68=281)	Playoff	(England) Paul Broadhurst, (England) Russell Claydon
2	2 Nov 1997	Volvo Masters	−16 (65-67-68=200) (Note: Shortened to 54 holes due to weather.)	3 strokes	(Republic of Ireland) Pádraig Harrington
3	1 Jun 1998	Deutsche Bank - SAP Open TPC of Europe	−23 (69-69-61-66=265)	1 stroke	(Northern Ireland) Darren Clarke
4	7 Jun 1998	National Car Rental English Open	−17 (68-68-67-68=271)	2 strokes	(Australia) Greg Chalmers, (Sweden) Olle Karlsson
5	11 Jul 1998	Standard Life Loch Lomond	−8 (69-69-68-70=276)	4 strokes	(Australia) Robert Allenby, (Sweden) Dennis Edlund, (England) David Howell, (Scotland) Gary Orr, (Argentina) Eduardo Romero, (Wales) Ian Woosnam
6	4 Oct 1998	Belgacom Open	−16 (67-68-67-66=268)	Playoff	(Sweden) Freddie Jacobson
7	25 Jul 1999	TNT Dutch Open	−15 (72-68-66-63=269)	1 stroke	(Scotland) Gary Orr
8	2 Aug 1999	Smurfit European Open	−17 (69-67-70-65=271)	3 strokes	(Northern Ireland) Darren Clarke, (Australia) Peter O'Malley
9	5 Sep 1999	Canon European Masters	−14 (69-69-67-65=270)	2 strokes	(Denmark) Thomas Bjørn
10	21 May 2000	Deutsche Bank - SAP Open TPC of Europe (2)	−15 (71-69-69-64=273)	3 strokes	(Italy) Emanuele Canonica
11	25 Jun 2000	Compaq European Grand Prix	−12 (68-68-70-70=276)	3 strokes	(Sweden) Freddie Jacobson
12	9 Jul 2000	Smurfit European Open (2)	−12 (71-68-71-66=276)	1 stroke	(Argentina) Ángel Cabrera
13	6 Aug 2000	Volvo Scandinavian Masters (2)	−14 (63-67-69-71=270)	3 strokes	(New Zealand) Michael Campbell
14	24 Sep 2000	Belgacom Open (2)	−18 (65-69-67-65=266)	4 strokes	(Argentina) Eduardo Romero
15	31 Aug 2003	BMW International Open	−19 (65-68-70-66=269)	3 strokes	(Germany) Alex Čejka
16	28 Sep 2003	Dunhill Links Championship	−21 (70-68-62-67=267)	1 stroke	(South Africa) Ernie Els
17	13 May 2007	Valle Romano Open de Andalucía	−20 (72-64-65-67=268)	2 strokes	(Sweden) Fredrik Andersson Hed, (England) Phillip Archer
18	23 Sep 2007	Quinn Direct British Masters	−15 (68-70-70-65=273)	5 strokes	(England) Ian Poulter
19	18 Oct 2009	Portugal Masters	−23 (66-67-66-66=265)	2 strokes	(Italy) Francesco Molinari
20	22 Nov 2009	Dubai World Championship	−23 (66-69-66-64=265)	6 strokes	(England) Ross McGowan
21	1 May 2011	Ballantine's Championship^{1,2}	−12 (72-68-69-67=276)	1 stroke	(Spain) Miguel Ángel Jiménez
22	9 Jun 2012	Nordea Masters (3)	−19 (68-64-68-69=269)	5 strokes	(England) Ross Fisher
23	20 Apr 2014	Maybank Malaysian Open^{1}	−18 (65-66-71-68=270)	7 strokes	(Belgium) Nicolas Colsaerts, (South Africa) Louis Oosthuizen, (Austria) Bernd Wiesberger
24	11 Nov 2018	Nedbank Golf Challenge	−15 (71-69-69-64=273)	3 strokes	(Spain) Sergio García
25	19 Jan 2020	Abu Dhabi HSBC Championship	−19 (69-68-65-67=269)	2 strokes	(England) Matt Fitzpatrick, (England) Tommy Fleetwood, (France) Victor Perez

^{1}Co-sanctioned by the Asian Tour
^{2}Co-sanctioned by the Korean Tour

European Tour playoff record (2–6)

No.	Year	Tournament	Opponent(s)	Result
1	1996	Volvo Scandinavian Masters	(England) Paul Broadhurst, (England) Russell Claydon	Won with birdie on second extra hole Broadhurst eliminated by par on first hole
2	1998	Belgacom Open	(Sweden) Freddie Jacobson	Won with birdie on first extra hole
3	2007	HSBC Champions	(England) Ross Fisher, (United States) Phil Mickelson	Mickelson won with birdie on second extra hole
4	2008	Quinn Insurance British Masters	(Spain) Gonzalo Fernández-Castaño	Lost to par on third extra hole
5	2009	Open de France Alstom	(Germany) Martin Kaymer	Lost to par on first extra hole
6	2010	Omega Dubai Desert Classic	(Spain) Miguel Ángel Jiménez	Lost to par on third extra hole
7	2011	BMW PGA Championship	(England) Luke Donald	Lost to birdie on first extra hole
8	2018	Made in Denmark	(England) Steven Brown, (England) Jonathan Thomson, (England) Matt Wallace	Wallace won with birdie on second extra hole Thomson and Westwood eliminated by birdie on first hole

=== PGA of Japan Tour wins (4) ===
No.	Date	Tournament	Winning score	Margin of victory	Runner(s)-up
1	10 Nov 1996	Sumitomo Visa Taiheiyo Masters	−10 (68-70-68=206)	Playoff	(Italy) Costantino Rocca, (United States) Jeff Sluman
2	16 Nov 1997	Sumitomo Visa Taiheiyo Masters (2)	−16 (68-68-65-71=272)	1 stroke	(Japan) Masashi Ozaki, (Japan) Naomichi Ozaki
3	15 Nov 1998	Sumitomo Visa Taiheiyo Masters (3)	−13 (72-67-67-69=275)	2 strokes	(Japan) Masashi Ozaki
4	22 Nov 1998	Dunlop Phoenix Tournament	−13 (68-67-66-70=271)	3 strokes	(Northern Ireland) Darren Clarke

PGA of Japan Tour playoff record (1–0)

No.	Year	Tournament	Opponents	Result
1	1996	Sumitomo Visa Taiheiyo Masters	(Italy) Costantino Rocca, (United States) Jeff Sluman	Won with par on fourth extra hole Sluman eliminated by birdie on first hole

=== Asian Tour wins (8) ===
Legend
Flagship events (2)
Other Asian Tour (6)

No.	Date	Tournament	Winning score	Margin of victory	Runner(s)-up
1	18 Apr 1999	Macau Open	−9 (66-69-70-70=275)	Playoff	(United States) Andrew Pitts
2	24 Apr 2011	Indonesian Masters	−19 (68-66-66-69=269)	3 strokes	(Thailand) Thongchai Jaidee
3	1 May 2011	Ballantine's Championship^{1,2}	−12 (72-68-69-67=276)	1 stroke	(Spain) Miguel Ángel Jiménez
4	18 Dec 2011	Thailand Golf Championship	−22 (60-64-73-69=266)	7 strokes	(South Africa) Charl Schwartzel
5	22 Apr 2012	CIMB Niaga Indonesian Masters (2)	−16 (65-68-65-74=272)	2 strokes	(Thailand) Thaworn Wiratchant
6	20 Apr 2014	Maybank Malaysian Open^{1}	−18 (65-66-71-68=270)	7 strokes	(Belgium) Nicolas Colsaerts, (South Africa) Louis Oosthuizen, (Austria) Bernd Wiesberger
7	14 Dec 2014	Thailand Golf Championship (2)	−8 (70-71-72-67=280)	1 stroke	(Australia) Marcus Fraser, (Germany) Martin Kaymer
8	26 Apr 2015	CIMB Niaga Indonesian Masters (3)	−7 (69-74-65-73=281)	Playoff	(Thailand) Chapchai Nirat

^{1}Co-sanctioned by the European Tour
^{2}Co-sanctioned by the Korean Tour

Asian Tour playoff record (2–0)

No.	Year	Tournament	Opponent	Result
1	1999	Macau Open	(United States) Andrew Pitts	Won with par on second extra hole
2	2015	CIMB Niaga Indonesian Masters	(Thailand) Chapchai Nirat	Won with birdie on first extra hole

=== Asia Golf Circuit wins (1) ===
No.	Date	Tournament	Winning score	Margin of victory	Runner-up
1	9 Mar 1997	Benson & Hedges Malaysian Open	−14 (64-72-69-69=274)	2 strokes	(United States) Larry Barber

Asia Golf Circuit playoff record (0–1)

No.	Year	Tournament	Opponent	Result
1	1998	Benson & Hedges Malaysian Open	(England) Ed Fryatt	Lost to par on second extra hole

=== Sunshine Tour wins (3) ===
No.	Date	Tournament	Winning score	Margin of victory	Runner-up
1	6 Feb 2000	Dimension Data Pro-Am	−14 (68-67-69-70=274)	5 strokes	(United States) Tom Gillis
2	9 Dec 2010	Nedbank Golf Challenge	−17 (68-64-71-68=271)	8 strokes	(South Africa) Tim Clark
3	7 Dec 2011	Nedbank Golf Challenge (2)	−15 (68-70-62-73=273)	2 strokes	(Sweden) Robert Karlsson

=== PGA Tour of Australasia wins (1) ===
Legend
Flagship events (1)
Other PGA Tour of Australasia (0)

No.	Date	Tournament	Winning score	Margin of victory	Runner-up
1	30 Nov 1997	Holden Australian Open	−14 (68-66-68-72=274)	Playoff	(Australia) Greg Norman

PGA Tour of Australasia playoff record (1–0)

No.	Year	Tournament	Opponent	Result
1	1997	Holden Australian Open	(Australia) Greg Norman	Won with par on fourth extra hole

=== Other wins (2) ===
No.	Date	Tournament	Winning score	Margin of victory	Runner(s)-up
1	9 Oct 2000	Cisco World Match Play Championship	38 holes		(Scotland) Colin Montgomerie
2	16 Nov 2003	Nelson Mandela Invitational (with (South Africa) Simon Hobday)	−15 (65-64=129)	2 strokes	(South Africa) Hugh Baiocchi and (South Africa) Tim Clark

Other playoff record (0–1)

No.	Year	Tournament	Opponent	Result
1	2000	Nedbank Golf Challenge	(South Africa) Ernie Els	Lost to birdie on second extra hole

== Results in major championships ==
Results not in chronological order in 2020.

Tournament	1995	1996	1997	1998	1999
Masters Tournament			T24	44	T6
U.S. Open			T19	T7	CUT
The Open Championship	T96	CUT	T10	T64	T18
PGA Championship			T29	CUT	T16

Tournament	2000	2001	2002	2003	2004	2005	2006	2007	2008	2009
Masters Tournament	CUT		44			CUT	CUT	T30	T11	43
U.S. Open	T5	CUT			T36	T33		T36	3	T23
The Open Championship	T64	T47	CUT	CUT	4	CUT	T31	T35	T67	T3
PGA Championship	T15	T44	CUT	CUT	CUT	T17	T29	T32	CUT	T3

Tournament	2010	2011	2012	2013	2014	2015	2016	2017	2018
Masters Tournament	2	T11	T3	T8	7	T46	T2	T18	
U.S. Open	T16	T3	T10	T15	CUT	T50	T32	T55	
The Open Championship	2	CUT	T45	T3	CUT	T49	T22	T27	T61
PGA Championship		T8	CUT	T33	T15	T43	85	T67	

Tournament	2019	2020	2021	2022	2023	2024	2025
Masters Tournament		T38	CUT	T14			
PGA Championship	CUT		T71	CUT			
U.S. Open		T13	T46				
The Open Championship	T4	NT	T59	T34			T34

Top 10
Did not play

CUT = missed the half way cut
"T" indicates a tie for a place
NT = no tournament due to COVID-19 pandemic

=== Summary ===
Tournament	Wins	2nd	3rd	Top-5	Top-10	Top-25	Events	Cuts made
Masters Tournament	0	2	1	3	6	11	21	17
PGA Championship	0	0	1	1	2	6	23	15
U.S. Open	0	0	2	3	5	10	20	17
The Open Championship	0	1	2	5	6	8	28	22
Totals	0	3	6	12	19	35	92	71

- Most consecutive cuts made – 14 (2014 PGA – 2018 Open)
- Longest streak of top-10s – 3 (twice)

== Results in The Players Championship ==
Tournament	1998	1999
The Players Championship	T5	T6

Tournament	2000	2001	2002	2003	2004	2005	2006	2007	2008	2009
The Players Championship	T48	CUT	CUT			T22	T38		CUT	

Tournament	2010	2011	2012	2013	2014	2015	2016	2017	2018	2019
The Players Championship	T4		T61	T8	T6	CUT		T65		

Tournament	2020	2021	2022
The Players Championship	C	2	CUT

Top 10
Did not play

CUT = missed the halfway cut
"T" indicates a tie for a place
C = Cancelled after the first round due to the COVID-19 pandemic

== Results in World Golf Championships ==
Results not in chronological order before 2015.

Tournament	1999	2000	2001	2002	2003	2004	2005	2006	2007	2008	2009	2010	2011	2012	2013	2014	2015	2016	2017	2018	2019
Championship	T4	2	NT^{1}		T35	T13	T51	T32		T34	T61	T30	T18	T29	T25	T34	T12		T28		T33
Match Play	R64	R32		R32		R64	R32	R64	R64	R32	R32	R32	R32	4	R64	R64	R16	T38	T17		T56
Invitational	T33	T20	WD	T15	T46	T9	T24	WD	T22	T2	9	WD	T9	70	T40	T19	T17		T47		
Champions											T8	2	T13	T6	T55	T20	T51	29			

Tournament	2020	2021	2022
Championship	T22	T61	
Match Play	NT^{2}	T18	T35
Invitational		T31	
Champions	NT^{2}	NT^{2}	NT^{2}

^{1}Cancelled due to 9/11
^{2}Cancelled due to COVID-19 pandemic

Top 10
Did not play

QF, R16, R32, R64 = Round in which player lost in match play
"T" = Tied
WD = Withdrew
NT = No tournament
Note that the HSBC Champions did not become a WGC event until 2009.
Note that the Championship and Invitational were discontinued from 2022.

== Career earnings and year-end ranking by year ==
Season	PGA Tour ($)	Rank	European Tour (€)	Rank	OWGR	
Season	PGA Tour ($)	Rank	European Tour (€)	Rank	Avg. points	Rank
1994			171,251	43	1.04	252
1995	6,380	266	112,608	75	0.67	258
1996			600,171	6	2.45	64
1997	155,645	138	824,205	3	5.26	23
1998	599,586	46	1,140,141	3	8.65	8
1999	384,097	106	1,320,805	2	7.85	6
2000	293,303	n/a†	3,125,147	1	9.46	5
2001	76,821	n/a†	390,613	52	3.26	28
2002	94,710	n/a†	308,339	75	0.84	182
2003	63,590	n/a†	1,330,713	7	2.00	65
2004	526,899	n/a†	1,592,766	7	3.21	24
2005	501,267	142	724,865	27	2.57	41
2006	630,566	130	960,304	24	2.39	49
2007	288,280	177	1,420,327	10	3.27	23
2008	1,550,880	57	2,424,642	3	4.73	10
2009	1,085,414	n/a†	4,237,762	1	6.60	4
2010	3,399,954	n/a†	3,222,423	3	9.24	1
2011	970,446	n/a†	2,439,601	5	8.06	2
2012	3,016,569	24	1,671,456	12	6.03	7
2013	2,081,731	31	1,299,694	15	3.69	25
2014	1,223,104	85	1,072,448	27	3.28	26
2015	946,628	108	936,845	38	2.58	50
2016	1,026,810	n/a†	1,828,802	13	2.64	42
2017	280,266	n/a†	1,239,846	28	2.01	64
2018	37,637	n/a†	1,908,089	17	2.05	62
2019	503,500	n/a†	1,226,289	36	2.03	59
2020	280,000	n/a†	2,279,736	1	6.36	36
2021	3,435,368	30	384,456	107	5.379	37
Total*	23,459,451	71	38,427,980	1		

*As of 2021 seasons.
†Non-member earnings.

== Team appearances ==
Amateur

- European Boys' Team Championship (representing England): 1990, 1991
- Jacques Léglise Trophy (representing Great Britain & Ireland): 1990 (winners), 1991 (winners)

Professional

- Ryder Cup (representing Europe): 1997 (winners), 1999, 2002 (winners), 2004 (winners), 2006 (winners), 2008, 2010 (winners), 2012 (winners), 2014 (winners), 2016, 2021

Ryder Cup points record
1997	1999	2002	2004	2006	2008	2010	2012	2014	2016	2021	Total
2	2	3	4.5	4	1	2.5	2	2	0	1	24

- Alfred Dunhill Cup (representing England): 1996, 1997, 1998, 1999
- Seve Trophy (representing Great Britain & Ireland): 2000, 2002 (winners), 2003 (winners), 2011 (winners)
- Royal Trophy (representing Europe): 2007 (winners)
- EurAsia Cup (representing Europe): 2016 (winners)

== See also ==
- List of golfers with most European Tour wins
- List of golfers with most Asian Tour wins
