= Mathias Grönberg =

Swedish professional golfer (born 1970)

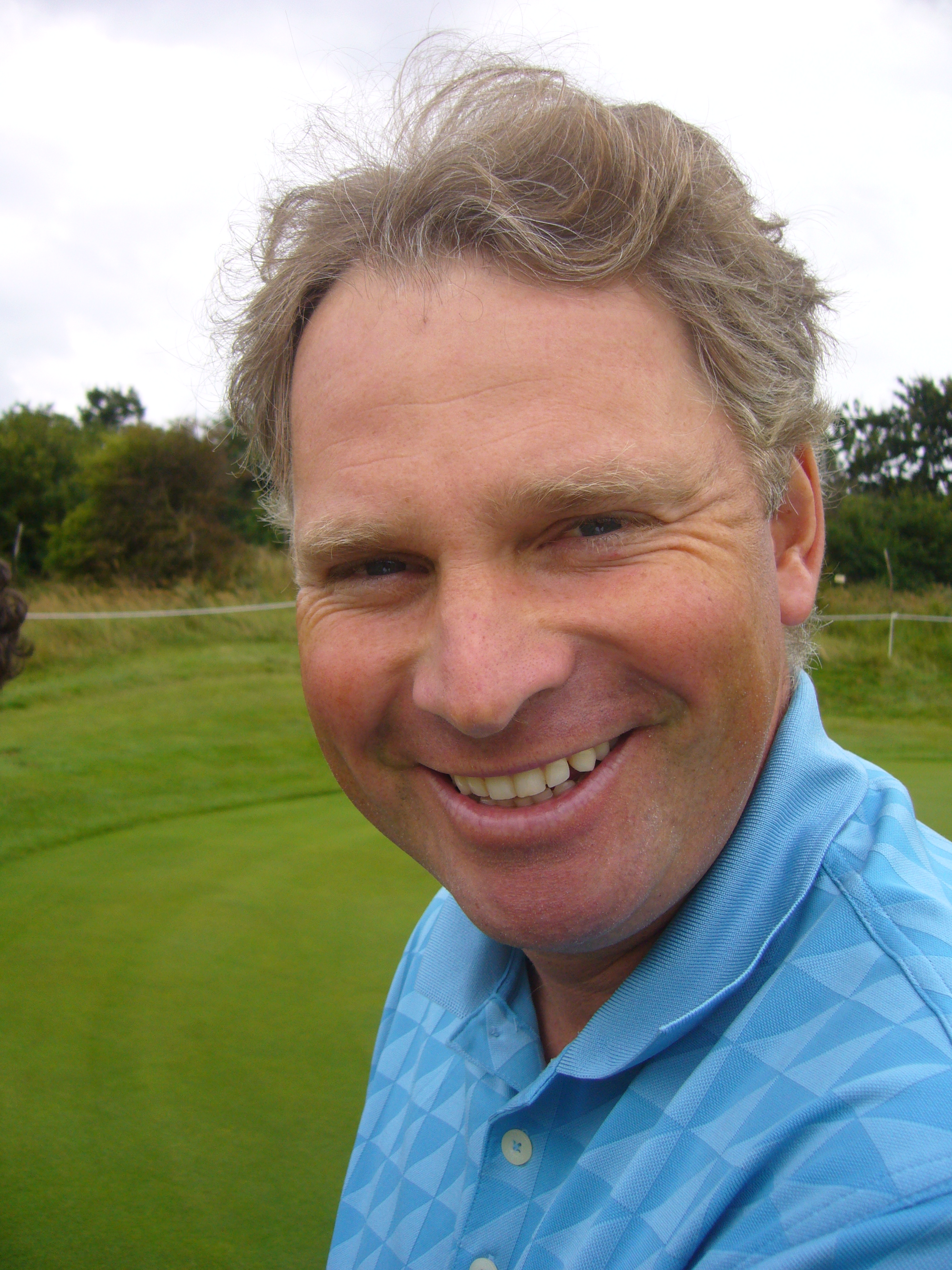

Personal information
- Full name: David Mathias Grönberg
- Nationality: Sweden
- Born: 12 March 1970 (age 56) Stockholm, Sweden
- Height: 1.83 m (6 ft 0 in)
- Weight: 86 kg (190 lb; 13.5 st)
- Children: 3

Career
- Sport: Golf
- College: Swedish Golf Academy
- Turned professional: 1990
- Former tours: PGA Tour; European Tour; Web.com Tour; Challenge Tour
- Professional wins: 6
- Highest ranking: 65 (12 October 2003)

Number of wins by tour
- European Tour: 4
- Korn Ferry Tour: 1
- Challenge Tour: 1

Best results in major championships
- Masters Tournament: DNP
- PGA Championship: CUT: 2000, 2001, 2003
- U.S. Open: T74: 2001
- The Open Championship: T18: 2003

Mathias David Grönberg (born 12 March 1970) is a Swedish professional golfer who now lives in the United States. He has played on the European Tour and PGA Tour.

== Amateur career ==
In 1970, Grönberg was born in Stockholm, Sweden. In 1988, at the age of 18, Grönberg won the Swedish Boys Championship.

In 1990, Grönberg won the British Youths Open Amateur Championship. That year he helped Sweden to win the Eisenhower Trophy and also won the individual title.

== Professional career ==
In 1990, Grönberg turned professional. After starting out on the second-tier Challenge Tour, he was a member of the European Tour from 1994 to 2003, winning four events in that timespan. His best finish on the European Tour Order of Merit was tenth in 1998.

However, Grönberg was keen to join the PGA Tour in the United States, repeatedly entering its Qualifying Tournament. In 2003, after six failed attempts, he earned medalist honors. Grönberg had difficulty settling on the PGA Tour and after his 2005 second season he had to return to the Qualifying Tournament to retain his card, which he did. His best finish in a tour event was a 3rd place finish at the 2007 Valero Texas Open, three behind Justin Leonard.

In 2008, the first Mathias Grönberg Trophy event took place in Sweden. Grönberg's goal is to make golf more popular with young children in his home country. It is an annual event that is being played at Kårsta Golf Club.

In 2009, Grönberg won his first title on the Nationwide Tour at the Melwood Prince George's County Open where he won by six strokes over Esteban Toledo and Justin Bolli. He finished 24th on the money list to earn his 2010 PGA Tour card.

== Personal life ==
Grönberg is married to Tara. They have three children.

Grönberg lives in West Palm Beach, Florida.

== Amateur wins ==
- 1988 Swedish Boys Championship
- 1990 British Youths Open Amateur Championship
- 1991 Swedish Open

== Professional wins (6) ==
=== European Tour wins (4) ===
No.	Date	Tournament	Winning score	Margin of victory	Runners-up
1	3 Sep 1995	Canon European Masters	−18 (70-65-66-69=270)	2 strokes	(England) Barry Lane, (Italy) Costantino Rocca
2	23 Aug 1998	Smurfit European Open	−13 (68-71-67-69=275)	10 strokes	(Spain) Miguel Ángel Jiménez, (Wales) Phillip Price
3	23 Jan 2000	Mercedes-Benz South African Open^{1}	−14 (70-70-67-67=274)	1 stroke	(South Africa) Darren Fichardt, (Argentina) Ricardo González, (Zimbabwe) Nick Price
4	4 May 2003	Italian Open Telecom Italia	−17 (71-67-68-65=271)	2 strokes	(Argentina) Ricardo González, (Spain) José Manuel Lara, (Scotland) Colin Montgomerie

^{1}Co-sanctioned by the Southern Africa Tour

European Tour playoff record (0–1)

No.	Year	Tournament	Opponents	Result
1	2001	Victor Chandler British Masters	(England) David Howell, (Sweden) Robert Karlsson, (France) Thomas Levet	Levet won with birdie on third extra hole Howell and Karlsson eliminated by par on first hole

=== Nationwide Tour wins (1) ===
No.	Date	Tournament	Winning score	Margin of victory	Runners-up
1	7 Jun 2009	Melwood Prince George's County Open	−19 (68-69-67-65=269)	6 strokes	(United States) Justin Bolli, (Mexico) Esteban Toledo

Nationwide Tour playoff record (0–1)

No.	Year	Tournament	Opponent	Result
1	2009	Northeast Pennsylvania Classic	(England) Gary Christian	Lost to birdie on ninth extra hole

=== Challenge Tour wins (1) ===
No.	Date	Tournament	Winning score	Margin of victory	Runner-up
1	21 Jul 1991	SM Match Play	19 holes		(Sweden) Mats Sterner

Challenge Tour playoff record (0–1)

No.	Year	Tournament	Opponents	Result
1	1992	Zambia Open	(England) Mark Nichols, (England) Jeremy Robinson	Robinson won with birdie on first extra hole

== Results in major championships ==
Tournament	1995	1996	1997	1998	1999
U.S. Open					CUT
The Open Championship	CUT				CUT
PGA Championship					

Tournament	2000	2001	2002	2003	2004	2005	2006	2007	2008	2009	2010
U.S. Open		T74									CUT
The Open Championship		CUT	CUT	T18	T47						
PGA Championship	CUT	CUT		CUT							

Note: Grönberg never played in the Masters Tournament.

Did not play

CUT = missed the half-way cut
"T" = tied

== Results in The Players Championship ==
Tournament	2007	2008
The Players Championship	T72	CUT

CUT = missed the halfway cut
"T" indicates a tie for a place

== Results in World Golf Championships ==
Tournament	2000	2001
Match Play		R64
Championship	T42	NT^{1}
Invitational		

^{1}Cancelled due to 9/11

Did not play

QF, R16, R32, R64 = Round in which player lost in match play
"T" = Tied
NT = No tournament

== Team appearances ==
Amateur

- European Amateur Team Championship (representing Sweden): 1989
- Eisenhower Trophy (representing Sweden): 1990 (winning team and individual leader)

Professional

- Alfred Dunhill Cup (representing Sweden): 1998, 2000
- World Cup (representing Sweden): 1998, 2000
- Seve Trophy (representing Continental Europe): 2002

== See also ==
- 2003 PGA Tour Qualifying School graduates
- 2005 PGA Tour Qualifying School graduates
- 2008 PGA Tour Qualifying School graduates
- 2009 Nationwide Tour graduates
