= Patrik Sjöland =

Swedish professional golfer (born 1971)

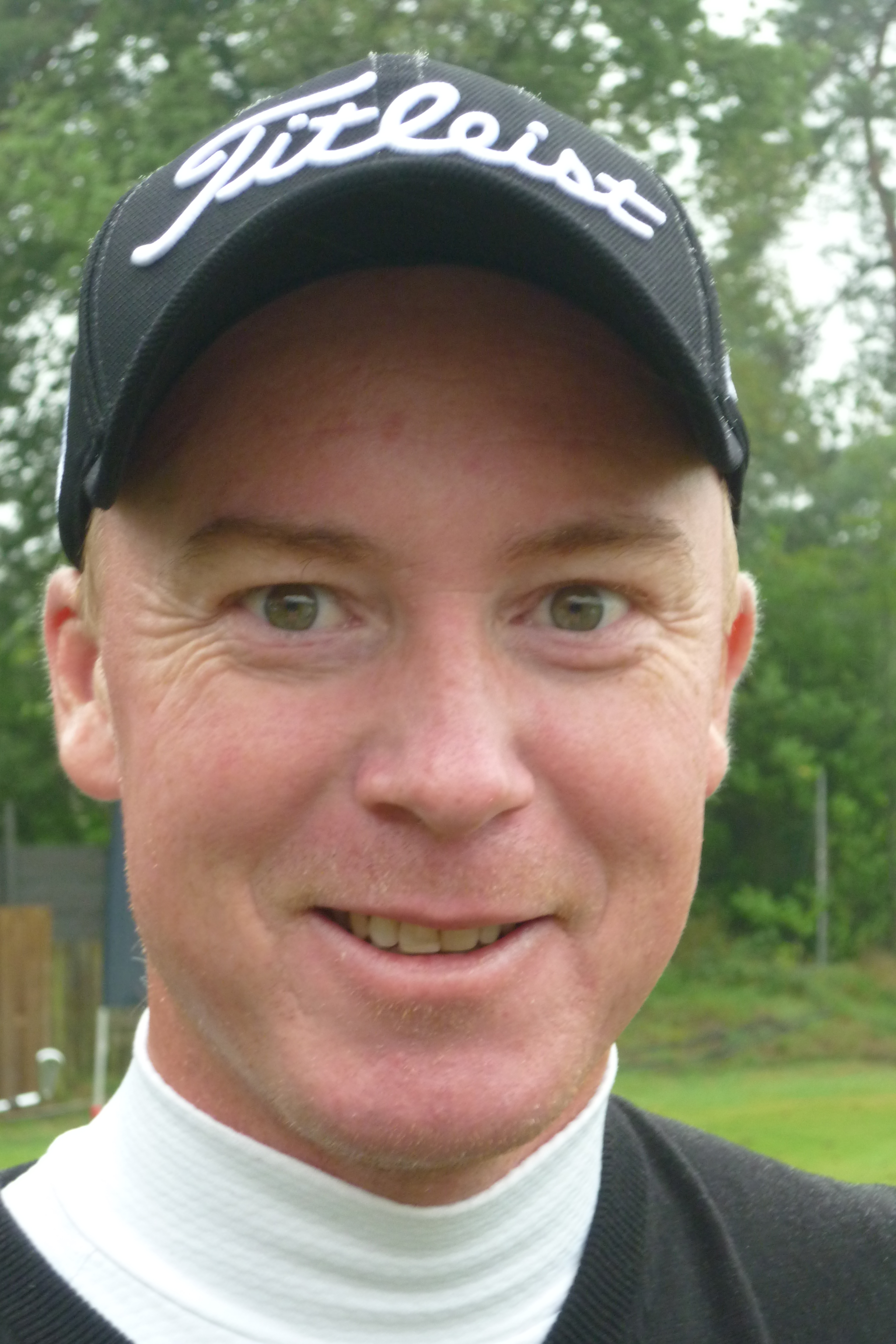

Personal information
- Full name: Patrik Sjöland
- Nationality: Sweden
- Born: 13 May 1971 (age 55) Borås, Sweden
- Height: 1.75 m (5 ft 9 in)
- Weight: 74 kg (163 lb; 11.7 st)

Career
- Sport: Golf
- Turned professional: 1990
- Current tour: European Senior Tour
- Former tours: European Tour; Challenge Tour
- Professional wins: 8
- Highest ranking: 48 (13 September 1998)

Number of wins by tour
- European Tour: 2
- Asian Tour: 1
- Challenge Tour: 1
- European Senior Tour: 1
- Other: 3

Best results in major championships
- Masters Tournament: CUT: 1999
- PGA Championship: CUT: 1998, 1999
- U.S. Open: CUT: 1999
- The Open Championship: T18: 1999

Achievements and awards
- European Senior Tour Rookie of the Year: 2023

Patrik Sjöland (born 13 May 1971) is a Swedish professional golfer. He played on the European Tour for fifteen season where he won twice, the 1998 Italian Open and 2000 Murphy's Irish Open. He also won the 1999 Hong Kong Open.

== Early life ==
Sjöland was born in Borås.

== Professional career ==
Sjöland turned professional in 1990 and joined the second tier Challenge Tour, where he tied for 3rd at the 1990 Stiga Open and 1993 Danish Open, before winning the 1995 Open Divonne in France. He finished 8th in the rankings to graduate to the European Tour for the start of the 1996 season.

=== European Tour ===
Sjöland played 15 seasons on the European Tour between 1996 and 2014. His most successful year by far was 1998, when he finished 5th on the European Tour Order of Merit and featured in the top 50 of the Official World Golf Rankings, after he won the Italian Open and recorded runner-up finishes at the Qatar Masters and Volvo PGA Championship at Wentworth, and lost a playoff at the Canon European Masters in Switzerland. He tied for 5th individually at the 1998 World Cup of Golf in New Zealand, 3 strokes behind winner Scott Verplank.

His next strong season was in 2000, where he won the Murphy's Irish Open and was runner-up at the Dubai Desert Classic. After a poor 2005 season, during which he slipped outside the top 100 on the Order of Merit and lost his European Tour card, he took a break from the tour, playing just two tournaments in 2006.

Sjöland secured a return to the European Tour at the end of season qualifying school season in 2006. He was unable to regain his early career form during 2007 and returned to qualifying school at the end of the year where he again regained his card, helped by a holed 7 iron for eagle during the final round. Having again missed out on retaining his card again in 2008, he was not able to repeat the trick and would have limited opportunities in 2009, only making 15 starts, and went back to q-school to keep his card for 2010.

Sjöland has won several other tournaments around the world, including the 1999 Hong Kong Open, a stroke ahead of Ian Woosnam.

His best performance in a major came at the 1999 Open Championship at Carnoustie, where he was tied 4th alongside Greg Norman and Tiger Woods after the second round, and ultimately finished tied 18th.

=== Senior Tour ===
Sjöland joined the European Senior Tour in 2023, where he won the Farmfoods European Senior Masters at La Manga Club, was runner-up at the MCB Tour Championship, and named European Senior Tour Rookie of the Year.

In 2024, he lost a playoff to Adilson da Silva at the OFX Irish Legends, and in 2025 he was runner-up at the WINSTONgolf Senior Open in Germany, behind Bernhard Langer.

== Professional wins (8) ==
=== European Tour wins (2) ===
No.	Date	Tournament	Winning score	Margin of victory	Runner(s)-up
1	3 May 1998	Italian Open	−21 (64-65-66=195) (Note: Shortened to 54 holes due to weather.)	3 strokes	(Sweden) Joakim Haeggman, (Spain) José María Olazábal
2	2 Jul 2000	Murphy's Irish Open	−14 (64-65-71-70=270)	2 strokes	(Sweden) Freddie Jacobson

European Tour playoff record (0–1)

No.	Year	Tournament	Opponent	Result
1	1998	Canon European Masters	(Germany) Sven Strüver	Lost to birdie on first extra hole

=== Asian PGA Tour wins (1) ===
No.	Date	Tournament	Winning score	Margin of victory	Runner-up
1	28 Nov 1999	Perrier Hong Kong Open	−11 (70-65-62-72=269)	1 stroke	(Wales) Ian Woosnam

=== Challenge Tour wins (1) ===
No.	Date	Tournament	Winning score	Margin of victory	Runner-up
1	9 Jul 1995	Open Divonne	−16 (68-66-66-69=272)	5 strokes	(France) Nicolas Kalouguine

=== Nordic Golf League wins (2) ===
No.	Date	Tournament	Winning score	Margin of victory	Runner(s)-up
1	20 Jun 2004	Husqvarna Open	−7 (67-66=133)	2 strokes	(Sweden) Daniel Lindgren, (Finland) Thomas Sundström
2	14 Jul 2013	Gant Open	−8 (65-69-71=205)	Playoff	(Sweden) Fredrik Gustavsson

=== Other wins (1) ===
- 2005 Madrid Federation Championship (Peugeot Tour, Spain)

=== European Senior Tour wins (1) ===
No.	Date	Tournament	Winning score	Margin of victory	Runner-up
1	5 Nov 2023	Farmfoods European Senior Masters	−14 (67-70-68=205)	1 stroke	(Argentina) Ricardo González

European Senior Tour playoff record (0–1)

No.	Year	Tournament	Opponent	Result
1	2024	OFX Irish Legends	(Brazil) Adilson da Silva	Lost to birdie on third extra hole

== Results in major championships ==
Tournament	1998	1999	2000	2001	2002	2003	2004	2005
Masters Tournament		CUT						
U.S. Open		CUT						
The Open Championship	T38	T18	CUT		CUT			73
PGA Championship	CUT	CUT						

Did not play

CUT = missed the half-way cut
"T" = tied

== Results in World Golf Championships ==
Tournament	1999	2000	2001
Match Play	R16		R64
Championship			NT^{1}
Invitational			

^{1}Cancelled due to 9/11

Top 10
Did not play

QF, R16, R32, R64 = Round in which player lost in match play
NT = No tournament

== Team appearances ==
- Alfred Dunhill Cup (representing Sweden): 1996, 1998, 1999, 2000
- World Cup (representing Sweden): 1996, 1998, 1999

== See also ==
- 2006 European Tour Qualifying School graduates
- 2007 European Tour Qualifying School graduates
- 2009 European Tour Qualifying School graduates
- 2013 European Tour Qualifying School graduates
