= Valentín Barrios =

Spanish golfer

Personal information
- Full name: Valentín Barrios González
- Nationality: Spain
- Born: 7 April 1942 (age 84) Madrid, Spain

Career
- Sport: Golf
- Status: Professional
- Former tour: European Tour
- Professional wins: 3

Best results in major championships
- Masters Tournament: DNP
- PGA Championship: DNP
- U.S. Open: DNP
- The Open Championship: T49: 1971

Valentín Barrios González (born 7 April 1942) is a Spanish professional golfer. He won the 1971 Madrid Open, the 1972 Algarve Open and was one of the winning pair in the 1972 Marlboro Nations' Cup. He represented Spain three times in the World Cup. On October 14, 1977, he played 18 holes of golf at the La Moraleja Golf Course in Alcobendas, near Madrid with club president César de Zulueta against World Cup champion Manuel Piñero and Bing Crosby. On their way back to the clubhouse, Crosby died of a heart attack.

== Golf career ==
Barrios was runner-up in the 1963 Open de España but he was at his best during the late 1960s and early 1970s. He was runner-up in the 1970 Italian BP Open and the 1970 German Open and won the 1971 Madrid Open and the 1972 Algarve Open. Representing Spain, he partnered with Ángel Gallardo and won the 1972 Marlboro Nations' Cup, beating the Welsh pair of Brian Huggett and David Vaughan in the final. He also won the 1973 Lancia D'Oro invitation tournament at Biella Golf Club near Magnano, Italy.

Barrios played on the European Tour in the 1970s. He never won a European Tour event but one the European circuit events he won, the 1971 Madrid Open, would be incorporated into the European Tour while the Lancia d'Oro, which he won in 1973, was part of the European Tour the previous season. His best finishes on the European Tour was second place which he recorded three times: at the 1972 Spanish Open, 1972 Italian Open, and 1974 Madrid Open. He twice lost in a playoff, at the third playoff hole against Antonio Garrido in the 1972 Spanish Open and at the first playoff hole at the 1974 Madrid Open.

== Professional wins (3) ==
- 1971 Madrid Open
- 1972 Algarve Open
- 1973 Lancia d'Oro

== Playoff record ==
European Tour playoff record (0–2)

No.	Year	Tournament	Opponent	Result
1	1972	Spanish Open	(Spain) Antonio Garrido	Lost to birdie on third extra hole
2	1974	Madrid Open	(Spain) Manuel Piñero	Lost to birdie on first extra hole

== Results in major championships ==
Tournament	1969	1970	1971
The Open Championship	CUT	CUT	T49

Note: Barrios only played in the Open Championship.
CUT = missed the half-way cut (3rd round cut in 1969 Open Championship)
"T" = tied

== Team appearances ==
- World Cup (representing Spain): 1966, 1972, 1973
- Double Diamond International (representing Continental Europe): 1972
- Marlboro Nations' Cup (representing Spain): 1972 (winners), 1973
- Hennessy Cognac Cup (representing Continent of Europe): 1974
