= Jan Dorrestein =

Dutch professional golfer (1945–2023)

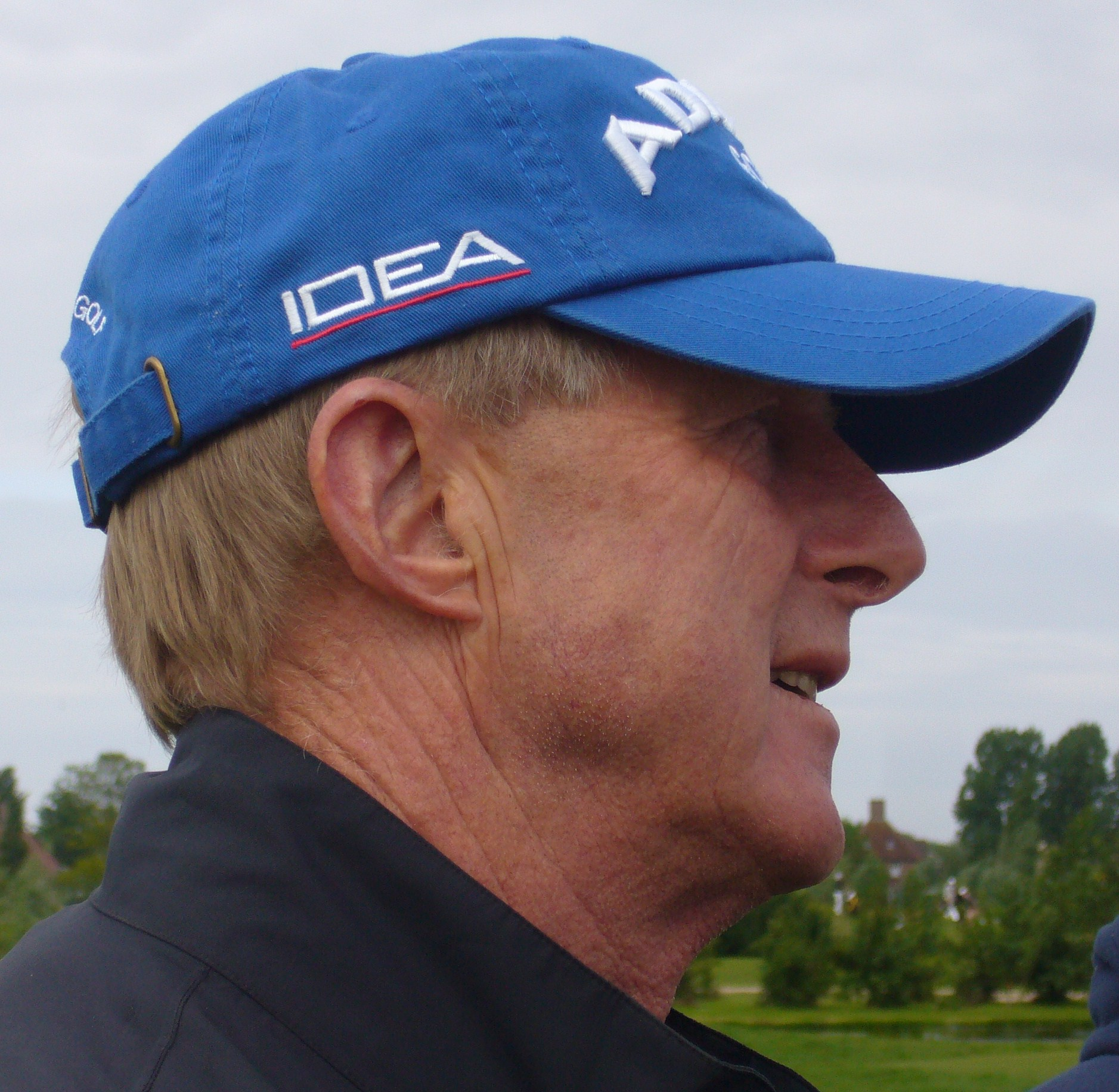
- Dorrestein in 2009

Personal information
- Full name: Johannes Gerardus Maria Dorrestein
- Nationality: Netherlands
- Born: 9 August 1945 Soest, Netherlands
- Died: 5 April 2023 (aged 77)
- Height: 1.78 m (5 ft 10 in)

Career
- Sport: Golf
- Turned professional: 1965
- Former tours: European Tour; European Seniors Tour
- Professional wins: 5

Best results in major championships
- Masters Tournament: DNP
- PGA Championship: DNP
- U.S. Open: DNP
- The Open Championship: T15: 1972

Johannes Gerardus Maria Dorrestein (9 August 1945 – 5 April 2023) was a Dutch professional golfer.

== Early life ==
Dorrestein was born in Soest, Netherlands on 9 August 1945. His father was a golf professional. In addition, both of his brothers became golf professionals.

== Professional career ==
In 1965, Dorrestein turned pro. In April 1970 Dorrestein played the Kenya Open. Dorrestein opened well with a 66. He subsequently played well with rounds of 70-67-70 to finish at 273. He defeated Malcolm Gregson, Ronnie Shade, and Bob Tuohy by 14 shots. It was his first professional win. Later in the year he represented the Netherlands in the 1970 World Cup.

The following year he played in the 1971 Open Championship. He missed the cut. Later in the year Dorrestein again represented the Netherlands at the 1971 World Cup. His teammate was Bertus van Mook. Dorrestein opened with a 76 and van Mook shot a 74 to put their team in the middle of the pack. In the second round Dorrestein shot a 70 to put him, in the individual standings, in a tie for 17th, ten back of the lead. His team would eventually finish in 18th place among 46 teams.

In 1972 Dorrestein played 16 events on the European Tour. He missed the cut in his first four events. However, he recorded a top-25 in his fifth event, the Martini International. He also recorded a top-25 at his seventh event of the year, the Scottish Open. The next event he played was the 1972 Open Championship at Muirfield. Dorrestein shot rounds of 74-71-72-72 to finish in a tie of 15th, eleven strokes behind winner Lee Trevino. For the remainder of the year Dorrestein never came close to winning but made the second round cut at his remaining eight tournaments.

Later in the year Dorrestein became a "resident in Australia" and played extensively in the Australasian region. In early November he played the Dunlop International, an elite international tournament at Yarra Yarra Golf Club in Melbourne, Australia. Dorrestein finished in a tie for 17th with, among others, and Tom Weiskopf. At the star-studded field, Dorrestein defeated notable golfers like Gary Player and Graham Marsh. Shortly thereafter, Dorrestein participated at the 1972 World Cup at Royal Melbourne Golf Club. Dorrestein opened with a 72 to put him in a tie for seventh among individuals, two back of the lead. In the second round Dorrestein shot a 74 but was still relatively close to the individual lead, seven back, in a tie for 9th place. In the third round − which was also the final round − he shot 79. He finished in a tie for 17th among individual competitors. His team finished in a tie for 14th place at 463, 25 shots behind the leading team of Taiwan. In December he played a pro-am in Taupō, New Zealand. He shot a 71 to finish in a tie for third place, four behind champion Stewart Ginn. The following week he played the New Zealand PGA Championship. In the first round he shot an even-par 71. In the second round he shot a 66 (−5) to move him into a tie for third place with Takaaki Kono, two back of leaders Ginn and Walter Godfrey. Dorrestein shot even-par for the remainder of the tournament and finished at 279 (−5), in a tie for fourth place with Ginn, four back of champion Kel Nagle.

Shortly thereafter he started playing tournaments in Africa and Europe again. In early March he played the Kenya Open. He opened with rounds of 69 and 70 to put him near the lead. In the third round he shot 68 (−4) to tie Englishman David Jagger for the lead. In the final round he again shot under-par, shooting a 69 (−3) to defeat Jagger by one. His final total was 276 (−12). For the European Tour, the first tournament he played was the Spanish Open. Despite "stiff breezes," Dorrestein opened well at the La Manga Golf Course, shooting a 68 (−4), putting one back of the lead of Tony Jacklin and Neil Coles. However, he shot over-par the next three rounds and finished T-27. For the remainder of the European season, Dorrestein played 16 events and was in the money for ten of them. Later in the year he played the 1973 World Cup. In the first round he shot a 73. With his teammate, again Bertus van Mook, they were at 149, in solo 13th place, 12 shots behind the leading Argentina team.

In 1974 Dorrestein played the European Tour again. He played in 17 events and was in the money in 11 of them. Late in the year he participated in the 1974 World Cup. In the first round he shot a 74 to put him in a tie for fifth in the individual competition, three behind the lead of South Africa's Bobby Cole. After two rounds, Dorrestein's 141 put him in solo 8th place, six behind leader Jumbo Ozaki. After three rounds, the combined totals between Dorrestein and van Mook led to 444, for solo 17th place. Ultimately, their team finished in a tie for solo 19th among 46 teams.

In 1975 Dorrestein continued to play on the European Tour. He was in the money in four of seven events, including the 1975 Open Championship.

The following year, in 1976, Dorrestein only played a handful of events on the European Tour. The first event he played was the Spanish Open. He opened with rounds of 73 to make the second round cut. However, he then shot an 80 to miss the third round cut. In his second tournament he played the 1976 Open Championship. In the opening round he shot an even-par 72. It tied him for tenth place with Johnny Miller, Bob Charles, Gary Player, and Hubert Green. However, Dorrestein shot a second round 81 (+9) to miss the second round cut. A month later he played his third and final event, the Dutch Open. He missed the cut. Once again, late in the year Dorrestein represented the Netherlands at the World Cup. He opened poorly with rounds of 76–77 to put him 15 shots behind leader Kuo Chie-Hsiung of Taiwan. In the third round he improved slightly with a 74 but was still well behind leader Kuo of Taiwan. In the final round he shot 83 to finish well behind.

For the remainder of the 1970s, the only significant events Dorrestein played were the Dutch Open and the World Cup. He did not record many high results. In 1980 Dorrestein again intended to play in the World Cup. The two-men Dutch team traveled to Bogotá, Colombia, but were forced to withdraw prior to the start of the tournament due to illness. In 1983 he represented the Netherlands for the final time at the 1983 World Cup. It was the 12th time he represented his country in the event.

Since this period Dorrestein has worked primarily as a golf coach. According to the European Tour, he has been an "outstanding teacher" of the game.

=== Senior career ===
In 1995 Dorrestein turned 50. He soon started playing in some senior events. Late in 1995 he won the Netherlands Senior Championships. The following year he played on the European Senior Tour for the first time. He played in four events and was in the money at three of them. He also successfully defended his Netherlands Senior Championships. In 1997 he again played on the European Senior Tour. At his first event for the 1997 season, he recorded a T-6 at the Beko Senior Turkish Open. However, he did not perform as well through the remainder of the year, missing the cut in five of his nine remaining events, failing to record any more top tens. However, late in the year he successfully defended his Netherlands Senior Championship. In 1998 he again played extensively on the European Senior Tour. He played in twelve events and was in the money in six of them. In 1999 Dorrestein played on the senior tour for the final time. In his first four events, he failed to make the third round in any of them. His fifth event was the Senior British Open. He opened with a 73 to put himself in a tie for 9th place. However, he shot a second round 88 to miss the cut by a wide margin. In the remaining four events, he was in the money in only one of them. He did not play on the European Senior Tour full-time again. In the ensuing years, he consistently played in the Senior British Open and some notable Dutch events. However, he did not record many high finishes. In 2005 he played the Senior British Open for one of the final times. He opened poorly with an 80, however. He shot a second round 85 and missed the cut by a wide margin.

== Death ==
Dorrestein died on 5 April 2023, at the age of 77.

== Professional wins (5) ==
- 1970 Kenya Open
- 1973 Kenya Open
- 1995 Netherlands Senior Championships
- 1996 Netherlands Senior Championships
- 1997 Netherlands Senior Championships

== Results in major championships ==
Tournament	1971	1972	1973	1974	1975	1976
The Open Championship	CUT	T15	CUT		61	CUT

Did not play

CUT = missed the half-way cut
"T" indicates a tie for a place

== Team appearances ==
- World Cup (representing the Netherlands): 1970, 1971, 1972, 1973, 1974, 1975, 1976, 1977, 1978, 1979, 1982, 1983
- Philip Morris International (representing the Netherlands): 1972, 1973
- Double Diamond International (representing Continental Europe): 1973, 1974
- Hennessy Cognac Cup (representing the Rest of Europe): 1974
