= Bernard Gallacher =

Scottish professional golfer (born 1949)

Bernard Gallacher OBE
Personal information
- Nationality: Scotland
- Born: 9 February 1949 (age 77) Bathgate, Scotland
- Height: 5 ft 9 in (1.75 m)
- Weight: 175 lb (79 kg; 12.5 st)
- Spouse: Lesley
- Children: 3, including Kirsty

Career
- Sport: Golf
- Turned professional: 1967
- Former tours: European Tour; European Seniors Tour
- Professional wins: 23

Number of wins by tour
- European Tour: 10
- European Senior Tour: 1
- Other: 12

Best results in major championships
- Masters Tournament: CUT: 1970
- PGA Championship: DNP
- U.S. Open: DNP
- The Open Championship: T18: 1973

Achievements and awards
- Sir Henry Cotton Rookie of the Year: 1968
- Harry Vardon Trophy: 1969

Bernard Gallacher (born 9 February 1949) is a Scottish retired professional golfer. He captained the Europe team to victory in the 1995 Ryder Cup.

== Early life and amateur career ==
Gallacher was born in Bathgate in West Lothian, Scotland. He took up golf at the age of eleven.

In 1965, he won the Lothians Golf Association Boys Championship. He won the 1967 Scottish Amateur Open Stroke Play Championship and turned professional the same year.

== Professional career ==
He won the Sir Henry Cotton Rookie of the Year award in 1968. His first professional wins came in 1969; a pair of them in Zambia and another pair in Europe in the equivalent of European Tour events. (The European Tour wasn't established until 1972.) He finished 1969 as Order of merit winner earning the Harry Vardon Trophy.

He accumulated ten wins on the European Tour between 1974 and 1984 and finished in the top ten on the European Tour Order of Merit five times between 1972 and 1982, with a best placing of third in 1974.

In 1969, at the age of 20, Gallacher became the youngest man to represent Great Britain in the Ryder Cup up to that time. This record was subsequently beaten by Nick Faldo and others. He went on to play in the Ryder Cup eight times and was non-playing captain of the European Team in 1991, 1993 and 1995. All three of those matches were very close; Europe lost the first two but won the third.

After turning 50, Gallacher played on the European Seniors Tour. His first senior win came at The Mobile Cup in 2002.

Gallacher was the professional at the Wentworth Club near London for 25 years until the end of 1996. He wrote a column for Scottish golf magazine bunkered from 1998 until 2008.

== Personal life ==
Gallacher's daughter Kirsty was a presenter on Sky Sports News for 20 years. Another daughter, blogger and former restaurateur Laura Gallacher, is married to English comedian, and convicted sex offender, Russell Brand.

Gallacher is uncle to professional golfer Stephen Gallacher, European Tour winner and Ryder Cup player.

In August 2014, Gallacher was one of 200 public figures who were signatories to a letter to The Guardian opposing Scottish independence in the run-up to September's referendum on that issue.

== Awards and honors ==
- In 1968, Gallacher earned the Sir Henry Cotton Rookie of the Year award, bestowed to the British PGA's Rookie of the Year.
- In 1969, he won the British PGA's Order of Merit thereby earning the, Harry Vardon Trophy.
- In 1996, Gallacher was awarded the OBE for services to golf.
- On 19 March 2010, a life size bronze sculpture of Gallacher, in teeing-off position, was unveiled close to the first tee of the West Course at the Wentworth Club, England.
- In November 2013, The Scottish Golf Awards, jointly organized by the Scottish Golf Union and the Scottish Ladies’ Golfing Association, announced Gallacher to be honoured with the 2013 Lifetime Achievement Award, which he received at the Scottish Golf Awards gala on 28 February 2014 in Glasgow.
- In August 2022, Gallacher received the honour of Life Membership of Professional Golfers' Association.

== Amateur wins ==
- 1967 Scottish Amateur Open Stroke Play Championship, Tennant Cup

== Professional wins (23) ==
=== European Tour wins (10) ===
No.	Date	Tournament	Winning score	Margin of victory	Runner(s)-up
1	23 Jun 1974	Carroll's Celebration International	−17 (72-71-68-68=279)	3 strokes	(Australia) Jack Newton
2	5 Oct 1974	Dunlop Masters	−2 (71-70-69-72=282)	Playoff	(South Africa) Gary Player
3	4 Oct 1975	Dunlop Masters (2)	+5 (74-70-71-74=289)	2 strokes	(South Africa) Dale Hayes
4	16 Apr 1977	Spanish Open	−11 (70-68-70-69=277)	2 strokes	(Spain) Francisco Abreu
5	13 May 1979	French Open	−8 (71-69-74-70=284)	1 stroke	(Scotland) Willie Milne
6	21 Sep 1980	Haig Whisky TPC	−8 (68-65-66-69=268)	3 strokes	(England) Nick Faldo, (West Germany) Bernhard Langer
7	14 Jun 1981	Cold Shield Greater Manchester Open	−16 (65-69-63-67=264)	5 strokes	(England) Nick Faldo
8	16 May 1982	Martini International	−7 (71-71-68-67=277)	3 strokes	(Spain) José María Cañizares, (England) Nick Faldo
9	6 Jun 1982	Jersey Open	−15 (69-66-68-70=273)	Playoff	(Republic of Ireland) Eamonn Darcy, (Republic of Ireland) Des Smyth
10	3 Jun 1984	Jersey Open (2)	−14 (66-71-68-69=274)	2 strokes	(Scotland) Sandy Lyle

European Tour playoff record (2–2)

No.	Year	Tournament	Opponent(s)	Result
1	1973	Portuguese Open	(Spain) Jaime Benito	Lost to par on first extra hole
2	1974	Dunlop Masters	(South Africa) Gary Player	Won with birdie on first extra hole
3	1978	European Open Championship	(United States) Gil Morgan, (United States) Bobby Wadkins	Wadkins won with birdie on first extra hole
4	1982	Jersey Open	(Republic of Ireland) Eamonn Darcy, (Republic of Ireland) Des Smyth	Won with par on fifth extra hole Darcy eliminated by birdie on second hole

=== Other wins (12) ===
- 1969 (4) Eagle Open, Cock o' the North, Schweppes PGA Championship, W.D. & H.O. Wills Tournament
- 1970 (1) Mufulira Open
- 1971 (1) Martini International
- 1973 (2) Coca-Cola Young Professionals' Championship, Scottish Professional Championship
- 1974 (1) Scottish Professional Championship
- 1977 (1) Scottish Professional Championship
- 1981 (1) Sanyo Open
- 1983 (1) Scottish Professional Championship

=== European Seniors Tour wins (1) ===
No.	Date	Tournament	Winning score	Margin of victory	Runner-up
1	14 Jul 2002	Mobile Cup	−12 (67-68-66=201)	4 strokes	(Jamaica) Delroy Cambridge

== Results in major championships ==
Tournament	1969	1970	1971	1972	1973	1974	1975	1976	1977	1978	1979
Masters Tournament		CUT									
The Open Championship	CUT	CUT	T37	CUT	T18	T24	T19	T60	CUT	T22	CUT

Tournament	1980	1981	1982	1983	1984	1985	1986	1987
Masters Tournament								
The Open Championship	CUT	CUT	T25	T19	T31	T47		CUT

Did not play

CUT = missed the half-way cut (3rd round cut in 1969 Open Championship)
"T" = tied
Note: Gallacher never played in the U.S. Open or the PGA Championship.

== Team appearances ==
- Ryder Cup (representing Great Britain and Ireland/Europe): 1969 (tie), 1971, 1973, 1975, 1977, 1979, 1981, 1983, 1991 (non-playing captain), 1993 (non-playing captain), 1995 (winners, non-playing captain)
- World Cup (representing Scotland): 1969, 1971, 1974, 1982, 1983
- Double Diamond International: 1971, 1972, 1973 (winners), 1974, 1975, 1976, 1977
- Marlboro Nations' Cup/Philip Morris International (representing Scotland): 1973 (winners), 1976
- Sotogrande Match/Hennessy Cognac Cup (representing Great Britain and Ireland): 1974 (winners), 1978 (winners), 1982 (winners), (representing Scotland) 1984 (captain)
- Datsun International (representing Great Britain and Ireland): 1976

== See also ==
- List of golfers with most European Tour wins
