= Alberto Croce =

Italian professional golfer (born 1944)

Personal information
- Nationality: Italy
- Born: 5 May 1944 (age 82)
- Height: 1.70 m (5 ft 7 in)
- Weight: 76 kg (168 lb; 12.0 st)

Career
- Sport: Golf
- Turned professional: 1966
- Former tour: European Senior Tour
- Professional wins: 8

Number of wins by tour
- European Senior Tour: 2
- Other: 6

Best results in major championships
- Masters Tournament: DNP
- PGA Championship: DNP
- U.S. Open: DNP
- The Open Championship: CUT: 1966, 1967, 1968

Alberto Croce (born 5 May 1944) is an Italian professional golfer who won twice on the European Seniors Tour.

== Professional wins (8) ==
=== Other wins (6) ===
- 1972 Rome Aloyco Tournament
- 1976 Memorial Olivier Barras
- 1978 Italian PGA Championship
- 1979 Italian PGA Championship
- 1980 Memorial Olivier Barras
- 1981 Italian PGA Championship

=== European Seniors Tour wins (2) ===
| No. | Date | Tournament | Winning score | Margin of victory | Runner-up |
|---|---|---|---|---|---|
| 1 | 4 Aug 1995 | Lawrence Batley Seniors | −4 (69-72-68=209) | 1 stroke | (England) Tommy Horton |
| 2 | 10 Oct 1999 | Greek Seniors Open | −5 (70-73-68=211) | Playoff | (Spain) Antonio Garrido |

European Seniors Tour playoff record (1–0)

| No. | Year | Tournament | Opponent | Result |
|---|---|---|---|---|
| 1 | 1999 | Greek Seniors Open | (Spain) Antonio Garrido | Won with a birdie on the fourth extra hole |

== Team appearances ==
Amateur

- St Andrews Trophy (representing the Continent of Europe): 1964, 1966

Professional

- World Cup (representing Italy): 1972, 1973
- Marlboro Nations' Cup/Philip Morris International (representing Italy): 1973, 1975
