= Lancia d'Oro =

Tournament information
- Location: Magnano, Italy
- Established: 1962
- Tour: European Tour
- Format: Stroke play
- Month played: October
- Final year: 1976

Tournament record score
- Aggregate: 281 Alfonso Angelini (1968)
- To par: −5 Luciano Grappasonni (1971) −5 José María Cañizares (1972) −5 Peter Townsend (1972)
- Score: 5 1/2–2 1/2 Team USA (1976)

Final champion
- Team USA

The Lancia d'Oro was a men's professional golf tournament held in Italy from 1962 to 1976. It was hosted at Golf Club Biella every year except for 1974, which was hosted by Turin Golf Club, during the club's 50th anniversary year. Generally, it was a limited-field invitation event but the 1972 tournament was a full-field event. And it was part of what would later be recognized as the inaugural European Tour season.

== History ==
The 1972 event was played from 19 to 22 October. The prize money was £10,000 with a first prize of £1,700. José María Cañizares led after each of the first three rounds with scores of 69, 70 and 75. However, after a final round 73 he was tied with Peter Townsend on 287. Cañizares won the playoff at the fifth extra hole with a birdie 3, after hitting a 4-iron to 2 feet from the hole.

Having not been played in 1975, the Lancia d'Oro returned in 1976 as a four-man team match play event. It was won by the United States team of Tommy Aaron, George Burns, Billy Casper, and Lee Elder who defeated the European team of Seve Ballesteros, Baldovino Dassù, Eamonn Darcy and Tony Jacklin.

== Winners ==
| Year | Winner(s) | Score | To par | Margin of victory | Runner(s)-up | Ref. |
|---|---|---|---|---|---|---|
| 1976 | Team USA (Note: Tommy Aaron, George Burns, Billy Casper and Lee Elder.) | 5 1/2–2 1/2 | | | Team Europe (Note: Seve Ballesteros, Baldovino Dassù, Eamonn Darcy and Tony Jacklin.) | |
1975: No tournament
| 1974 | (United States) Billy Casper | 209 | −5 | 5 strokes | (South Africa) Bobby Cole | |
| 1973 | (Spain) Valentín Barrios | 211 | −8 | 2 strokes | (Spain) Jaime Benito | |
| 1972 | (Spain) José María Cañizares | 287 | −5 | Playoff (Note: Cañizares won the playoff at the fifth extra hole.) | (England) Peter Townsend | |
| 1971 | (Italy) Luciano Grappasonni | 287 | −5 | 2 strokes | (Italy) Ettore Della Torre (South Africa) Dale Hayes | |
| 1970 | (Italy) Alfonso Angelini (2) | 286 | | 1 stroke | (England) Fred Boobyer | |
| 1969 | (Italy) Roberto Bernardini (3) | | | | | |
| 1968 | (Italy) Alfonso Angelini | 281 | | 3 strokes | (Italy) Roberto Bernardini (Italy) Luciano Grappasonni (South Africa) Harold Henning | |
| 1967 | (Italy) Roberto Bernardini (2) | | | | | |
| 1966 | (Italy) Roberto Bernardini | 285 | | 6 strokes | (South Africa) Denis Hutchinson | |
| 1965 | (Italy) Aldo Casera | | | | | |
| 1964 | (South Africa) Harold Henning | 288 | | Playoff (Note: Henning won the playoff at the third extra hole.) | (Belgium) Flory Van Donck | |
| 1963 | (Italy) Manuel Canessa | | | | | |
| 1962 | (Belgium) Flory Van Donck | | | | | |
