= Walworth Aloyco Tournament =

Tournament information
- Location: Rome, Italy
- Established: 1969
- Month played: April
- Final year: 1972

Final champion
- (Italy) Alberto Croce

The Walworth Aloyco Tournament was a men's professional golf tournament played from 1969 to 1972 in the Rome area of Italy. The event was held the week after the Italian BP Open. The Italian Open was restarted in 1971 and was played the week before the Italian BP Open, so that the Walworth Aloyco was the last of three consecutive weekly tournaments played in Italy. In 1972 the Italian Open moved to an autumn date. The 1971 and 1972 tournaments were played in the same week as the Masters Tournament. The 1972 tournament was not part of the inaugural European Tour season.

== Winners ==
Year	Winner	Country	Venue	Score	Margin of victory	Runner(s)-up	Winner's share (£)	Ref
Walworth Aloyco Tournament
1969	Roberto Bernardini	Italy	Acqua Santa	282				
1970	Neil Coles	England		282	3 strokes	(Republic of Ireland) Christy O'Connor Snr (Wales) Brian Huggett		
1971	Peter Townsend	England	Acqua Santa	277	2 strokes	(England) Maurice Bembridge	2,000	
Rome Aloyco Tournament
1972	Alberto Croce	Italy	Acqua Santa					
