= Salvador Balbuena =

Spanish golfer

Personal information
- Full name: Salvador Balbuena Bruna
- Nationality: Spain
- Died: 9 May 1979 (aged 29) Lyon, France

Career
- Sport: Golf
- Status: Professional
- Former tour: European Tour
- Professional wins: 2

Number of wins by tour
- European Tour: 1
- Other: 1

Best results in major championships
- Masters Tournament: DNP
- PGA Championship: DNP
- U.S. Open: DNP
- The Open Championship: CUT: 1977

Salvador Balbuena Bruna (c. 1949-1950 – 9 May 1979) was a Spanish professional golfer who won the 1976 Portuguese Open on the European Tour. He died of a heart attack on the eve of the 1979 French Open in which he was due to play.

== Professional career ==
Balbuena joined the European Tour before the 1976 season. He won the first event of the year, the Portuguese Open. In addition to winning his first tournament as a European Tour member, it was also the first golf tournament he had ever played outside his home country. Balbuena led by 5 strokes at the half-way stage and won by 4 shots from Sam Torrance. The following week he was joint leader after three rounds of the Spanish Open before fading after a final round 78. Two weeks later, at the French Open, he again led after three rounds and finished runner-up to South Africa's Vincent Tshabalala after a final round 72. The following week he made his British tour debut in the Piccadilly Medal where he had a top-10 finish. For the remainder of the season, he would miss only one cut, and finish 20th on the Order of Merit. Balbuena was selected for three team events during the season, representing Spain in the Philip Morris International and Continental Europe in the Double Diamond International and the Hennessy Cognac Cup. In November he became the first non-American to win the Morocco Grand Prix, finishing three strokes ahead of three Americans.

Balbuena played in his first major championship, the 1977 Open Championship at Turnberry, having qualified automatically by virtue of his 20th place in the 1976 Order of Merit. After his impressive first season in 1976, the following two seasons, 1977 and 1978, were similarly consistent. Although he did not win he recorded a number of top-10s finishes, including a third-place finish at the 1978 Spanish Open.

== Death ==
On 9 May 1979, tragedy struck. Balbuena was having dinner with fellow Spanish golfers Antonio Garrido, José María Cañizares, and Manuel Piñero in Lyon, France, the day before the French Open began. He suddenly had a heart attack and was rushed on an ambulance. He died on his way to the hospital. He was 29 years old.

== Professional wins (2) ==
=== European Tour wins (1) ===
No.	Date	Tournament	Winning score	Margin of victory	Runner-up
1	17 Apr 1976	Portuguese Open	−6 (68-69-74-72=283)	4 strokes	(Scotland) Sam Torrance

=== Other wins (1) ===
No.	Date	Tournament	Winning score	Margin of victory	Runners-up
1	13 Nov 1976	Morocco Grand Prix	−3 (75-71-68-75=289)	3 strokes	(United States) George Burns, (United States) Danny Edwards, (United States) Curtis Strange

== Team appearances ==
- Philip Morris International (representing Spain): 1976
- Double Diamond International (representing Continental Europe): 1976
- Hennessy Cognac Cup (representing the Continent of Europe): 1976
