= Donald Swaelens =

Belgian golfer

Personal information
- Full name: Donald Swaelens
- Nationality: Belgium
- Born: 1935 Sint-Martens-Latem, Belgium
- Died: 25 April 1975 (aged 39)

Career
- Sport: Golf
- Status: Professional
- Former tour: European Tour
- Professional wins: 13

Best results in major championships
- Masters Tournament: DNP
- PGA Championship: DNP
- U.S. Open: DNP
- The Open Championship: T7: 1974

Donald Swaelens (1935 – 25 April 1975) was a Belgian professional golfer.

== Golf career ==
Like his father Jules, Swaelens made his career as a club professional at Royal Latem Golf Club. He also worked as a touring professional, intermittently playing on the European circuit. He won the 1966 Woodlawn Tournament, played at the Ramstein Air Base in West Germany, the 1967 German Open, and the 1971 Agfa-Gevaert Tournament, also in West Germany.

In 1972, Swaelens joined the European Tour during its inaugural season. In 1973, he finished tied for second, with Dale Hayes, in the Viyella PGA Championship held at Wentworth, three shots behind Peter Oosterhuis. This would be the best finish of his European Tour career. In 1974, he finished third in the Dutch Open at Koninklijke Haagsche Golf & Country Club. He also finished T-7 at that year's Open Championship, the best finish of his career at a major championship.

Until Nicolas Colsaerts played in 2013, he was the only Belgian golfer to be invited to the Masters Tournament, although the cancer prevented him from taking part. Swaelens died two weeks after the 1975 Masters Tournament at the age of 39 from cancer.

== Memorial Tournament ==
The Donald Swaelens Memorial (later called the Donald Swaelens Challenge) is played each year celebrating his memory. The tournament was originally an 8-man professional tournament sponsored by Laurent-Perrier but is now an amateur tournament.

Winners of the trophy include:

- 1976 Seve Ballesteros
- 1977 Nick Faldo
- 1978 Nick Faldo
- 1993 Lara Tadiotto
- 1995 Arnaud Langenaeken
- 1998 Nicolas Colsaerts (when 15 years old)

== Professional wins ==
=== European circuit wins (4) ===
- 1966 Woodlawn International Invitational, Omnium International d'Evian
- 1967 German Open
- 1971 Agfa-Gevaert Tournament

=== Other wins (9) ===
- 1958 Gleneagles Hotel Foursomes Tournament (with Ian McDonald)
- 1966 Memorial Olivier Barras
- 1967 Omnium of Belgium, Memorial Olivier Barras
- 1969 Omnium of Belgium
- 1970 Omnium of Belgium
- 1971 Omnium of Belgium
- 1972 Omnium of Belgium
- 1973 Omnium of Belgium

== Results in major championships ==
Tournament	1958	1959
The Open Championship	T11	

Tournament	1960	1961	1962	1963	1964	1965	1966	1967	1968	1969
The Open Championship		CUT	23	44				CUT	CUT	T30

Tournament	1970	1971	1972	1973	1974
The Open Championship	CUT	T49	CUT	CUT	T7

Note: Swaelens only played in The Open Championship.

Top 10
Did not play

CUT = missed the half-way cut (3rd round cut in 1968 and 1970)
"T" indicates a tie for a place

== Team appearances ==
- World Cup (representing Belgium): 1958, 1959, 1961, 1962, 1963, 1964, 1965, 1966, 1967, 1968, 1969, 1970, 1971, 1972, 1973, 1974
- Joy Cup (representing the Rest of Europe): 1958
- Double Diamond International (representing Continental Europe): 1972, 1973, 1974 (captain)
- Marlboro Nations' Cup (representing Belgium): 1972, 1973
- Sotogrande Match (representing the Continent of Europe): 1974
