= John O'Leary (golfer) =

Irish golfer (1949–2020)

Personal information
- Full name: John Eudes O'Leary
- Nationality: Ireland
- Born: 19 August 1949 Dublin, Ireland
- Died: 26 March 2020 (aged 70) Esher, England
- Height: 6 ft 0 in (1.83 m)

Career
- Sport: Golf
- Turned professional: 1970
- Former tours: European Tour; Southern Africa Tour
- Professional wins: 5

Number of wins by tour
- European Tour: 2
- Sunshine Tour: 1
- Other: 2

Best results in major championships
- Masters Tournament: DNP
- PGA Championship: DNP
- U.S. Open: DNP
- The Open Championship: T13: 1979

John Eudes O'Leary (19 August 1949 – 26 March 2020) was an Irish professional golfer who played on the European Tour through the 1970s and 1980s. In 1976 he won his first European Tour event, the Greater Manchester Open, and in 1982 he became only the third Irishman to win the Irish Open. He played in a number of team competitions, representing Great Britain and Ireland in the 1975 Ryder Cup, and playing for Ireland three times in the World Cup.

After retiring as a tournament golfer he was an active administrator, being a director of the European Tour from 1985 to 2019 and being on the Ryder Cup committee.

== Amateur career ==
O'Leary was born in Dublin and joined Foxrock Golf Club, situated in the southern part of the city, as a junior member in the 1960s. In 1969, he was runner-up to Vincent Nevin in the Irish Amateur Close Championship and represented Ireland in the European Amateur Team Championship. In 1970, he won the South of Ireland Amateur Open Championship and was runner-up in the West of Ireland Amateur Open.

== Professional career ==
O'Leary turned professional in late 1970. In 1971, his first season as a professional, he made the cut in the Open Championship, having been just one off the lead after the first round, and was a runner-up in Lord Derby’s Under-23 Professional Tournament.

Although Leary played full-time on the European Tour, he played in South Africa in the winter. His first professional successes were on its tour. In December 1972 he took a three-shot lead entering the final round of the South African Masters after shooting a third-round 64 (−6). However he would slip up in the final round and Gary Player would surpass him. Later in the season, at the Western Province Open, he once again held the lead entering the final round but shot a disappointing 75 (+2) to lose to South Africa's Hugh Baiocchi by one. Two seasons later, in February 1975, O'Leary finished in third place at the South African Open behind Gary Player. The next week he finally won, winning the Holiday Inns Royal Swazi Sun Open, an official event on the South African Tour which was played in Swaziland. He shot 271 (−17) to defeat South Africans Dale Hayes and John Fourie by four shots.

Later in 1975, back in Europe, he picked up a runner-up finish at the Open de France, tying for second with fellow Irishman Eamonn Darcy and in May, playing with Jack Newton, he won the Sumrie-Bournemouth Better-Ball.

Also in February 1975, while he was in South Africa, O'Leary received a £500 fine and a one-year ban from representing any PGA team, a ban that would have ruled him out of the 1975 Ryder Cup. The ban followed complaints about his conduct in an event in Jamaica in late 1974. O'Leary appealed and the one-year ban was lifted, although the £500 fine stood. Eight members of the Great Britain and Ireland team for the 1975 Ryder Cup were chosen from the money leaders in 1975 European Tour events after the Benson & Hedges Festival on 16 August, with the remaining four members of the 12-man team selected by a committee. His performance in the Open de France, as well as three other top-10 performances, were enough for O'Leary to finish 6th among the automatic qualifiers and gain a place on the team. O'Leary played four matches in the Ryder Cup, losing all four.

The next season produced O'Leary's first European Tour win, the Greater Manchester Open. Like his first official win, it was a four-shot victory over South Africa's John Fourie. He finished a career-best 16th on that year's European Tour Order of Merit.

Afterwards, O'Leary played solidly but did not move into the upper echelon of European players. He finished in the top 60 on the Order of Merit every season through 1987 but never the top 15. The highlight during this part of his career was undoubtedly at the 1982 Carroll's Irish Open. In difficult conditions at Portmarnock, he defeated English veteran Maurice Bembridge by one shot. This avenged a one-shot defeat to Ken Brown in 1978. He was only the third Irishman to win his national open and he was the last one to win for 25 years, Pádraig Harrington being victorious in 2007.

During the 1988 and 1989 seasons, O'Leary did not come close to making the top 100 of the Order of Merit. He retired as a touring professional after the 1989 season.

From 1985 O'Leary served as one of the directors of the European Tour, leaving the position in 2019. He had also been on the Ryder Cup committee and had been head professional at Buckinghamshire Golf Club.

== Death ==
Following a short illness, O'Leary died in Esher, Surrey, United Kingdom on 26 March 2020, aged 70.

== Amateur wins ==
- 1970 South of Ireland Amateur Open

== Professional wins (5) ==
=== European Tour wins (2) ===
No.	Date	Tournament	Winning score	Margin of victory	Runner-up
1	20 Jun 1976	Greater Manchester Open	−4 (64-68-70-74=276)	4 strokes	(South Africa) John Fourie
2	15 Aug 1982	Carroll's Irish Open	−1 (74-68-72-73=287)	1 stroke	(England) Maurice Bembridge

=== Southern Africa Tour wins (1) ===
No.	Date	Tournament	Winning score	Margin of victory	Runners-up
1	9 Feb 1975	Holiday Inns Invitational	−17 (70-69-65-67=271)	4 strokes	(South Africa) John Fourie, (South Africa) Dale Hayes

=== Other wins (2) ===
- 1972 Irish Dunlop Tournament
- 1975 Sumrie-Bournemouth Better-Ball (with Jack Newton)

== Results in major championships ==
Tournament	1971	1972	1973	1974	1975	1976	1977	1978	1979	1980	1981	1982	1983	1984	1985	1986	1987
The Open Championship	T40	T56		T44	CUT	CUT	T26		T13	CUT	T58	WD	T59				T54

Did not play

CUT = missed the half-way cut (3rd round cut in 1975, 1976 and 1980 Open Championships)
WD = Withdrew
"T" = tied
Note: O'Leary only played in The Open Championship. Source:

== Team appearances ==
Amateur

- European Amateur Team Championship (representing Ireland): 1969

Professional

- World Cup (representing Ireland): 1972, 1980, 1982
- Ryder Cup (representing Great Britain & Ireland): 1975
- Double Diamond International (representing Ireland): 1972, 1973, 1974, 1975, 1976, 1977
- Marlboro Nations' Cup/Philip Morris International (representing Ireland): 1972, 1973, 1975
- Hennessy Cognac Cup (representing Great Britain and Ireland): 1976 (winners), 1978 (winners), 1982 (winners)
