= Philippe Toussaint =

Belgian golfer

Personal information
- Full name: Philippe Toussaint
- Nationality: Belgium
- Born: 30 June 1949 (age 77) Brussels, Belgium
- Height: 1.89 m (6 ft 2 in)

Career
- Sport: Golf
- Turned professional: 1971
- Former tour: European Tour
- Professional wins: 1

Number of wins by tour
- European Tour: 1

Best results in major championships
- Masters Tournament: DNP
- PGA Championship: DNP
- U.S. Open: DNP
- The Open Championship: T41: 1979

Philippe Toussaint (born 30 June 1949) was one of Belgium's most successful golfers.

== Early life and amateur career ==
Toussaint was born in Brussels. As an amateur he won the Italian Amateur Championship, was runner up in the Belgian Amateur Championship, and twice represented Belgium in the Eisenhower Trophy.

== Professional career ==
In 1971, he joined the European Tour. He won one tournament during his time on the tour, at the 1974 Benson & Hedges Festival, when he edged out Bob Shearer in a sudden death playoff.

Toussaint also represented Belgium in the World Cup on ten occasions, as well as appearing in several other team events.

== Amateur wins ==
- 1968 French Junior Championship
- 1969 Italian Amateur Championship

== Professional wins (1) ==
=== European Tour wins (1) ===
No.	Date	Tournament	Winning score	Margin of victory	Runner-up
1	17 Aug 1974	Benson & Hedges Festival of Golf	−8 (71-70-71-64=276)	Playoff	(Australia) Bob Shearer

European Tour playoff record (1–0)

No.	Year	Tournament	Opponent	Result
1	1974	Benson & Hedges Festival of Golf	(Australia) Bob Shearer	Won with par on first extra hole

== Results in major championships ==
Tournament	1973	1974	1975	1976	1977	1978	1979
The Open Championship	CUT	CUT	CUT	CUT	CUT		T41

Note: Toussaint only played in The Open Championship.

Did not play

CUT = missed the half-way cut (3rd round cut in 1977 Open Championship)
"T" = tied

== Team appearances ==
Amateur

- Eisenhower Trophy (representing Belgium): 1966, 1970
- St Andrews Trophy (representing the Continent of Europe): 1968, 1970

Professional

- World Cup (representing Belgium): 1971, 1973, 1974, 1975, 1976, 1977, 1978, 1979, 1982, 1987
- Marlboro Nations' Cup/Philip Morris International (representing Belgium): 1973, 1975, 1976
- Hennessy Cognac Cup (representing the Continent of Europe): 1976
- Double Diamond International (representing Continental Europe): 1977
