= 1984 World Cup (men's golf) =

Coordinates: 42.0377°N 12.3661°E

Tournament information
- Dates: 14–18 November
- Location: Rome, Lazio, Italy
- Courses: Olgiata Golf Club; West Course
- Format: 54 holes stroke play combined score

Statistics
- Par: 72
- Length: 6,999 yards (6,400 m)
- Field: 33 two-man teams
- Cut: None
- Prize fund: $150,000
- Winner's share: $60,000 team $25,000 individual

Champion
- Spain; José María Cañizares & José Rivero
- 414 (−18)

Location map
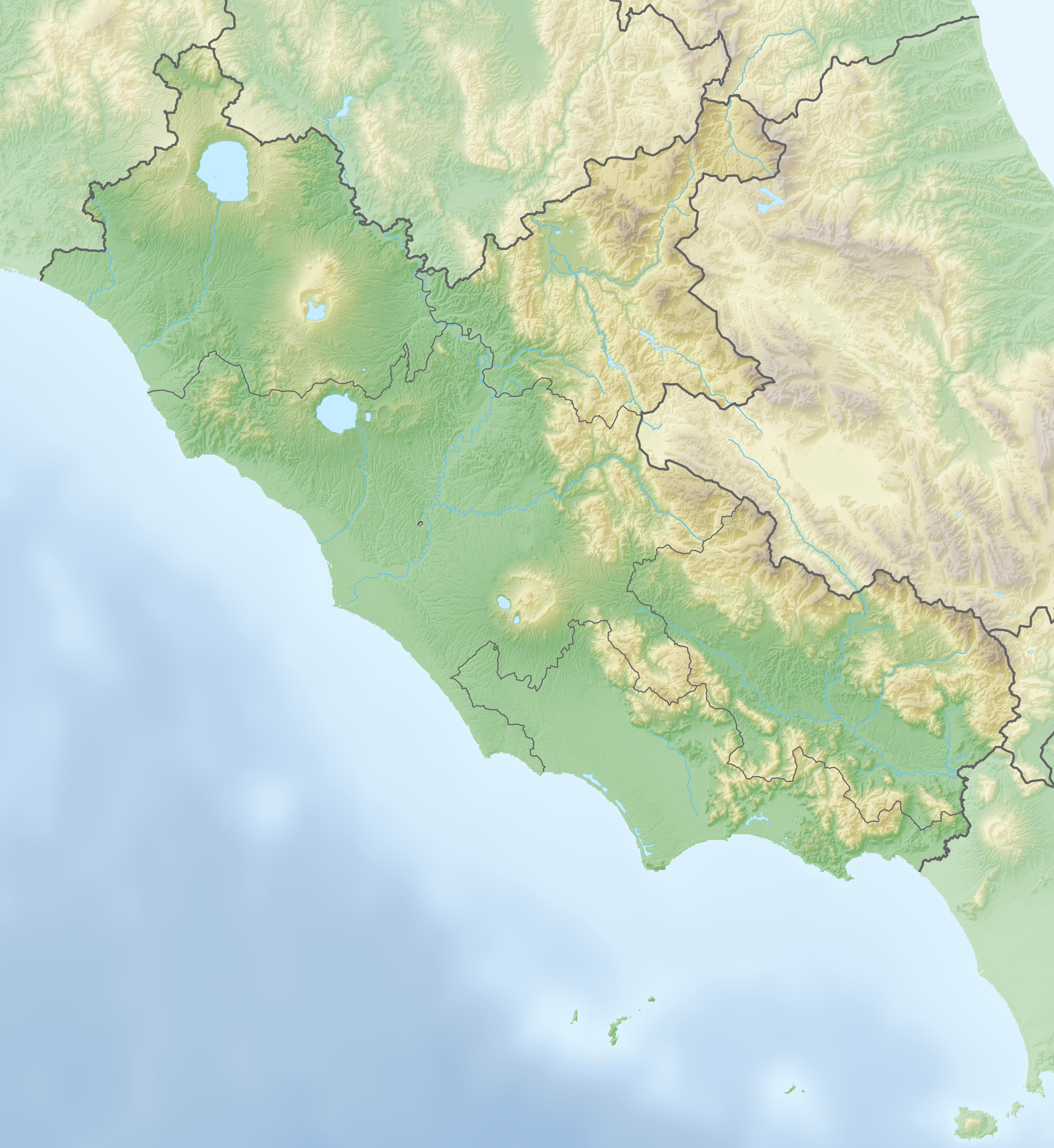
- Location in Italy Location in Lazio

The 1984 World Cup took place 14–18 November at the Olgiata Golf Club, located 15 miles north of Rome, Italy. It was the 31st World Cup event. The tournament was a stroke play team event with 33 teams and was shortened from 72 holes to 54 holes, since the first day of play was cancelled, two hours after it started, due to heavy rain. Each team consisted of two players from a country. The combined score of each team determined the team results. The Spain team of José María Cañizares and José Rivero won by eight strokes over the Taiwan team of Chen Tse-chung and Hsieh Min-nan. It was the fourth Spanish victory in the last eight World Cup tournaments. The individual competition for The International Trophy, was won by Cañizares two strokes ahead of Gordon Brand Jnr, Scotland. Three players also competed as individuals: Roberto De Vicenzo of Argentina, Mohamed Said Moussa of Egypt, and John Jacobs of the United States.

== Teams ==
Country	Players
Argentina	Vicente Fernández and Eduardo Romero
Australia	Mike Harwood and Paul Foley
Austria	Oswald Gartenmaier and Johannes Lamberg
Bermuda	Keith Smith and Kim Swan
Brazil	Priscillo Diniz and Frederico German
Canada	Dave Barr and Jim Rutledge
Colombia	Rigoberto Velásquez and Alberto Rivadeneira
Denmark	Per Greve and Hans Henrik Larsen
England	Howard Clark and Mark James
France	Michel Tapia and Géry Watine
Greece	Bassili Karatzas and John Sotiropoulos
India	Rohtas Singh and Brandon de Souza
Ireland	Eamonn Darcy and Ronan Rafferty
Iceland	Ragnar Ólafsson (a) and Sigurður Petúrsson
Italy	Delio Lovato and Silvano Locatelli
Jamaica	Seymour Rose and Wesley Scott
Japan	Eitaro Deguchi and Namio Takasu
Malaysia	Marimuthu Ramayah and Sahabuddin Yusof
Mexico	Ramon Cruz and Enrique Serna
New Zealand	Richard Coombes and Ian Smalley
Paraguay	Eladio Franco and Angel Jimenez
Philippines	Paterno Braza and Mario Siodina
Scotland	Gordon Brand Jnr and Sam Torrance
Singapore	Lim Swee Wah and Lim Kiang Tiong
South Korea	Lee Myung-ha and Choi Sang-ho
Spain	José María Cañizares and José Rivero
Sweden	Anders Forsbrand and Magnus Persson
Taiwan	Chen Tze-chung and Hsieh Min-Nan
Thailand	Somsak Srisanga and Uthai Thabpavibul
United States	Tom Kite and Lanny Wadkins
Venezuela	Ramón Muñoz and Julian Santana
Wales	Philip Parkin and Ian Woosnam
West Germany	Karl-Heinz Gögele and Torsten Giedeon

== Scores ==
Team

Place	Country	Score	To par	Money (US$) (per team)
1	Spain	139-137-138=414	−18	60,000
T2	Scotland	136-142-144=422	−10	20,000
T2	Taiwan	137-148-137=422	−10	20,000
T4	England	141-143-141=425	−7	3,000
T4	Wales	145-137-143=425	−7	3,000
6	South Korea	138-146-144=428	−4	
7	Italy	140-147-142=429	−3	
8	Ireland	147-143-140=430	−2	
9	Japan	144-142-145=431	−1	
T10	Singapore	147-143-143=433	+1	
T10	Sweden	147-141-145=433	+1	
T12	Argentina	141-145-150=436	+4	
T12	France	149-145-142=436	+4	
T12	United States	145-149-142=436	+4	
T15	Brazil	140-148-149=437	+5	
T15	Colombia	146-142-149=437	+5	
17	Venezuela	145-150-143=438	+6	
18	Canada	150-147-143=440	+8	
19	Philippines	145-147-149=441	+9	
20	Austria	143-151-148=442	+10	
21	Paraguay	150-152-143=445	+13	
T22	Australia	151-151-144=446	+14	
T22	Malaysia	144-154-148=446	+14	
T24	Mexico	147-148-152=447	+15	
T24	Thailand	149-146-152=447	+15	
26	New Zealand	152-150-151=453	+21	
27	India	152-146-159=457	+25	
28	West Germany	149-155-156=460	+28	
29	Iceland	157-151-154=462	+30	
T30	Denmark	158-154-154=466	+34	
T30	Greece	159-150-157=466	+34	
32	Bermuda	158-155-157=470	+38	
33	Jamaica	165-153-155=473	+41	

International Trophy

Place	Player	Country	Score	To par	Money (US$)
1	José María Cañizares	Spain	71-66-68=205	−11	25,000
2	Gordon Brand Jnr	Scotland	67-67-73=207	−9	12,000
T3	José Rivero	Spain	68-71-70=209	−7	3,500
T3	Ian Woosnam	Wales	73-66-70=209	−7	3,500
T5	Chen Tze-chung	Taiwan	69-72-69=210	−6	
T5	Anders Forsbrand	Sweden	70-70-70=210	−6	
7	Lim Swee Wah	Singapore	71-67-73=211	−5	
T8	Howard Clark	England	69-72-71=212	−4	
T8	Hsieh Min-Nan	Taiwan	68-76-68=212	−4	
T8	Lee Myung-ha	South Korea	70-70-72=212	−4	
T8	Delio Lovato	Italy	69-74-69=212	−4	
