= 1966 Canada Cup =

Coordinates: 35.621°N 139.491°E

Tournament information
- Dates: 11–14 November
- Location: Inagi, Tokyo, Japan
- Course: Tokyo Yomiuri Country Club
- Format: 72 holes stroke play combined score

Statistics
- Par: 72
- Length: 6,962 yards (6,366 m)
- Field: 36 two-man teams
- Cut: None
- Prize fund: US$6,300
- Winner's share: $2,000 team $1,000 individual

Champion
- United States; Jack Nicklaus & Arnold Palmer
- 548 (−28)

The 1966 Canada Cup took place 11–14 November at the Tokyo Yomiuri Country Club in Inagi, Tokyo, Japan. It was the 14th Canada Cup event, which became the World Cup in 1967. The tournament was a 72-hole stroke play team event with 36 teams. These were the same teams that had competed in 1965 with the addition of South Korea and Thailand, but without Egypt, Monaco and Morocco. Each team consisted of two players from a country. The combined score of each team determined the team results. The American team of Jack Nicklaus and Arnold Palmer won by five strokes over the South African team of Harold Henning and Gary Player. The individual competition was won by the Canadian George Knudson, who won at the second hole of a sudden-playoff over the Japanese Hideyo Sugimoto.

== Teams ==
Country	Players
Argentina	Roberto De Vicenzo and Leopoldo Ruiz
Australia	Bruce Devlin and Kel Nagle
Austria	Oswald Gertenmaier and Hans Stroll
Belgium	Donald Swaelens and Flory Van Donck
Brazil	José Maria Gonzalez and Igolata Reis
Canada	Frank Fowler and George Knudson
Chile	Francisco Cerda and Alberto Salas
Colombia	Alfonso Bohórquez and Pedro Pablo García
Czechoslovakia	Jiri Dvorak (a) and Jan Kunšta (a)
Denmark	Herluf Hansen and Jorgen Korfitzen
England	Peter Alliss and Tony Jacklin
France	Jean Garaïalde and Jean-Claude Harismendy
West Germany	Herbert Becker and Toni Kugelmüller
Hawaii	Ted Makalena and Paul Scodeller
Ireland	Jimmy Martin and Christy O'Connor Snr
Italy	Roberto Bernardini and Emanuele Canessa
Japan	Mitsutaka Kono and Hideyo Sugimoto
Mexico	José González and Juan Neri
Netherlands	Martin Roesink and André van Pinxten
New Zealand	Frank Buckler and Bob Charles
Peru	Hugo Nari and Bernabé Fajardo
Philippines	Ben Arda and Luis Silverio (a)
Portugal	Fernando Pina and Manuel Ribeiro
Puerto Rico	Juan Gonzalez and Chi-Chi Rodríguez
Scotland	Eric Brown and John Panton
South Africa	Harold Henning and Gary Player
South Korea	Han Chang-sang and Hong Duck-san
Spain	Valentín Barrios and Sebastián Miguel
Sweden	Åke Bergquist and Harry Karlsson-Fakt
Switzerland	Jacky Bonvin and Ronald Tingley
Taiwan	Chen Ching-Po and Lu Liang-Huan
Thailand	Uthai Dabpavibul and Seng Suwankart
United States	Jack Nicklaus and Arnold Palmer
Uruguay	Enrique Fernández and Juan Sereda
Venezuela	Franci Betancourt and Teobaldo Perez
Wales	Sid Mouland and Dave Thomas
West Germany	Herbert Becker and Toni Kugelmüller

== Scores ==
Team

Place	Country	Score	To par	Money (US$)
1	United States	135-135-136-142=548	−28	2,000
2	South Africa	138-138-139-138=553	−23	1,000
3	Taiwan	135-138-143-138=554	−22	800
4	Australia	135-141-137-143=556	−20	400
5	Japan	135-146-136-144=561	−15	
6	Canada	134-144-139-146=563	−13	
7	Argentina	141-143-142-139=565	−11	
8	Belgium	141-141-142-147=571	−5	
9	Spain	149-140-138-145=572	−4	
10	England	144-153-137-140=574	−2	
11	New Zealand	144-152-139-141=576	E	
12	Scotland	143-146-143-146=578	+2	
13	Ireland	144-146-143-148=581	+5	
14	Wales	149-145-147-143=584	+8	
15	Hawaii	147-146-144-148=585	+9	
16	Italy	139-151-149-147=586	+10	
T17	France	142-148-145-153=588	+12	
T17	Mexico	146-146-146-150=588	+12	
19	Netherlands	151-148-143-148=590	+14	
20	West Germany	147-145-153-148=593	+17	
T21	Colombia	144-148-146-156=594	+18	
T21	Philippines	142-152-147-153=594	+18	
23	Chile	140-155-150-151=596	+20	
24	South Korea	150-149-150-150=599	+23	
25	Puerto Rico	148-148-154-152=602	+26	
26	Switzerland	149-151-156-150=606	+30	
27	Thailand	149-152-154-152=607	+31	
28	Brazil	154-155-159-145=613	+37	
29	Denmark	151-149-153-163=616	+40	
30	Sweden	148-157-151-163=619	+43	
31	Venezuela	157-155-155-163=620	+44	
32	Peru	149-161-165-154=629	+53	
T33	Portugal	155-162-156-161=634	+58	
T33	Uruguay	160-163-157-154=634	+58	
35	Austria	165-174-163-160=662	+86	
36	Czechoslovakia	159-163-177-169=668	+92	

International Trophy

Place	Player	Country	Score	To par	Money (US$)
1	George Knudson	Canada	64-68-66-74=272	−16	1,000
2	Hideyo Sugimoto	Japan	66-69-68-69=272	−16	500
T3	Lu Liang-Huan	Taiwan	67-68-73-65=273	−15	300
T3	Jack Nicklaus	United States	69-68-67-69=273	−15	300
5	Arnold Palmer	United States	66-67-69-73=275	−13	
6	Harold Henning	South Africa	69-67-70-70=276	−12	
T7	Bob Charles	New Zealand	69-76-64-68=277	−11	
T7	Bruce Devlin	Australia	69-71-67-70=277	−11	
T7	Gary Player	South Africa	69-71-69-68=277	−11	
10	Roberto De Vicenzo	Argentina	69-69-73-67=278	−10	

Knudson and Sugimoto contested a sudden-death playoff. Knudson won with a birdie 2 at the second extra hole.
