= Hennessy Cognac Cup =

Golf tournament

The Hennessy Cognac Cup was a biennial team golf tournament contested from 1976 to 1984. The contests in 1976, 1978 and 1980 were between teams of professional male golfers; one team representing Great Britain and Ireland, the other team representing Continental Europe. There was also an earlier event, in 1974, played at Sotogrande in Spain, not sponsored by Hennessy. In 1982 a third team, the Rest of the World, was added and the event became a stroke-play contest with an individual prize. The 1984 event was run on a different basis, with 10 national teams competing. The tournament was played in years when there was no Ryder Cup.

The first matches between a team representing Great Britain and Ireland and a team representing Continental Europe were played for the Joy Cup from 1954 to 1958. The concept was restarted with the Seve Trophy in 2000.

== Winners ==
Year	Venue	Winners	Points	Runner-up	Points
Hennessy Cognac Cup
1984 (Note: In 1984 the final stage of the competition was knockout matches, and the score shown is the result of the final.)	Ferndown Golf Club	England	3½	Spain	2½
1982 (Note: The 1982 contest was determined by cumulative stroke-play scores.)	Ferndown Golf Club	Great Britain and Ireland	2166	Rest of the World	2186
1980 (Note: In 1976, 1978 and 1980, 1 point was awarded for a win and ½ for a halved match.)	Sunningdale Golf Club	Great Britain and Ireland	16½	Continent of Europe	13½
1978	The Belfry	Great Britain and Ireland	17½	Continent of Europe	14½
Hennessy Cup
1976	Bondues Golf Club	Great Britain and Ireland	20	Continent of Europe	10
Sotogrande Match
1974 (Note: In 1974 2 points were awarded for a win and 1 for a halved match.)	Royal Sotogrande Golf Club	Great Britain and Ireland	31	Continent of Europe	25

=== Individual ===
Year	Winners	Score	Margin of victory	Runners-up
1982	(England) Mark James	263 (−21)	2 strokes	(Spain) José María Cañizares (England) Nick Faldo

== Event summaries ==
=== 1974 ===
The match was played on 2 and 3 November at Royal Sotogrande Golf Club, Sotogrande, in southern Spain, between the Rest of Europe and Great Britain and Ireland. There were 10 players in each team. There were 4 foursomes matches and 10 singles on both days. All matches were over 18 holes. Two points were awarded for a win and one point for a halved match, so that a total of 56 points were awarded.

The Rest of Europe won the first-day foursomes 5–3 but Great Britain and Ireland won the singles 14–6 to lead 17–11. On the final day Great Britain and Ireland won the foursomes 6–2 to lead 23–13. The Rest of Europe won the afternoon singles 12–8, but Great Britain and Ireland won the match 31–25.

==== Teams ====
The teams were:

- Rest of Europe: Francisco Abreu, Valentín Barrios, Jaime Benito, Roberto Bernardini, José María Cañizares, Jan Dorrestein, Ángel Gallardo, Jean Garaïalde, Manuel Sanchez, Donald Swaelens (captain unknown)
- Great Britain and Ireland: Brian Huggett (captain), Brian Barnes, Neil Coles, Bernard Gallacher, Tommy Horton, Guy Hunt, Christy O'Connor Jnr, Peter Oosterhuis, Eddie Polland, Peter Townsend

=== 1976 ===
The match was played from 17 to 19 September at Bondues Golf Club, Lille, in northern France, between the Continent of Europe and Great Britain and Ireland. There were 11 players in each team. There were 5 foursomes matches on the first day, 5 four-ball matches on the second day with two sessions of 10 singles matches on the final day. All matches were over 18 holes. Each team gained a half-point for matches that were level after 18 holes, so that a total of 30 points were awarded.

The match was level at 2½–2½ after the first day foursomes but Great Britain and Ireland won all five of the four-ball matches to lead 7½–2½ after the second day. On the final day Great Britain and Ireland won the first singles session 6–4 and the second session 6½–3½ to win the match 20–10.

==== Teams ====
The teams were:

- Continent of Europe: Ángel Gallardo (captain), Salvador Balbuena, Seve Ballesteros, José María Cañizares, Baldovino Dassù, Jean Garaïalde, Antonio Garrido, Bernhard Langer, Bernard Pascassio, Manuel Piñero, Philippe Toussaint
- Great Britain and Ireland: Tony Jacklin (captain), Brian Barnes, Peter Butler, Neil Coles, Eamonn Darcy, Martin Foster, Tommy Horton, David Jagger, John O'Leary, Eddie Polland, Sam Torrance

=== 1978 ===
The match was played from 21 to 23 September at The Belfry, between Great Britain and Ireland and the Continent of Europe. There were 11 players in each team. On the first day there were 4 foursomes matches followed by 6 singles. On the second day there were 4 foursomes matches, again followed by 6 singles while there were two sessions of 6 singles matches on the final day. All matches were over 18 holes. Each team gained a half-point for matches that were level after 18 holes, so that a total of 32 points were awarded.

The Continent of Europe led 3–1 after the first day foursomes and increased their lead to 6½–3½ at the end of the day. However Great Britain and Ireland won the second-day foursomes 3½–½ and the singles 4–2 to take an 11–9 lead after two days. On the final day Great Britain and Ireland won the first singles session 4½–1½ and, although the Continent of Europe won the afternoon session 4–2, Great Britain and Ireland won the match 17½–14½.

==== Teams ====
The teams were:

- Great Britain and Ireland: Brian Huggett (captain), Brian Barnes, Ken Brown, Howard Clark, Neil Coles, Nick Faldo, Bernard Gallacher, Mark James, John O'Leary, Eddie Polland, Sam Torrance
- Continent of Europe: Ángel Gallardo (captain), Francisco Abreu, Manuel Ballesteros, Seve Ballesteros, Manuel Calero, José María Cañizares, Patrick Cotton, Baldovino Dassù, Antonio Garrido, Bernhard Langer, Manuel Piñero

=== 1980 ===
The match was played from 12 to 14 September at Sunningdale Golf Club, between Great Britain and Ireland and the Continent of Europe. There were 11 players in each team. On the first day there were 4 fourball matches followed by 6 singles. On the second day there were 4 foursomes matches, again followed by 6 singles while there were 10 singles matches on the final day. All matches were over 18 holes. Each team gained a half-point for matches that were level after 18 holes, so that a total of 30 points were awarded.

Great Britain and Ireland led 2½–1½ after the first day foursomes but the score was level at 5–5 at the end of the day. Great Britain and Ireland won all four foursomes matches on the second day but the Continent of Europe took the singles 4½–1½ so the Great Britain and Ireland only led 10½–9½ after two days. On the final day Great Britain and Ireland won the first five singles matches to take a winning lead. The Continent of Europe won four of the remaining matches so that the final result was a victory for Great Britain and Ireland by 16½–13½. Nick Faldo was the only member of the winning team to play in all five sessions, while five member of the Continent of Europe did so.

==== Teams ====
The teams were:

- Great Britain and Ireland: Brian Barnes (captain), Neil Coles, Nick Faldo, Mark James, Nick Job, Sandy Lyle, Carl Mason, Eddie Polland, Des Smyth, Sam Torrance, Brian Waites
- Continent of Europe: Ángel Gallardo (captain), Francisco Abreu, Manuel Ballesteros, Seve Ballesteros, Manuel Calero, José María Cañizares, Baldovino Dassù, Antonio Garrido, Bernhard Langer, Massimo Mannelli, Manuel Piñero

=== 1982 ===
The tournament was played from 9 to 12 September with three teams, Great Britain and Ireland, the Continent of Europe and a Rest of the World team. The event was played at Ferndown Golf Club in Dorset. There were 10 players in each team who played a round of stroke-play each day. The best 8 rounds on each day were used to determine the team score. Great Britain and Ireland led after the first day with a score of 540, 9 ahead of the Rest of the World. A score of 543 on the second day extended their lead to 12. The Rest of the World reduced the lead to 10 on the third day but Great Britain and Ireland had the best final day and won by 20 strokes. The Continent of Europe finished another 19 strokes behind.

There was a £5,000 prize for the leading player over the 72 holes. This was won by Mark James with a score of 263, two strokes ahead of José María Cañizares and Nick Faldo.

==== Teams ====
The teams were:

- Great Britain and Ireland: Tony Jacklin (captain), Nick Faldo, Bernard Gallacher, Mark James, Sandy Lyle, John O'Leary, Des Smyth, Sam Torrance, Brian Waites, Ian Woosnam
- Continent of Europe: Bernhard Langer (captain), Juan Anglada, Manuel Ballesteros, Manuel Calero, José María Cañizares, Baldovino Dassù, Manuel Garcia, Antonio Garrido, Manuel Montes, Manuel Piñero
- Rest of the World: Greg Norman (captain), Hugh Baiocchi, John Bland, Bob Charles, Vicente Fernández, Jaime Gonzalez, Jeff Hawkes, Tony Johnstone, Mac O'Grady, Vaughan Somers

==== Results table ====
Team	Total
Great Britain and Ireland	2166
Rest of the World	2186
Continent of Europe	2205

==== Individual leaders ====
Player	Team	Total
(England) Mark James	Great Britain and Ireland	263
(Spain) José María Cañizares	Continent of Europe	265
(England) Nick Faldo	Great Britain and Ireland	265
(South Africa) John Bland	Rest of the World	267
(New Zealand) Bob Charles	Rest of the World	270

=== 1984 ===
The tournament was played from 13 to 16 September between 10 teams, the four home nations, five from continental Europe and a Rest of the World team. The event was again played at Ferndown Golf Club in Dorset. There were 4 players in each team who each played a round of stroke-play on each of the first two days. The best three rounds on each day were used to determine the team score. The leading four teams then played semi-finals and a final on the next two days. The semi-finals and final were match-play contests with two fourball matches in the morning and four singles in the afternoon.

There was a £4,000 prize for the leading player after the first two days. This was won by Sandy Lyle with a score of 129, a stroke ahead of Howard Clark.

==== Teams ====
The teams were:

- England: Nick Faldo (captain), Howard Clark, Mark James, Brian Waites
- Scotland: Bernard Gallacher (captain), Ken Brown, Sandy Lyle, Sam Torrance
- Wales: Craig Defoy, David Llewellyn, Philip Parkin, Ian Woosnam
- Ireland: Eamonn Darcy (captain), Christy O'Connor Jnr, Ronan Rafferty, Des Smyth
- France: Jean Garaïalde, Bernard Pascassio, Michel Tapia, Géry Watine
- Italy: Renato Campagnoli, Baldovino Dassù, Massimo Mannelli, Costantino Rocca
- Spain: Manuel Calero, José María Cañizares, Antonio Garrido, José Rivero
- Sweden: Anders Forsbrand, Krister Kinell, Magnus Persson Atlevi, Ove Sellberg
- West Germany: Torsten Giedion, Karl-Heinz Gögele, Manfred Kessler, Carlo Knauss
- Rest of the World: Mike Clayton, David Frost, Jaime Gonzalez, Peter Teravainen

==== Qualifying table ====
Team	Day 1	Day 2	Total
Scotland	193	201	394
England	196	199	395
(Republic of Ireland) Ireland	204	198	402
Spain	199	207	406
France	208	203	411
Wales	203	208	411
Rest of the World	201	215	416
Italy	213	206	419
Sweden	214	205	419
West Germany	215	205	420

==== Knock-out ====
Semifinals
Scotland	1
Spain	5
(Republic of Ireland) Ireland	½
England	5½

Finals
Spain	2½
England	3½
Third place
Scotland	5
(Republic of Ireland) Ireland	1
