= Algarve Open =

Tournament information
- Location: Portimão, Portugal (1972)
- Established: 1969
- Course(s): Penina Golf (1972)
- Month played: March
- Final year: 1972

Final champion
- (Spain) Valentín Barrios

Location in Portugal

The Algarve Open was a men's professional golf tournament played from 1969 to 1972 in the Algarve in Southern Portugal. The 1969 and 1972 events were held at Penina Golf, Portimão. In 1970 it was held at Vilamoura while in 1971 it was held at Vale do Lobo. Total prize money was £5,500 in 1969, £7,000 in 1971 and £6,000 in 1972.

In 1972, neither the Algarve Open nor the Portuguese Open, which was played the following week, counted for the British PGA Order of Merit and as such are not included as part of what has since been officially designated as the first season of the European Tour.

== Winners ==
Year	Winner	Country	Venue	Score	To par	Margin of victory	Runner(s)-up	Winner's share (£)	Ref
1969	Bernard Hunt	England	Penina	292	E	3 strokes	(Scotland) Harry Bannerman (England) John Garner	1,000	
1970	Brian Huggett	Wales	Vilamoura	293	+1	3 strokes	(Scotland) Andrew Brooks		
1971	Ramón Sota	Spain	Vale do Lobo	290	+2	3 strokes	(Scotland) Ronnie Shade	1,000	
1972	Valentín Barrios	Spain	Penina	287	−5	4 strokes	(England) Tommy Horton	1,000	
