= 1974 World Cup (men's golf) =

Coordinates: 10.423°N 66.810°W

Tournament information
- Dates: 21–24 November
- Location: Caracas, Venezuela
- Course: Lagunita Country Club
- Format: 72 holes stroke play combined score

Statistics
- Par: 70
- Length: 6,763 yards (6,184 m)
- Field: 46 two-man teams
- Cut: None
- Prize fund: US$6,300
- Winner's share: $2,000 team $1,000 individual

Champion
- South Africa; Bobby Cole & Dale Hayes
- 554 (−6)

The 1974 World Cup took place 21–24 November at the Lagunita Country Club in Caracas, Venezuela. It was the 22nd World Cup event. The tournament was a 72-hole stroke play team event with 46 teams. Each team consisted of two players from a country. The combined score of each team determined the team results. The South Africa team of Bobby Cole and Dale Hayes won by five strokes over the Japan team of Isao Aoki and Masashi Ozaki. The individual competition for the International Trophy, was won by Cole, five strokes ahead Ozaki.

== Tournament summary ==
According to the Associated Press, the United States team of Lee Trevino and Hale Irwin were the "heavy favorite." In addition, Pat Ward-Thomas of The Guardian noted that "[a]n American victory is probable." However, he also noted that "South Africa remain strong with Dale Hayes... and Bobby Cole." Meanwhile, Ron Coffman of Golf World magazine stated that he thought the South Africans were the favorites.

Indeed, South African won the event, both at the team and individual level. Hayes, just 22 years of age and Cole, being 26, became the youngest pair ever to win the World Cup, formerly named the Canada Cup. It was the second victory for South Africa in the history of the event, since Gary Player and Harold Henning won the tournament for South Africa in 1965.

== Teams ==
Country	Players
Argentina	Fidel de Luca and Roberto De Vicenzo
Australia	Ted Ball and Ian Stanley
Austria	Oswald Gartenmaier and Rudolf Hauser
Belgium	Donald Swaelens and Philippe Toussaint
Brazil	Luis Carlos Pinto and Humberto Rocha
Canada	Wilf Homenuik and Ben Kern
Chile	Francisco Cerda and Natalio Morales
Colombia	Alfonso Bohorquez and Heraclio Valenzuela
Costa Rica	Mario Herrera and Hector Jimenez
Denmark	Per Greve and Herluf Hansen
Egypt	Cherif El-Sayed Cherif and Mohamed Said Moussa
England	Maurice Bembridge and Peter Townsend
France	Roger Demiano and Jean Garaïalde
Greece	John Sotiropoulos and George Vafiadis
Guatemala	Roberto Galindo and Hilario Polo
Hong Kong	Joe Hardwick and Peter Tang
Ireland	Christy O'Connor Jnr and Eddie Polland
Israel	Laurie Been and Neil Shochet
Italy	Roberto Bernardini and Renato Campagnoli
Jamaica	Peter Millhouse and Seymour Rose
Japan	Isao Aoki and Masashi Ozaki
Libya	Hosain Abdul Mola and Muftah Salem
Mexico	Ramon Cruz and Margarito Martinez
Morocco	Assaidi Bouazza and Fatmi Moussa
Netherlands	Jan Dorrestein and Bertus Van Mook
New Zealand	Dennis Clark and Howard Kennedy
Nigeria	Festus Makelemi and Patrick Okpomu
Panama	Leo Dehlinger and Roberto Duran
Peru	Alejandro Malasquez and Sabino Quispe
Philippines	Ireneo Legaspi and Eleuterio Nival
Portugal	Manuel Ribeiro and Joaquim Rodriques
Puerto Rico	Chi-Chi Rodríguez and Jesús Rodríguez
Scotland	Brian Barnes and Bernard Gallacher
Singapore	Lim Kian Tiong and Poh Eng Chong
South Africa	Bobby Cole and Dale Hayes
South Korea	Lee Il-ahn and Park Jung-ung
Spain	José María Cañizares and Manuel Piñero
Sweden	Åke Bergqvist and Sven Tumba
Switzerland	Franco Salmina and Ronald Tingley
Taiwan	Kuo Chie-Hsiung and Lu Liang-Huan
Thailand	Seng Suwannakat and Uthai Thappavibul
Trinidad and Tobago	Peter Latchmansingh and Lennox Yearwood
United States	Hale Irwin and Lee Trevino
Venezuela	Noel Machado and Ramón Muñoz
Wales	Craig Defoy and David Llewellyn
West Germany	Toni Kugelmuller and Siegfried Vollrath

== Scores ==
Team

Place	Country	Score	To par	Money (US$)
1	South Africa	137-138-139-140=554	−6	2,000
2	Japan	137-138-140-144=559	−1	1,000
3	United States	143-141-138-141=563	+3	800
4	Taiwan	143-141-143-139=566	+6	400
5	Ireland	143-148-138-143=572	+12	
6	Spain	145-144-144-142=575	+15	
7	Venezuela	140-144-146-147=577	+17	
T8	Argentina	146-147-142-144=579	+19	
T8	Scotland	140-142-147-150=579	+19	
10	England	137-149-146-148=580	+20	
11	Puerto Rico	141-150-143-147=581	+21	
12	Canada	147-141-148-149=585	+25	
13	Belgium	146-144-152-145=587	+27	
T14	Chile	149-147-143-150=589	+29	
T14	Mexico	147-148-145-149=589	+29	
16	Wales	145-150-151-147=593	+33	
T17	Austria	151-144-152-147=594	+34	
T17	Colombia	151-146-148-149=594	+34	
19	Netherlands	142-149-153-153=597	+37	
20	Trinidad and Tobago	150-147-156-147=600	+40	
21	South Korea	148-149-153-151=601	+41	
22	Italy	153-147-152-152=604	+44	
23	New Zealand	155-149-155-146=605	+45	
24	France	147-147-154-160=608	+48	
25	Thailand	155-151-151-152=609	+49	
T26	Greece	151-154-152-155=612	+52	
T26	Philippines	146-155-151-160=612	+52	
28	Jamaica	153-159-149-156=617	+57	
29	Denmark	156-148-158-156=618	+58	
30	Panama	147-150-157-168=622	+62	
T31	Guatemala	151-161-154-157=623	+63	
T31	Sweden	159-154-156-154=623	+63	
33	West Germany	158-160-156-152=626	+66	
34	Egypt	157-156-159-157=629	+69	
35	Brazil	153-158-158-161=630	+70	
36	Costa Rica	160-158-164-151=633	+73	
37	Singapore	160-165-155-154=634	+74	
38	Peru	163-159-156-157=635	+75	
39	Switzerland	153-157-168-159=637	+77	
40	Hong Kong	164-153-162-160=639	+79	
T41	Morocco	164-151-161-165=641	+81	
T41	Portugal	164-156-166-155=641	+81	
43	Nigeria	161-168-166-160=655	+95	
44	Israel	161-157-169-181=668	+108	
45	Libya	171-185-173-169=698	+138	
WD	Australia	151-145-WD		

International Trophy

Place	Player	Country	Score	To par	Money (US$)
1	Bobby Cole	South Africa	66-70-67-68=271	−9	1,000
2	Masashi Ozaki	Japan	67-68-70-71=276	−4	500
3	Hale Irwin	United States	73-69-68-68=278	−2	400
T4	Isao Aoki	Japan	70-70-70-73=283	+3	
T4	Dale Hayes	South Africa	71-68-72-72=283	+3	
T4	Kuo Chie-Hsiung	Taiwan	71-71-73-68=283	+3	
T4	Lu Liang-Huan	Taiwan	72-70-70-71=283	+3	
8	Roberto De Vicenzo	Argentina	71-71-69-73=284	+4	
T9	Chi-Chi Rodríguez	Puerto Rico	70-74-67-74=285	+5	
T9	Lee Trevino	United States	70-72-70-73=285	+5	
