= 1971 World Cup (men's golf) =

Coordinates: 26.832°N 80.117°W

Tournament information
- Dates: November 11–14
- Location: Palm Beach Gardens, Florida, U.S.
- Courses: PGA National Golf Club; East Course (now BallenIsles Country Club)
- Format: 72 holes stroke play combined score

Statistics
- Par: 72
- Length: 7,096 yards (6,489 m)
- Field: 46 two-man teams
- Cut: None
- Prize fund: US$6,300
- Winner's share: $2,000 team $1,000 individual

Champion
- United States; Jack Nicklaus & Lee Trevino
- 555 (−21)

The 1971 World Cup took place November 11–14 at PGA National Golf Club (now BallenIsles Country Club, East Course) in Palm Beach Gardens, Florida. It was the 19th World Cup event. The tournament was a 72-hole stroke play team event with 46 teams, which was a record high number of participants. Each team consisted of two players from a country. The combined score of each team determined the team results. The United States team of Jack Nicklaus and Lee Trevino won by eight strokes over the South Africa team of Harold Henning and Gary Player. The individual competition was won by Nicklaus seven strokes ahead of Player. This was the 11th team victory for the United States in the history of the World Cup, founded in 1953 and until 1967 named the Canada Cup.

== Teams ==
Country	Players
Argentina	Roberto De Vicenzo and Florentino Molina
Australia	Bruce Devlin and David Graham
Austria	Oswald Gartenmaier and Rudolf Hauser
Belgium	Donald Swaelens and Philippe Toussaint
Brazil	Mário Gonzalez and Luis Carlos Pinto
Canada	Wilf Homenuik and Moe Norman
Chile	Francisco Cerda and Rafael Jerez
Colombia	Rogelio Gonzales and Heraclio Valenzuela
Czechoslovakia	Jiri Dvorak (a) and Jan Kunšta (a)
Denmark	Herluf Hansen and Henrik Lund
Dominican Republic	Edwin Corrie (a) and Carlos Puebla (a)
Egypt	Cherif El-Sayed Cherif and Mohamed Said Moussa
England	Tony Jacklin and Peter Oosterhuis
France	Jean Garaïalde and Bernard Pascassio
Greece	John Sotiropoulos and Stefano Vafiadis (a)
Ireland	Hugh Jackson and Christy O'Connor Snr
Italy	Roberto Bernardini and Ettore Della Torre
Jamaica	Alvin Cunningham and Seymour Rose
Japan	Takaaki Kono and Haruo Yasuda
Libya	Muftah Salem and Hussein Abdulmullah
Mexico	Sixto Torres and Margarito Martinez
Morocco	Omar Ben El-Harcha and Benrokia Massaoud
Netherlands	Jan Dorrestein and Bertus Van Mook
New Zealand	Bob Charles and John Lister
Nigeria	Jamiu Oyebajo and Patrick Okpomu
Panama	Leo Dehlinger and Grover Matheney
Peru	Bernabé Fajardo and David Montoya
Philippines	Ben Arda and Eleuterio Nival
Portugal	Henrique Paulino and Joaquim Rodrigues
Puerto Rico	Chi-Chi Rodríguez and Manuel Camacho
Rhodesia	Leon Evans and Donald Gammon
Romania	Dumitru Muntanu (a) and Paul Tomita
Scotland	Bernard Gallacher and Ronnie Shade
Singapore	Phua Thin Kiay and Alvin Liau
South Africa	Harold Henning and Gary Player
South Korea	Hahn Sang-chan and Kim Seung-hack
Spain	Ángel Gallardo and Ramón Sota
Sweden	Åke Bergquist and Jonas Peil
Switzerland	Bernard Cordonier and Denis Maina
Taiwan	Lu Liang-Huan and Hsieh Min-Nan
Thailand	Prodana Ngarmprom and Sukree Onsham
United States	Jack Nicklaus and Lee Trevino
Uruguay	Carlos Cereda and Enrique Fernandez
Venezuela	Ramón Muñoz and Enrique Zurlta
Wales	Craig Defoy and Brian Huggett
West Germany	Roman Krause and Toni Kugelmuller

(a) denotes amateur

== Scores ==
Team

Place	Country	Score	To par	Money (US$) (per team)
1	United States	143-138-134-140=555	−21	2,000
2	South Africa	140-138-143-146=567	−9	1,000
3	New Zealand	143-143-141-142=569	−7	800
4	Argentina	145-145-141-144=575	−1	200
5	South Korea	151-142-144-144=581	+5	
T6	England	144-142-147-149=582	+6	
T6	Philippines	150-143-146-143=582	+6	
8	Canada	146-144-144-149=583	+7	
9	Wales	147-148-149-141=585	+9	
10	Taiwan	145-146-145-150=586	+10	
T11	Australia	150-142-144-151=587	+11	
T11	Japan	149-145-147-146=587	+11	
13	Spain	149-148-147-148=592	+16	
14	Scotland	147-144-150-154=595	+19	
15	Thailand	150-148-150-150=598	+22	
16	Italy	148-150-149-154=601	+25	
17	Colombia	150-154-144-154=602	+26	
18	Netherlands	150-148-150-156=604	+28	
19	Ireland	155-147-158-147=607	+31	
20	France	156-156-147-152=611	+35	
T21	Mexico	156-149-157-162=614	+38	
T21	Puerto Rico	151-155-159-149=614	+38	
T21	Rhodesia	151-153-156-154=614	+38	
T24	Brazil	160-150-155-152=617	+41	
T24	West Germany	154-149-156-158=617	+41	
26	Egypt	157-159-152-154=622	+46	
27	Chile	155-152-157-159=623	+47	
28	Belgium	156-155-153-160=624	+48	
29	Denmark	162-153-155-157=627	+51	
30	Panama	163-157-155-157=632	+56	
31	Dominican Republic	160-154-161-159=634	+58	
T32	Austria	156-162-167-160=645	+69	
T32	Venezuela	171-158-158-159=645	+69	
34	Portugal	161-163-165-158=647	+71	
35	Sweden	157-155-160-166=648	+72	
36	Uruguay	172-159-160-159=650	+74	
T37	Jamaica	168-160-164-162=654	+78	
T37	Peru	167-162-163-162=654	+78	
39	Greece	169-165-163-161=658	+82	
40	Morocco	168-160-162-169=659	+83	
41	Switzerland	167-160-166-169=662	+86	
42	Nigeria	170-160-167-172=669	+93	
43	Libya	171-169-167-170=677	+101	
44	Czechoslovakia	173-166-177-171=687	+111	
45	Romania	192-181-176-187=736	+160	
DQ	Singapore	DQ-166-178-172		

The Singapore team was disqualified when Phua Thin Kiay could not play the first round due to tonsillitis. He played the remaining rounds and his teammate, Alvin Liau played all four rounds.

International Trophy

Place	Player	Country	Score	To par	Money (US$)
1	Jack Nicklaus	United States	68-69-63-71=271	−17	1,000
2	Gary Player	South Africa	69-67-71-71=278	−10	500
3	Roberto De Vicenzo	Argentina	69-70-71-71=281	−7	400
4	John Lister	New Zealand	72-74-68-68=282	−6	200
5	Lee Trevino	United States	75-69-71-69=284	−4	
T6	Brian Huggett	Wales	75-69-73-68=285	−3	
T6	Lu Liang-Huan	Taiwan	71-69-73-72=285	−3	
T8	Bob Charles	New Zealand	71-69-73-74=287	−1	
T8	David Graham	Australia	73-70-71-73=287	−1	
T10	Harold Henning	South Africa	71-71-72-75=289	+1	
T10	Ronnie Shade	Scotland	70-72-72-75=289	+1	
