= Roberto Bernardini =

Italian professional golfer

Personal information
- Nationality: Italy
- Born: 21 January 1944 (age 82) Rome, Italy
- Height: 1.76 m (5 ft 9 in)
- Weight: 90 kg (200 lb; 14 st)

Career
- Sport: Golf
- Turned professional: 1961
- Former tours: European Tour; European Seniors Tour
- Professional wins: 19

Best results in major championships
- Masters Tournament: T29: 1969
- PGA Championship: DNP
- U.S. Open: DNP
- The Open Championship: T13: 1972

Roberto Bernardini (born 21 January 1944) is an Italian professional golfer. He represented Italy 9 times in the World Cup between 1966 and 1975.

Most of his success came in continental Europe as he won a number of tournaments in his native Italy. He also won the Swiss Open in back-to-back years, 1968 and 1969. Late in 1969, he won the Agfa-Gevaert Tournament, an international tournament played in West Germany. He scored 281, defeating South Africa's Graham Henning by a stroke. It was his fourth win on the European circuit that year. This excellent play helped Bernardini qualify for the Masters Tournament in 1969 and 1970.

Bernardini had some success outside continental Europe, however. He reached the semi-final of the 1970 Long John Scotch Whisky Match Play Championship and finished joint third in the 1972 Sunbeam Electric Scottish Open. He also made a number of appearances in the Open Championship between 1966 and 1980 with best finishes of tied for 17th in 1970 and tied for 13th in 1972.

After reaching 50, Bernardini played on the European Seniors Tour, his best finish being runner-up in the 1996 Hippo Jersey Seniors.

== Professional wins (19) ==
- 1966 Lancia d'Oro
- 1967 Italian Native Open, Lancia d'Oro
- 1968 Italian BP Open, Swiss Open, Italian Native Open, Agfa-Gevaert Tournament
- 1969 Walworth Aloyco Tournament, Swiss Open, Lancia d'Oro, Agfa-Gevaert Tournament
- 1971 Italian BP Open
- 1972 Shell Open di Alassio
- 1973 Italian Native Open
- 1975 Italian Native Open, Memorial Olivier Barras
- 1977 Italian PGA Championship
- 1979 Memorial Olivier Barras

== Results in major championships ==
Tournament	1966	1967	1968	1969	1970	1971	1972	1973	1974	1975	1976	1977	1978	1979	1980
Masters Tournament				T29	CUT										
The Open Championship	T37	T36	CUT		T17	CUT	T13	CUT		CUT		CUT			CUT

Note: Bernardini never played in the U.S. Open or PGA Championship.

Did not play

CUT = missed the half-way cut (3rd round cut in 1968, 1971 and 1975 Open Championships)
"T" indicates a tie for a place

== Team appearances ==
- World Cup (representing Italy): 1966, 1967, 1968, 1969, 1971, 1972, 1973, 1974, 1975
- Marlboro Nations' Cup/Philip Morris International (representing Italy): 1972, 1973, 1975, 1976
- Double Diamond International (representing Continental Europe): 1972
- Hennessy Cognac Cup (representing the Continent of Europe): 1974

== See also ==
- 1970 PGA Tour Qualifying School graduates
