= Agfa-Gevaert Tournament (Germany) =

Tournament information
- Location: Munich, West Germany
- Established: 1968
- Course(s): Munich Golf Club
- Par: 72
- Format: Stroke play
- Month played: August
- Final year: 1971

Tournament record score
- Aggregate: 278 Gary Robinson (1970); 278 Donald Swaelens (1970)

Final champion
- (Belgium) Donald Swaelens

The Agfa-Gevaert Tournament was a professional golf tournament that was played in Munich, West Germany from 1968 to 1971. It was founded by sponsors Agfa-Gevaert following the success of their British subsidiary's existing tournament in England, and was the last of three tournaments in West Germany played in consecutive weeks, following on from the German Open and the Woodlawn International Invitational. It was hosted at Munich Golf Club.

== Winners ==
Year	Winner	Country	Score	Margin of victory	Runner(s)-up	Country	Ref
1971	Donald Swaelens	Belgium	281 (−7)	1 stroke	Roberto Bernardini	Italy	
1970	Gary Robinson	United States	278 (−10)	Playoff (Note: Robinson won with a birdie on the first hole of a sudden-death playoff.)	Donald Swaelens	Belgium	
1969	Roberto Bernardini	Italy	281 (−7)	1 stroke	Graham Henning	South Africa	
1968	Roberto Bernardini	Italy	281 (−7)	1 stroke	Barry Franklin	South Africa	
