= Ángel Gallardo (golfer) =

Spanish professional golfer

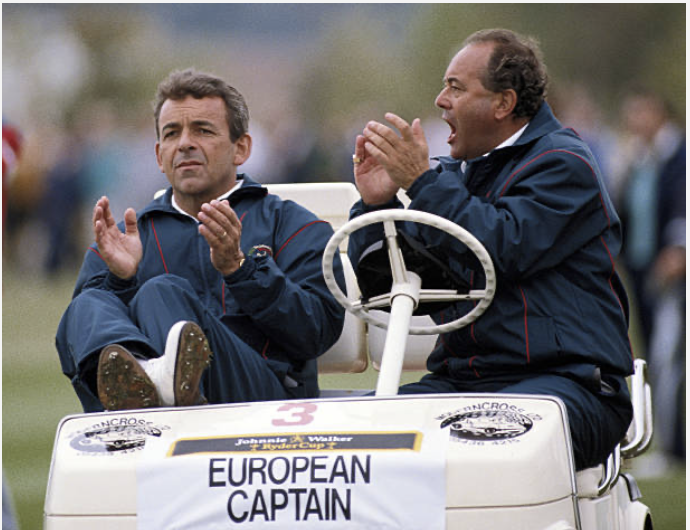
- Gallardo (right) as a Ryder Cup captain's assistant

Personal information
- Full name: Ángel Gallardo
- Nationality: Spain
- Born: 29 July 1943 (age 83) Sitges, Barcelona, Spain

Career
- Sport: Golf
- Turned professional: 1962
- Former tour: European Tour
- Professional wins: 7

Number of wins by tour
- European Tour: 1
- Other: 6

Best results in major championships
- Masters Tournament: DNP
- PGA Championship: DNP
- U.S. Open: DNP
- The Open Championship: T24: 1974

Ángel Gallardo (born 29 July 1943) is a Spanish professional golfer.

== Career ==
Gallardo was a member of the European Tour from its first official season in 1972 until 1982. He finished in the top one hundred of the European Tour Order of Merit in each of those eleven seasons, with a best ranking of tenth in 1977. His only official European Tour win was the 1977 Italian Open however he did win the 1967 Portuguese Open and the 1970 Spanish Open, events that would soon be enfolded into the European Tour schedule. He also won the 1971 Mexican Open.

He was the second non-British golfer to be elected as Captain of the PGA of Great Britain and Ireland in 1982.

Since leaving the tour, Gallardo has worked as a coach and as a golf course architect, with work that has included co-designing the PGA Golf de Catalunya, venue for the Open de España in 2009. He was vice-chairman of the PGA European Tour from 1995 to 2019 and is now Ambassador of the PGA European Tour.

== Professional wins (7) ==
=== European Tour wins (1) ===
No.	Date	Tournament	Winning score	Margin of victory	Runner-up
1	1 May 1977	Italian Open	−2 (71-69-72-74=286)	Playoff	(Scotland) Brian Barnes

European Tour playoff record (1–1)

No.	Year	Tournament	Opponent(s)	Result
1	1977	Italian Open	(Scotland) Brian Barnes	Won with birdie on fourth extra hole
2	1977	Callers of Newcastle	(England) Peter Butler, (South Africa) John Fourie, (England) Tommy Horton	Fourie won with par on second extra hole Butler and Horton eliminated by par on first hole

=== Other wins (6) ===
- 1967 Portuguese Open
- 1969 Sumrie Better-Ball (with Maurice Bembridge)
- 1970 Spanish Open
- 1971 Mexican Open
- 1973 Memorial Olivier Barras, Copa Raleigh

== Results in major championships ==
Tournament	1968	1969	1970	1971	1972	1973	1974	1975	1976	1977	1978	1979	1980
The Open Championship	CUT	T42		CUT	CUT		T24	CUT		T26	CUT		CUT

Note: Gallardo only played in The Open Championship.

Did not play

CUT = missed the half-way cut (3rd round cut in 1980 Open Championship)
"T" = tied

== Team appearances ==
- World Cup (representing Spain): 1969, 1970, 1971, 1972, 1973, 1975
- Double Diamond International (representing Continental Europe): 1972, 1974, 1977 (captain)
- Marlboro Nations' Cup (representing Spain): 1972 (winners), 1973
- Sotogrande Match/Hennessy Cognac Cup (representing the Continent of Europe): 1974, 1976 (captain), 1978 (captain), 1980 (captain)
