= Philip Morris International (golf) =

Golf tournament

The Philip Morris International was a professional team golf tournament, played from 1972 and 1976. The 1972 and 1973 tournaments were called the Marlboro Nations' Cup. There was no tournament in 1974 but the event was played in 1975 and 1976 under a different name. All events were played in France. The tournament had a knock-out format with up to 16 teams competing. There were two players in each team, each match consisting of a foursomes followed by two singles matches.

The 1972 event was played at Mandelieu-la-Napoule near Cannes, the 1973 and 1975 events were played at Hardelot near Boulogne in northern France. In 1976 it was played at Divonne-les-Bains on the Swiss border near Geneva.

In 1972 and 1973 all the team were European, with the exception of Morocco who competed in 1972. Australia and South Africa competed in 1975 and they were joined by the United States, Argentina and New Zealand in 1976.

== Winners ==
Year	Venue	Winners	Points	Runner-up	Points
Philip Morris International
1976	Divonne Golf Club	United States	2½	Scotland	½
1975	Hardelot Golf Club	France	2	South Africa	1
1974	No tournament				
Marlboro Nations' Cup
1973	Hardelot Golf Club	Scotland	2	France	1
1972	Cannes-Mandelieu Golf Club	Spain	2	Wales	1

== 1972 ==
=== Teams ===
Country	Players
Austria	Hansi Egger and Oswald Gartenmaier
Belgium	Donald Swaelens and Flory Van Donck
Denmark	Herluf Hansen and Henning Kristensen
England	Tony Jacklin and Peter Townsend
France	Jean Garaïalde and Bernard Pascassio
Ireland	Jimmy Kinsella and John O'Leary
Italy	Roberto Bernardini and Baldovino Dassù
Morocco	B H Aomar and B R Messaoud
Netherlands	Jan Dorrestein and Simon van den Berg
Portugal	Henrique Paulino and J Rodrigues
Scotland	Brian Barnes and Harry Bannerman
Spain	Valentín Barrios and Ángel Gallardo
Sweden	B Johannson and J Rosell
Switzerland	R Barras and Ronald Tingley
Wales	Brian Huggett and David Vaughan

=== Results ===
Last 16
Spain	3
Switzerland	0
France	2
Netherlands	1
Ireland	2
Portugal	1
Scotland	3
Austria	0
Wales	3
Morocco	0
Italy	3
Sweden	0
Belgium	2½
Denmark	½
England
Bye

Quarter-finals
Spain	2
France	1
Ireland	½
Scotland	2½
Wales	2½
Italy	½
Belgium	0
England	3

Semi-finals
Spain	2½
Scotland	½
Wales	2
England	1

Final
Spain	2
Wales	1

== 1973 ==
=== Teams ===
Country	Players
Austria	Hansi Egger and Oswald Gartenmaier
Belgium	Donald Swaelens and Philippe Toussaint
Denmark	Per Greve and Herluf Hansen
England	Neil Coles and Tony Jacklin
France	Jean Garaïalde and Bernard Pascassio
Ireland	John O'Leary and Eddie Polland
Italy	Roberto Bernardini and Alberto Croce
Netherlands	Jan Dorrestein and Simon van den Berg
Scotland	Brian Barnes and Bernard Gallacher
Spain	Valentín Barrios and Ángel Gallardo
Sweden	Thure Holmstrom and Jan Rosell
Switzerland	B Cordonnier and Ronald Tingley
Wales	Brian Huggett and David Vaughan
West Germany	Gerhard Koenig and Toni Kugelmüller

=== Results ===
Last 16
Wales
Bye
France	3
Switzerland	0
Italy	2½
Netherlands	½
England	3
Denmark	0
Scotland	2½
Sweden	½
Ireland	2
West Germany	1
Belgium	2
Austria	1
Spain
Bye

Quarter-finals
Wales	1
France	2
Italy	1
England	2
Scotland	2
Ireland	1
Belgium	1
Spain	2

Semi-finals
France	2
England	1
Scotland	2
Spain	1

Final
France	1
Scotland	2

== 1975 ==
=== Teams ===
Country	Players
Australia	Jack Newton and Bob Shearer
Belgium	Philippe Toussaint and Flory Van Donck
Denmark	Per Greve and Herluf Hansen
England	Neil Coles and Peter Townsend
France	Jean Garaïalde and Bernard Pascassio
Ireland	Christy O'Connor Jnr and John O'Leary
Italy	Roberto Bernardini and Alberto Croce
Netherlands	Hans Lemmens and Simon van den Berg
Portugal	Antonio Barnabe and Domingos Silva
Scotland	Andrew Brooks and David Chillas
South Africa	Hugh Baiocchi and John Fourie
Spain	José María Cañizares and Manuel Piñero
Sweden	Thure Holmstrom and Gunnar Mueller
Switzerland	Franco Salmina and Ronald Tingley
Wales	Craig Defoy and David Llewellyn
West Germany	Withdrew

=== Results ===
Last 16
England	3
Portugal	0
Italy	3
Switzerland	0
Spain	2
Wales	1
South Africa	2
Denmark	1
France	w/o
West Germany	w/d
Ireland	2
Sweden	1
Australia	2
Netherlands	1
Belgium	2
Scotland	1

Quarter-finals
England	2
Italy	1
Spain	1
South Africa	2
France	2
Ireland	1
Australia	3
Belgium	0

Semi-finals
England	1
South Africa	2
France	2
Australia	1

Final
South Africa	1
France	2

== 1976 ==
=== Teams ===
Country	Players
Argentina	Not known
Austria	German Egger and Hansi Egger
Australia	David Graham and Bob Shearer
Belgium	Not known
England	Maurice Bembridge and Peter Butler
France	Jean Garaïalde and Bernard Pascassio
Ireland	Eamonn Darcy and Christy O'Connor Jnr
Italy	Roberto Bernardini and Baldovino Dassù
Netherlands	Martin Groenendaal and Hans Lemmens
New Zealand	Bob Charles and Simon Owen
Scotland	Brian Barnes and Bernard Gallacher
South Africa	Bobby Cole and Dale Hayes
Spain	Salvador Balbuena and Antonio Garrido
Switzerland	Franco Salmina and Fausto Shiroli
United States	Tommy Aaron and Barry Jaeckel
West Germany	Karl-Heinz Gögele and Jürgen Harder

=== Results ===
Last 16
South Africa	3
Switzerland	0
Ireland	2
New Zealand	1
England	2
Spain	1
Scotland	3
Netherlands	0
West Germany	2
Argentina	1
Australia	3
Italy	0
United States	2
Belgium	1
France	3
Austria	0

Quarter-finals
South Africa	2
Ireland	1
England	1
Scotland	2
West Germany	½
Australia	2½
United States	2
France	1

Semi-finals
South Africa	½
Scotland	2½
Australia	1
United States	2

Final
Scotland	½
United States	2½
