= 1972 World Cup (men's golf) =

Coordinates: 37.969°S 145.028°E

Tournament information
- Dates: 9–12 November
- Location: Melbourne, Australia
- Courses: Royal Melbourne Golf Club (Composite of East and West Courses)
- Format: 54 holes stroke play combined score

Statistics
- Par: 71
- Length: 6,944 yards (6,350 m)
- Field: 43 two-man teams
- Cut: None
- Prize fund: US$6,300
- Winner's share: $2,000 team $1,000 individual

Champion
- Republic of China; Hsieh Min-Nan & Lu Liang-Huan
- 438 (+12)
- Location in Australia Location in Victoria

The 1972 World Cup took place 9–12 November at Royal Melbourne Golf Club in Melbourne, Australia. It was the 20th World Cup event. The tournament was a stroke play team event, shortened from 72 holes, after the second round, scheduled on Friday, was cancelled due to bad weather, to 54 holes with 43 teams. Each team consisted of two players from a country. The combined score of each team determined the team results. The Republic of China team of Hsieh Min-Nan and Lu Liang-Huan won by two strokes over the Japan team of Takaaki Kono and Takashi Murakami. The individual competition was won by Hsieh two strokes ahead of Kono. This was the first team victory for the Republic of China, also known as Taiwan, in the history of the World Cup, founded in 1953 and until 1967 named the Canada Cup.

== Teams ==
Country	Players
Argentina	Roberto De Vicenzo and Vicente Fernández
Australia	Bruce Crampton and Bill Dunk
Austria	Oswald Gartenmaier and Rudolf Hauser
Belgium	Donald Swaelens and Flory Van Donck
Brazil	Jose Maria Gonzalez Jr and Luis Carlos Pinto
Canada	Phil Giroux and Bob Panasik
Chile	Francisco Cerda and Rafael Jerez
Colombia	Alfonso Bohórquez and Juan Pinzon
Denmark	Herluf Hansen and Henning Kristensen
Egypt	Farouk Badr and Mohamed Said Moussa
England	Guy Hunt and Tony Jacklin
France	Jean Garaïalde and Bernard Pascassio
Greece	John Sotiropoulos and George Vafiadis (a)
Hong Kong	Joe Hardwick and Peter Tang
Indonesia	Salim Denim and Soeparno
Ireland	Jimmy Kinsella and John O'Leary
Italy	Roberto Bernardini and Alberto Croce
Jamaica	Peter Millhouse and Seymore Rose
Japan	Takaaki Kono and Takashi Murakami
Libya	Mohammed Salah Ziaani and Muftah Salem
Malaysia	Zainal Abidin Yusof and Bobby Lim Yat Foong
Mexico	Ramón Cruz and Victor Regalado
Morocco	Omar Ben El-Harcha and Benrokia Massaoud
Netherlands	Jan Dorrestein and Bertus Van Mook
New Zealand	Bob Charles and Walter Godfrey
Nigeria	Patrick Okpomu and Paul Osanebi
Peru	Bernabé Fajardo and Raul Travieso
Philippines	Ben Arda and Ireneo Legaspi
Portugal	Henrique Paulino and Joaquin Rodrigues
Puerto Rico	David Jimenez and Dan Murphy
Republic of China	Lu Liang-Huan and Hsieh Min-Nan
Romania	Dumitru Muneanu (a) and Paul Tomita
Scotland	Harry Bannerman and Ronnie Shade
Singapore	David Milne and Phua Thin Kiay
South Africa	Tienie Britz and Gary Player
South Korea	Hahn Sang-chan and Kim Seung-hack
Spain	Valentín Barrios and Ángel Gallardo
Sweden	Eric Ericsson and Jonas Peil
Switzerland	Bernard Cordonier and Ronald Tingley
Thailand	Sukree Onsham and Long Toyai
United States	Jim Jamieson and Tom Weiskopf
Wales	Kim Dabson and David Vaughan
West Germany	Roman Krause and Gerhard König

(a) denotes amateur

== Scores ==
Team

Place	Country	Score	To par	Money (US$) (per team)
1	Republic of China	144-141-153=438	+12	2,000
2	Japan	141-145-154=440	+14	1,000
3	South Africa	149-144-151=444	+18	800
T4	Australia	148-148-149=445	+19	100
T4	United States	150-142-153=445	+19	100
6	England	151-153-145=449	+23	
T7	Belgium	144-150-158=452	+26	
T7	South Korea	146-148-158=452	+26	
9	Argentina	151-145-157=453	+27	
T10	Italy	148-156-152=456	+30	
T10	New Zealand	148-153-155=456	+30	
T12	Ireland	164-146-152=462	+36	
T12	Spain	153-156-153=462	+36	
T14	Netherlands	153-149-151=463	+37	
T14	Thailand	151-154-158=463	+37	
16	France	152-152-160=464	+38	
T17	Canada	148-150-168=466	+40	
T17	Philippines	154-153-159=466	+40	
T17	Scotland	158-154-154=466	+40	
T17	West Germany	156-153-157=466	+40	
21	Mexico	157-152-159=468	+42	
T22	Colombia	154-154-161=469	+43	
T22	Puerto Rico	159-154-156=469	+43	
24	Egypt	158-152-160=470	+44	
T25	Denmark	155-155-166=476	+50	
T25	Wales	155-158-163=476	+50	
27	Chile	160-161-156=477	+51	
28	Brazil	155-156-167=478	+52	
29	Peru	162-158-161=481	+55	
30	Hong Kong	159-162-161=482	+56	
T31	Austria	159-162-166=487	+61	
T31	Switzerland	156-165-166=487	+61	
33	Sweden	159-170-162=491	+65	
T34	Greece	160-165-167=492	+66	
T34	Malaysia	165-159-168=492	+66	
T36	Jamaica	167-166-164=497	+71	
T36	Singapore	168-166-163=497	+71	
38	Indonesia	170-167-165=502	+76	
39	Morocco	167-168-174=509	+83	
40	Portugal	168-167-175=510	+84	
41	Nigeria	167-164-182=513	+87	
42	Libya	181-174-179=534	+108	
43	Romania	185-188-182=555	+129	

International Trophy

Place	Player	Country	Score	To par	Money (US$)
1	Hsieh Min-Nan	Republic of China	70-69-78=217	+4	1,000
2	Takaaki Kono	Japan	71-72-76=219	+6	500
3	Tienie Britz	South Africa	73-72-75=220	+7	400
T4	Bruce Crampton	Australia	73-70-78=221	+8	67
T4	Lu Liang-Huan	Taiwan	74-72-75=221	+8	67
T4	Takashi Murakami	Japan	70-73-78=221	+8	67
T7	Jim Jamieson	United States	73-73-76=222	+9	
T7	Sukree Onsham	Thailand	71-77-74=222	+9	
T7	Donald Swaelens	Belgium	70-74-78=222	+9	
T10	Roberto De Vicenzo	Argentina	75-69-79=223	+10	
T10	Guy Hunt	England	74-76-73=223	+10	
T10	Tom Weiskopf	United States	77-69-77=223	+10	
