= Greater Manchester Open =

Tournament information
- Location: Wilmslow, Cheshire, England
- Established: 1975
- Course: Wilmslow Golf Club
- Par: 70
- Tour: European Tour
- Format: Stroke play
- Prize fund: £40,000
- Month played: June
- Final year: 1981

Tournament record score
- Aggregate: 264 Bernard Gallacher (1981)
- To par: −16 as above

Final champion
- (Scotland) Bernard Gallacher
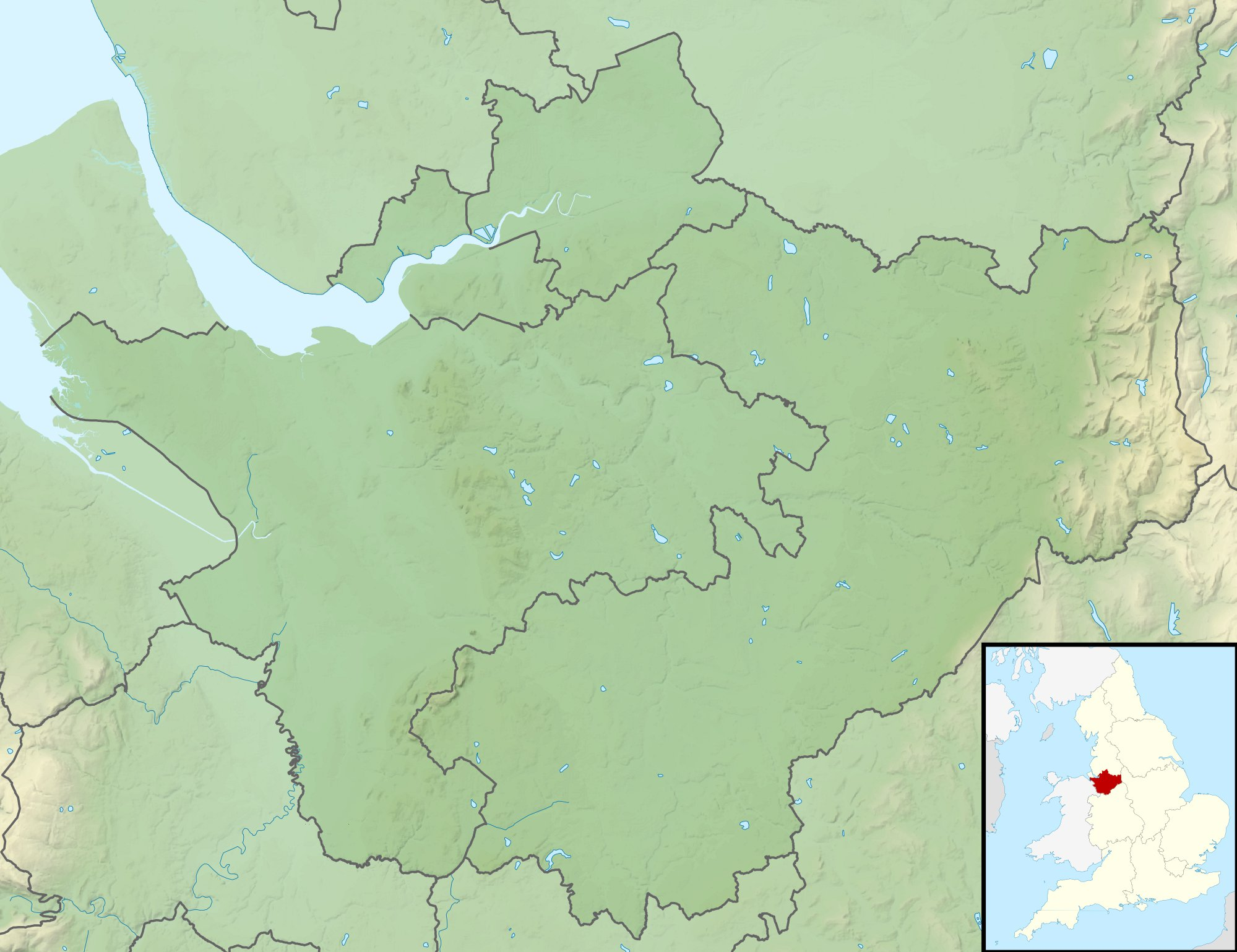
- Location in England Location in Cheshire

The Greater Manchester Open was a professional golf tournament which was played annually from 1975 to 1981. It was a European Tour event from 1976. It was held at Wilmslow Golf Club in Wilmslow, Cheshire, just to the south of Manchester. Three of the six winners were from Ireland, and a fourth, Mark McNulty, became an Irish citizen many years later. In 1981 the prize fund was £40,000, which was the third smallest on the European Tour that season.

== Winners ==
Year	Winner	Score	To par	Margin of victory	Runner(s)-up	Winner's share (£)	Ref.
Cold Shield Greater Manchester Open
1982	Cancelled due to lack of funding						
1981	(Scotland) Bernard Gallacher	264	−16	5 strokes	(England) Nick Faldo	7,000	
1980	(Republic of Ireland) Des Smyth	273	−7	Playoff (Note: Smyth won with birdie on sixth extra hole.)	(England) Brian Waites	5,830	
Greater Manchester Open
1979	(Southern Rhodesia) Mark McNulty	267	−13	5 strokes	(Spain) Manuel Piñero	5,000	
1978	(Scotland) Brian Barnes	275	−5	Playoff (Note: Barnes won with birdie on first extra hole.)	(New Zealand) Bob Charles (England) Denis Durnian (England) Nick Job	4,000	
1977	(Republic of Ireland) Eamonn Darcy	269	−11	8 strokes	(Scotland) Brian Barnes (Scotland) Ken Brown (England) John Morgan	4,000	
1976	(Republic of Ireland) John O'Leary	276	−4	4 strokes	(South Africa) John Fourie	2,200	
1975	(England) Howard Clark	284				1,000	
