= Italian BP Open =

Men's professional golf tournament

Tournament information
- Location: Rome, Italy
- Established: 1968
- Month played: March/April
- Final year: 1972

Final champion
- (England) Peter Wilcock

The Italian BP Open was a men's professional golf tournament played from 1968 to 1972 in the Rome area of Italy. The 1972 tournament was not part of the inaugural European Tour season.

== Winners ==
Year	Winner	Country	Venue	Score	Margin of victory	Runner(s)-up	Winner's share (£)	Ref
1968	Roberto Bernardini	Italy		284	5 strokes	(Italy) Bruno Ghezzo		
1969	Bernard Hunt	England	Olgiata	282	2 strokes	(Italy) Roberto Bernardini	1,000	
1970	Neil Coles	England		282	3 strokes	(Spain) Valentín Barrios	1,000	
1971	Roberto Bernardini	Italy	Olgiata	284	1 stroke	(Spain) Ramón Sota		
1972	Peter Wilcock	England	Olgiata	277	6 strokes	(Italy) Baldovino Dassù		
