= Baldovino Dassù =

Italian golfer (born 1952)

Personal information
- Nationality: Italy
- Born: 3 January 1952 (age 74) Florence, Italy
- Height: 1.88 m (6 ft 2 in)

Career
- Sport: Golf
- Turned professional: 1971
- Former tours: European Tour; Alps Tour
- Professional wins: 10

Number of wins by tour
- European Tour: 2
- Other: 8

Best results in major championships
- Masters Tournament: DNP
- PGA Championship: DNP
- U.S. Open: DNP
- The Open Championship: T36: 1977

Baldovino Dassù (born 3 November 1952) is an Italian golfer.

== Professional career ==
Dassù won the 1970 British Youths Open Amateur Championship and played for Italy in that year's Eisenhower Trophy. He turned professional in 1971 and was a regular on the European Tour from its first official season in 1972 until the mid-1980s. His most successful season by far was 1976, when he won his only two European Tour titles at the Dunlop Masters and the Italian Open, which he won by eight shots, and went on to finish ninth on the Order of Merit. Off the tour he won the Italian Professional Championship in 1974, 1976 and 1977. He represented Italy in the Alfred Dunhill Cup twice and in the World Cup of Golf four times.

As a senior, Dassù played the European Seniors Tour for one season, finishing 26th on the 2003 Order of Merit.

== Professional wins (9) ==
=== European Tour wins (2) ===
No.	Date	Tournament	Winning score	Margin of victory	Runner(s)-up
1	2 Oct 1976	Dunlop Masters	−13 (66-68-68-69=271)	1 stroke	(United States) Hubert Green
2	24 Oct 1976	Italian Open	−8 (71-71-69-69=280)	8 strokes	(England) Carl Mason, (Spain) Manuel Piñero

=== Alps Tour wins (1) ===
No.	Date	Tournament	Winning score	Margin of victory	Runners-up
1	6 Apr 2001	Executive Group Modena Open	−5 (70-69-72=211)	1 stroke	(Italy) Gianluca Pietrobono, (Italy) Marco Soffietti

=== Other wins (7) ===
This list may be incomplete

- 1974 Italian National Professional Championship
- 1976 Italian National Professional Championship
- 1977 Italian National Professional Championship
- 1983 Italian PGA Championship, Open dei Tessali
- 1985 Cerutti Open
- 1988 Open dei Tessali

== Results in major championships ==
Tournament	1972	1973	1974	1975	1976	1977	1978	1979	1980	1981	1982	1983	1984	1985
The Open Championship	CUT	T39		CUT		T36	CUT		CUT					CUT

Note: Dassu only played in The Open Championship.

Did not play

CUT = missed the half-way cut (3rd round cut in 1972 and 1978 Open Championships)
"T" = tied

== Team appearances ==
Amateur

- European Amateur Team Championship (representing Italy): 1969
- Eisenhower Trophy (representing Italy): 1970
- St Andrews Trophy (representing the Continent of Europe): 1970

Professional

- World Cup (representing Italy): 1976, 1979, 1980, 1982
- Marlboro Nations' Cup/Philip Morris International (representing Italy): 1972, 1976
- Hennessy Cognac Cup (representing the Continent of Europe): 1976, 1978, 1980, 1982, (representing Italy) 1984
- Double Diamond International (representing Continental Europe): 1977
- Dunhill Cup (representing Italy): 1986
