= 1982 World Cup (men's golf) =

Tournament information
- Dates: 2–5 December
- Location: Acapulco, Guererro, Mexico; 16°51′49″N 99°52′57″W
- Course: Pierre Marques Golf Club
- Format: 72 holes stroke play combined score

Statistics
- Par: 71
- Length: 6,860 yards (6,270 m)
- Field: 31 two-man teams
- Cut: None

Champion
- Spain; José María Cañizares & Manuel Piñero
- 563 (−5)

Location map
- Location in North America Location in Mexico Location in Guererro

The 1982 World Cup took place 2–5 December 1982 at Pierre Marques Golf Club in Acapulco, Mexico. It was the 29th World Cup event. The previous World Cup was played in 1980, since the 1981 event was cancelled. The tournament was a 72-hole stroke play team event with 31 teams. Each team consisted of two players from a country. The combined score of each team determined the team results. The Spain team of José María Cañizares and Manuel Piñero won by three strokes over the United States team of Bobby Clampett and Bob Gilder. It was the third Spanish victory in the last six World Cup tournaments. The individual competition for The International Trophy, was won by Pinero one stroke ahead of Canizares and Gilder.

== Teams ==
Country	Players
Argentina	Florentino Molina and Adan Sowa
Australia	Mike Cahill and Mike Clayton
Austria	Oswald Gartenmaier and Franz Laimer
Belgium	Philippe Toussaint and Andre Van Damme
Brazil	Jose Diniz and Federico German
Canada	Dave Barr and Dan Halldorson
Chile	Luis Cabrera and Francisco Cerda
Colombia	Luis Arevaio and Alberto Ribadener
England	Mark James and Brian Waites
France	Jean Garaïalde and Géry Watine
Ireland	John O'Leary and Des Smyth
Italy	Baldovino Dassù and Piero Molteni
Japan	Pete Izumikawa and Namio Takasu
Malaysia	Marimuthu Ramayah and Nazamuddin Yusof
Mexico	Antonio Oscar Cerdá and Victor Regalado
Morocco	Mohamed Makroune and Fatmi Moussa
Netherlands	Jan Dorrestien and Cess Renders
New Zealand	Richard Coombes and Frank Nobilo
Pakistan	Ghulam Nabi and Mohammed Shafique
Philippines	Eleuterio Nival and Mario Siodina
Scotland	Bernard Gallacher and Sam Torrance
Singapore	Lim Kiang Tiong and Fung Hee Kwan
South Korea	Choi Sang-ho and Han Chang-sang
Spain	José María Cañizares and Manuel Piñero
Thailand	Suthep Meesawad and Uthai Thabpavibul
United States	Bobby Clampett and Bob Gilder
Uruguay	Juan Rodriguez Aguirre and Hugo Santurio
Venezuela	Freddy Acevedo and Ramón Muñoz
Wales	Keith Williams and Ian Woosnam
West Germany	Torsten Giedeon and Heinz-Peter Thül
Zimbabwe	Don Gammon and Tim Price

== Scores ==
Team

Place	Country	Score	To par
1	Spain	139-140-138-146=563	−5
2	United States	144-144-140-138=566	−2
3	Italy	143-144-144-144=574	+6
4	England	146-144-142-143=575	+7
5	South Korea	143-145-144-146=578	+10
6	Mexico	143-148-148-140=579	+11
7	Scotland	145-146-146-144=581	+13
8	Ireland	146-143-148-148=585	+17
9	Canada	141-148-150-147=586	+18
T10	Argentina	150-144-149-144=587	+19
T10	Brazil	149-148-148-142=587	+19
T12	Australia	151-144-144-155=594	+26
T12	Japan	146-148-150-148=594	+26
14	Philippines	146-147-142-160=595	+27
15	Thailand	151-148-152-150=597	+29
16	Colombia	150-154-146-149=599	+31
17	Chile	152-148-147-155=602	+34
18	New Zealand	146-151-154-152=603	+35
T19	France	153-156-149-146=604	+36
T19	Malaysia	153-154-150-147=604	+36
21	Morocco	150-151-154-153=608	+40
T22	Wales	155-152-150-152=609	+41
T22	West Germany	144-152-156-152=609	+41
T24	Netherlands	156-149-155-152=612	+44
T24	Pakistan	152-148-153-159=612	+44
T24	Singapore	159-148-149-156=612	+44
T24	Venezuela	151-155-152-154=612	+44
28	Austria	154-155-154-155=618	+50
29	Zimbabwe	158-155-162-159=624	+56
30	Belgium	155-159-153-158=625	+57
31	Uruguay	167-165-167-169=668	+100

International Trophy

Place	Player	Country	Score	To par
1	Manuel Piñero	Spain	72-65-71-73=281	−3
T2	José María Cañizares	Spain	67-75-67-73=282	−2
T2	Bob Gilder	United States	71-74-69-68=282	−2
4	Baldovino Dassù	Italy	69-70-70-74=283	−1
5	Bobby Clampett	United States	73-70-71-70=284	E
T6	Choi Sang-ho	South Korea	72-71-71-73=287	+3
T6	Bernard Gallacher	Scotland	68-72-74-73=287	+3
T6	Dan Halldorson	Canada	68-72-74-73=287	+3
T6	Mark James	England	74-72-70-71=287	+3
T10	Antonio Oscar Cerdá	Mexico	72-75-74-67=288	+4
T10	Brian Waites	England	72-72-72-72=288	+4
