= José María Cañizares =

Spanish professional golfer

Personal information
- Full name: José María Cañizares
- Nationality: Spain
- Born: 18 February 1947 (age 79) Madrid, Spain
- Height: 5 ft 10 in (1.78 m)
- Spouse: Felicidad
- Children: Genoveva, Gabriel, Alejandro

Career
- Sport: Golf
- Turned professional: 1967
- Current tours: Champions Tour; European Seniors Tour
- Former tour: European Tour
- Professional wins: 19

Number of wins by tour
- European Tour: 6
- PGA Tour Champions: 1
- Other: 12

Best results in major championships
- Masters Tournament: DNP
- PGA Championship: CUT: 1986
- U.S. Open: DNP
- The Open Championship: T11: 1985, 1986

José María Cañizares (born 18 February 1947) is a Spanish golfer.

== Early life ==
Cañizares was born in Madrid.

== Professional career ==
In 1967, he turned professional. He made the top hundred on the European Tour Order of Merit every year from the first season in 1972 through to 1993. He placed in the top ten five times, with a best ranking of fourth in 1983. He won six events on the tour.

Cañizares was a member of four European Ryder Cup teams and had a record of 5 wins, 4 losses and two ties, including 2.5 points in four singles matches. In 1985 his singles victory over Fuzzy Zoeller rubber-stamped a European win that took the trophy from the Americans for the first time in 28 years. In 1989 his putt to beat Ken Green on the 18th at The Belfry ensured a 14–14 tie and keep the cup in European hands.

Cañizares won the World Cup team event for Spain on two occasions. In 1982, his partner was Manuel Piñero. In 1984, he teamed up with José Rivero, and on that occasion he also took the individual prize.

After becoming eligible for senior tournaments in 1997 Cañizares played mainly on the U.S.-based Champions Tour. He won once as a senior, at the 2001 Toshiba Senior Classic. In 2000 he had ten top ten finishes and set a then tour record for season earnings without a win of US$1,155,939. He also played a few times on the European Seniors Tour.

== Personal life ==
Cañizares' son Alejandro won a European Tour event in 2006 and a second one in 2014.

== Professional wins (19) ==
=== European Tour wins (6) ===
No.	Date	Tournament	Winning score	Margin of victory	Runner(s)-up
1	22 Oct 1972	Lancia d'Oro	−5 (69-70-75-73=287)	Playoff	(England) Peter Townsend
2	1 Jun 1980	Avis Jersey Open	+1 (71-67-71-72=281)	2 strokes	(Scotland) Steve Martin
3	28 Sep 1980	Bob Hope British Classic	−19 (68-67-70-64=269)	1 stroke	(Spain) Seve Ballesteros, (United States) Lee Trevino, (England) Brian Waites
4	3 May 1981	Italian Open	−8 (68-71-70-71=280)	Playoff	(United States) Bobby Clampett
5	25 Sep 1983	Bob Hope British Classic (2)	−19 (70-65-68-66=269)	1 stroke	(Northern Ireland) David Feherty
6	5 Apr 1992	Roma Masters	−2 (72-71-69-74=286)	Playoff	(England) Barry Lane

European Tour playoff record (3–3)

No.	Year	Tournament	Opponent(s)	Result
1	1972	Lancia d'Oro	(England) Peter Townsend	Won with birdie on fifth extra hole
2	1981	Italian Open	(United States) Bobby Clampett	Won with birdie on first extra hole
3	1983	Paco Rabanne Open de France	(England) Nick Faldo, (England) David J. Russell	Faldo won with par on third extra hole Russell eliminated by birdie on first hole
4	1983	Martini International	(England) Nick Faldo	Lost to par on third extra hole
5	1985	Cepsa Madrid Open	(Spain) Manuel Piñero	Lost to birdie on fourth extra hole
6	1992	Roma Masters	(England) Barry Lane	Won with birdie on second extra hole

=== Safari Circuit wins (1) ===
No.	Date	Tournament	Winning score	Margin of victory	Runner-up
1	11 Mar 1984	555 Kenya Open	−7 (69-72-69-67=277)	Playoff	(England) David J. Russell

=== Other wins (11) ===
- 1970 Spanish Professional Closed Championship
- 1977 Memorial Olivier Barras, Spanish Professional Closed Championship
- 1978 Spanish Professional Closed Championship
- 1982 World Cup of Golf (team with Manuel Piñero), Spanish Professional Closed Championship
- 1984 World Cup of Golf (team with José Rivero), World Cup of Golf Individual Trophy
- 1988 Volvo Open (Spain)
- 1990 Benson & Hedges Trophy (with Tania Abitbol)
- 1991 Spanish Professional Closed Championship

=== Senior PGA Tour wins (1) ===
No.	Date	Tournament	Winning score	Margin of victory	Runner-up
1	4 Mar 2001	Toshiba Senior Classic	−11 (65-70-67=202)	Playoff	(United States) Gil Morgan

Senior PGA Tour playoff record (1–3)

No.	Year	Tournament	Opponent(s)	Result
1	1998	Bell Atlantic Classic	(United States) Jay Sigel	Lost to birdie on third extra hole
2	1999	Southwestern Bell Dominion	(United States) Bruce Fleisher, (United States) John Mahaffey	Mahaffey won with birdie on second extra hole Fleisher eliminated by birdie on first hole
3	2000	ACE Group Classic	(United States) Walter Hall, (United States) Lanny Wadkins, (United States) Tom Watson	Wadkins won with par on third extra hole Hall and Watson eliminated by par on first hole
4	2001	Toshiba Senior Classic	(United States) Gil Morgan	Won with birdie on ninth extra hole

== Results in major championships ==
Tournament	1975	1976	1977	1978	1979
The Open Championship	CUT				
PGA Championship					

Tournament	1980	1981	1982	1983	1984	1985	1986	1987	1988	1989
The Open Championship	CUT	CUT	T22	CUT	T36	T11	T11	CUT	CUT	
PGA Championship							CUT			

Tournament	1990	1991	1992	1993	1994
The Open Championship	72	CUT	CUT		CUT
PGA Championship					

Note: Cañizares never played in the Masters Tournament nor the U.S. Open.

Did not play

CUT = missed the half-way cut (3rd round cut in 1975 and 1981 Open Championships)
"T" = tied

== Team appearances ==
- World Cup (representing Spain): 1974, 1980, 1982 (winners), 1983, 1984 (winners, individual winner), 1985, 1987, 1989
- Ryder Cup (representing Europe): 1981, 1983, 1985 (winners), 1989 (tied, cup retained)
- Double Diamond International (representing Continental Europe): 1974
- Sotogrande Match/Hennessy Cognac Cup (representing the Continent of Europe): 1974, 1976, 1978, 1980, 1982, (representing Spain) 1984
- Philip Morris International (representing Spain): 1975
- Dunhill Cup (representing Spain): 1985, 1987, 1989, 1990
- Praia d'El Rey European Cup: 1997 (winners)
- UBS Warburg Cup (representing the Rest of the World): 2001
