= World Cup (men's golf) =

Golf tournament for national teams

The World Cup of Golf is a men's golf tournament contested by teams of two representing their country. Only one team is allowed from each country. The players are selected on the basis of the Official World Golf Ranking, although not all of the first choice players choose to compete. The equivalent event for women was the Women's World Cup of Golf, played from 2005 to 2008.

== History ==
The tournament was founded by industrialist John Jay Hopkins, who hoped it would promote international goodwill through golf. It began in 1953 as the Canada Cup and changed its name to the World Cup in 1967. With Fred Corcoran as the Tournament Director and the International Golf Association behind it (1955–1977), the World Cup traveled the globe and grew to be one of golf's most prestigious tournaments throughout the 1960s and 1970s, but interest in the event faded to the point that the event was not held in 1981 or 1986.

The tournament was incorporated into the World Golf Championships series from 2000 to 2006. In 2007 it ceased to be a World Golf Championships event, but continued to be sanctioned by the International Federation of PGA Tours.

From 2007 through 2009 the tournament was held at the Mission Hills Golf Club in Shenzhen, China, receiving the name Mission Hills World Cup. There was no tournament in 2010, it having been announced that the event would change from annual to biennial, held in odd-numbered years, to accommodate the 2016 inclusion of golf at the Olympics. The 2011 tournament was at a new venue — Mission Hills Haikou in the Chinese island province of Hainan.

The United States has a clear lead in wins, with 24 as of 2018.

== Format ==
In 1953, the format was 36 holes of stroke play with the combined score of the two-man team determining the winner. From 1954 to 1999, the format was 72 holes of stroke play. Beginning in 2000, the format became alternating stroke play rounds of bestball (fourball) and alternate shot (foursomes).

The 2013 tournament was primarily an individual event with a team component. The 60-player field was selected based on the Official World Golf Ranking (OWGR) with up to two players per country allowed to qualify (four per country if they are within the top 15 of the OWGR). The format returned to 72 holes of stroke play, with the individuals competing for US$7 million of the $8 million total purse. OWGR points were awarded for the first time. The top two-ranked players from each country competed for the team portion, using combined stroke play scores. The individual portion was similar to what would be used at the 2016 Summer Olympics, except that England, Scotland, and Wales had teams instead of a single Great Britain team as in the Olympics, while Northern Ireland and the Republic of Ireland again played as a single team.

In 2016, the format reverted to that used from 2000 to 2011.

From 1955 to 1999, there was also a separate award, the International Trophy, for the individual with the best 72-hole score.

== Team winners ==
Year	Winners	Team	Location	Runners-up
ISPS Handa Melbourne World Cup of Golf
2018	Belgium	Thomas Detry and Thomas Pieters	Melbourne, Australia	Australia – Marc Leishman and Cameron Smith; Mexico – Abraham Ancer and Roberto Díaz
ISPS Handa World Cup of Golf
2017	No tournament			
2016	Denmark	Søren Kjeldsen and Thorbjørn Olesen	Melbourne, Australia	China – Li Haotong and Wu Ashun; France – Victor Dubuisson and Romain Langasque; United States – Rickie Fowler and Jimmy Walker
2014–2015	No tournament			
2013	Australia	Jason Day and Adam Scott	Melbourne, Australia	United States – Matt Kuchar and Kevin Streelman
2012	No tournament			
Omega Mission Hills World Cup
2011	United States	Matt Kuchar and Gary Woodland	Haikou, Hainan Island, China	England – Ian Poulter and Justin Rose; Germany – Martin Kaymer and Alex Čejka
2010	No tournament			
2009	Italy	Edoardo Molinari and Francesco Molinari	Shenzhen, China	Sweden – Henrik Stenson and Robert Karlsson; Ireland^{1} – Rory McIlroy and Graeme McDowell
2008	Sweden	Robert Karlsson and Henrik Stenson	Shenzhen, China	Spain – Miguel Ángel Jiménez and Pablo Larrazábal
2007	Scotland	Colin Montgomerie and Marc Warren	Shenzhen, China	United States – Heath Slocum and Boo Weekley
WGC-World Cup
2006	Germany	Bernhard Langer and Marcel Siem	Sandy Lane Resort, Barbados	Scotland – Colin Montgomerie and Marc Warren
2005	Wales	Stephen Dodd and Bradley Dredge	Algarve, Portugal	England – Luke Donald and David Howell; Sweden – Niclas Fasth and Henrik Stenson
2004	England	Paul Casey and Luke Donald	Seville, Spain	Spain – Sergio García and Miguel Ángel Jiménez
2003	South Africa	Trevor Immelman and Rory Sabbatini	Kiawah Island, South Carolina, United States	England – Paul Casey and Justin Rose
2002	Japan	Toshimitsu Izawa and Shigeki Maruyama	Puerto Vallarta, Mexico	United States – Phil Mickelson and David Toms
2001	South Africa	Ernie Els and Retief Goosen	Gotemba, Shizuoka	Denmark – Thomas Bjørn and Søren Hansen; New Zealand – Michael Campbell and David Smail; United States – David Duval and Tiger Woods
2000	United States	David Duval and Tiger Woods	Buenos Aires, Argentina	Argentina – Eduardo Romero and Ángel Cabrera
World Cup of Golf
1999	United States	Mark O'Meara and Tiger Woods	Kuala Lumpur, Malaysia	Spain – Santiago Luna and Miguel Ángel Martín
1998	England	David Carter and Nick Faldo	Auckland, New Zealand	Italy – Massimo Florioli and Costantino Rocca
1997	Ireland	Pádraig Harrington and Paul McGinley	Kiawah Island, South Carolina, United States	Scotland – Colin Montgomerie and Raymond Russell
1996	South Africa	Ernie Els and Wayne Westner	Cape Town, South Africa	United States – Steve Jones and Tom Lehman
1995	United States	Fred Couples and Davis Love III	Shenzhen, China	Australia – Robert Allenby and Steve Elkington
1994	United States	Fred Couples and Davis Love III	Dorado, Puerto Rico	Zimbabwe – Tony Johnstone and Mark McNulty
1993	United States	Fred Couples and Davis Love III	Orlando, Florida, United States	Zimbabwe – Mark McNulty and Nick Price
World Cup
1992	United States	Fred Couples and Davis Love III	Madrid, Spain	Sweden – Anders Forsbrand and Per-Ulrik Johansson
1991	Sweden	Anders Forsbrand and Per-Ulrik Johansson	Rome, Italy	Wales – Phillip Price and Ian Woosnam
1990	Germany	Torsten Giedeon and Bernhard Langer	Orlando, Florida, United States	England – Richard Boxall and Mark James; Ireland^{1} – David Feherty and Ronan Rafferty
1989	Australia	Peter Fowler and Wayne Grady	Marbella, Spain	Spain – José María Cañizares and José María Olazábal
1988	United States	Ben Crenshaw and Mark McCumber	Melbourne, Australia	Japan – Masashi Ozaki and Tateo Ozaki
1987	Wales	David Llewellyn and Ian Woosnam	Maui, Hawaii, United States	Scotland – Sandy Lyle and Sam Torrance
1986	No tournament			
1985	Canada	Dave Barr and Dan Halldorson	La Quinta, California, United States	England – Howard Clark and Paul Way
1984	Spain	José María Cañizares and José Rivero	Rome, Italy	Scotland – Gordon Brand Jnr and Sam Torrance; Taiwan – Hsieh Min-Nan and Chen Tze-chung
1983	United States	Rex Caldwell and John Cook	Jakarta, Indonesia	Australia – Terry Gale and Wayne Grady; Canada – Jerry Anderson and Dave Barr
1982	Spain	José María Cañizares and Manuel Piñero	Acapulco, Mexico	United States – Bobby Clampett and Bob Gilder
1981	No tournament			
1980	Canada	Dan Halldorson and Jim Nelford	Bogotá, Colombia	Scotland – Sandy Lyle and Steve Martin
1979	United States	Hale Irwin and John Mahaffey	Athens, Greece	Scotland – Sandy Lyle and Ken Brown
1978	United States	John Mahaffey and Andy North	Hanalei, Hawaii, United States	Australia – Wayne Grady and Greg Norman
1977	Spain	Seve Ballesteros and Antonio Garrido	Manila, Philippines	Philippines – Ben Arda and Rudy Lavares
1976	Spain	Seve Ballesteros and Manuel Piñero	Palm Springs, California, United States	United States – Jerry Pate and Dave Stockton
1975	United States	Lou Graham and Johnny Miller	Bangkok, Thailand	Taiwan – Hsieh Min-Nan and Kuo Chie-Hsiung
1974	South Africa	Bobby Cole and Dale Hayes	Caracas, Venezuela	Japan – Isao Aoki and Masashi Ozaki
1973	United States	Johnny Miller and Jack Nicklaus	Marbella, Spain	South Africa – Hugh Baiocchi and Gary Player
1972	Republic of China	Hsieh Min-Nan and Lu Liang-Huan	Melbourne, Australia	Japan – Takaaki Kono and Takashi Murakami
1971	United States	Jack Nicklaus and Lee Trevino	Palm Beach Gardens, Florida, United States	South Africa – Harold Henning and Gary Player
1970	Australia	Bruce Devlin and David Graham	Buenos Aires, Argentina	Argentina – Roberto De Vicenzo and Vicente Fernández
1969	United States	Orville Moody and Lee Trevino	Singapore	Japan – Takaaki Kono and Haruo Yasuda
1968	Canada	Al Balding and George Knudson	Rome, Italy	United States – Julius Boros and Lee Trevino
1967	United States	Jack Nicklaus and Arnold Palmer	Mexico City, Mexico	New Zealand – Bob Charles and Walter Godfrey
Canada Cup
1966	United States	Jack Nicklaus and Arnold Palmer	Tokyo, Japan	South Africa – Harold Henning and Gary Player
1965	South Africa	Harold Henning and Gary Player	Madrid, Spain	Spain – Ángel Miguel and Ramón Sota
1964	United States	Jack Nicklaus and Arnold Palmer	Maui, Hawaii, United States	Argentina – Roberto De Vicenzo and Leopoldo Ruiz
1963	United States	Jack Nicklaus and Arnold Palmer	Paris, France	Spain – Sebastián Miguel and Ramón Sota
1962	United States	Arnold Palmer and Sam Snead	Buenos Aires, Argentina	Argentina – Fidel de Luca and Roberto De Vicenzo
1961	United States	Jimmy Demaret and Sam Snead	Dorado, Puerto Rico	Australia – Kel Nagle and Peter Thomson
1960	United States	Arnold Palmer and Sam Snead	Portmarnock, Dublin, Ireland	England – Bernard Hunt and Harry Weetman
1959	Australia	Kel Nagle and Peter Thomson	Melbourne, Australia	United States – Cary Middlecoff and Sam Snead
1958	Ireland	Harry Bradshaw and Christy O'Connor Snr	Mexico City, Mexico	Spain – Ángel Miguel and Sebastián Miguel
1957	Japan	Torakichi Nakamura and Koichi Ono	Tokyo, Japan	United States – Jimmy Demaret and Sam Snead
1956	United States	Ben Hogan and Sam Snead	Wentworth, Surrey, England	South Africa – Bobby Locke and Gary Player
1955	United States	Ed Furgol and Chick Harbert	Washington, D.C., United States	Australia – Kel Nagle and Peter Thomson
1954	Australia	Kel Nagle and Peter Thomson	Montreal, Canada	Argentina – Antonio Cerdá and Roberto De Vicenzo
1953	Argentina	Antonio Cerdá and Roberto De Vicenzo	Montreal, Canada	Canada – Bill Kerr and Stan Leonard

^{1}This was a combined Republic of Ireland and Northern Ireland team. They competed under the Republic of Ireland flag although both golfers were from Northern Ireland.

=== Performance by nation ===
Team	Champions	Runners-up
United States	24	11
Australia	5	6
South Africa	5	4
Spain	4	7
Canada	3	2
England	2	6
Japan	2	4
Sweden	2	3
Ireland	2	2
Wales	2	1
Germany	2	1
Scotland	1	6
Argentina	1	5
Taiwan	1	2
Denmark	1	1
Italy	1	1
Belgium	1	0
New Zealand	0	2
Zimbabwe	0	2
China	0	1
France	0	1
Mexico	0	1
Philippines	0	1

== Individual winners ==
Year	Winner	Country	Score	To par	Margin of victory	Runner(s)-up
2016–2018: No individual tournament
2013	Jason Day	Australia	274	−10	2 strokes	(Denmark) Thomas Bjørn
2000–2011: No individual tournament
1999	Tiger Woods	United States	263	−21	9 strokes	(New Zealand) Frank Nobilo
1998	Scott Verplank	United States	279	−9	1 stroke	(England) Nick Faldo (Italy) Costantino Rocca
1997	Colin Montgomerie	Scotland	266	−22	2 strokes	(Germany) Alex Čejka
1996	Ernie Els	South Africa	272	−16	3 strokes	(South Africa) Wayne Westner
1995	Davis Love III	United States	267	−21	Playoff	(Japan) Hisayuki Sasaki
1994	Fred Couples	United States	265	−23	5 strokes	(Italy) Costantino Rocca
1993	Bernhard Langer	Germany	272	−16	3 strokes	(United States) Fred Couples
1992	Brett Ogle	Australia	270	−18	Playoff	(Wales) Ian Woosnam
1991	Ian Woosnam	Wales	273	−15	3 strokes	(Germany) Bernhard Langer
1990	Payne Stewart	United States	271	−17	2 strokes	(Denmark) Anders Sørensen
1989	Peter Fowler	Australia	137	−7	1 stroke	(Spain) José María Cañizares (Denmark) Anders Sørensen
1988	Ben Crenshaw	United States	275	−13	1 stroke	(Japan) Tateo Ozaki
1987	Ian Woosnam	Wales	274	−14	5 strokes	(Scotland) Sandy Lyle
1986: No tournament
1985	Howard Clark	England	272	−16	5 strokes	(Republic of Ireland) Christy O'Connor Jnr
1984	José María Cañizares	Spain	205	−11	2 strokes	(Scotland) Gordon Brand Jnr
1983	Dave Barr	Canada	276	−12	3 strokes	(United States) Rex Caldwell
1982	Manuel Piñero	Spain	281	−3	1 stroke	(Spain) José María Cañizares (United States) Bob Gilder
1981: No tournament
1980	Sandy Lyle	Scotland	282	−6	1 stroke	(West Germany) Bernhard Langer
1979	Hale Irwin	United States	285	−3	2 strokes	(West Germany) Bernhard Langer (Scotland) Sandy Lyle
1978	John Mahaffey	United States	281	−7	2 strokes	(United States) Andy North
1977	Gary Player	South Africa	289	+1	3 strokes	(United States) Hubert Green (Philippines) Rudy Lavares
1976	Ernesto Perez Acosta	Mexico	282	−6	3 strokes	(Scotland) Brian Barnes (Spain) Manuel Piñero
1975	Johnny Miller	United States	275	−13	2 strokes	(Philippines) Ben Arda (Taiwan) Hsieh Min-Nan (Australia) Bob Shearer
1974	Bobby Cole	South Africa	271	−9	5 strokes	(Japan) Masashi Ozaki
1973	Johnny Miller	United States	277	−11	3 strokes	(South Africa) Gary Player
1972	Hsieh Min-Nan	Taiwan	217	+1	2 strokes	(Japan) Takaaki Kono
1971	Jack Nicklaus	United States	271	−17	7 strokes	(South Africa) Gary Player
1970	Roberto De Vicenzo	Argentina	269	−19	1 stroke	(Australia) David Graham
1969	Lee Trevino	United States	275	−9	1 stroke	(Argentina) Roberto De Vicenzo
1968	Al Balding	Canada	274	−14	5 strokes	(Italy) Roberto Bernardini
1967	Arnold Palmer	United States	276	−12	5 strokes	(New Zealand) Bob Charles (United States) Jack Nicklaus
1966	George Knudson	Canada	272	−16	Playoff	(Japan) Hideyo Sugimoto
1965	Gary Player	South Africa	281	−7	3 strokes	(United States) Jack Nicklaus
1964	Jack Nicklaus	United States	276	−12	2 strokes	(United States) Arnold Palmer
1963	Jack Nicklaus	United States	237	−15	5 strokes	(Spain) Sebastián Miguel (South Africa) Gary Player
1962	Roberto De Vicenzo	Argentina	276	−4	2 strokes	(England) Peter Alliss (United States) Arnold Palmer
1961	Sam Snead	United States	272	−16	8 strokes	(Australia) Peter Thomson
1960	Flory Van Donck	Belgium	279	−9	2 strokes	(United States) Sam Snead
1959	Stan Leonard	Canada	275	−5	Playoff	(Australia) Peter Thomson
1958	Ángel Miguel	Spain	286	−2	Playoff	(Republic of Ireland) Harry Bradshaw
1957	Torakichi Nakamura	Japan	274	−14	7 strokes	(South Africa) Gary Player (United States) Sam Snead (Wales) Dave Thomas
1956	Ben Hogan	United States	277	−7	5 strokes	(Argentina) Roberto De Vicenzo
1955	Ed Furgol	United States	279	−1	Playoff	(Australia) Peter Thomson (Belgium) Flory Van Donck
1953–54: No individual award

== Multiple winners ==
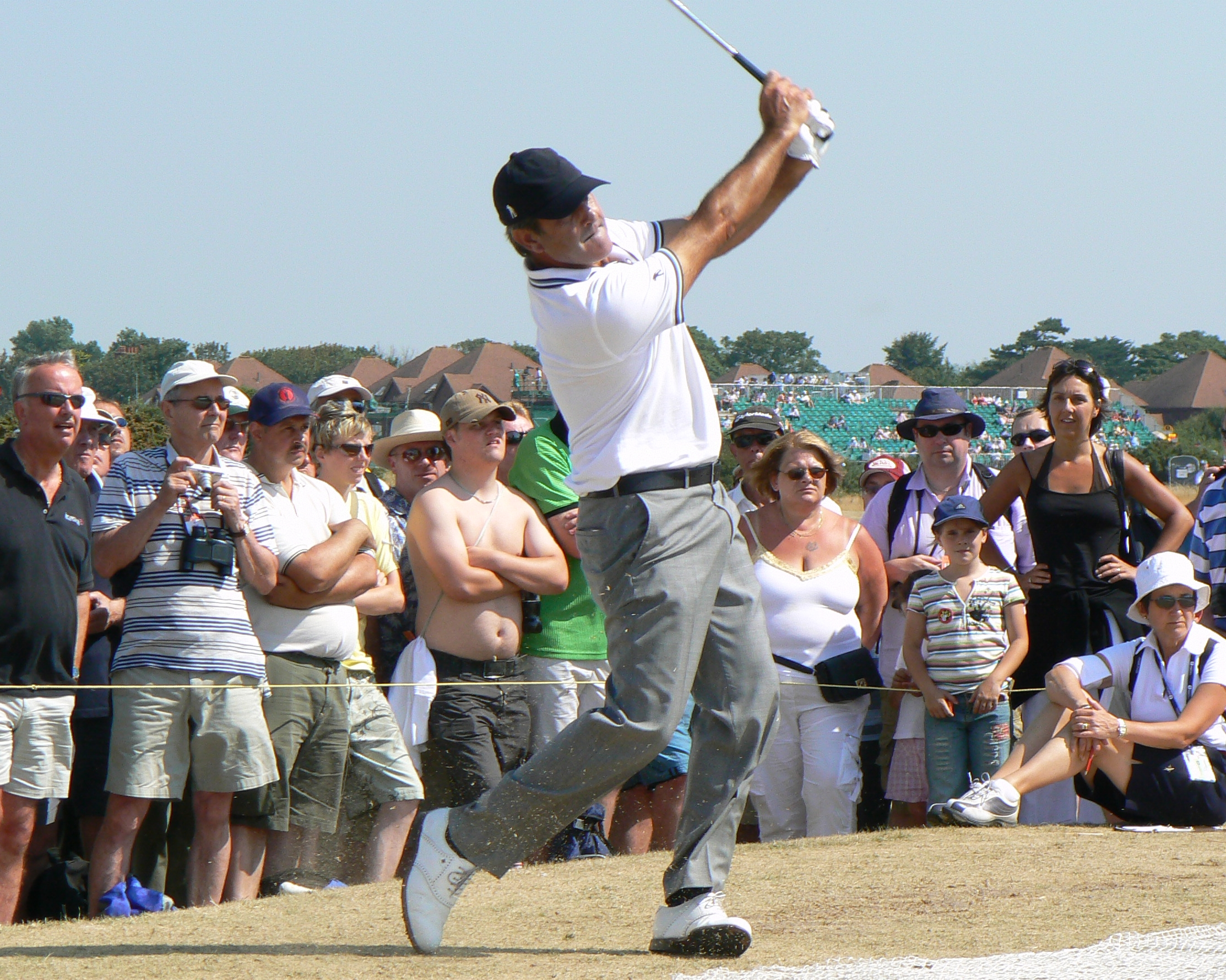
Seve Ballesteros won the title twice as part of the Spanish team.

=== Teammates ===
- 4 times: Jack Nicklaus and Arnold Palmer, Fred Couples and Davis Love III
- 2 times: Kel Nagle and Peter Thomson, Arnold Palmer and Sam Snead

=== As part of team ===
- 6 times: Jack Nicklaus, Arnold Palmer
- 4 times: Fred Couples, Davis Love III, Sam Snead
- 2 times: Seve Ballesteros, José María Cañizares, Ernie Els, Dan Halldorson, Bernhard Langer, John Mahaffey, Johnny Miller, Kel Nagle, Manuel Piñero, Peter Thomson, Lee Trevino, Tiger Woods

=== As individual (International Trophy) ===
- 3 times: Jack Nicklaus
- 2 times: Roberto De Vicenzo, Johnny Miller, Gary Player, Ian Woosnam
