= 1953 Ryder Cup =

Golf tournament held in England

10th Ryder Cup Matches
- Dates: 2–3 October 1953
- Venue: Wentworth Club
- Location: Surrey, England
- Captains: Henry Cotton (Great Britain); Lloyd Mangrum (USA)
(United Kingdom)	5 1/2	6 1/2	(United States)
- United States wins the Ryder Cup

Location map
- Location within England

The 10th Ryder Cup Matches were held 2–3 October 1953 at Wentworth Club in Virginia Water, Surrey, England, west of London. The United States team won its sixth consecutive competition by a score of 6 1/2 to 5 1/2 points.

== Format ==
The Ryder Cup is a match play event, with each match worth one point. From 1927 through 1959, the format consisted of 4 foursome (alternate shot) matches on the first day and 8 singles matches on the second day, for a total of 12 points. Therefore, 6 1/2 points were required to win the Cup. All matches were played to a maximum of 36 holes.

== Teams ==
The British team was selected by the tournament committee of the P.G.A. with power to add to their numbers. In January 1953 Henry Cotton was chosen as captain and was co-opted onto the selection committee. In mid-August a group of 17 was announced from which the team would be chosen. This consisted of the eventual team of 10 plus Cotton, Tom Haliburton, Jack Hargreaves, Sam King, Arthur Lees, Norman Sutton and Charlie Ward. John Jacobs was later added to the list. Cotton withdrew from consideration for medical reasons. The P.G.A. arranged a series of trial matches at Wentworth starting on 23 September with the team announced on 26 September.

Team Great Britain
Name	Age	Previous Ryder Cups	Matches	W–L–H	Winning percentage
(England) Henry Cotton	46	Non-playing captain
(Scotland) Jimmy Adams	42	3	6	2–4–0	33.33
(England) Peter Alliss	22	0	Rookie
(Republic of Ireland) Harry Bradshaw	39	0	Rookie
(Scotland) Eric Brown	28	0	Rookie
(Northern Ireland) Fred Daly	41	3	6	1–4–1	25.00
(England) Max Faulkner	37	3	6	1–5–0	16.67
(England) Bernard Hunt	23	0	Rookie
(Scotland) John Panton	36	1	2	0–2–0	0.00
(Wales) Dai Rees	40	4	7	2–4–1	35.71
(England) Harry Weetman	32	1	1	0–1–0	0.00

The American team was announced in early August, after the 1953 All American Open. The 1952 and 1953 winners of the PGA Championship received automatic places. The remaining 8 members of the team were decided using a points-based system. Ben Hogan and Dutch Harrison qualified but declined their invitations. They were replaced Dave Douglas and Fred Haas, the next two in the points list.

Team USA
Name	Age	Previous Ryder Cups	Matches	W–L–H	Winning percentage
Lloyd Mangrum – captain	39	3	6	5–1–0	83.33
Jack Burke Jr.	30	1	2	2–0–0	100.00
Walter Burkemo	34	0	Rookie
Dave Douglas	35	0	Rookie
Fred Haas	37	0	Rookie
Ted Kroll	34	0	Rookie
Cary Middlecoff	32	0	Rookie
Ed Oliver	38	2	4	2–2–0	50.00
Sam Snead	41	4	7	6–1–0	85.71
Jim Turnesa	40	0	Rookie

== Friday's foursome matches ==
In the middle two matches the American pairs won easily after being 8 up and 7 up at lunch. In the first match Douglas and Oliver led by three after three holes of the afternoon round. The British pair reduced the lead to one with six holes to play. Both pairs holes good putts at the 15th but the British pair bogeyed the 16th to be dormie-two. Oliver drove out of bounds at the 17th but the British pair took 6 and the hole was halved. In the final match, Daly and Bradshaw were three up at lunch but lost the first two holes in the afternoon. Daly and Bradshaw's lead increased to 3 at the turn but then the Americans reduced the lead to one. Bradshaw had some luck at the 16th when his drive hit a spectator and the hole was halved. Middlecoff missed a 7-foot putt at the 17th which would have tied the match. The American pair got a 4 at the last but Daly holed from 3 yards to win the match.

	Results
Weetman/Alliss	(United States) 2 & 1	Douglas/Oliver
Brown/Panton	(United States) 8 & 7	Mangrum/Snead
Adams/Hunt	(United States) 7 & 5	Kroll/Burke
Daly/Bradshaw	(United Kingdom) 1 up	Burkemo/Middlecoff
1	Session	3
1	Overall	3

18 hole scores: Douglas/Oliver: 1 up, Mangrum/Snead: 8 up, Kroll/Burke: 7 up, Daly/Bradshaw: 3 up.

== Saturday's singles matches ==
The start was delayed by 80 minutes because of mist. At lunch each side was up in three matches with the other two matches level. Rees was ahead after 12 holes of the afternoon round but lost 2 & 1. Daly was 6 up at lunch and won his match easily. Mangrum had levelled his match against Brown with birdies at the 15th and 16th but Brown finished with two fours to win the match. Snead was 4 up at lunch and increased this to five. However he played the last six holes very badly and Weetman won at the last hole, finishing with two fours.

With Middlecoff and Bradshaw winning their matches, the British team needed 1 1/2 points from the remaining 2 matches to win or a point to tie. The two British players in these matches were 22-year-old Peter Alliss and 23-year-old Bernard Hunt. Alliss had gone 1 up at the 14th but he 3-putted the 15th while Turnesa got down in two from a bunker. Alliss went out of bounds at the 17th to give Turnesa the lead. Turnesa was in the trees at the last and still short of the green in 3. However, Alliss, just off the green in 2, fluffed his chip, and eventually halved the hole in 6, to guarantee that the USA would retain the Ryder Cup. In the last match Hunt had won the 12th, 13th, 16th and 17th to be dormie-one. At the last, Hunt's second shot was in the trees on the right but he managed to get his third shot to the back of the green. He putted to 4 feet and, with Douglas taking 5, he needed to hole the putt to win the match. He missed and so the USA won 6 1/2 to 5 1/2.

	Results
Dai Rees	(United States) 2 & 1	Jack Burke Jr.
Fred Daly	(United Kingdom) 9 & 7	Ted Kroll
Eric Brown	(United Kingdom) 2 up	Lloyd Mangrum
Harry Weetman	(United Kingdom) 1 up	Sam Snead
Max Faulkner	(United States) 3 & 1	Cary Middlecoff
Peter Alliss	(United States) 1 up	Jim Turnesa
Bernard Hunt	halved	Dave Douglas
Harry Bradshaw	(United Kingdom) 3 & 2	Fred Haas
4 1/2	Session	3 1/2
5 1/2	Overall	6 1/2

18 hole scores: Rees v Burke: all square, Daly: 6 up, Brown: 2 up, Snead: 4 up, Middlecoff: 3 up, Turnesa: 1 up, Hunt v Douglas: all square, Bradshaw: 1 up.

== Individual player records ==
Each entry refers to the win–loss–half record of the player.

=== Great Britain ===
Player	Points	Overall	Singles	Foursomes
Jimmy Adams	0	0–1–0	0–0–0	0–1–0
Peter Alliss	0	0–2–0	0–1–0	0–1–0
Harry Bradshaw	2	2–0–0	1–0–0	1–0–0
Eric Brown	1	1–1–0	1–0–0	0–1–0
Fred Daly	2	2–0–0	1–0–0	1–0–0
Max Faulkner	0	0–1–0	0–1–0	0–0–0
Bernard Hunt	0.5	0–1–1	0–0–1	0–1–0
John Panton	0	0–1–0	0–0–0	0–1–0
Dai Rees	0	0–1–0	0–1–0	0–0–0
Harry Weetman	1	1–1–0	1–0–0	0–1–0

=== United States ===
Player	Points	Overall	Singles	Foursomes
Jack Burke Jr.	2	2–0–0	1–0–0	1–0–0
Walter Burkemo	0	0–1–0	0–0–0	0–1–0
Dave Douglas	1.5	1–0–1	0–0–1	1–0–0
Fred Haas	0	0–1–0	0–1–0	0–0–0
Ted Kroll	1	1–1–0	0–1–0	1–0–0
Lloyd Mangrum	1	1–1–0	0–1–0	1–0–0
Cary Middlecoff	1	1–1–0	1–0–0	0–1–0
Ed Oliver	1	1–0–0	0–0–0	1–0–0
Sam Snead	1	1–1–0	0–1–0	1–0–0
Jim Turnesa	1	1–0–0	1–0–0	0–0–0

== Continental Europe–United States match ==
In January 1953 the PGA of America received an invitation from the European Golf Association to play a match against a team of European professionals. A match was arranged by the EGA and the French Golf Federation, played at Golf de Saint-Cloud, Saint-Cloud, Paris on 6 and 7 October. The match consisted of 5 fourball matches on the first day and 10 singles on the second day, all matches over 18 holes. Originally foursomes matches were planned for the first day but were replaced by fourballs.

Ed Oliver returned to America after the Ryder Cup. He was replaced by PGA officials, Warren Orlick on the first day and Ray Maguire on the second day. The continental europe team was Jean Baptiste Ado, Alfonso Angelini, Georg Bessner, Aldo Casera, Arthur Devulder, Gerard de Wit, Ugo Grappasonni, Marcelino Morcillo, Albert Pélissier and François Saubaber. Ángel Miguel was originally announced in the team but was replaced by Marcelino Morcillo. The team therefore had three players from France and Italy, and one each from Belgium, Germany, the Netherlands and Spain. Auguste Boyer was the non-playing captain. The leading European golfer, Flory Van Donck, did not play. Van Donck had already won four continental open championships in 1953 and two British tournaments. However, the match clashed with the Dunlop Masters which was played on 7 and 8 October. Van Donck was the only continental player competing in the limited field of 20.

The United States led 4–1 after the first day. The Italian pair of Alfonso Angelini and Ugo Grappasonni beat Jim Turnesa and Warren Orlick 2 & 1. On the second day Europe won one match and halved two, giving a final score of 12–3. None of the American Ryder Cup team lost, Europe's only win was by Marcelino Morcillo who beat Ray Maguire. Albert Pélissier halved his match against Walter Burkemo while Grappasonni also halved against Lloyd Mangrum.

From 1954 to 1958 the EGA arranged a similar match between the British Isles and the Rest of Europe for the Joy Cup.
