= Little Aston Golf Club =

18 hole members golf club in Sutton Coldfield, England

- Location in England Location in Staffordshire
- 52°35′44.0″N 1°52′0.7″W

Club information
- Location: Sutton Coldfield, Birmingham, England
- Established: 1908
- Type: Private
- Total holes: 18
- Tournaments: English Amateur; Brabazon Trophy; British Ladies Amateur; British Masters; Jacques Léglise Trophy; Schweppes PGA Close Championship; Swallow-Penfold Tournament; Daks Tournament; Boys Amateur Championship; Dunlop Tournament
- Website: http://www.littleastongolf.co.uk
- Designed by: Harry Vardon
- Par: 72
- Length: 6813
- Course rating: 74

Little Aston Golf Club is an 18 hole members golf club located within the Little Aston Park Private Estate in Sutton Coldfield, England which has hosted a variety of leading professional and amateur tournaments including the Schweppes PGA Close Championship and the Brabazon Trophy.

== History ==
Little Aston Golf Club was founded in 1908 when Harry Vardon was commissioned to convert 136 acres of land into the golf course, the design commissioned by Harry Vardon remains largely unchanged to date. The land had previously formed part of the estate of Little Aston Hall.

Little Aston hosted its first significant tournament when it hosted the English Amateur in 1927 and hosted its first professional tournament at the 1951 Dunlop Tournament. Subsequently the club has gone on to host the Schweppes PGA Close Championship the forerunner to the European Tour's flagship event in 1962 and the Brabazon Trophy on 3 occasions from 1970 to 1994.

In more recent years the course has been lengthened with addition of several new championship tees to continue to remain a competitive challenge in light of the changes in distances achieved by modern player and equipment.

== Former players ==
- (England) Nick Littlehales (1978-1983)

== Course and scorecard ==
There is a single 18 hole course at Little Aston Golf Course which takes the form of a parkland course, from the championship tees the course measures 6,813 yards.

Tee	Rating/Slope	1	2	3	4	5	6	7	8	9	Out	10	11	12	13	14	15	16	17	18	In	Total
Par	Men's	4	4	5	4	3	4	4	4	3	35	4	4	5	3	4	5	4	4	4	37	72
SI	Men's	13	5	7	1	15	9	4	11	18		3	10	6	17	16	2	8	14	12
Championship	74	392	446	514	317	161	423	362	410	193	3218	444	393	485	183	342	549	419	380	400	3595	6813
Medal		392	446	503	317	161	423	362	392	193	3189	432	393	485	161	326	549	398	380	391	3515	6704
Yellow		392	410	490	314	153	410	346	376	178	3055	426	363	485	156	300	517	375	370	374	3365	6420
Par	Women's	4	5	5	4	3	4	4	4	3	36	5	4	5	3	4	5	4	4	4	38	74
SI	Women's	13	5	7	9	15	1	4	11	18		3	10	6	17	16	2	8	14	12
Red		368	392	442	271	137	385	313	342	143	2793	391	296	437	130	262	473	313	339	328	2969	5762

All distances given in yards

== Tournaments hosted ==
=== Boys Amateur Championship ===
Little Aston first hosted the Boys Amateur Championship in 1994 and subsequently hosted the matchplay tournament again in 2008 with the following results:

No.	Year	Champion	Runner-up	Score
1	1994	(England) Christopher Smith	(England) Chris Rodgers	2 & 1
2	2008	(Portugal) Pedro Figueiredo	(Scotland) Fraser McKenna	39th Hole

=== Brabazon Trophy ===
Little Aston hosted the Men's Open Amateur Stroke Play Championship for the Brabazon Trophy on 3 occasions between 1970 and 1994 with the following results:

No.	Year	Champion	Score
1	1970	Peter Moody	296
2	1979	D. Long	291
3	1994	(England) Gary Harris	280

=== British Ladies Amateur Golf Championship ===
The club hosted the British Ladies Amateur Golf Championship in 1998 with Kim Rostron of England beating Gwladys Nocera of France 4&3 in the final.

=== British Masters ===
The club has hosted the British Masters on 5 occasions between 1947 and 1969, for sponsorship reasons the tournament was known as the Dunlop Masters during this period and the results were:

No.	Year	Champion	Score	Runner-up	Ref
1	1947	(England) Arthur Lees	283	(Australia) Norman Von Nida	
2	1955	(Republic of Ireland) Harry Bradshaw	277	(England) Henry Cotton	
3	1958	(England) Harry Weetman	276	(South Africa) Bobby Locke	
4	1963	(England) Bernard Hunt	282	(England) Ralph Moffitt	
5	1969	(South Africa) Cobie Legrange	281	(England) Peter Butler	

=== Daks Tournament ===
Little Aston hosted the Daks Tournament on the European circuit in 1954 with Peter Alliss winning the event.

=== Dunlop Tournament ===
In 1951 Little Aston co-hosted the Dunlop Tournament with Sutton Coldfield Golf Club with Charlie Ward of South Africa winning the event.

=== English Amateur ===
The club has hosted the English Amateur on 4 occasions between 1927 and 2010 (co-hosting with Sutton Coldfield Golf Club in 2010), with the following results:

No.	Year	Winner	Runner-up	Score
1	1927	Philip Perkins	J. B. Beddard	2 & 1
2	1948	Alan Helm	H. J. Roberts	2 & 1
3	1985	Roger Winchester	P. R. Robinson	1 hole
4	2010	Tommy Fleetwood	Warren Harmston	1 hole

=== Jacques Léglise Trophy ===
Little Aston hosted the 1994 Jacques Léglise Trophy amateur boys' team golf competition between Great Britain & Ireland and the Continent of Europe, with Great Britain and Ireland winning 12½ – 2½.

=== Schweppes PGA Close Championship ===
In 1962 the club hosted the Schweppes PGA Close Championship which is now the European Tour flagship BMW PGA Championship, the winner was Peter Alliss with a score of 287.

=== Swallow-Penfold Tournament ===
Little Aston hosted the Swallow-Penfold Tournament in 1966 with Welsh golfer Dave Thomas winning the event.

== See also ==
List of golf courses in the United Kingdom
