= Penfold Tournament =

Former British PGA golf tournament

Tournament information
- Location: Worthing, England
- Established: 1932
- Course: Hill Barn Golf Club
- Par: 70
- Tour: European Tour
- Format: Stroke play
- Prize fund: £12,000
- Month played: May
- Final year: 1974

Tournament record score
- Aggregate: 266 Ken Bousfield (1961)
- To par: −8 Tommy Horton (1974)

Final champion
- (England) Tommy Horton
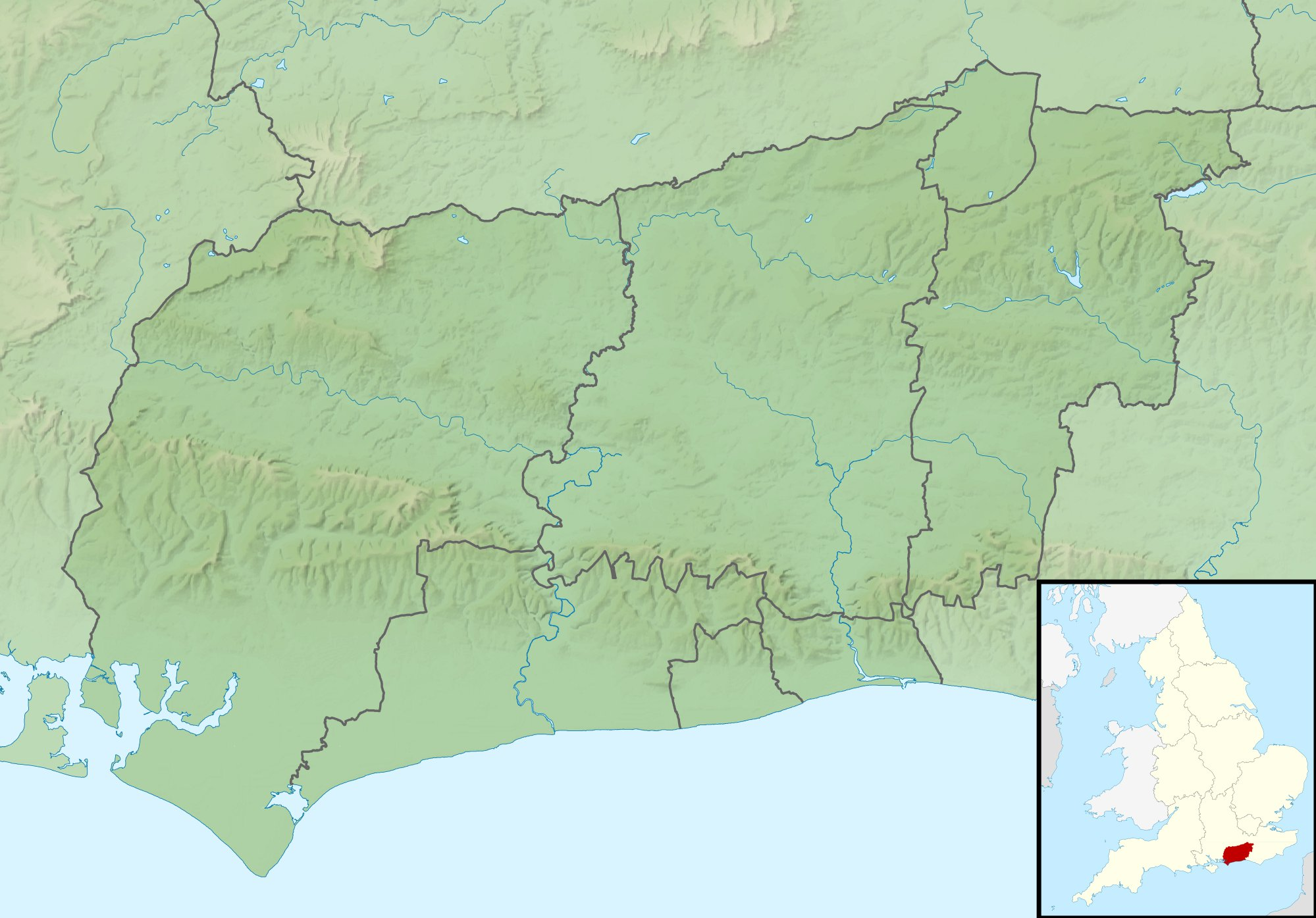
- Location in England Location in West Sussex

The Penfold Tournament was a golf tournament on the British PGA tournament circuit. Since the circuit later evolved into the European Tour, the tournament is recognised as an official European Tour event from 1972. It was played between 1932 and 1935, and from 1946 to 1974 at a variety of courses in the United Kingdom. The tournament was sponsored by Penfold Golf and was often played at coastal resorts, whose councils shared the costs. In 1974, Penfold were taken over by Colgate-Palmolive and continued their sponsorship through the Penfold PGA Championship from 1975 to 1977.

It was generally played as an individual stroke play event. In 1949 there were two qualifying rounds, after which the leading 32 were drawn into 16 pairs, who then played four rounds of knock-out foursomes match play to determine the winning pair. In 1950, it was played at mixed-team match play. 32 professional men and 32 ladies qualified over 36 holes and were then drawn into pairs. These pairs played five rounds of knock-out foursomes match play to determine the winning pair, the final being over 36 holes. It returned to an individual stroke play format for 1951. From 1952 to 1954, it was played at 36 holes of stroke play followed by match play for the top 32 players.

In 1955 Penfold combined their sponsorship with Swallow Raincoats who had supported the Swallow-Harrogate Tournament in 1953 and 1954. The new tournament was known as the Swallow-Penfold Tournament and had a first prize of £1,000 and total prize money of £4,000. The new event had a 72-hole stroke play format. Swallow dropped their sponsorship after the 1966 event but the tournament continued with £4,000 prize money in 1967. Prize money increased to £8,000 in 1971 and finally £12,000 in 1974.

== Winners ==
Year	Winner	Score	To par	Margin of victory	Runner(s)-up	Winner's share (£)	Venue	Ref.
Penfold Tournament
1974	(England) Tommy Horton	272	−8	1 stroke	(England) Peter Tupling	2,000	Hill Barn	
Penfold-Bournemouth Tournament
1973	(Northern Ireland) Eddie Polland	281	−3	2 strokes	(England) Doug Sewell	1,500	Queens Park	
1972	(England) Peter Oosterhuis	285	+1	Playoff	(Republic of Ireland) Christy O'Connor Jnr	1,500	Queens Park	
1971	(England) Neil Coles	284		4 strokes	(England) Stuart Brown (Scotland) Gordon Cunningham (England) Doug Sewell (Scotland) Ronnie Shade	1,500	Queens Park	
Penfold Tournament
1970	(England) Bernard Hunt (2)	271		2 strokes	(England) Neil Coles	750	Hill Barn	
1969	(England) Alex Caygill	278		2 strokes	(Republic of Ireland) Christy O'Connor Snr	750	Hill Barn	
1968	(England) Peter Butler (2)	281		Playoff	(Wales) Dave Thomas	750	Maesdu	
1967	(England) John Cockin	275		Playoff	(Australia) Stan Peach	750	Blackpool North Shore	
Swallow-Penfold Tournament
1966	(Wales) Dave Thomas	281		1 stroke	(England) Bernard Hunt	750	Little Aston	
1965	(Spain) Ángel Miguel	287		Playoff	(England) Lionel Platts	750	Pannal	
1964	(England) Peter Alliss	293		1 stroke	(England) Alex Caygill (England) Hedley Muscroft	750	Maesdu	
1963	(England) Bernard Hunt	272		9 strokes	(England) Peter Butler	1,000	Belleisle	
1962	(England) Harry Weetman (4)	280		3 strokes	(Scotland) Eric Brown	950	Maesdu; North Wales	
1961	(England) Ken Bousfield	266		6 strokes	(England) Bernard Hunt	950	Stoneham; Southampton Municipal	
1960	(England) Harry Weetman (3)	271		2 strokes	(Republic of Ireland) Christy O'Connor Snr (Australia) Peter Thomson	1,000	Copt Heath; Olton	
1959	(England) Peter Butler	280		1 stroke	(England) Harry Weetman	1,000	The Royal Burgess	
1958	(England) Harry Weetman (2)	289		Playoff	(Republic of Ireland) Harry Bradshaw	1,000	Prestwick	
1957	(England) Harry Weetman	270		3 strokes	(England) Peter Alliss (Italy) Alfonso Angelini (South Africa) Harold Henning (Belgium) Flory Van Donck	1,000	Glasgow	
1956	(England) Eric Lester	275		1 stroke	(England) Max Faulkner	1,000	The Royal Burgess	
1955	(Republic of Ireland) Christy O'Connor Snr	292		2 strokes	(Scotland) Eric Brown (England) Syd Scott	1,000	Southport and Ainsdale	
Penfold Tournament
1954	(England) Henry Cotton	5 and 4			(England) John Jacobs	400		
1953	(England) Arthur Lees (2)	2 up			(England) Ken Bousfield	400		
1952	(Scotland) Eric Brown	6 and 5			(Scotland) Laurie Ayton Jnr	500		
Penfold-Bournemouth Festival of Britain Tournament
1951	(England) Arthur Lees	278		2 strokes	(England) Sam King	650	Queens Park; Meyrick Park	
Penfold Tournament
1950	(England) Norman Sutton (2) and (England) Joan Gee	1 up			(England) Sam King and (England) Audrey Barrett			
1949	(England) John Burton (2) and (England) Max Faulkner	1 up			(England) Dick Burton and (Belgium) Flory Van Donck	200 (each)		
1948	(Northern Ireland) Fred Daly	273		3 strokes	(England) Ken Bousfield (Wales) Dai Rees	200	Gleneagles	
1947	(Wales) Dai Rees (Australia) Norman Von Nida (England) Reg Whitcombe (2)	270		Title shared		120 (each)	Stoke Poges	
1946	(England) Norman Sutton	283		2 strokes	(Scotland) Jimmy Adams	200	Sutton Coldfield	
1940–1945: No tournament due to World War II
1935–1939: No tournament
Penfold-Fairhaven Tournament
1934	(England) Reg Whitcombe	284		Playoff	(England) Mark Seymour	150	Fairhaven	
Penfold-Porthcawl Tournament
1933	(England) John Burton	292		2 strokes	(England) Reg Whitcombe	150	Royal Porthcawl	
1932	(England) Percy Alliss	278		1 stroke	(England) Alf Padgham	150	Royal Porthcawl	
