= 1961 Canada Cup =

Coordinates: 18.472°N 66.307°W

Tournament information
- Dates: June 1–4
- Location: Dorado, Puerto Rico
- Course: Dorado Beach
- Format: 72 holes stroke play combined score

Statistics
- Par: 72
- Length: 7,115 yards (6,506 m)
- Field: 33 two-man teams
- Cut: None
- Prize fund: US$6,300
- Winner's share: $2,000 team $1,000 individual

Champion
- United States; Jimmy Demaret & Sam Snead
- 560 (−16)
- Location in the Caribbean Location in Puerto Rico

The 1961 Canada Cup took place June 1–4 at Dorado Beach in Dorado, Puerto Rico. It was the ninth Canada Cup event, which became the World Cup in 1967. The tournament was a 72-hole stroke play team event with 33 teams. These were the same teams that had competed in 1960 but without Central Africa and with the addition of Paraguay, Puerto Rico, Uruguay and Venezuela. Each team consisted of two players from a country. The combined score of each team determined the team results. The American team of Jimmy Demaret and Sam Snead won by 12 strokes over the Australian team of Kel Nagle and Peter Thomson. The individual competition was won by Sam Snead, with a tournament record score of 272, finishing eight shots ahead of Peter Thomson.

== Teams ==
Country	Players
Argentina	Fidel de Luca and Leopoldo Ruiz
Australia	Kel Nagle and Peter Thomson
Belgium	Donald Swaelens and Flory Van Donck
Brazil	José Maria Gonzalez and Mário Gonzalez
Canada	Al Balding and Al Johnston
Chile	Anisio Araya and Enrique Orellana
China	Chen Ching-Po and Hsieh Yung-yo
Colombia	Alfonso Bohórquez and Miguel Sala
Denmark	Henning Kristensen and Carl Paulsen
Egypt	Cherif El-Sayed Cherif and Mohamed Said Moussa
England	Peter Alliss and Brian Bamford
France	Jean Garaïalde and François Saubaber
Ireland	Norman Drew and Christy O'Connor Snr
Italy	Alfonso Angelini and Carlo Grappasonni
Japan	Tadashi Kitsuta and Torakichi Nakamura
Mexico	Roberto De Vicenzo and Juan Antonio Estrada (a)
Netherlands	Cees Cramer and Gerard de Wit
New Zealand	Michael Busk and Ernie Southerden
Paraguay	Luis Boschian and Elcido Nari
Peru	Eugenio Dunezat and Wilfredo Uculmana
Philippines	Ben Arda and Celestino Tugot
Portugal	Henrique Paulino and Fernando Pina
Puerto Rico	Pete Cooper and Chi-Chi Rodríguez
Scotland	Eric Brown and John Panton
South Africa	Harold Henning and Retief Waltman
Spain	Sebastián Miguel and Ramón Sota
Sweden	Harry Karlsson and Arne Werkell
Switzerland	Jacky Bonvin and Otto Schoepfer
United States	Jimmy Demaret and Sam Snead
Uruguay	Juan Sereda and Pascual Viola
Venezuela	Francisco Gonzales and Teobaldo Perez
Wales	Dai Rees and Dave Thomas
West Germany	Hans Bessner and Willi Jersombeck

(a) - denotes amateur

The Canadian Stan Leonard, American Arnold Palmer and South African Gary Player withdrew from the event. The Canada Cup was played at the same time as the Memphis Open, an official event on the 1961 PGA Tour. Under a PGA Tour rule, the three, as winners of official PGA Tour events in the previous 12 months, were unable to play in non-tour events where they clashed with official events. The sponsors of the Memphis Open refused to allow the three to play in the Canada Cup with the result that the players withdrew from both events. They were replaced by Al Johnston, Jimmy Demaret and Harold Henning.

== Scores ==
Team

Place	Country	Score	To par	Money (US$)
1	United States	140-137-144-139=560	−16	2,000
2	Australia	143-140-146-143=572	−4	1,000
3	Canada	147-142-151-139=579	+3	800
4	Ireland	147-151-144-140=582	+6	400
5	Philippines	145-143-148-149=585	+9	
6	Wales	144-149-154-140=587	+11	
7	Puerto Rico	149-149-146-145=589	+13	
8	South Africa	149-147-146-149=591	+15	
9	Argentina	146-151-146-150=593	+17	
T10	Belgium	151-146-150-147=594	+18	
T10	China	147-148-148-151=594	+18	
T12	Japan	154-146-147-148=595	+19	
T12	Scotland	147-150-151-147=595	+19	
14	Mexico	147-152-150-147=596	+20	
15	England	148-153-149-149=599	+23	
T16	Colombia	146-157-153-145=601	+25	
T16	Spain	148-150-153-150=601	+25	
18	Egypt	146-150-158-150=604	+28	
19	France	151-154-148-152=605	+29	
20	Brazil	149-155-156-150=610	+34	
21	Italy	152-158-151-152=613	+37	
22	Venezuela	155-151-160-153=619	+43	
23	New Zealand	161-157-157-150=625	+49	
24	Netherlands	156-155-156-161=628	+52	
25	Uruguay	154-158-161-157=630	+54	
26	Sweden	160-156-164-153=633	+57	
T27	Chile	165-160-153-156=634	+58	
T27	Peru	169-152-153-160=634	+58	
T27	Switzerland	158-155-162-159=634	+58	
30	West Germany	156-162-160-164=642	+66	
31	Denmark	162-159-164-158=643	+67	
32	Paraguay	170-165-155-159=649	+73	
33	Portugal	162-164-163-166=655	+79	

International Trophy

Place	Player	Country	Score	To par	Money (US$)
1	Sam Snead	United States	67-67-70-68=272	−16	1,000
2	Peter Thomson	Australia	69-71-70-70=280	−8	500
3	Christy O'Connor Snr	Ireland	73-72-68-69=282	−6	400
4	Al Balding	Canada	69-70-75-69=283	−5	200
5	Ben Arda	Philippines	69-69-72-76=286	−2	
T6	Peter Alliss	England	72-72-71-73=288	E	
T6	Jimmy Demaret	United States	73-70-74-71=288	E	
8	Chi-Chi Rodríguez	Puerto Rico	74-73-72-71=290	+2	
T9	Kel Nagle	Australia	74-69-76-73=292	+4	
T9	Dave Thomas	Wales	71-76-77-68=292	+4	
