= Dunlop Tournament (United Kingdom) =

Tournament information
- Location: United Kingdom
- Established: 1949
- Month played: May
- Final year: 1961

Final champion
- Kel Nagle

The Dunlop Tournament was a professional golf tournament played in the United Kingdom from 1949 to 1961. It was replaced by the "Dunlop-Southport Tournament". It was sponsored by Dunlop. The last event was played in 1961 when Dunlop withdrew their funding, although they continued to support the Dunlop Masters. The tournament was generally played in early May, except in 1951 when it was played in April and 1961 which was played in late June and early July. and was played over 72 holes of stroke play. From 1950 to 1958 the tournament was played over 90 holes. The first two rounds were played on two different courses after which there was cut and the remaining three rounds were played on the main course.

== Winners ==
Year	Winner	Venue	Score	Margin of victory	Runner(s)-up	Winner's share (£)	Ref
1949	(England) Max Faulkner	Wentworth Club	287	2 strokes	(England) Sam King	350	
1950	(South Africa) Bobby Locke	Wentworth Club	353	2 strokes	(England) Charlie Ward	350	
1951	(England) Charlie Ward	Little Aston Golf Club (and Sutton Coldfield Golf Club)	359	1 stroke	(Scotland) Jimmy Adams	350	
1952	(England) Max Faulkner	Sunningdale Golf Club	345	7 strokes	(Scotland) Tom Haliburton	350	
1953	(England) Henry Cotton	Wentworth Club	353	5 strokes	(Wales) Dai Rees	350	
1954	(South Africa) Bobby Locke	Southport and Ainsdale Golf Club (and Hesketh Golf Club)	361	1 stroke	(Argentina) Antonio Cerdá	350	
1955	(England) Peter Alliss	Wentworth Club	359	1 stroke	(Scotland) Eric Brown	500	
1956	(South Africa) Gary Player	Sunningdale Golf Club	338	2 strokes	(England) Arthur Lees	500	
1957	(England) Ken Bousfield	Southport and Ainsdale Golf Club (and Hesketh Golf Club)	353	2 strokes	(England) Syd Scott	500	
1958	(Australia) Peter Thomson	Wentworth Club	348	3 strokes	(South Africa) Harold Henning	500	
1959	(England) Peter Alliss	Royal Lytham & St Annes Golf Club	280	1 stroke	(England) Henry Cotton (Wales) Dai Rees	600	
1960	(Scotland) Eric Brown (England) Ralph Moffitt	Gleneagles Hotel	273	Tie			
1961	(Australia) Kel Nagle	Notts Golf Club	277	2 strokes	(Australia) Frank Phillips	1000	
