= Sprite Tournament =

Tournament information
- Location: Croydon, Surrey, England
- Established: 1959
- Course(s): Selsdon Park Golf Club
- Month played: July
- Final year: 1960

Final champion
- Harold Henning

Location in England

The Sprite Tournament was a professional golf tournament played at Selsdon Park Golf Club, Surrey, England in 1959 and 1960. The 1960 event was called the Sprite International.

In the 1959 event the first 36 holes were also played as a pro-am better ball. The 1960 event was preceded by a 27-hole pro-am better-ball event.

== Winners ==
Year	Winner	Country	Score	Margin of victory	Runner(s)-up	Winner's share (£)	Ref
Sprite Tournament
1959	Ken Bousfield	England	275	1 stroke	(Scotland) John Panton	500	
Sprite International
1960	Harold Henning	South Africa	280	Playoff (1st hole)	(England) Peter Alliss (South Africa) Gary Player	500	
