= Sebastián Miguel =

Spanish golfer

Personal information
- Full name: Sebastián Miguel
- Nationality: Spain
- Born: 7 February 1931 Madrid, Spain
- Died: 15 July 2006 (aged 75) Torremolinos, Spain

Career
- Sport: Golf
- Status: Professional
- Former tour: European Tour
- Professional wins: 10

Best results in major championships
- Masters Tournament: CUT: 1961, 1962, 1964
- PGA Championship: DNP
- U.S. Open: DNP
- The Open Championship: T6: 1965

Sebastián Miguel (7 February 1931 – 15 July 2006) was a Spanish professional golfer.

== Career ==
Miguel was born in Madrid. He won several major tournaments around Europe during the 1950s and 60s, including the Spanish Open in 1954, 1960 and 1967 and the Portuguese Open in 1959. He also won the Spanish Professionals Championship four times.

Miguel represented his country in the World Cup on eleven occasions. He finished in runners-up spot in the team event twice, in 1958 partnered by his brother Ángel, who also had a successful professional career, and again in 1963 partnered by Ramón Sota.

Miguel performed well in The Open Championship, finishing in the top ten four times, with a best of tied for 6th place in 1967. In the 1961 Open he tied for 14th alongside his brother. He also played in the U.S. Masters three times, but never made the cut.

== Professional wins (10) ==
- 1954 Spanish Open
- 1955 Monte Carlo Open
- 1958 Spanish Professionals Championship
- 1959 Portuguese Open
- 1960 Spanish Open
- 1963 Open de Castilla
- 1966 Spanish Professionals Championship
- 1967 Spanish Open, Spanish Professionals Championship
- 1968 Spanish Professionals Championship

== Results in major championships ==
Tournament	1955	1956	1957	1958	1959	1960	1961	1962	1963	1964	1965	1966	1967	1968
Masters Tournament							CUT	CUT		CUT				
The Open Championship	CUT	T40	T15	T26	CUT	T26	T14	T12	T9	CUT	T8	T8	T6	T21

Note: Miguel only played in the Masters Tournament and The Open Championship.

Top 10
Did not play

CUT = missed the half-way cut
"T" indicates a tie for a place

== Team appearances ==
- World Cup (representing Spain): 1954, 1955, 1956, 1958, 1959, 1960, 1961, 1963, 1966, 1967, 1968
- Joy Cup (representing the Rest of Europe): 1954, 1956, 1958
