= 1956 Canada Cup =

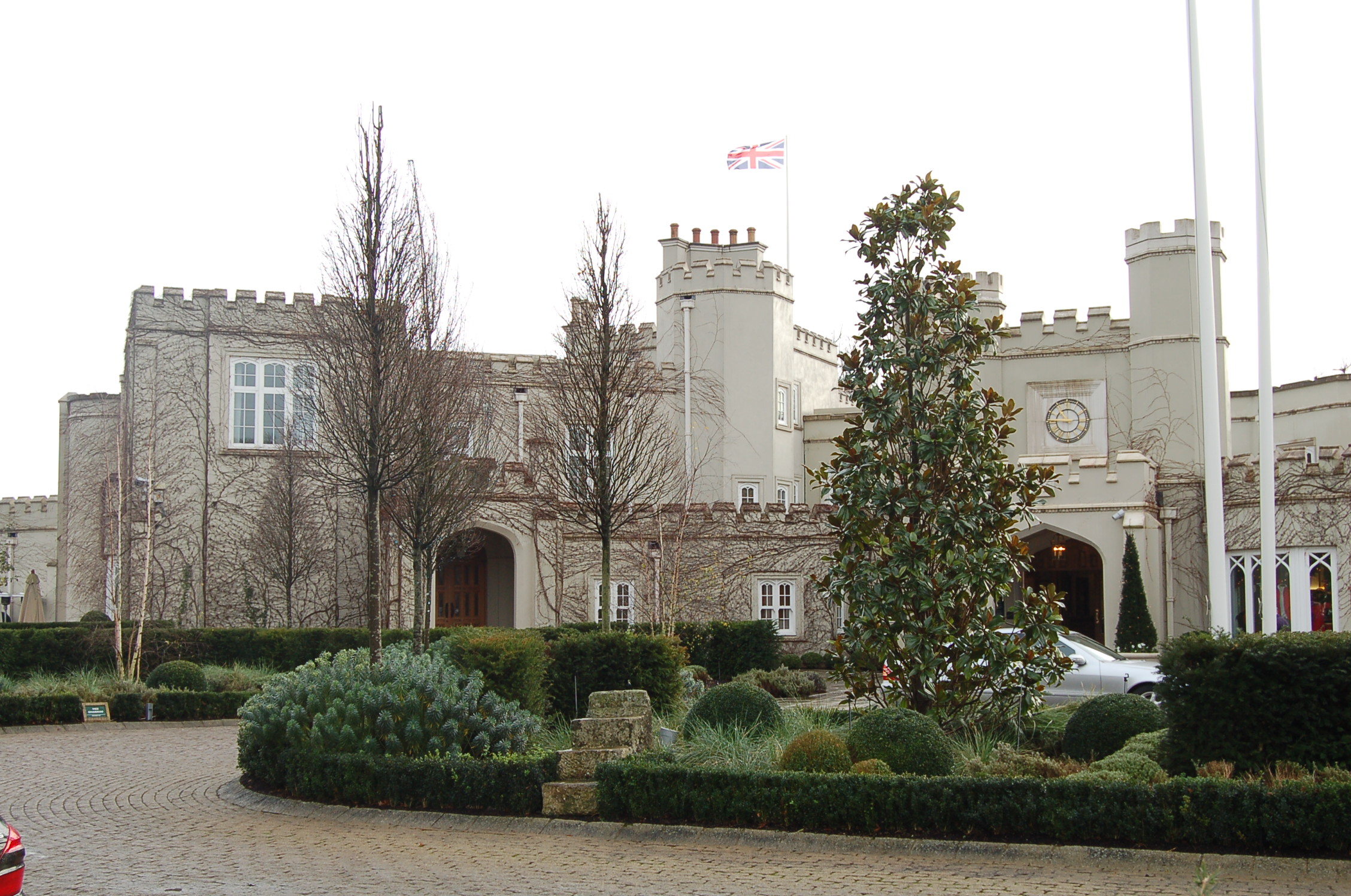
- Wentworth Club

Tournament information
- Dates: 24–26 June
- Location: Virginia Water, Surrey, England; 51.400°N 0.590°W
- Courses: Wentworth Club; West Course
- Format: 72 holes stroke play combined score

Statistics
- Par: 71
- Length: 6,900 yards (6,300 m)
- Field: 29 two-man teams
- Cut: 20 teams and ties

Champion
- United States; Ben Hogan & Sam Snead
- 567 (−1)

Location map
- Location in England Location in Surrey

The 1956 Canada Cup took place 24–26 June on the West Course at the Wentworth Club in Virginia Water, Surrey, England. It was the fourth Canada Cup event, which became the World Cup in 1967. The tournament was a 72-hole stroke play team event with 29 teams. The Scandinavian team that had competed in 1954 and 1955 was replaced by teams from Denmark and Sweden, while there were new teams from Chinese Taipei, Portugal and South Korea. Each team consisted of two players from a country. The combined score of each team determined the team results. 18 holes were played on the first two days with 36 holes played on the final day. Because of the time taken to play each round, a cut was introduced after the second day, with only the leading 20 teams competing on the final day. An 18-hole consolation event was held for the remaining 9 teams. There was provision for an individual in one of these 9 teams to complete the 72 holes if they were well-placed after the second day.

The American team of Ben Hogan and Sam Snead won by 14 strokes over the South African team of Bobby Locke and Gary Player. The individual competition was won by Hogan, five shots ahead of Roberto De Vicenzo.

== Teams ==
Country	Players
Argentina	Enrique Bertolino and Martin Pose
Australia	Peter Thomson and Norman Von Nida
Belgium	Arthur Devulder and Flory Van Donck
Brazil	Mário Gonzalez and Luis Rapisarda
Canada	Al Balding and Stan Leonard
Chile	Manuel Morales and Alberto Salas
China	Chen Ching-Po and Lu Liang-Huan
Colombia	Julio Polania and Raúl Posse
Denmark	Henry Aafeldt and Carl Paulsen
Egypt	Cherif El-Sayed Cherif and Hassan Hassanein
England	Ken Bousfield and Harry Weetman
France	Roger Cotton and François Saubaber
Ireland	Harry Bradshaw and Christy O'Connor Snr
Italy	Alfonso Angelini and Ugo Grappasonni
Japan	Yoshiro Hayashi and Michio Ishii
Mexico	Percy Clifford and Roberto De Vicenzo
Netherlands	Gerard de Wit and Piet Witte
New Zealand	Frank Buckler and Ernie Southerden
Philippines	Ben Arda and Celestino Tugot
Portugal	M Lourenco and J Feliciano Da Silva
Scotland	Eric Brown and John Panton
South Africa	Bobby Locke and Gary Player
South Korea	Park Myeong-chul and Yun Duk-choon
Spain	Ángel Miguel and Sebastián Miguel
Sweden	Harry Karlsson and Arne Werkell
Switzerland	Jacky Bonvin and Otto Schoepfer
United States	Ben Hogan and Sam Snead
Wales	Dai Rees and Dennis Smalldon
West Germany	Friedrich Becker and Georg Bessner

Note: De Vicenzo was representing Mexico, having played for Argentina in the three previous Canada Cup events.

== Scores ==
Team

Place	Country	Score	To par
1	United States	144-142-145-136=567	−1
2	South Africa	145-145-145-146=581	+13
3	Canada	144-139-145-155=583	+15
T4	England	152-141-152-141=586	+18
T4	Japan	152-151-147-136=586	+18
6	Wales	143-145-156-143=587	+19
7	Scotland	148-148-149-144=589	+21
8	Belgium	145-145-154-151=595	+27
9	Mexico	143-151-150-154=598	+30
T10	Australia	142-152-162-145=601	+33
T10	Ireland	150-153-147-151=601	+33
T10	Spain	151-147-155-148=601	+33
13	France	151-148-151-152=602	+34
14	Philippines	151-148-156-150=605	+37
15	Colombia	150-149-151-159=609	+41
16	Italy	152-146-155-157=610	+42
17	Argentina	151-155-153-153=612	+44
18	Netherlands	151-150-156-157=614	+46
19	Egypt	155-147-151-168=621	+53
20	Switzerland	151-154-161-163=629	+61
21	New Zealand	151-159=310	
T22	Chile	152-165=317	
T22	China	160-157=317	
24	South Korea	160-160=320	
25	Sweden	161-160=321	
26	West Germany	166-156=322	
27	Portugal	163-163=326	
28	Brazil	163-166=329	
29	Denmark	166-167=333	

International Trophy

Place	Player	Country	Score	To par
1	Ben Hogan	United States	68-69-72-68=277	−7
2	Roberto De Vicenzo	Mexico	69-72-67-74=282	−2
3	Flory Van Donck	Belgium	71-67-73-72=283	−1
4	Dai Rees	Wales	74-71-72-67=284	E
5	Bobby Locke	South Africa	71-72-72-70=285	+1
6	Stan Leonard	Canada	69-67-71-79=286	+2
7	Michio Ishii	Japan	71-76-74-68=289	+5
8	Sam Snead	United States	76-73-73-68=290	+6
9	Ken Bousfield	England	76-71-76-68=291	+7
10	Eric Brown	Scotland	76-73-75-69=293	+9
