= Chen Ching-Po =

Taiwanese professional golfer (1931–2025)

Personal information
- Nationality: Taiwan
- Born: 1 October 1931 Tamsui, Taiwan, Empire of Japan
- Died: 14 January 2025 (aged 93)
- Height: 1.70 m (5 ft 7 in)
- Weight: 77 kg (170 lb; 12.1 st)

Career
- Sport: Golf
- Status: Professional
- Professional wins: 16

Best results in major championships
- Masters Tournament: T15: 1963
- PGA Championship: DNP
- U.S. Open: DNP
- The Open Championship: T33: 1956

Chen Ching-Po (1 October 1931 – 14 January 2025) was a Taiwanese professional golfer. He represented Taiwan in 11 successive Canada Cup tournaments from 1956 to 1966 and won the Japan Open Golf Championship in 1959.

Chen was described as the "Ben Hogan of Asia" by Gene Sarazen due to the similarities between their swings.

Chen moved to Japan in 1959 and naturalized as a Japanese citizen in 1978.

Chen died from sepsis on 14 January 2025, at the age of 93.

== Professional wins (16) ==
=== Asia Golf Circuit wins (1) ===
| No. | Date | Tournament | Winning score | Margin of victory | Runner-up |
|---|---|---|---|---|---|
| 1 | 7 Apr 1968 | Yomiuri International | −5 (68-75-68-72=283) | 2 strokes | (Japan) Tomoo Ishii |

=== Other wins (11) ===
- 1959 Japan Open Golf Championship
- 1960 White Bear Cup
- 1962 Kanto Open, White Bear Cup
- 1964 Kanto Pro Championship, Golf Nippon Series, Champions Tournament
- 1965 Champions Tournament
- 1966 Grand Monarch, Champions Tournament
- 1967 Narashino Million

=== Senior wins (4) ===
- 1981 Japan PGA Senior Championship
- 1982 Kanto PGA Senior Championship
- 1983 Kanto PGA Senior Championship
- 1985 Kanto PGA Senior Championship

== Results in major championships ==
| Tournament | 1956 | 1957 | 1958 | 1959 | 1960 | 1961 | 1962 | 1963 | 1964 | 1965 | 1966 | 1967 | 1968 |
|---|---|---|---|---|---|---|---|---|---|---|---|---|---|
| Masters Tournament | | | | | | | | T15 | T44 | T39 | T22 | T46 | T35 |
| The Open Championship | T33 | | | | | | | | | | | | |

Did not play

"T" indicates a tie for a place
Note: Chen only played in the Masters Tournament and The Open Championship.

== Team appearances ==
- Canada Cup (representing Chinese Taipei): 1956, 1957, 1958, 1959, 1960, 1961, 1962, 1963, 1964, 1965, 1966
