= 1962 Canada Cup =

Coordinates: 34.486°S 58.533°W

Tournament information
- Dates: 8–11 November
- Location: San Isidro, Buenos Aires, Argentina
- Course: Jockey Club Golf
- Format: 72 holes stroke play combined score

Statistics
- Par: 70
- Length: 6,746 yards (6,169 m)
- Field: 34 two-man teams
- Cut: None
- Prize fund: US$6,300
- Winner's share: $2,000 team $1,000 individual

Champion
- United States; Arnold Palmer & Sam Snead
- 557 (−3)

The 1962 Canada Cup took place 8–11 November at Jockey Club Golf in San Isidro, Buenos Aires, Argentina. It was the 10th Canada Cup event, which became the World Cup in 1967. The tournament was a 72-hole stroke play team event with 34 teams. These were the same teams that had competed in 1961 but without Paraguay and with the addition of Ecuador and Panama. Each team consisted of two players from a country. The combined score of each team determined the team results. The American team of Arnold Palmer and Sam Snead won by two strokes over the Argentine team of Fidel de Luca and Roberto De Vicenzo. The individual competition was won by Roberto De Vicenzo, who finished two shots ahead of Englishman Peter Alliss and Arnold Palmer.

== Teams ==
| Country | Players |
|---|---|
| Argentina | Fidel de Luca and Roberto De Vicenzo |
| Australia | Kel Nagle and Peter Thomson |
| Belgium | Donald Swaelens and Flory Van Donck |
| Brazil | José Maria Gonzalez and Mário Gonzalez |
| Canada | George Knudson and Alvie Thompson |
| Chile | Anisio Araya and Enrique Orellana |
| Colombia | Rogelio González and Miguel Sala |
| Denmark | Henning Kristensen and Carl Paulsen |
| Ecuador | Jose Arequipa and Julio Polania |
| Egypt | Cherif El-Sayed Cherif and Mohamed Said Moussa |
| England | Peter Alliss and Bernard Hunt |
| France | Roger Cotton and Jean Garaïalde |
| West Germany | Herbert Becker and Friedel Schmaderer |
| Ireland | Jimmy Martin and Christy O'Connor Snr |
| Italy | Alfonso Angelini and Ovidio Bolognesi |
| Japan | Tadashi Kitta and Torakichi Nakamura |
| Mexico | Antonio Cerdá and Augustin Martinez |
| Netherlands | Jan Ouderdorp and Piet Witte |
| New Zealand | Bob Charles and Ernie Southerden |
| Panama | Ricardo Jurado and Carlos Rodriguez |
| Peru | Alex Tibbles and Wilfredo Uculmana |
| Philippines | Ben Arda and Celestino Tugot |
| Portugal | Fernando Pina and Manuel Ribeiro |
| Puerto Rico | Charles Beverage and Chi-Chi Rodríguez |
| Scotland | Eric Brown and John Panton |
| South Africa | Denis Hutchinson and Gary Player |
| Spain | Jaime Gallardo and Ángel Miguel |
| Sweden | Åke Bergquist and Harry Karlsson |
| Switzerland | Otto Schoepfer and Ronald Tingley |
| Taiwan | Chen Ching-Po and Lu Liang-Huan |
| United States | Arnold Palmer and Sam Snead |
| Uruguay | José Esmoris and Juan Sereda |
| Venezuela | Francisco Gonzales and Teobaldo Perez |
| Wales | Dai Rees and Dave Thomas |

Cerdá was representing Mexico, having played for Argentina from 1953 to 1957.

== Scores ==
Team

| Place | Country | Score | To par | Money (US$) |
|---|---|---|---|---|
| 1 | United States | 136-137-141-143=557 | −3 | 2,000 |
| 2 | Argentina | 139-138-141-141=559 | −1 | 1,000 |
| 3 | Australia | 142-134-150-143=569 | +9 | 800 |
| 4 | England | 141-143-147-141=572 | +12 | 400 |
| 5 | Brazil | 149-141-153-141=584 | +24 | |
| 6 | France | 146-146-143-150=585 | +25 | |
| 7 | Uruguay | 152-147-147-140=586 | +26 | |
| 8 | Wales | 141-145-147-155=588 | +28 | |
| T9 | Belgium | 149-143-150-147=589 | +29 | |
| T9 | Taiwan | 147-144-144-154=589 | +29 | |
| T9 | Japan | 143-146-154-146=589 | +29 | |
| T12 | Italy | 143-148-147-152=590 | +30 | |
| T12 | South Africa | 142-146-153-149=590 | +30 | |
| 14 | Spain | 149-151-145-148=593 | +33 | |
| 15 | New Zealand | 141-146-151-158=596 | +36 | |
| T16 | Colombia | 150-144-152-152=598 | +38 | |
| T16 | Philippines | 153-148-153-144=598 | +38 | |
| T18 | Egypt | 159-146-147-147=599 | +39 | |
| T18 | Ireland | 147-152-148-152=599 | +39 | |
| 20 | West Germany | 152-151-153-146=602 | +42 | |
| T21 | Chile | 149-149-151-155=604 | +44 | |
| T21 | Mexico | 150-147-153-154=604 | +44 | |
| T23 | Canada | 157-151-150-150=608 | +48 | |
| T23 | Peru | 147-157-158-146=608 | +48 | |
| T23 | Switzerland | 153-144-154-157=608 | +48 | |
| 26 | Venezuela | 153-154-152-150=609 | +49 | |
| 27 | Denmark | 149-151-160-153=613 | +53 | |
| 28 | Netherlands | 146-159-153-157=615 | +55 | |
| 29 | Portugal | 161-156-156-157=630 | +70 | |
| 30 | Panama | 156-162-158-155=631 | +71 | |
| 31 | Sweden | 163-152-165-156=636 | +76 | |
| 32 | Puerto Rico | 153-162-167-165=647 | +87 | |
| 33 | Ecuador | 158-172-166-173=669 | +109 | |
| 34 | Scotland | WD | | |

Eric Brown of Scotland withdrew during the first round.

International Trophy

| Place | Player | Country | Score | To par | Money (US$) |
|---|---|---|---|---|---|
| 1 | Roberto De Vicenzo | Argentina | 71-68-69-68=276 | −4 | 1,000 |
| T2 | Peter Alliss | England | 68-70-72-68=278 | −2 | 450 |
| T2 | Arnold Palmer | United States | 68-72-69-69=278 | −2 | 450 |
| 4 | Sam Snead | United States | 68-65-72-74=279 | −1 | 200 |
| 5 | Alfonso Angelini | Italy | 68-71-68-74=281 | +1 | |
| T6 | Fidel de Luca | Argentina | 68-70-72-73=283 | +3 | |
| T6 | Kel Nagle | Australia | 73-65-77-68=283 | +3 | |
| 8 | Mário Gonzalez | Brazil | 72-72-73-67=284 | +4 | |
| 9 | Gary Player | South Africa | 69-69-76-71=285 | +5 | |
| 10 | Peter Thomson | Australia | 69-69-73-75=286 | +6 | |
