= Aldo Casera =

Italian professional golfer (1920–1999)

Personal information
- Nationality: Italy
- Born: 31 July 1920 Sanremo, Italy
- Died: 1 May 1999 (aged 78) Turin, Italy

Career
- Sport: Golf
- Status: Professional
- Professional wins: 6

Best results in major championships
- Masters Tournament: DNP
- PGA Championship: DNP
- U.S. Open: DNP
- The Open Championship: T38: 1954

Aldo Casera (31 July 1920 – 1 May 1999) was an Italian professional golfer. He was one of the leading Italian golfers of the post-WWII period.

Together with Alfonso Angelini and Ugo Grappasonni they founded the Professional Golfer's Association of Italy in 1962.

== Professional wins (6) ==
- 1948 Italian Open, Italian Native Open
- 1949 Italian Native Open
- 1950 Swiss Open
- 1956 Italian Native Open
- 1965 Lancia d'Oro

== Results in major championships ==
Tournament	1949	1950	1951	1952	1953	1954	1955	1956	1957	1958	1959	1960	1961	1962	1963	1964	1965	1966	1967	1968	1969
The Open Championship	CUT	CUT	CUT		CUT	T38		CUT	CUT									CUT			CUT

Note: Casera only played in The Open Championship.

Did not play

CUT = missed the half-way cut
"T" indicates a tie for a place

== Team appearances ==
- Continental Europe–United States: (representing Continental Europe): 1953
- Canada Cup (representing Italy): 1954, 1958
- Joy Cup (representing the Rest of Europe): 1954, 1955, 1956, 1958
