= 1963 Canada Cup =

Coordinates: 48.852°N 2.037°E

Tournament information
- Dates: 24–28 October
- Location: Saint-Nom-la-Bretèche, France
- Course: Golf de Saint-Nom-la-Bretèche
- Format: 72 holes stroke play combined score shortened to 63 holes

Statistics
- Par: 72
- Length: 6,834 yards (6,249 m)
- Field: 33 two-man teams

Champion
- United States; Jack Nicklaus & Arnold Palmer
- 482 (−22)

The 1963 Canada Cup took place 24–28 October at Golf de Saint-Nom-la-Bretèche in Saint-Nom-la-Bretèche, 30 km west of Paris, France. It was the 11th Canada Cup event, which became the World Cup in 1967. The tournament was a 72-hole stroke play team event with 33 teams, but was shortened to 63 holes. These were the same teams that had competed in 1962 but without Ecuador and Panama and with the addition of Austria. Each team consisted of two players from a country. The combined score of each team determined the team results. Thick fog meant that play was abandoned on the planned final day. Play was extended to Monday but was restricted to 9 holes. The American team of Jack Nicklaus and Arnold Palmer won by three strokes over the Spanish team of Sebastián Miguel and Ramón Sota. This was the sixth team title for the United States in the 11-year history of the event and the fourth in a row. The individual competition was won by Jack Nicklaus, who finished five shots ahead of Sebastián Miguel and South African Gary Player.

== Teams ==
Country	Players
Argentina	Fidel de Luca and Roberto De Vicenzo
Australia	Bruce Crampton and Bruce Devlin
Austria	Alexander Maculan (a) and Klaus Nierlich (a)
Belgium	Donald Swaelens and Flory Van Donck
Brazil	José Maria Gonzalez and Mário Gonzalez
Canada	Al Balding and Stan Leonard
Chile	Enrique Orellana and Alberto Salas
Colombia	Alfonso Bohórquez and Miguel Sala
Denmark	Jorgen Korfitzen and Henning Kristensen
Egypt	Mohamed Abdel Halim and Mohamed Said Moussa
England	Neil Coles and Bernard Hunt
France	Jean Garaïalde and Jean-Claude Harismendy
West Germany	Hans Bessner and Friedel Schmaderer
Ireland	Jimmy Martin and Christy O'Connor Snr
Italy	Alfonso Angelini and Ovidio Bolognesi
Japan	Tomoo Ishii and Tadashi Kitta
Mexico	Hector Alvarez and Antonio Cerdá
Netherlands	Gerard de Wit and Martin Roesink
New Zealand	Frank Buckler and Bob Charles
Peru	Hugo Nari and Wilfredo Uculmana
Philippines	Vic Allin and Ben Arda
Portugal	Henrique Paulino and Fernando Pina
Puerto Rico	David Jimenez and Chi-Chi Rodríguez
Scotland	John Panton and George Will
South Africa	Gary Player and Retief Waltman
Spain	Sebastián Miguel and Ramón Sota
Sweden	Åke Bergquist and Knut Ekberg
Switzerland	Otto Schoepfer and Ronald Tingley
Taiwan	Chen Ching-Po and Hsieh Yung-yo
United States	Jack Nicklaus and Arnold Palmer
Uruguay	José Esmoris and Juan Sereda
Venezuela	Francisco Gonzales and Teobaldo Perez
Wales	Brian Huggett and Dave Thomas

== Scores ==
Team

Place	Country	Score	To par
1	United States	136-142-138-66=482	−22
2	Spain	138-140-138-69=485	−19
3	South Africa	138-139-140-75=492	−12
4	Canada	136-142-144-73=495	−9
5	Australia	143-139-138-77=497	−7
6	Belgium	144-143-146-75=508	+4
7	Italy	145-141-147-76=509	+5
T8	England	150-144-146-72=512	+8
T8	Japan	149-145-143-75=512	+8
T8	Wales	148-145-145-74=512	+8
11	Argentina	145-152-143-74=514	+10
12	France	146-151-146-72=515	+11
T13	Scotland	148-148-145-79=520	+16
T13	Uruguay	153-143-149-75=520	+16
T15	Chile	146-155-144-78=523	+19
T15	New Zealand	151-149-145-78=523	+19
T17	Taiwan	153-150-147-74=524	+20
T17	Puerto Rico	149-147-153-75=524	+20
T19	Brazil	148-154-145-78=525	+21
T19	Egypt	153-144-149-79=525	+21
21	Mexico	147-151-149-80=527	+23
22	Ireland	143-152-157-78=530	+26
T23	Colombia	154-150-153-77=534	+30
T23	Netherlands	153-152-153-76=534	+30
T23	Peru	151-153-153-77=534	+30
26	Switzerland	155-149-156-81=541	+37
27	West Germany	155-156-154-81=546	+42
28	Venezuela	159-152-154-82=547	+43
29	Denmark	156-158-153-89=556	+52
30	Sweden	161-159-157-82=559	+55
31	Austria	154-156-170-82=562	+58
32	Philippines	153-160-166-85=564	+60
33	Portugal	163-162-167-79=571	+67

International Trophy

Place	Player	Country	Score	To par
1	Jack Nicklaus	United States	67-72-66-32=237	−15
T2	Sebastián Miguel	Spain	66-73-70-33=242	−10
T2	Gary Player	South Africa	68-70-67-37=242	−10
4	Ramón Sota	Spain	72-67-68-36=243	−9
T5	Al Balding	Canada	67-71-73-34=245	−7
T5	Bruce Crampton	Australia	72-70-67-36=245	−7
T5	Arnold Palmer	United States	69-70-72-34=245	−7
8	Chi-Chi Rodríguez	Puerto Rico	71-73-72-32=248	−4
T9	Jean Garaïalde	France	71-72-70-36=249	−3
T9	Tomoo Ishii	Japan	72-70-71-36=249	−3
