= 1954 Canada Cup =

Coordinates: 45.529°N 73.879°W

Tournament information
- Dates: August 20–22
- Location: Laval, Quebec, Canada
- Course: Laval-sur-le-Lac Golf Club
- Format: 72 holes stroke play combined score

Statistics
- Par: 72
- Field: 25 two-man teams
- Cut: None

Champion
- Australia; Kel Nagle & Peter Thomson
- 556 (−20)

The 1954 Canada Cup took place August 20–22 at the Laval-sur-le-Lac Golf Club in Laval, Quebec, Canada. It was the second Canada Cup event, which became the World Cup in 1967. The tournament was a 72-hole stroke play team event with 25 teams. Each team consisted of two players from a country. The combined score of each team determined the team results. 18 holes were played on the first two days with 36 holes played on the final day. The Australian team of Kel Nagle and Peter Thomson won by four strokes over the Argentine team of Antonio Cerdá and Roberto De Vicenzo. Canadian Stan Leonard had the lowest individual score with 275, two strokes ahead of Peter Thomson.

== Teams ==
Country	Players
Argentina	Antonio Cerdá and Roberto De Vicenzo
Australia	Kel Nagle and Peter Thomson
Belgium	Arthur Devulder and Flory Van Donck
Brazil	Mário Gonzalez and Ricardo Rossi
Canada	Jules Huot and Stan Leonard
Chile	Emilio Palacios and Luis Salas
Colombia	Pablo Molina and Raúl Posse
Egypt	Naaman Aly and Cherif El-Sayed Cherif
England	Peter Alliss and Harry Weetman
France	Jean Garaïalde and François Saubaber
Ireland	Harry Bradshaw and Fred Daly
Italy	Aldo Casera and Ugo Grappasonni
Japan	Michio Ishii and Torakichi Nakamura
Mexico	AI Escalante and Augustin Martinez
Netherlands	Joop Rühl and Piet Witte
New Zealand	Eddie Fennell and Ernie Southerden
Philippines	Larry Montes and Celestino Tugot
(Denmark) (Sweden) Scandinavia	Carl Paulsen and Arne Werkell (Note: The Scandinavian team consisted of a Dane, Carl Paulsen, and a Swede, Arne Werkell.)
Scotland	Eric Brown and Tom Haliburton
South Africa	Bobby Locke and Bert Thomas
Spain	Carlos Celles and Sebastián Miguel
Switzerland	Robert Lanz and Otto Schoepfer
United States	Jimmy Demaret and Sam Snead
Wales	Harry Gould and Dai Rees
West Germany	Georg Bessner and Friedel Schmaderer

== Scores ==
Team standings

Place	Country	Score	To par
1	Australia	137-144-140-135=556	−20
2	Argentina	142-139-138-141=560	−16
3	United States	144-140-139-142=565	−11
4	Canada	141-143-143-143=570	−6
5	Scotland	144-140-138-149=571	−5
6	France	147-140-143-143=573	−3
7	England	143-143-144-144=574	−2
8	Brazil	144-144-141-146=575	−1
T9	Belgium	150-146-143-139=578	+2
T9	South Africa	145-146-146-141=578	+2
T11	Ireland	143-148-139-149=579	+3
T11	Italy	147-149-146-137=579	+3
13	Spain	144-144-148-150=586	+10
14	Japan	152-144-149-146=591	+15
15	Egypt	152-151-150-140=593	+17
16	West Germany	149-153-150-143=595	+19
T17	Philippines	148-149-150-151=598	+22
T17	Wales	151-151-150-146=598	+22
T19	Chile	150-148-147-156=601	+25
T19	New Zealand	152-153-151-145=601	+25
21	(Denmark) (Sweden) Scandinavia	148-151-158-152=609	+33
T22	Netherlands	157-147-155-151=610	+34
T22	Mexico	152-155-157-146=610	+34
24	Switzerland	150-156-160-160=626	+50
WD	Colombia	149-WD (Note: Colombia withdrew after Raúl Posse became ill.)	

Individual leaders

Place	Player	Country	Score	To par
1	Stan Leonard	Canada	275	−13
T2	Antonio Cerdá	Argentina	277	−11
T2	Peter Thomson	Australia	277	−11
4	Jimmy Demaret	United States	278	−10
5	Kel Nagle	Australia	279	−9
T6	Dai Rees	Wales	282	−6
T6	Flory Van Donck	Belgium	282	−6
8	Roberto De Vicenzo	Argentina	283	−5
T9	Jean Garaïalde	France	284	−4
T9	Bobby Locke	South Africa	284	−4
T9	Harry Weetman	England	284	−4

Note: There was no official recognition for the lowest individual 72-hole-scores, but bonus money was paid for individual rounds, with Stan Leonard the winner earning US$367.
