= Harry Weetman =

English professional golfer

Personal information
- Full name: Harry Weetman
- Nationality: England
- Born: 25 October 1920 Oswestry, Shropshire
- Died: 19 July 1972 (aged 51) Redhill, Surrey

Career
- Sport: Golf
- Status: Professional
- Professional wins: 20

Best results in major championships
- Masters Tournament: T34: 1960
- PGA Championship: DNP
- U.S. Open: DNP
- The Open Championship: T5: 1955

Achievements and awards
- Harry Vardon Trophy: 1952, 1956

Harry Weetman (25 October 1920 – 19 July 1972) was an English professional golfer.

== Professional career ==
Weetman won many tournaments on the British PGA circuit in the pre-European Tour era and won the Harry Vardon Trophy for lowest stroke average in 1952 and 1956. He finished in the top-10 at The Open Championship six times.

Weetman played in the Ryder Cup in 1951, 1953, 1955, 1957, 1959, 1961 and 1963 and had a 2-11-2 win–loss–tie record, with both of his wins coming in singles matches. He captained the team in 1965.

== Death ==
Weetman died in Redhill hospital on 19 July 1972 after being involved in a car accident on the Caterham bypass on 14 July.

== Professional wins (20) ==
=== British PGA Circuit wins (16) ===
	Date	Tournament	Winning score	Margin of victory	Runner(s)-up
1.	7 Apr 1949	PGA Assistants' Championship	71-75-76-73=295	5 strokes	(England) Peter Alliss, (Wales) Harry Gould
2.	6 Apr 1950	PGA Assistants' Championship	76-70-70-71=287	7 strokes	(Wales) Dennis Smalldon
3.	22 Sep 1951	News of the World Match Play	5&4 in final		(Scotland) Jimmy Adams
4.	13 Jun 1952	Spalding Tournament	66-67-68-70=271	Tie	(Argentina) Antonio Cerdá
5.	9 Oct 1952	Dunlop Masters	71-72-66-72=281	4 strokes	(England) Arthur Lees
6.	20 Apr 1956	Spalding Tournament	68-69-68-71=276	Tie	(Republic of Ireland) Christy O'Connor Snr
7.	18 May 1957	Swallow-Penfold Tournament	73-65-65-67=270	3 strokes	(England) Peter Alliss, (Italy) Alfonso Angelini, (South Africa) Harold Henning, (Belgium) Flory Van Donck
8.	25 May 1958	Swallow-Penfold Tournament	75-69-77-68=289	Playoff	(Republic of Ireland) Harry Bradshaw
9.	13 Sep 1958	News of the World Match Play	1 up in final		(England) Bernard Hunt
10.	20 Sep 1958	Dunlop Masters	67-68-70-71=276	4 strokes	(South Africa) Bobby Locke
11.	22 Apr 1960	Spalding Tournament	70-66-68-69=273	5 strokes	(Wales) Dai Rees
12.	4 Jun 1960	Swallow-Penfold Tournament	64-70-69-68=271	2 strokes	(Republic of Ireland) Christy O'Connor Snr, (Australia) Peter Thomson
13.	13 Apr 1961	Northern Open	70-73-70-69=282	2 strokes	(South Africa) Harold Henning
14.	26 May 1962	Swallow-Penfold Tournament	69-69-72-70=280	3 strokes	(Scotland) Eric Brown
15.	16 Jul 1963	Blaxnit (Ulster) Tournament	69-66-67-67=269	7 strokes	(Republic of Ireland) Christy O'Connor Snr
16.	29 May 1964	Hennessy Round-robin Tournament	19 points	4 points	(England) Peter Alliss

=== Other wins (4) ===
This list may be incomplete

- 1955 West of England Professional Championship
- 1957 German Open, West of England Professional Championship
- 1958 Southern Professional Championship

== Results in major championships ==
Tournament	1949	1950	1951	1952	1953	1954	1955	1956	1957	1958	1959
Masters Tournament									CUT		
The Open Championship	CUT	CUT	T6	T15	T14	CUT	T5	T10	T12	T8	T16

Tournament	1960	1961	1962	1963	1964	1965	1966	1967	1968
Masters Tournament	T34								
The Open Championship	T9	CUT	T12	CUT	T6	T29	WD	T31	T45

Note: Weetman only played in the Masters Tournament and The Open Championship.

Top 10
Did not play

NT = No tournament
CUT = missed the half-way cut
WD = Withdrew
"T" indicates a tie for a place

== Team appearances ==
- Ryder Cup (representing Great Britain): 1951, 1953, 1955, 1957 (winners), 1959, 1961, 1963, 1965 (non-playing captain)
- Canada Cup (representing England): 1953, 1954, 1956, 1960
- Joy Cup (representing the British Isles): 1954 (winners), 1955 (winners), 1956 (winners), 1958 (winners)
- Slazenger Trophy (representing Great Britain and Ireland): 1956 (winners)
- Amateurs–Professionals Match (representing the Professionals): 1958, 1959 (winners)
