= Ugo Grappasonni =

Italian professional golfer

Personal information
- Full name: Ugo Grappasonni
- Nationality: Italy
- Born: 8 May 1922 Rome, Italy
- Died: 16 February 1999 (aged 76)

Career
- Sport: Golf
- Status: Professional
- Professional wins: 12

Best results in major championships
- Masters Tournament: DNP
- PGA Championship: DNP
- U.S. Open: DNP
- The Open Championship: T17: 1954

Ugo Grappasonni (8 May 1922 – 16 February 1999) was an Italian professional golfer.

== Career ==
In 1922, Grappasonni was born in Rome, Italy. He was one of the leading golfers in Italy, winning his national open twice, in 1950 and 1954, and the National Omnium on four occasions. He also won the French, Dutch and Swiss Opens, the latter twice.

Grappasonni was also a teaching professional at the Villa d'Este Golf Club. Along with Aldo Casera and Alfonso Angelini he founded the Professional Golfer's Association of Italy in 1962. The three men were known as the "three musketeers".

== Personal life ==
His son, Silvio, is also a professional golfer.

== Tournament wins ==
- 1941 Italian National Omnium
- 1948 Swiss Open
- 1949 French Open
- 1950 Italian Open
- 1952 Swiss Open
- 1953 Moroccan Open, Open del Ticino
- 1954 Dutch Open, Italian Open, Italian National Omnium
- 1955 Italian National Omnium
- 1957 Italian National Omnium

== Results in major championships ==
Tournament	1948	1949	1950	1951	1952	1953	1954	1955
The Open Championship	CUT	28		T19		T27	T17	T41

Note: Grappasonni only played in The Open Championship.

Did not play

CUT = missed the half-way cut
"T" = tied

== Team appearances ==
- Continental Europe–United States: (representing Continental Europe): 1953
- Canada Cup (representing Italy): 1954, 1955, 1956, 1957, 1959
- Joy Cup: (representing the Rest of Europe): 1954, 1955, 1956
