= Torakichi Nakamura =

Japanese golfer

Personal information
- Nicknames: Pete, Tora-san
- Nationality: Japan
- Born: 17 September 1915 Yokohama, Japan
- Died: 11 February 2008 (aged 92)
- Height: 1.58 m (5 ft 2 in)
- Weight: 65 kg (143 lb; 10.2 st)

Career
- Sport: Golf
- Status: Professional
- Former tour: Japan Golf Tour
- Professional wins: 24

Best results in major championships
- Masters Tournament: 41st: 1958
- PGA Championship: DNP
- U.S. Open: DNP
- The Open Championship: DNP

Torakichi Nakamura (中村 寅吉, Nakamura Torakichi; 17 September 1915 – 11 February 2008) was a Japanese golfer whose victory, with partner Koichi Ono, at the 1957 Canada Cup outside Tokyo helped to spur a boom in golf in Japan.

== Career ==
Nakamura, also known as "Pete", "Tora-san," and "the Putting God", was born in Yokohama, Kanagawa Prefecture and became a caddie at the age of 14. He became a professional golfer at the age of 20. He won the Japan Open in 1952, and won it twice more in his career, and was the first Japanese player to play in the Masters Tournament, in 1958.

In 1957, Nakamura and Ono teamed up to win the Canada Cup over a field which included Sam Snead and Gary Player. Nakamura also won the individual championship, at Kasumigaseki Country Club in Saitama Prefecture.

In 1974, Nakamura became President of the Japanese Ladies' Professional Golf Association. He was a mentor and teacher to Hisako Higuchi, the current JLPGA chairwoman and a member of the World Golf Hall of Fame.

== Tournament wins ==
this list is probably incomplete

- 1950 Kanto Open
- 1951 Kanto Open
- 1952 Japan Open, Kanto Open
- 1953 Kanto Open
- 1956 Japan Open, Kanto Open
- 1957 Kanto Open, Japan PGA Championship, Canada Cup (team event with Koichi Ono and individual event)
- 1958 Japan Open, Kanto Open, Japan PGA Championship
- 1959 Japan PGA Championship
- 1960 Chunichi Crowns, Kanto Pro Championship
- 1961 Kanto Pro Championship, Camp Zama Pro-Am Tournament
- 1962 Japan PGA Championship, Camp Zama Pro-Am Tournament
- 1964 Camp Zama Pro-Am Tournament
- 1968 Kanto Pro Championship
- 1973 Japan PGA Senior Championship
- 1976 Japan PGA Senior Championship

== Team appearances ==
- Canada Cup (representing Japan): 1954, 1957 (winners, individual winner), 1958, 1959, 1961, 1962
