= Jean Garaïalde =

French professional golfer

Personal information
- Full name: Jean Garaïalde
- Nationality: France
- Born: 2 October 1934 (age 92) Ciboure, France

Career
- Sport: Golf
- Turned professional: 1952
- Former tours: European Tour; European Seniors Tour
- Professional wins: 63

Number of wins by tour
- European Senior Tour: 1
- Other: 62

Best results in major championships
- Masters Tournament: CUT: 1964, 1966
- PGA Championship: DNP
- U.S. Open: DNP
- The Open Championship: T9: 1963

Jean Garaïalde (born 2 October 1934) is a French professional golfer.

== Career ==
In 1934, Garaïalde was born in Ciboure, Pyrénées-Atlantiques.

In 1952, Garaïalde turned professional. In 1969, he became the first French golfer since Firmin Cavalo in 1948 to claim his own national open. Around that time, he won several other national opens around Europe, including the German Open in 1969 and 1970 and the Spanish Open also in 1969.

In his home country, Garaïalde was dominant winning 12 French PGA titles between 1960 and 1982, including seven in a row from 1962, 17 French Native Opens between 1957 and 1987, and 12 French Professional Championships between 1968 and 1985.

Garaïalde represented France in the World Cup a record 25 times. He retired shortly after his final appearance in 1982, although he has since played in several European, Challenge and European Seniors Tour events that have been held in France. In 1992 he won the Turespaña Léman International Senior Trophy in Switzerland, and tied for 11th in the Senior British Open Championship.

== Professional wins (63) ==
This list may be incomplete

=== European wins (6) ===
- 1969 French Open, Spanish Open, German Open, Omnium de la Côte Basque
- 1970 German Open, Volvo Open

=== French wins (54) ===
- 1951 Omnium de Saint-Jean-de-Luz
- 1952 Omnium de Biarritz
- 1953 Omnium de Valescure, Omnium de Monte-Carlo
- 1957 French Native Open
- 1958 French Native Open
- 1960 Grand Prix PGA France
- 1962 Grand Prix PGA France, French Native Open
- 1963 Grand Prix PGA France, French Native Open
- 1964 Grand Prix PGA France, French Native Open
- 1965 Grand Prix PGA France, French Native Open, Omnium International d'Evian
- 1966 Grand Prix PGA France, French Native Open
- 1967 Grand Prix PGA France, French Native Open
- 1968 Grand Prix PGA France, Championnat de France Pro
- 1969 French Native Open, Championnat de France Pro
- 1970 Grand Prix PGA France, French Native Open, Championnat de France Pro
- 1971 Grand Prix PGA France, French Native Open, Championnat de France Pro
- 1972 French Native Open, Championnat de France Pro
- 1973 French Native Open
- 1974 French Native Open, Championnat de France Pro
- 1975 French Native Open, Championnat de France Pro
- 1976 French Native Open, Championnat de France Pro, Inter Maritime
- 1977 Championnat de France Pro
- 1978 Challenge Novotel, Inter Maritime
- 1979 Grand Prix PGA France
- 1980 Championnat de France Pro, French Match Play Championship, Challenge Novotel, Inter Maritime
- 1981 Trophée GSL Texas Institute
- 1982 Grand Prix PGA France, Championnat de France Pro, Rover Grand Prix, Cannes-Mougins Open
- 1985 Championnat de France Pro
- 1987 French Native Open

=== Other wins (2) ===
- 1969 Moroccan Open
- 1987 Ivory Coast Open

=== European Seniors Tour wins (1) ===
No.	Date	Tournament	Winning score	Margin of victory	Runners-up
1	8 Jul 1992	Turespaña Léman International Senior Trophy	−3 (71-70-69=210)	1 stroke	(England) Neil Coles, (United States) Chick Evans

== Results in major championships ==
Tournament	1954	1955	1956	1957	1958	1959	1960	1961	1962	1963	1964	1965	1966	1967	1968	1969	1970	1971
Masters Tournament											CUT		CUT					
The Open Championship	T32				T14	T21		T25	T12	T9	T13	CUT		T47		T30		CUT

Note: Garaïalde only played in the Masters Tournament and The Open Championship.

Top 10
Did not play

CUT = missed the half-way cut
"T" indicates a tie for a place

== Team appearances ==
- World Cup (representing France): 1954, 1955, 1957, 1958, 1960, 1961, 1962, 1963, 1964, 1965, 1966, 1967, 1968, 1970, 1971, 1972, 1973, 1974, 1975, 1976, 1977, 1978, 1979, 1980, 1982
- Joy Cup (representing the Rest of Europe): 1954, 1955, 1958
- Marlboro Nations' Cup/Philip Morris International (representing France): 1972, 1973, 1975 (winners), 1976
- Double Diamond International (representing Continental Europe): 1973
- Sotogrande Match/Hennessy Cognac Cup (representing the Continent of Europe): 1974, 1976, (representing France) 1984
