= 1960 Canada Cup =

Coordinates: 53.407°N 6.124°W

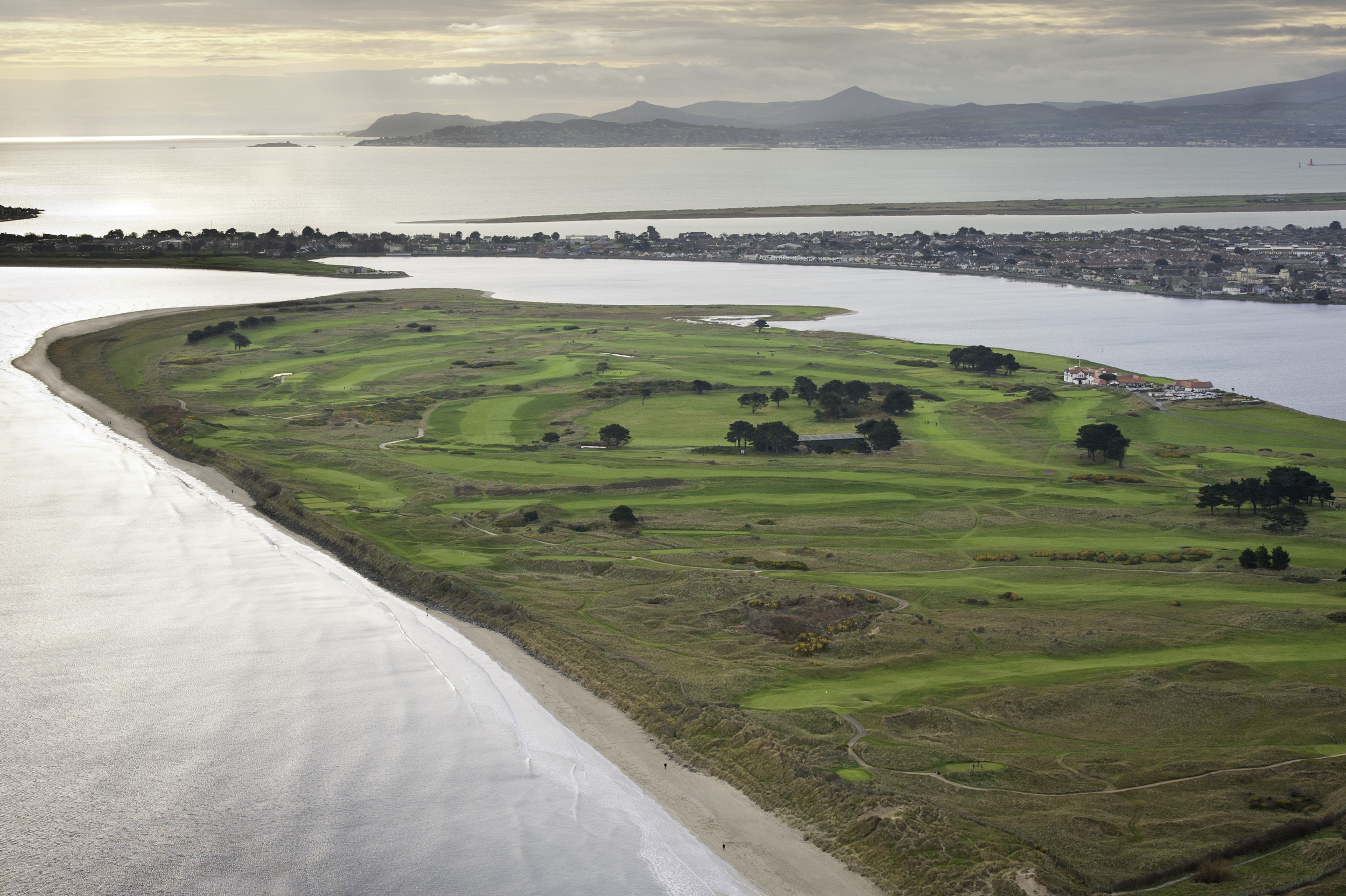
- Course at Portmarnock Golf Club

Tournament information
- Dates: 23–26 June
- Location: Portmarnock, Ireland
- Course: Portmarnock Golf Club
- Format: 72 holes stroke play combined score

Statistics
- Par: 72
- Length: 7,093 yards (6,486 m)
- Field: 30 two-man teams

Champion
- United States; Arnold Palmer & Sam Snead
- 565 (−11)

The 1960 Canada Cup took place 23–26 June at Portmarnock Golf Club in Portmarnock, north-east of Dublin, Ireland. It was the eighth Canada Cup event, which became the World Cup in 1967. The tournament was a 72-hole stroke play team event with 30 teams. These were the same teams that had competed in 1959 but without South Korea and Indonesia and with the addition of Peru and Central Africa. Each team consisted of two players from a country. The combined score of each team determined the team results. The American team of Arnold Palmer and Sam Snead won by eight strokes over the English team of Bernard Hunt and Harry Weetman. The individual competition was won by the Belgian Flory Van Donck, who finished two shots ahead of Sam Snead.

== Teams ==
Country	Players
Argentina	Fidel de Luca and Leopoldo Ruiz
Australia	Kel Nagle and Peter Thomson
Belgium	Arthur Devulder and Flory Van Donck
Brazil	José Maria Gonzalez and Mário Gonzalez
Canada	Al Balding and Stan Leonard
Central Africa	Wally Hill and James Parkinson
Chile	Luciano Calderon and Enrique Orellana
China	Chen Ching-Po and Hsieh Yung-yo
Colombia	Alfonso Bohórquez and Miguel Sala
Denmark	Henning Kristensen and Carl Paulsen
Egypt	Cherif El-Sayed Cherif and Mohamed Said Moussa
England	Bernard Hunt and Harry Weetman
France	Jean Garaïalde and François Saubaber
Ireland	Norman Drew and Christy O'Connor Snr
Italy	Alfonso Angelini and Ovidio Bolognesi
Japan	Koichi Ono and Sukemasa Shimamura
Mexico	Roberto De Vicenzo and José González
Netherlands	Gerard de Wit and Piet Witte
New Zealand	Frank Buckler and Ernie Southerden
Peru	Eugenio Dunezat and Alex Tibbles
Philippines	Ben Arda and Larry Montes
Portugal	Henrique Paulino and Fernando Pina
Scotland	Eric Brown and John Panton
South Africa	Bobby Locke and Gary Player
Spain	Ángel Miguel and Sebastián Miguel
Sweden	Åke Bergquist and Arne Werkell
Switzerland	Jacky Bonvin and Otto Schoepfer
United States	Arnold Palmer and Sam Snead
Wales	Dai Rees and Dave Thomas
West Germany	Hans Bessner and Kaspar Marx

== Scores ==
Team

Place	Country	Score	To par
1	United States	140-139-142-144=565	−11
2	England	148-143-138-144=573	−3
3	Australia	149-137-142-146=574	−2
4	Ireland	143-139-149-144=575	−1
5	South Africa	137-147-140-154=578	+2
6	Scotland	143-146-142-149=580	+4
7	Belgium	141-146-147-148=582	+6
8	Wales	145-145-148-146=584	+8
T9	Argentina	144-143-151-149=587	+11
T9	Spain	151-147-144-145=587	+11
11	Canada	146-144-151-147=588	+12
12	Mexico	149-148-147-147=591	+15
13	Colombia	153-151-143-145=592	+16
14	Egypt	150-151-146-148=595	+19
15	France	147-152-148-150=597	+21
16	Italy	145-150-147-157=599	+23
17	Japan	149-148-150-153=600	+24
18	New Zealand	151-146-149-158=604	+28
19	Philippines	149-154-156-146=605	+29
T20	Brazil	157-148-157-144=606	+30
T20	China	150-155-156-145=606	+30
22	Denmark	152-152-149-154=607	+31
23	Switzerland	156-144-152-156=608	+32
T24	Netherlands	155-152-151-153=611	+35
T24	Peru	150-154-156-151=611	+35
26	Central Africa	154-154-154-150=612	+36
27	Chile	156-151-155-151=613	+37
28	Sweden	159-153-153-152=617	+41
29	West Germany	160-157-152-163=632	+56
30	Portugal	160-166-163-157=646	+70

International Trophy

Place	Player	Country	Score	To par
1	Flory Van Donck	Belgium	68-71-70-70=279	−9
2	Sam Snead	United States	71-68-67-75=281	−7
T3	Arnold Palmer	United States	69-71-75-69=284	−4
T3	Harry Weetman	England	75-70-68-71=284	−4
T5	Eric Brown	Scotland	70-72-71-73=286	−2
T5	Christy O'Connor Snr	Ireland	73-68-73-72=286	−2
T5	Peter Thomson	Australia	73-69-69-75=286	−2
8	Roberto De Vicenzo	Mexico	73-70-72-72=287	−1
T9	Gerard de Wit	Netherlands	74-69-73-72=288	E
T9	Mário Gonzalez	Brazil	74-70-74-70=288	E
T9	Kel Nagle	Australia	76-68-73-71=288	E
