= John Cockin =

English golfer (1939–2024)

Personal information
- Full name: John Cockin
- Nationality: England
- Born: 28 January 1939 Yorkshire, England
- Died: 1 January 2024 (aged 84)

Career
- Sport: Golf
- Turned professional: 1955
- Professional wins: 8

Best results in major championships
- Masters Tournament: DNP
- PGA Championship: DNP
- U.S. Open: DNP
- The Open Championship: 55th: 1967

John Cockin (28 January 1939 – 1 January 2024) was an English professional golfer. He won two important events, the Penfold Tournament in 1967 and the Dutch Open in 1968. He played little tournament golf and was primarily a club professional in Sweden, where he lived for more than 60 years.

== Early life ==
Cockin started playing golf at age 10 at Springhead Park Golf Club in Hull, where his father and brother were members. Cockin received his first set of golf clubs from his father, who bought them on an auction for one pound. The auction company had just randomly filled a golf bag with twelve woods, two putters and one iron club, with which Cockin started playing.

== Professional career ==
In the mid-1950s, he became an assistant professional at the nearby Hull Golf Club where Stan Stenhouse was the professional. From 1958, he spent two years in National Service, serving in the RAF. He was then briefly an assistant to Jim Griffiths at Newmarket Golf Club before taking up a position in Sweden in 1962.

In 1967 and 1968, Cockin was sponsored by a Swedish businessman to play on the British and European circuit. He won two tournaments: the 1967 Penfold Tournament at Blackpool North Shore Golf Club and the 1968 Dutch Open at Hilversumsche Golf Club. In the 1967 Penfold event, Cockin was tied with Australian Stan Peach after the 72 holes. He had been four strokes behind the leader after three rounds but had a final round 64. In the sudden-death playoff, Cockin had a birdie four at the first playoff hole to win the tournament and the £750 first prize. Cockin became the first Swedish resident, despite not being a Swedish citizen, to win an important European professional tournament.

Cockin's win in the 1968 Dutch Open was also after a playoff. He had led after two rounds but finished in a tie with Ángel Gallardo from Spain and Australian Bob Shaw. In the playoff, Shaw went out at the second hole and Cockin won with a three at the third extra hole. Cockin played in the Open Championship in 1967 at Royal Liverpool and in 1968 at Carnoustie. He finished 55th in 1967, having just made the cut after a hole in one in the second round at the 11th hole. In 1968, he again made the second-round but missed the third-round cut that was introduced that year.

== Affiliations ==
Cockin served as chairman of the board of the PGA of Sweden 1974-1980 and 1983-1996.

== Personal life and death ==
Cockin attended Beverley Grammar School. He was twice married: to Doris, with whom he had two children, and to Gudrun, with whom he had a further child.

John Cockin died on 1 January 2024, 27 days before his 85th birthday.

== Awards and honors ==
- 1980 PGA of Sweden Merit Sign in Gold
- 1988 Honorary member of PGA of Sweden

== Professional wins (8) ==
=== Important British and European wins (2) ===
No.	Date	Tournament	Winning score	Margin of victory	Runner(s)-up	Ref.
1	6 May 1967	Penfold Tournament	68-72-71-64=275	Playoff	(Australia) Stan Peach	
2	22 Jul 1968	Dutch Open	72-69-75-76=292	Playoff	(Spain) Ángel Gallardo, (Australia) Bob Shaw	

=== Other wins (6) ===
- 1964 Penfold Cup (Sweden)
- 1966 Dunlop Cup (Sweden)
- 1973 Liz Cup (Sweden)
- 1975 Knallecuppen Pro-Am (Borås, Sweden) (with Anders Brandter)
- 1976 Knallecuppen Pro-Am (Borås, Sweden) (with Anders Brandter)
- 1976 Swedish PGA Championship

== Results in major championships ==
Tournament	1967	1968
The Open Championship	55	CUT

Note: Cockin only played in The Open Championship.
CUT = missed the 3rd round cut
