= 1959 Canada Cup =

Coordinates: 37.969°S 145.028°E

Tournament information
- Dates: 18–21 November
- Location: Melbourne, Australia
- Course(s): Royal Melbourne Golf Club (Composite course)
- Format: 72 holes stroke play combined score

Statistics
- Par: 70
- Length: 6,853 yards (6,266 m)
- Field: 30 two-man teams

Champion
- Australia; Kel Nagle & Peter Thomson
- 563 (+3)

Location in Australia
Location in Victoria
Location in greater Melbourne

The 1959 Canada Cup took place 18–21 November at the Royal Melbourne Golf Club in Melbourne, Australia. It was the seventh Canada Cup event, which became the World Cup in 1967. The tournament was a 72-hole stroke play team event with 30 teams. These were the same teams that had competed in 1958 but without Ecuador, Peru and Venezuela and with the addition of Indonesia. Each team consisted of two players from a country. The combined score of each team determined the team results. The Australian team of Kel Nagle and Peter Thomson won by 10 strokes over the American team of Cary Middlecoff and Sam Snead. The individual competition was won by Canadian Stan Leonard, who beat Peter Thomson at the first hole of a sudden-death playoff.

== Teams ==
Country	Players
Argentina	Fidel de Luca and Leopoldo Ruiz
Australia	Kel Nagle and Peter Thomson
Belgium	Donald Swaelens and Flory Van Donck
Brazil	José Maria Gonzalez and Mário Gonzalez
Canada	Al Balding and Stan Leonard
Chile	Luciano Calderon and Enrique Orellana
China	Chen Ching-Po and Hsieh Yung-yo
Colombia	Pablo Molina and Miguel Sala
Denmark	Henning Kristensen and Carl Paulsen
Egypt	Cherif El-Sayed Cherif and Mohamed Said Moussa
England	Peter Alliss and Bernard Hunt
France	Roger Cotton and François Saubaber
Indonesia	Salim and Sjamsudin
Ireland	Harry Bradshaw and Christy O'Connor Snr
Italy	Alfonso Angelini and Ugo Grappasonni
Japan	Torakichi Nakamura and Haruyoshi Kobari
Mexico	Roberto De Vicenzo and Juan Neri
Netherlands	Gerard de Wit and Joop Rühl
New Zealand	Frank Buckler and John Kelly
Philippines	Vic Allin and Larry Montes
Portugal	Henrique Paulino and F De Silva Pina
Scotland	Eric Brown and John Panton
South Africa	Harold Henning and Gary Player
South Korea	Kim Hark Young and Park Myeong-chul
Spain	Ángel Miguel and Sebastián Miguel
Sweden	Åke Bergquist and Harry Karlsson
Switzerland	Jacky Bonvin and Otto Schoepfer
United States	Cary Middlecoff and Sam Snead
Wales	Dai Rees and Dave Thomas
West Germany	Friedrich Becker and Herbert Becker

== Scores ==
Team

Place	Country	Score	To par
1	Australia	137-139-144-143=563	+3
2	United States	145-140-148-140=573	+13
3	Canada	144-139-144-147=574	+14
4	South Africa	144-147-142-147=580	+20
5	England	150-145-146-147=588	+28
6	Wales	144-143-154-149=590	+30
7	Scotland	158-147-146-144=595	+35
8	China	152-152-146-147=597	+37
T9	Argentina	151-153-150-147=601	+41
T9	Spain	152-145-147-157=601	+41
11	Belgium	152-151-151-148=602	+42
12	Ireland	150-148-151-154=603	+43
13	Japan	147-148-148-162=605	+45
14	France	155-150-150-153=608	+48
15	Italy	151-152-154-152=609	+49
16	Brazil	151-157-152-159=619	+59
T17	Chile	157-154-145-166=622	+62
T17	Mexico	154-149-160-159=622	+62
T17	New Zealand	154-155-153-160=622	+62
20	Colombia	155-152-160-158=625	+65
21	Egypt	160-157-157-157=631	+71
22	Sweden	159-149-160-169=637	+77
23	Switzerland	168-154-168-161=651	+91
T24	Denmark	165-156-164-167=652	+92
T24	West Germany	164-161-163-164=652	+92
26	Portugal	166-161-161-166=654	+94
27	Philippines	173-166-159-157=655	+95
28	Netherlands	167-165-161-165=658	+98
29	South Korea	166-162-162-172=662	+102
30	Indonesia	185-181-179-181=726	+166

International Trophy

Place	Player	Country	Score	To par
1	Stan Leonard	Canada	70-66-69-70=275	−5
2	Peter Thomson	Australia	67-69-68-71=275	−5
3	Sam Snead	United States	73-65-73-70=281	+1
4	Gary Player	South Africa	72-72-71-69=284	+4
5	Kel Nagle	Australia	70-70-76-72=288	+8
T6	Eric Brown	Scotland	78-72-75-67=292	+12
T6	Chen Ching-Po	China	76-73-71-72=292	+12
T6	Cary Middlecoff	United States	72-75-75-70=292	+12
T6	Flory Van Donck	Belgium	70-75-75-72=292	+12
10	Peter Alliss	England	73-74-70-76=293	+13

Leonard beat Thomson with a par 4 at the first hole of a sudden-death playoff.
