= 1968 World Cup (men's golf) =

Coordinates: 42.0377°N 12.3661°E

Tournament information
- Dates: 14–17 November
- Location: Rome, Italy
- Course: Olgiata Golf Club
- Format: 72 holes stroke play combined score

Statistics
- Par: 72
- Length: 6,850 yards (6,260 m)
- Field: 42 two-man teams
- Cut: None
- Prize fund: US$6,300
- Winner's share: $2,000 team $1,000 individual

Champion
- Canada; Al Balding & George Knudson
- 569 (−7)

The 1968 World Cup took place 14–17 November at the Olgiata Golf Club in Rome, Italy. It was the 16th World Cup event, which was named the Canada Cup until 1966 and changed its name to the World Cup in 1967. The tournament was a 72-hole stroke play team event with 42 teams. The third round on Saturday was interrupted by hail and rain storm, with six teams still on the course and play was resumed early Sunday. Each team consisted of two players from a country. The combined score of each team determined the team results. The Canadian team of Al Balding and George Knudson won by two strokes ahead of the United States team of Julius Boros and Lee Trevino. The individual competition was won by Balding, five strokes ahead of Roberto Bernardini, Italy. This was the first team victory for Canada in the event, which was founded in Canada in 1953.

== Teams ==
Country	Players
Argentina	Roberto De Vicenzo and Bono Tudino
Australia	Bill Dunk and Col Johnston
Austria	Oswald Gartenmaier and Hans Stroll
Belgium	Donald Swaelens and Flory Van Donck
Brazil	Jose Maria Gonzalez and Mário Gonzalez
Canada	Al Balding and George Knudson
Chile	Francisco Cerda and Enrique Orelanna
Colombia	Alfonso Bohorquez and Rogelio Gonzalez
China	Hsieh Yung-yo and Lu Liang-Huan
Czechoslovakia	Jiří Dvořák (a) and Jan Kunšta (a)
Denmark	Herluf Hansen and Henning Kristensen
England	Neil Coles and Bernard Hunt
Finland	Jalo Grönlund (a) and Sigurd Nyström
France	Roger Cotton and Jean Garaïalde
Greece	Aris Simeonoglou (a) and John Sotiropoulos (a)
Hawaii	Morgan Fottrell and Guinea Kop
Ireland	Jimmy Kinsella and Christy O'Connor Snr
Italy	Roberto Bernardini and Alfonso Angelini
Japan	Kenji Hosoishi and Takaaki Kono
Mexico	Antonio Cerdá and Juan Neri
Monaco	Jean Baptiste Ado and Jean Charles Rey (a)
Morocco	Omar Ben El Harcha and Meilouki M'Bareck
Netherlands	Martin Roesink and Bertus Van Mook
New Zealand	Bob Charles and Walter Godfrey
Norway	Westye Hoegh (a) and Lars Musaeus (a)
Peru	Bernabé Fajardo and Hugo Nari
Philippines	Ireneo Legaspi and Eleuterio Nival
Portugal	Manual Ribeiro and Joauim Rodrigues
Puerto Rico	David Jiménez and Chi-Chi Rodríguez
Scotland	Eric Brown and John Panton
Singapore	Phua Thin Kiay (a) and Alvin Liau
South Africa	Cobie Legrange and Gary Player
South Korea	Han Chang-sang and Lee Il-an
Spain	Sebastián Miguel and Ramón Sota
Sweden	Åke Bergquist and Harry Karlsson-Fakt
Switzerland	Jacky Bonvin and Ronald Tingley
United Arab Republic	Cherif El Sayed and Abdel Halim
United States	Julius Boros and Lee Trevino
Uruguay	Jan Carlos Dapiaggi and Clever Mendez
Venezuela	F.D. Betancourt and Ramón Muñoz
Wales	Richard Davies and Brian Huggett
West Germany	Hans Heiser and Toni Kugelmuller

(a) denotes amateur

== Scores ==
Team

Place	Country	Score	To par	Money (US$)
1	Canada	142-149-137-141=569	−7	2,000
2	United States	142-141-143-145=571	−5	1,000
3	Italy	141-147-140-145=573	−3	800
4	China	139-144-143-150=576	E	400
5	Spain	144-148-139-149=580	+4	
6	South Africa	148-144-147-145=584	+8	
7	New Zealand	144-149-141-151=585	+9	
8	Wales	143-148-145-150=586	+10	
9	Argentina	145-145-150-147=587	+11	
T10	England	140-150-145-153=588	+12	
T10	Ireland	149-139-148-152=588	+12	
T10	Japan	149-142-150-147=588	+12	
13	Scotland	145-146-144-155=590	+14	
14	Australia	148-146-148-150=592	+16	
15	Colombia	153-148-146-147=594	+18	
16	Puerto Rico	151-149-153-143=596	+20	
17	South Korea	151-144-151-151=597	+21	
18	West Germany	150-146-152-151=599	+23	
19	Belgium	146-149-153-156=604	+28	
20	Mexico	147-149-157-152=605	+29	
21	Denmark	152-154-146-155=607	+31	
22	Brazil	156-145-157-153=611	+35	
T23	Peru	155-152-154-153=614	+38	
T23	United Arab Republic	153-154-150-157=614	+38	
25	France	153-151-152-160=616	+40	
26	Netherlands	153-150-162-153=618	+42	
27	Chile	155-146-162-161=624	+48	
28	Philippines	159-157-153-159=628	+52	
29	Switzerland	152-154-161-166=633	+57	
30	Venezuela	160-153-163-161=637	+61	
T31	Hawaii	166-157-165-152=640	+64	
T31	Sweden	157-157-168-158=640	+64	
33	Uruguay	158-161-164-160=643	+67	
34	Singapore	154-160-166-164=644	+68	
35	Norway	157-166-161-166=650	+74	
36	Monaco	160-162-163-168=653	+77	
37	Czechoslovakia	163-161-169-163=656	+80	
38	Morocco	166-166-165-160=657	+81	
39	Portugal	168-158-163-172=661	+85	
40	Finland	162-162-172-173=669	+93	
41	Greece	166-165-173-168=672	+96	
42	Austria	173-171-170-166=680	+104	

International Trophy

Place	Player	Country	Score	To par	Money (US$)
1	Al Balding	Canada	68-72-67-67=274	−14	1,000
2	Roberto Bernardini	Italy	71-71-67-70=279	−9	500
3	Lee Trevino	United States	69-71-70-73=283	−5	400
T4	Brian Huggett	Wales	71-70-71-73=285	−3	100
T4	Gary Player	South Africa	71-70-74-70=285	−3	100
T6	Eric Brown	Scotland	70-69-70-77=286	−2	
T6	Lu Liang-Huan	China	69-69-72-76=286	−2	
8	Ramón Sota	Spain	71-73-71-72=287	−1	
T9	Julius Boros	United States	73-70-73-72=288	E	
T9	Bill Dunk	Australia	72-75-70-71=288	E	
