= 1958 Canada Cup =

Coordinates: 19.280°N 99.158°W

Tournament information
- Dates: 20–23 November
- Location: Mexico City, Mexico
- Course: Club de Golf México
- Format: 72 holes stroke play combined score

Statistics
- Par: 72
- Length: 7,216 yards (6,598 m)
- Field: 32 two-man teams

Champion
- Ireland; Harry Bradshaw & Christy O'Connor Snr
- 579 (+3)

The 1958 Canada Cup took place 20–23 November at the Club de Golf México in Mexico City, Mexico. It was the sixth Canada Cup event, which became the World Cup in 1967. The tournament was a 72-hole stroke play team event with 32 teams. These were the same 30 teams that had competed in 1957 without Thailand but with the addition of Ecuador, Peru and Venezuela. Each team consisted of two players from a country. The combined score of each team determined the team results. The Irish team of Harry Bradshaw and Christy O'Connor Snr won by three strokes over the Spanish team of Ángel Miguel and Sebastián Miguel. The individual competition was won by Ángel Miguel, who beat Harry Bradshaw at the third hole of a sudden-death playoff.

== Teams ==
Country	Players
Argentina	Fidel de Luca and Leopoldo Ruiz
Australia	Kel Nagle and Frank Phillips
Belgium	Donald Swaelens and Flory Van Donck
Brazil	Mário Gonzalez and Luis Rapisarda
Canada	Al Balding and Henry Martell
Chile	Luciano Calderon and Enrique Orellana
China	Chen Ching-po and Hsieh Yung-yo
Colombia	Pablo Molina and Miguel Sala
Denmark	Henning Kristensen and Carl Paulsen
Ecuador	Lee Holbrook and Eduardo Miartus
Egypt	Naaman Aly and Mohamed Said Moussa
England	Peter Alliss and Bernard Hunt
France	Jean Baptiste Ado and Jean Garaïalde
West Germany	Friedrich Becker and Georg Bessner
Ireland	Harry Bradshaw and Christy O'Connor Snr
Italy	Alfonso Angelini and Aldo Casera
Japan	Torakichi Nakamura and Koichi Ono
Mexico	José González and Juan Neri
Netherlands	Cees Cramer and Gerard de Wit
New Zealand	Frank Buckler and Ernie Southerden
Peru	Eugenio Dunezat and Alex Tibbles
Philippines	Ben Arda and Celestino Tugot
Portugal	Henrique Paulino and Fernando Silva
Scotland	Eric Brown and John Panton
South Africa	Harold Henning and Gary Player
South Korea	Kim Bok-man and Park Myeong-chul
Spain	Ángel Miguel and Sebastián Miguel
Sweden	Harry Karlsson and Arne Werkell
Switzerland	Jacky Bonvin and Otto Schoepfer
United States	Ben Hogan and Sam Snead
Venezuela	Manolo Bernandez and Teobaldo Perez
Wales	Dai Rees and Dave Thomas
West Germany	Friedrich Becker and Georg Bessner

Gerard de Wit, representing the Netherlands, never reached Mexico after the plane he was travelling in developed engine problems. Cees Cramer played as an individual.

== Scores ==
Team

Place	Country	Score	To par
1	Ireland	143-143-150-143=579	+3
2	Spain	148-148-144-142=582	+6
3	South Africa	154-140-148-142=584	+8
T4	Australia	142-150-152-144=588	+12
T4	Scotland	145-149-144-150=588	+12
6	England	144-149-152-148=593	+17
7	Argentina	144-151-156-143=594	+18
8	Wales	153-147-147-148=595	+19
9	Venezuela	157-145-152-147=601	+25
T10	Belgium	152-152-147-152=603	+27
T10	Colombia	149-149-159-146=603	+27
T12	China	150-147-152-155=604	+28
T12	Italy	151-157-154-142=604	+28
14	Brazil	146-158-149-152=605	+29
15	Philippines	148-152-148-158=606	+30
T16	Japan	151-149-149-158=607	+31
T16	New Zealand	155-149-151-152=607	+31
18	Canada	150-154-154-150=608	+32
19	Chile	155-152-155-149=611	+35
20	Mexico	164-149-154-150=617	+41
21	West Germany	156-155-157-151=619	+43
22	Peru	155-159-148-158=620	+44
23	Switzerland	158-154-158-152=622	+46
24	Denmark	156-155-155-160=626	+50
25	Sweden	162-157-154-156=629	+53
26	France	157-156-157-163=633	+57
27	Egypt	164-160-162-155=641	+65
28	South Korea	165-165-165-164=659	+83
29	Portugal	168-168-165-166=667	+91
WD	United States	143-145-WD	
WD	Ecuador	165-WD	
WD	Netherlands	WD	

Lee Holbrook of Ecuador withdrew after the first round and Sam Snead of the United States withdrew after the second round.

International Trophy

Place	Player	Country	Score	To par
1	Ángel Miguel	Spain	72-73-71-70=286	−2
2	Harry Bradshaw	Ireland	70-70-76-70=286	−2
3	Flory Van Donck	Belgium	70-72-71-74=287	−1
4	Miguel Sala	Colombia	69-74-74-71=288	E
T5	Eric Brown	Scotland	72-72-70-75=289	+1
T5	Frank Phillips	Australia	70-77-72-70=289	+1
7	Gary Player	South Africa	74-72-74-71=291	+3
8	Leopoldo Ruiz	Argentina	70-74-77-71=292	+4
T9	Chen Ching-Po	China	72-73-72-76=293	+5
T9	Harold Henning	South Africa	80-68-74-71=293	+5
T9	Christy O'Connor Snr	Ireland	73-73-74-73=293	+5

Miguel beat Bradshaw at the third hole of a sudden-death playoff.
