= Antonio Cerdá =

Argentine golfer

Personal information
- Nationality: Argentina
- Born: 10 December 1921 Río Cuarto, Córdoba, Argentina
- Died: 28 November 2010 (aged 88) Mexico City, Mexico

Career
- Sport: Golf
- Status: Professional
- Professional wins: 37

Best results in major championships
- Masters Tournament: T24: 1961
- PGA Championship: DNP
- U.S. Open: DNP
- The Open Championship: 2nd/T2: 1951, 1953

Antonio Cerdá (10 December 1921 – 28 November 2010) was an Argentine professional golfer.

== Professional career ==
Cerdá solo runner-up second in the 1951 Open Championship to Max Faulkner. Two years later he finished joint runner-up at the 1953 Open Championship to Ben Hogan, among seven consecutive top-ten finishes in the championship. He won several national opens in Europe in the 1950s and won the first Canada Cup with Roberto De Vicenzo in 1953 for Argentina. Later in his career, Cerdá would emigrate to Mexico, and also represented that country five times at the World Cup, finishing third in 1967.

After an outstanding professional career, Cerdá dedicated over 40 years to golf instruction, particularly to young players in Mexico, like his son Antonio Cerdá Jr.

== Professional wins (37) ==
=== European wins (8) ===
- 1950 Spanish Open
- 1951 German Open
- 1952 German Open, Belgian Open, Spalding Tournament (tie with Harry Weetman)
- 1955 Yorkshire Evening News Tournament
- 1956 Dutch Open, Italian Open

=== Argentine wins (23) ===
- 1944 Cordoba PGA Championship
- 1946 Alta Gracia Tournament
- 1948 Argentine Open, Palermo Match Play
- 1949 Ranelagh Open
- 1950 South Open, Masllorens Grand Prix
- 1951 Cirio Grand Prix
- 1952 Argentine PGA Championship, Center Open, Jockey Club Grand Prix
- 1953 Center Open
- 1954 Acantilados Grand Prix, Jockey Club Grand Prix, Fernet Branca Grand Prix
- 1955 South Open, Center Open
- 1956 Argentine Open, Ranelagh Open, Rio Cuarto Open, Western Textil Grand Prix
- 1957 Rio Cuarto Open, Western Textil Grand Prix (tie with Romulado Barbieri and Fidel de Luca)

=== Other wins (6) ===
this list is probably incomplete

- 1953 Canada Cup (team with Roberto De Vicenzo)
- 1954 Barranquilla Open (Colombia)
- 1955 Panama Open, Manizalez Tournament (Colombia), Jamaica Open
- 1958 Mexican Open

== Results in major championships ==
Tournament	1949	1950	1951	1952	1953	1954	1955	1956	1957	1958	1959	1960	1961	1962	1963	1964
Masters Tournament													T24	T39	T39	CUT
The Open Championship	CUT	CUT	2	T5	T2	T5	T5	T8	T9	T26	T16					

Note: Cerdá only played in the Masters Tournament and The Open Championship.

Top 10
Did not play

NT = No tournament
CUT = missed the half-way cut
"T" indicates a tie for a place

== Team appearances ==
- World Cup (representing Argentina): 1953 (winners), 1954, 1955, 1957
- World Cup (representing Mexico): 1962, 1963, 1965, 1967, 1968
