= Ken Bousfield =

British professional golfer (1919–2000)

Personal information
- Full name: Kenneth Bousfield
- Nationality: England
- Born: 2 October 1919 Marston Moor, Yorkshire
- Died: 25 May 2000 (aged 80)

Career
- Sport: Golf
- Turned professional: 1938
- Former tour: European Tour
- Professional wins: 19

Best results in major championships
- Masters Tournament: DNP
- PGA Championship: DNP
- U.S. Open: DNP
- The Open Championship: T5: 1955

Kenneth Bousfield (2 October 1919 – 25 May 2000) was one of the leading British golfers of the immediate post-World War II period.

== Professional career ==
Bousfield won a number of tournaments on the European circuit in the 1950s and 1960s, including the British PGA Championship, which is the second most prestigious tournament in the United Kingdom after The Open Championship. He had two top ten finishes at The Open Championship, finishing in a tie for fifth in 1955 and a tie for eighth in 1961. He was past his peak by the time the formal European Tour was formed in 1972, but he played on it until 1976.

Bousfield also played for Great Britain in the Ryder Cup six times (1949, 1951, 1955, 1957, 1959, 1961) and had a 5-5-0 win–loss–draw record.

== Professional wins (19) ==
=== Regular wins (18) ===
This list is probably incomplete.

- 1951 Southern Professional Championship, News Chronicle Tournament
- 1955 British PGA Championship, News of the World Match Play, German Open
- 1956 Yorkshire Evening News Tournament (tie with Dai Rees)
- 1957 Dunlop Tournament, Southern Professional Championship
- 1958 Belgian Open, Swiss Open
- 1959 Sprite Tournament, German Open
- 1960 Portuguese Open
- 1961 Portuguese Open, Swallow-Penfold Tournament
- 1964 Ryder Cup Reunion Foursomes Tournament (with Alex Caygill), Gleneagles Hotel Foursomes Tournament (with Keith Warren)

=== Senior wins (1) ===
- 1972 PGA Seniors Championship

== Results in major championships ==
Tournament	1947	1948	1949
The Open Championship	T27	T21	T11

Tournament	1950	1951	1952	1953	1954	1955	1956	1957	1958	1959
The Open Championship	CUT	CUT	T21	T34		T5	T22	T35		T11

Tournament	1960	1961	1962	1963	1964	1965	1966	1967	1968	1969
The Open Championship	T21	T8	CUT	T30	CUT		CUT	54		

Tournament	1970	1971	1972
The Open Championship			CUT

Note: Bousfield only played in The Open Championship.

Top 10
Did not play

CUT = missed the half-way cut
"T" indicates a tie for a place

== Team appearances ==
- Ryder Cup (representing Great Britain): 1949, 1951, 1955, 1957 (winners), 1959, 1961
- Canada Cup (representing England): 1956, 1957
- Joy Cup (representing the British Isles): 1955 (winners), 1958 (winners)
- Amateurs–Professionals Match (representing the Professionals): 1957 (winners), 1958, 1959 (winners), 1960 (winners)
