= John Panton =

Scottish golfer

Personal information
- Nickname: Gentleman John
- Nationality: Scotland
- Born: 9 October 1916 Pitlochry, Scotland
- Died: 24 July 2009 (aged 92) Windsor, Berkshire, England
- Children: Catherine, Joan

Career
- Sport: Golf
- Turned professional: 1935
- Former tour: European Tour
- Professional wins: 44

Best results in major championships
- Masters Tournament: DNP
- PGA Championship: DNP
- U.S. Open: DNP
- The Open Championship: 5th/T5: 1956, 1959

Achievements and awards
- Member of the Order of the British Empire: 1980
- Harry Vardon Trophy: 1951

John Panton, MBE (9 October 1916 – 24 July 2009) was a Scottish professional golfer, who represented Great Britain three times in the Ryder Cup.

== Career ==
Panton was born in Pitlochry. He turned professional in 1935 and took up a job in the local golf club shop. After serving in the army during World War II, Panton went on to win many prestigious tournaments including the 1950 Silver King Tournament, the 1951 Daks Tournament, and the 1952 North British-Harrogate Tournament, and 1956 PGA Match Play Championship. He also won the Woodlawn Invitation Open in Germany for three consecutive years from 1958.

In Scotland, he dominated, with eight victories in the Scottish Professionals Championship and seven in the Northern Open between 1948 and 1966.

In addition to tournament golf, Panton also served as a club professional at Glenbervie Golf Club until 1984. Later in his career, he won the PGA Seniors Championship twice, in 1967 and 1969, and the World Senior Championship in 1967, defeating Sam Snead 3 and 2 in the final.

Panton was appointed honorary professional to The Royal and Ancient Golf Club of St Andrews in 1988, a position he held until his retirement in 2006. In 2005, he was made an honorary life member of the European Tour.

As well as his Ryder Cup appearances in 1951, 1953 and 1961, Panton also represented Scotland 13 times in the World Cup between 1955 and 1968.

== Personal life ==
Panton's daughter, Catherine Panton-Lewis, is a professional golfer and was a founding member of the Ladies European Tour.

In common with Arnold Palmer, Panton had a beverage named after him in his home country. A John Panton is a drink consisting of angostura bitters, ginger beer mixed with a dash of lime cordial.

== Professional wins ==
This list is incomplete

- 1948 Northern Open, Scottish Professional Championship
- 1949 Scottish Professional Championship
- 1950 Silver King Tournament, Scottish Professional Championship
- 1951 Daks Tournament, Northern Open, Scottish Professional Championship
- 1952 North British-Harrogate Tournament, Northern Open, Goodwin (Sheffield) Foursomes Tournament (with Norman Roffe)
- 1954 Scottish Professional Championship, Yorkshire Evening News Tournament
- 1955 Scottish Professional Championship
- 1956 News of the World Match Play, Northern Open, Gleneagles-Saxone Foursomes Tournament (with W Alexander)
- 1958 Woodlawn Invitation Open
- 1959 Woodlawn Invitation Open, Northern Open, Scottish Professional Championship
- 1960 Woodlawn Invitation Open, Northern Open
- 1962 Northern Open
- 1964 Cutty Sark Tournament
- 1965 Cutty Sark Tournament
- 1966 Scottish Professional Championship (tied with Eric Brown)
- 1967 PGA Seniors Championship, World Senior Championship, Cutty Sark Tournament
- 1968 Scottish Coca-Cola Tournament
- 1969 PGA Seniors Championship
- 1971 Scottish Coca-Cola Tournament

== Results in major championships ==
Tournament	1937	1938	1939
The Open Championship	CUT		

Tournament	1940	1941	1942	1943	1944	1945	1946	1947	1948	1949
The Open Championship	NT	NT	NT	NT	NT	NT			CUT	CUT

Tournament	1950	1951	1952	1953	1954	1955	1956	1957	1958	1959
The Open Championship	T20	11	T15	T27	CUT	CUT	5	T15	CUT	T5

Tournament	1960	1961	1962	1963	1964	1965	1966	1967	1968	1969
The Open Championship		T32	T16	CUT	T34	T10	T50	T47	CUT	45

Tournament	1970	1971	1972	1973	1974
The Open Championship	T9	CUT	CUT	CUT	T56

Note: Panton only played in The Open Championship.

Top 10
Did not play

NT = No tournament
CUT = missed the half-way cut (3rd round cut in 1972 Open Championship)
"T" indicates a tie for a place

== Team appearances ==
- Ryder Cup (representing Great Britain): 1951, 1953, 1961
- World Cup (representing Scotland): 1955, 1956, 1957, 1958, 1959, 1960, 1961, 1962, 1963, 1964, 1965, 1966, 1968
- Joy Cup (representing the British Isles): 1954 (winners), 1956 (winners)
- Amateurs–Professionals Match (representing the Professionals): 1956 (winners)
- R.T.V. International Trophy (representing Scotland): 1967 (captain)
