= Alfonso Angelini =

Italian professional golfer

Personal information
- Nickname: Lillo
- Nationality: Italy
- Born: 1918
- Died: 1995 (aged 76–77)

Career
- Sport: Golf
- Status: Professional
- Professional wins: 19

Best results in major championships
- Masters Tournament: CUT: 1964
- PGA Championship: DNP
- U.S. Open: DNP
- The Open Championship: T12: 1954

Alfonso Angelini (1918–1995) was an Italian professional golfer and instructor after World War II.

Angelini won the Italian Native Open eleven times between 1947 and 1969. He was also runner-up at the Italian Open in 1950 (lost playoff to Ugo Grappasonni), 1952, 1958 and 1959. He won his first international tournament when he beat Gerard de Wit in the playoff at the Dutch Open in 1955. He also won the Swiss Open in 1957 and 1966 and the Portuguese Open in 1962 and 1966. In 1968 he played the World Cup in Rome with Roberto Bernardini, finishing third behind Canada and the United States. He played The Open Championship six times, finishing 12th in 1954.

Angelini lost to Ken Bousfield in a playoff for the 1972 PGA Seniors Championship at Longniddry, Scotland. He took a bogey 5 at the first extra hole to Bousfield's par 4.

Angelini and Grappasonni were teaching pros at the Golf Club Villa d'Este. Together with Aldo Casera they founded the Professional Golfer's Association of Italy in 1962. The three men were known as the "three musketeers".

== Professional wins ==
this list may be incomplete

- 1945 Rome Open
- 1947 Italian Native Open
- 1951 Italian Native Open
- 1952 Italian Native Open
- 1953 Italian Native Open
- 1955 Dutch Open
- 1957 Swiss Open
- 1958 Italian Native Open
- 1959 Italian Native Open
- 1961 Italian Native Open
- 1962 Portuguese Open, Italian Native Open
- 1964 Italian Native Open
- 1965 Italian Native Open
- 1966 Swiss Open, Portuguese Open
- 1968 Lancia d'Oro
- 1969 Italian Native Open
- 1970 Lancia d'Oro

== Results in major championships ==
| Tournament | 1951 | 1952 | 1953 | 1954 | 1955 | 1956 | 1957 | 1958 | 1959 |
|---|---|---|---|---|---|---|---|---|---|
| Masters Tournament | | | | | | | | | |
| The Open Championship | CUT | | | T12 | CUT | T31 | CUT | CUT | |

| Tournament | 1960 | 1961 | 1962 | 1963 | 1964 |
|---|---|---|---|---|---|
| Masters Tournament | | | | | CUT |
| The Open Championship | | | | | |

Note: Angelini never played in the U.S. Open nor the PGA Championship.

Did not play

CUT = missed the half-way cut
"T" indicates a tie for a place

== Team appearances ==
- Continental Europe–United States: (representing Continental Europe): 1953
- Joy Cup: (representing the Rest of Europe): 1954, 1955, 1958
- World Cup (representing Italy): 1955, 1956, 1957, 1958, 1959, 1960, 1961, 1962, 1963, 1964, 1965, 1968, 1969
