= Ángel Miguel =

Spanish golfer

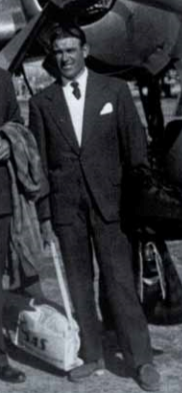

Personal information
- Full name: Ángel Miguel
- Nationality: Spain
- Born: 27 December 1929 Madrid, Spain
- Died: 13 April 2009 (aged 79) Marbella, Spain

Career
- Sport: Golf
- Status: Professional
- Former tour: European Tour
- Professional wins: 22

Best results in major championships
- Masters Tournament: T25: 1959
- PGA Championship: DNP
- U.S. Open: DNP
- The Open Championship: 4th: 1957

Ángel Miguel (27 December 1929 – 13 April 2009) was a Spanish professional golfer. He is often regarded as one of the pioneers of golf in Spain.

== Career ==
In 1929, Miguel was born in Madrid, Spain.

Miguel won 12 major tournaments around the world during the 1950s and 1960s, including the Spanish Open in 1961 and 1964, the French Open in 1956 and the Portuguese Open on three occasions. He also won the Spanish Professionals Championship a record six times.

Miguel represented his country in the Canada Cup on nine occasions. He claimed the individual honours in 1958, and also finished as runners-up in the team event paired with his brother Sebastián, who also had a successful professional career.

Miguel performed well in The Open Championship, twice finishing in the top ten, with a best of 4th place in 1957. In the 1961 Open he tied for 14th alongside his brother. He also played in the Masters several times, but only made the halfway cut once, in 1959, when he went on to finish in a tie for 25th place.

== Professional wins ==
- 1953 Spanish Professionals Championship
- 1954 Portuguese Open, Spanish Professionals Championship, Open de Cataluña, Alexandria Open
- 1955 Spanish Professionals Championship, Morocco Open
- 1956 Open de France, Portuguese Open
- 1957 Spanish Professionals Championship
- 1958 Canada Cup (individual title)
- 1959 Mexican Open
- 1961 Spanish Open
- 1962 Argentine Open
- 1963 Spanish Professionals Championship
- 1964 Spanish Open, Portuguese Open, Gevacolor Tournament
- 1965 Swallow-Penfold Tournament, Spanish Professionals Championship, Dutch Open
- 1966 Agfa-Gevaert Tournament

== Results in major championships ==
Tournament	1955	1956	1957	1958	1959	1960	1961	1962	1963	1964	1965
Masters Tournament					T25	CUT	CUT	CUT	CUT		
The Open Championship	CUT	T13	4	29	T38	T16	T14			T8	CUT

Note: Miguel only played in the Masters Tournament and The Open Championship.

Top 10
Did not play

CUT = missed the half-way cut
"T" indicates a tie for a place

== Team appearances ==
- Canada Cup (representing Spain): 1955, 1956, 1957, 1958 (individual winner), 1959, 1960, 1962, 1964, 1965
- Joy Cup (representing the Rest of Europe): 1954, 1955, 1956, 1958
