= Joy Cup =

Tournament information
- Established: 1954
- Format: Team match play
- Final year: 1958

Final champion
- British Isles

The Joy Cup was an annual men's professional team golf competition between teams representing the British Isles and the Rest of Europe. It was played from 1954 to 1958. The British Isles won all four contests that were played. The trophy was provided by the Jean Patou company and named after Joy perfume that they produced. The concept of a match between Great Britain/Ireland and Continental Europe was revived with the Hennessy Cognac Cup in 1974.

== Format ==
The cup was contested over two days with 36-hole foursomes on the first day and 36-hole singles matches on the second day. Generally there were 5 foursomes and 10 singles except that in 1956 there were only 4 foursomes and 8 singles.

== History ==
Originally the Rest of Europe team was selected by the European Golf Association while the British team was selected and captain by Henry Cotton. In early 1957, the EGA agreed with the PGA that the PGA would take over from Cotton. A match was planned for 19 and 20 October 1957 in Barcelona but was not held, the 1957 Ryder Cup and the Canada Cup being held in the same month.

In January 1960 it was announced that the Joy Cup had been discontinued. The Jean Patou company withdrew the gold cup that the winners had received.

== Results ==
| Year | Dates | Venue | Winners | Score | British Isles captain | Rest of Europe captain | Ref |
|---|---|---|---|---|---|---|---|
| 1954 | 13–14 November | Saint-Cloud, France | British Isles | 10 1/2–4 1/2 | Henry Cotton | Flory Van Donck | |
| 1955 | 24–25 September | Royal Lytham, England | British Isles | 9–6 | Henry Cotton (non-playing) | Flory Van Donck | |
| 1956 | 6–7 October | Royal Antwerp, Belgium | British Isles | 9 1/2–2 1/2 | Henry Cotton | Flory Van Donck | |
| 1957 | 19–20 October | Barcelona, Spain | Cancelled | | | | |
| 1958 | 22–23 October | Madrid, Spain | British Isles | 9 1/2–5 1/2 | Dai Rees | Flory Van Donck | |

== Appearances ==
The following are those who played in at least one of the four matches.

=== British Isles ===
- (England) Peter Alliss 1954, 1955, 1956, 1958
- (England) Ken Bousfield 1955, 1958
- (Republic of Ireland) Harry Bradshaw 1954, 1955, 1956, 1958
- (Scotland) Eric Brown 1954, 1955, 1956, 1958
- (England) Henry Cotton 1954, 1956
- (Northern Ireland) Fred Daly 1954, 1955
- (England) Bernard Hunt 1958
- (England) John Jacobs 1954, 1955, 1958
- (England) Eric Lester 1956
- (England) Peter Mills 1956, 1958
- (Republic of Ireland) Christy O'Connor Snr 1955, 1956, 1958
- (Scotland) John Panton 1954, 1956
- (Wales) Dai Rees 1954, 1955, 1958
- (England) Syd Scott 1954, 1955, 1956
- (England) Harry Weetman 1954, 1955, 1956, 1958

=== Rest of Europe ===
- (France) Jean Baptiste Ado 1954, 1958
- (France) Michel Alsuguren 1954
- (Italy) Alfonso Angelini 1954, 1955, 1958
- (West Germany) Georg Bessner 1954, 1955
- (Italy) Ovidio Bolognesi 1956
- (Italy) Aldo Casera 1954, 1955, 1956, 1958
- (Spain) Carlos Celles 1955, 1956, 1958
- (France) Roger Cotton 1958
- (Netherlands) Gerard de Wit 1955, 1956
- (France) Jean Garaïalde 1954, 1955, 1958
- (Italy) Ugo Grappasonni 1954, 1955, 1956
- (Spain) Ángel Miguel 1954, 1955, 1956, 1958
- (Spain) Sebastián Miguel 1954, 1956, 1958
- (France) François Saubaber 1954, 1955
- (Spain) Ramón Sota 1958
- (Belgium) Donald Swaelens 1958
- (Belgium) Flory Van Donck 1954, 1955, 1956, 1958
