= Nick Littlehales =

English sleep coach and golfer

Nick Littlehales is an English sleep coach.

== Career ==
Littlehales is a former golfer with Little Aston Golf Club from 1978 and 1983. After that, he worked at the Oldham factory of mattress company Slumberland. After that, he became chairman of the UK Sleep Council.

Littlehales started his sports sleep coach career as a football sleep coach with English Premier League side Manchester United. Before Euro 2004, the Football Association appointed Littlehales to set up team hotel rooms for recovery purposes. After that, he started working as a cycling sleep coach. After that, his clients included Red Bull's Formula One team, Unilever, and staff of various museums.
