= Ramón Sota =

Spanish golfer

Personal information
- Full name: Ramón Sota Ocejo
- Nationality: Spain
- Born: 23 April 1938 Pedreña, Cantabria
- Died: 28 August 2012 (aged 74) Pedreña, Cantabria

Career
- Sport: Golf
- Status: Professional
- Former tours: European Tour; European Seniors Tour
- Professional wins: 16

Best results in major championships
- Masters Tournament: T6: 1965
- PGA Championship: DNP
- U.S. Open: DNP
- The Open Championship: T7: 1963

Ramón Sota Ocejo (23 April 1938 – 28 August 2012) was a Spanish professional golfer.

== Career ==
Sota was born in Pedreña, Cantabria. He won many professional tournaments around the world including some of the major national opens around Europe that formed the basis of the European Tour when it was formed in 1972. Those wins included his own national open, three Portuguese Opens, and the French Open. He recorded several victories farther afield, including winning the Brazil Open in 1965. He was also Spanish professional champion four times.

In 1965, Sota finished 6th at the U.S. Masters, which at the time was the best performance in the tournament by any European. He finished 10th on the European Order of Merit in 1971, the year prior to the official start of the new European Tour. He only competed on the tour for one season, in 1972. During that season's Double Diamond International he became the first player ever to be penalised for slow play in Britain. The humiliation he felt following the incident led him to retire shortly afterwards, although he did return to play on the European Seniors Tour for a few years in the mid 1990s.

Sota started the Club de Golf Ramon Sota in Marina de Cudeyo, which has a 9-hole par–3 course and a golf school. He was also the uncle of Spain's most successful golfer, Seve Ballesteros.

Sota died in August 2012 of pneumonia.

== Professional wins ==
This list may be incomplete

- 1956 Spanish Professional Championship
- 1959 Spanish Professional Championship
- 1960 Spanish Professional Championship
- 1961 Spanish Professional Championship
- 1963 Spanish Open, Portuguese Open
- 1965 French Open, Brazil Open
- 1966 Dutch Open, Puerto Rico Open
- 1969 Portuguese Open, Madrid Open
- 1970 Portuguese Open
- 1971 Algarve Open, Italian Open, Dutch Open

== Results in major championships ==
Tournament	1958	1959	1960	1961	1962	1963	1964	1965	1966	1967	1968	1969	1970	1971	1972
Masters Tournament							T34	T6	T33	T31		CUT			CUT
The Open Championship	CUT	CUT	15	12	CUT	T7	T30	T25						T11	CUT

Note: Sota only played in the Masters Tournament and The Open Championship.

Top 10
Did not play

CUT = missed the half-way cut
"T" indicates a tie for a place

== Team appearances ==
- World Cup (representing Spain): 1961, 1963, 1964, 1965, 1967, 1968, 1969, 1970, 1971
- Joy Cup (representing the Rest of Europe): 1958
- Double Diamond International (representing Continental Europe): 1972 (captain)
