= Stan Leonard =

Canadian professional golfer (1915–2005)

Personal information
- Nationality: Canada
- Born: February 2, 1915 Vancouver, British Columbia
- Died: December 15, 2005 (aged 90) Vancouver, British Columbia
- Height: 5 ft 6 in (168 cm)

Career
- Sport: Golf
- Turned professional: 1938
- Former tours: Canadian Tour; PGA Tour
- Professional wins: 44

Number of wins by tour
- PGA Tour: 3

Best results in major championships
- Masters Tournament: T4: 1958, 1959
- PGA Championship: DNP
- U.S. Open: T25: 1962
- The Open Championship: CUT: 1956

Stan Leonard (February 2, 1915 – December 15, 2005) was a Canadian professional golfer who played on the PGA Tour in the 1950s and 1960s. Leonard won three PGA Tour events, eight Canadian PGA Championships, and 16 other significant events in Canada. He is a member of the Canadian Golf Hall of Fame.

== Early life and amateur career ==
Leonard was born in Vancouver, British Columbia. He worked as a caddie, and had success in top British Columbia events.

In 1937, he won the Northwest Open, a significant event in the United States, as an amateur.

== Professional career ==
In 1938, Leonard turned pro. He played almost exclusively, and very successfully, on the Canadian Professional Golf Tour until 1954, while concurrently maintaining a club job at the Marine Drive Golf Club in Vancouver. He competed mainly in western Canada; money was tight, prize money was low, and travel costs to eastern Canada were high. In one of his early events on the PGA Tour, Leonard challenged to win the 1946 Crosby Pro-Am in California, before losing to Lloyd Mangrum.

Leonard won the Canadian PGA Championship eight times from 1940–1961, and this is a record. He was the low Canadian in the Canadian Open nine times from 1945–1961. He won the British Columbia Open five times, the Alberta Open nine times, and the Saskatchewan Open twice. He won a total of six significant amateur and 40 professional tournaments in Canada over the course of his career – second only to Moe Norman in Canadian golf history.

Leonard won the individual title at the Canada Cup in both 1954 and 1959. Leonard joined the PGA Tour full-time in 1954, at age 39. He won three PGA Tour events between 1957 and 1960. He enjoyed a great deal of success in one major tournament – The Masters. His best finishes at the Augusta National Golf Club were T-4 in 1958 and 1959, T-8 in 1955 and T-9 in 1960. Leonard's game was respected by his PGA Tour rivals; legend Sam Snead said that he was glad Leonard had not come out onto the PGA Tour full-time until he was 40 years old!

Leonard retired from the PGA Tour in the 1960s, and took a club pro job at the Desert Island Golf Club in Palm Springs, California; however, he eventually made his way back home to Vancouver. He competed successfully at the Senior level in Canada, winning three Canadian Senior PGA Championships between 1967 and 1975.

He assisted in designing the Redwood Meadows Golf Course, in Bragg Creek, Alberta, near Calgary.

Leonard was one of the best ball strikers and longest hitters of his era, despite being a diminutive 5' 6" in height. Part of his powerful swing could be attributed to his massive forearms. The other players noticed this physical feature and gave him the nickname Popeye.

== Personal life ==
Leonard died of heart failure in Vancouver at the age of 90.

== Awards and honors ==
- In 1964, Leonard was inducted into Canada's Sports Hall of Fame
- In 1966, Leonard was inducted into the BC Sports Hall of Fame
- In 1972, Leonard was inducted into the Canadian Golf Hall of Fame

== Amateur wins ==
- 1932 British Columbia Amateur
- 1934 Vancouver & Dist. Championship
- 1935 British Columbia Amateur
- 1936 Vancouver & Dist. Championship

== Professional wins (44) ==
=== PGA Tour wins (3) ===
No.	Date	Tournament	Winning score	Margin of victory	Runner-up
1	Apr 14, 1957	Greater Greensboro Open	−4 (72-68-67-69=276)	3 strokes	(United States) Mike Souchak
2	Apr 27, 1958	Tournament of Champions	−13 (69-69-69-68=275)	1 stroke	(United States) Billy Casper
3	Jul 17, 1960	Western Open	−10 (71-68-71-68=278)	Playoff	(United States) Art Wall Jr.

PGA Tour playoff record (1–1)

No.	Year	Tournament	Opponent	Result
1	1955	Labatt Open	(United States) Gene Littler	Lost to par on first extra hole
2	1960	Western Open	(United States) Art Wall Jr.	Won with birdie on first extra hole

=== Canadian wins (34) ===
This list may be incomplete

- 1937 (1) Alberta Open
- 1939 (1) Alberta Open
- 1940 (1) Canadian PGA Championship
- 1941 (2) Alberta Open, Canadian PGA Championship
- 1942 (1) Alberta Open
- 1943 (1) Alberta Open
- 1947 (2) Alberta Open, British Columbia Open
- 1948 (1) Vancouver City Match Play Championship
- 1949 (3) Alberta Open, British Columbia Open, Vancouver City Match Play Championship
- 1950 (6) Alberta Open, Canadian PGA Championship, British Columbia Open, Vancouver City Match Play Championship, Saskatchewan Open, Western Canada Open
- 1951 (1) Canadian PGA Championship
- 1953 (1) Vancouver City Match Play Championship
- 1954 (3) Canadian PGA Championship, British Columbia Open, Vancouver City Match Play Championship
- 1955 (2) Alberta Open, Saskatchewan Open
- 1956 (1) Canadian Match Play
- 1957 (1) Canadian PGA Championship
- 1959 (1) Canadian PGA Championship
- 1960 (1) Canadian Match Play Open
- 1961 (1) Canadian PGA Championship
- 1962 (1) British Columbia Open

=== Other wins (4) ===
- 1937 Northwest Open (as an amateur)
- 1938 Tacoma Jubilee
- 1959 Canada Cup (individual event)
- 1960 Northwest Open

=== Senior wins (3) ===
- 1967 Canadian PGA Seniors' Championship
- 1972 Canadian PGA Seniors' Championship
- 1975 Canadian PGA Seniors' Championship

== Results in major championships ==
Tournament	1952	1953	1954	1955	1956	1957	1958	1959	1960	1961	1962	1963	1964	1965
Masters Tournament	T34			T8	T24	T11	T4	T4	T9	T15	CUT	T21	CUT	CUT
U.S. Open						T32			CUT		T25	CUT		
The Open Championship					CUT									

Note: Leonard never played in the PGA Championship.

Top 10
Did not play

CUT = missed the half-way cut
"T" indicates a tie for a place

=== Summary ===
Tournament	Wins	2nd	3rd	Top-5	Top-10	Top-25	Events	Cuts made
Masters Tournament	0	0	0	2	4	8	12	9
U.S. Open	0	0	0	0	0	1	4	2
The Open Championship	0	0	0	0	0	0	1	0
PGA Championship	0	0	0	0	0	0	0	0
Totals	0	0	0	2	4	9	17	11

- Most consecutive cuts made – 6 (1957 Masters – 1961 Masters)
- Longest streak of top-10s – 3 (1958 Masters – 1960 Masters)

== Team appearances ==
- Canada Cup (representing Canada): 1953, 1954, 1955, 1956, 1957, 1959 (individual winner), 1960, 1963
- Hopkins Trophy (representing Canada): 1952, 1953, 1954, 1955, 1956
