= Flory Van Donck =

Belgian professional golfer (1912–1992)

Personal information
- Full name: Flory Van Donck
- Nationality: Belgium
- Born: 23 June 1912 Tervuren, Belgium
- Died: 14 January 1992 (aged 79)
- Spouse: Maria-Hendrika Renneboog
- Children: Marc, Claudine

Career
- Sport: Golf
- Turned professional: c. 1931
- Professional wins: 60

Best results in major championships
- Masters Tournament: T32: 1958
- PGA Championship: DNP
- U.S. Open: DNP
- The Open Championship: 2nd/T2: 1956, 1959

Achievements and awards
- Harry Vardon Trophy: 1953
- Trophée National du Mérite Sportif: 1960

Flory Van Donck (23 June 1912 – 14 January 1992) was a Belgian professional golfer. He is widely regarded as the greatest ever Belgian golfer. During his career, he won more than 50 tournaments worldwide, including many of the most prestigious national opens of Europe. Van Donck also finished as runner up in The Open Championship on two occasions.

== Early life ==
Van Donck was born in Tervuren, Flemish Brabant on 23 June 1912.

== Professional career ==
In the early 1930s, Van Donck turned pro. Van Donck was one of the few golfers from continental Europe of the era who had been able to win regularly in professional tournaments in Britain. Much of Van Donck's fame rested on his great putting ability, though his style was unorthodox as he kept the toe of his putter in the air, similar to Isao Aoki.

Van Donck held most of the national open titles in Europe at one time or another, including the Belgian Open and Dutch Open (five times each), Italian Open (four times), French Open (three times), German Open and Swiss Open (twice each), and Portuguese Open (once). In 1953 he won a total of seven tournaments on the European circuit, a record he still shares with Norman Von Nida who achieved the feat in 1947, and was awarded the Harry Vardon Trophy.

In addition to his victories around Europe, Van Donck dominated in his home country, winning the Belgian national title sixteen times between 1935 and 1968 and the Professional Tournament of the Alliance on ten occasions. In 1960 he was awarded the Trophée National du Mérite Sportif, the highest honour that is awarded to Belgian sportsmen in recognition of his achievements.

Van Donck was runner up in The Open Championship twice. In 1956 at Hoylake, he finished three strokes behind Peter Thomson, and in 1959 at Muirfield he finished alongside Fred Bullock two strokes adrift of Gary Player. Such was his consistency, he did not finish outside the top five for five years succession from 1955, and finished inside the top 10 eight years out of ten during the 1950s.

He represented Belgium in the Canada Cup, latterly the World Cup, on 19 occasions. His last appearance was in 1979 as a 67-year-old, when he became the oldest player ever to participate in the World Cup. In 1960, he was the lowest-scoring player (for the International Trophy) at Portmarnock in Ireland, from a field that included some of the sports all-time greats, such as Sam Snead, Arnold Palmer, Bobby Locke, Gary Player, Peter Thomson and Kel Nagle.

== Tournament wins (60) ==
this list is incomplete

- 1936 Dutch Open
- 1937 Dutch Open
- 1938 Italian Open
- 1939 Belgian Open
- 1946 Belgian Open, Dutch Open
- 1947 Manchester Evening Chronicle Tournament, Belgian Open, Italian Open
- 1951 Dutch Open, Silver King Tournament, North British-Harrogate Tournament
- 1952 Southern Professional Championship
- 1953 Belgian Open, Dutch Open, German Open, Italian Open, Swiss Open, Silver King Tournament, Yorkshire Evening News Tournament
- 1954 French Open, Uruguayan International Golf Championship
- 1955 Italian Open, Portuguese Open, Swiss Open
- 1956 Belgian Open, German Open
- 1957 French Open, Venezuela Open (Feb)
- 1958 French Open
- 1960 Canada Cup (individual title), Omnium of Belgium
- 1962 Lancia d'Oro
- 1963 Omnium of Belgium
- 1964 Omnium of Belgium
- 1965 Omnium of Belgium
- 1966 Omnium of Belgium
- 1968 Omnium of Belgium
- Belgian Professional Championship: 16 wins
- Professional Tournament of the Alliance: 10 wins

== Results in major championships ==
Tournament	1938	1939
Masters Tournament		
The Open Championship	CUT	

Tournament	1940	1941	1942	1943	1944	1945	1946	1947	1948	1949
Masters Tournament				NT	NT	NT				
The Open Championship	NT	NT	NT	NT	NT	NT	T28	T21	T7	CUT

Tournament	1950	1951	1952	1953	1954	1955	1956	1957	1958	1959
Masters Tournament									T32	
The Open Championship	T9	T24	7	T20	T10	T5	2	T5	T5	T2

Note: Van Donck only played in the Masters Tournament and The Open Championship.

Top 10
Did not play

NT = No tournament
CUT = missed the half-way cut
"T" indicates a tie for a place

== Team appearances ==
- World Cup (representing Belgium): 1954, 1955, 1956, 1957, 1958, 1959, 1960 (individual winner), 1961, 1962, 1963, 1964, 1965, 1966, 1967, 1968, 1969, 1970, 1972, 1979
- Joy Cup: (representing the Rest of Europe): 1954, 1955, 1956, 1958
