= Bob Panasik =

Canadian professional golfer (1941–2023)

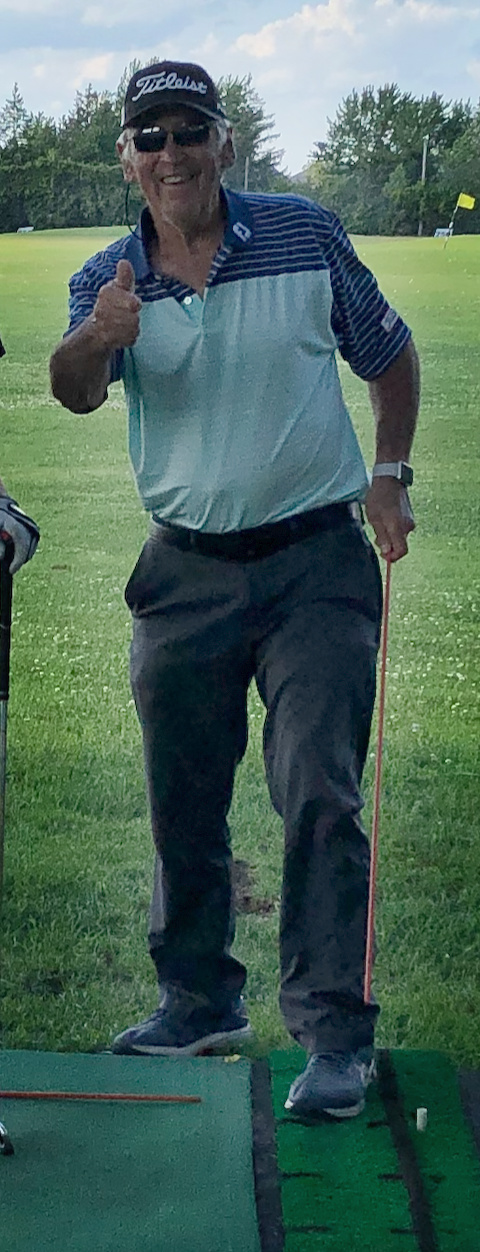
- Panasik in 2020

Personal information
- Full name: Robert R. Panasik
- Nickname: Panny
- Nationality: Canada
- Born: October 20, 1941 Windsor, Ontario, Canada
- Died: December 27, 2023 (aged 82)
- Height: 6 ft 0 in (1.83 m)

Career
- Sport: Golf
- Status: Professional
- Former tours: Canadian Tour; Champions Tour
- Professional wins: 27

Best results in major championships
- Masters Tournament: DNP
- PGA Championship: DNP
- U.S. Open: 42nd: 1964
- The Open Championship: DNP

Achievements and awards
- Peter Jackson Tour Order of Merit winner: 1974, 1975
- Canadian Golf Hall of Fame: 2005

Robert R. Panasik (né Panasiuk; October 20, 1941 – December 27, 2023) was a Canadian professional golfer.

== Early life ==
Born in Windsor, Ontario, he was known as Panasiuk until 1970 when he changed his name to Panasik so it would be "easier to pronounce".

In 1957, at the age of 15, Panasik made the halfway cut in the Canadian Open to become the youngest player ever to play all four rounds in a PGA Tour event, a record which stood until April 2013 when his record was broken by Guan Tianlang.

== Professional career ==
Panasik went on to win the Canadian PGA Championship twice as well as many provincial tournaments in Canada. He also qualified for the U.S. Open on several occasions and represented Canada in three World Cups.

Panasik continued his success as a senior, playing one full season on the Senior PGA Tour in 1994. Back in Canada, he has won the Canadian PGA Seniors Championship three times and the Super Seniors Championship twice.

== Death ==
Panasik died on December 27, 2023, at the age of 82.

== Awards and honors ==
- In 1974 and 1975, Panasik earned the Order of Merit for the Peter Jackson Tour.
- In 2005, Panasik was inducted into the Canadian Golf Hall of Fame.

== Amateur wins ==
- 1958 Canadian Junior Championship
- 1959 Ontario Amateur Championship

== Professional wins (27) ==
=== Canadian Tour wins (2) ===
No.	Date	Tournament	Winning score	Margin of victory	Runner(s)-up
1	Aug 24, 1986	Manitoba Open	−6 (69-66-69=204)	Playoff	(Canada) Dan Halldorson, (Canada) Daniel Talbot
2	Sep 7, 1986	Payless Canadian Tournament Players Championship	−12 (66-69-66=201)	5 strokes	(Canada) Dave Barr

=== Other wins (19) ===
- 1962 Ontario PGA Assistants Championship
- 1963 Ontario PGA Assistants Championship
- 1968 Michigan PGA Assistants Championship
- 1970 Michigan PGA Assistants Championship
- 1972 Canadian PGA Championship, Waterloo Open Golf Classic
- 1973 Canadian PGA Championship, Newfoundland Open
- 1974 Quebec Open, Saskatchewan Open, Alberta Open
- 1975 Alberta Open
- 1979 Ontario PGA Championship, Ontario Spring Open
- 1981 Canadian PGA Club Professionals Championship
- 1984 Ontario PGA Championship
- 1987 Ontario Spring Open
- 1993 Canadian PGA Club Professionals Championship
- 2002 Ontario Spring Open

=== Senior wins (6) ===
- 1997 Canadian PGA Seniors Championship
- 1998 Canadian PGA Seniors Championship, Ontario PGA Seniors Championship
- 2001 Canadian PGA Seniors Championship
- 2003 Canadian PGA Super Seniors Championship
- 2004 Canadian PGA Super Seniors Championship

== Team appearances ==
- World Cup (representing Canada): 1972, 1973, 1975

== See also ==
- 1968 APG Tour Qualifying School graduates
