= Billy Kratzert =

American professional golfer (born 1952)

Personal information
- Full name: William August Kratzert III
- Nickname: Bill or Billy
- Nationality: United States
- Born: June 29, 1952 (age 74) Quantico, Virginia, U.S.
- Height: 6 ft 1 in (1.85 m)
- Weight: 205 lb (93 kg; 14.6 st)

Career
- Sport: Golf
- College: University of Georgia
- Turned professional: 1974
- Former tours: PGA Tour; Champions Tour
- Professional wins: 5

Number of wins by tour
- PGA Tour: 4

Best results in major championships
- Masters Tournament: T5: 1978
- PGA Championship: T12: 1978
- U.S. Open: T6: 1978
- The Open Championship: CUT: 1978

William August Kratzert III (born June 29, 1952) is an American professional golfer and sportscaster, who has played on both the PGA Tour and the Champions Tour.

== Early life ==
Kratzert was born in Quantico, Virginia when his father was in the service but spent most of his youth in Fort Wayne, Indiana, where he attended Elmhurst High School. His father was head pro for over 20 years at the Fort Wayne Country Club. Kratzert won the Indiana State Amateur at age 16.

== Amateur career ==
Kratzert attended the University of Georgia in Athens, Georgia. He was a distinguished member of the golf team and an All-American in 1973 and 1974. Kratzert graduated with a Bachelor of Business Administration (BBA) degree in 1974. He turned pro in that same year. Kratzert, after two failed attempts at earning his Tour card, quit golf and worked as a forklift operator. After eight months at that job, Kratzert returned to golf and succeeded on his third attempt in 1976 to get his PGA Tour card.

== Professional career ==
Kratzert won four PGA Tour events in his career. His most successful years in professional golf were 1977–1980 when he finished in the top-12 on the money list in three of those 4 years. Kratzert's best year for majors was 1978, when he finished with a T-5 in The Masters and a T-6 in the U.S. Open. His career earnings exceed $1.4 million. He continued to play on the PGA Tour until 1997, when he went to work as a television golf commentator.

Since turning 50 in June 2002, Kratzert has played some on the Champions Tour with his best finish a T10 at the 2003 Royal Caribbean Golf Classic.

Kratzert has worked for many years as a TV golf analyst for outlets such as the Golf Channel, ESPN, CBS, NBC, Turner Sports, SiriusXM PGA Tour Radio and pgatour.com.

== Personal life ==
He lives in Ponte Vedra Beach, Florida with his wife and three children. His sister, Cathy Gerring, is also a professional golfer and has won three times on the LPGA Tour.

== Awards and honors ==
In 1993, Kratzert was inducted into the Indiana Golf Hall of Fame.

== Amateur wins ==
- 1968 Indiana Amateur

== Professional wins (5) ==
=== PGA Tour wins (4) ===
No.	Date	Tournament	Winning score	Margin of victory	Runner(s)-up
1	Nov 7, 1976	Walt Disney World National Team Championship (with (United States) Woody Blackburn)	−28 (63-68-63-66=260)	Playoff	(United States) Gay Brewer and (United States) Bobby Nichols
2	Aug 7, 1977	Sammy Davis Jr.-Greater Hartford Open	−19 (66-66-64-69=265)	3 strokes	(United States) Grier Jones, (United States) Larry Nelson
3	Jul 13, 1980	Greater Milwaukee Open	−22 (67-66-67-66=266)	4 strokes	(United States) Howard Twitty
4	Oct 28, 1984	Pensacola Open	−14 (67-66-71-66=270)	2 strokes	(Scotland) Ken Brown, (United States) John Mahaffey

PGA Tour playoff record (1–1)

No.	Year	Tournament	Opponent(s)	Result
1	1976	Walt Disney World National Team Championship (with (United States) Woody Blackburn)	(United States) Gay Brewer and (United States) Bobby Nichols	Won with birdie on third extra hole
2	1978	Hawaiian Open	(United States) Hubert Green	Lost to par on second extra hole

=== Other wins ===
- 1970 Indiana Open (as an amateur)

== Results in major championships ==
Tournament	1974	1975	1976	1977	1978	1979	1980	1981	1982	1983	1984	1985	1986
Masters Tournament	CUT			T24	T5	T17	T19	CUT				T14	T42
U.S. Open		CUT		T19	T6	T36		T33					
The Open Championship					CUT								
PGA Championship				T25	T12	CUT	T50	CUT	CUT			T40	

Top 10
Did not play

CUT = missed the halfway cut
"T" indicates a tie for a place.

== See also ==
- Spring 1976 PGA Tour Qualifying School graduates
- 1993 PGA Tour Qualifying School graduates
