= 1979 Open Championship =

Coordinates: 53.7495°N 3.018°W

Tournament information
- Dates: 18–21 July 1979
- Location: Lancashire, England
- Course: Royal Lytham & St Annes; Golf Club
- Tour(s): European Tour; PGA Tour

Statistics
- Par: 71
- Length: 6,822 yards (6,238 m)
- Field: 152 players 82 after 1st cut 61 after 2nd cut
- Cut: 152 (+10) (1st cut); 227 (+14) (2nd cut)
- Prize fund: £155,000 $325,000
- Winner's share: £15,000 $31,500

Champion
- (Spain) Seve Ballesteros
- 283 (−1)

Location in England
Location in Lancashire. England

The 1979 Open Championship was the 108th Open Championship, held 18–21 July at Royal Lytham & St Annes Golf Club in Lancashire, England. Seve Ballesteros, 22, won the first of his five major titles, three strokes ahead of runners-up Jack Nicklaus and Ben Crenshaw. It was the first of his three Open Championship victories; he raised the Claret Jug again in 1984 and 1988.

This was the last Open scheduled to end on Saturday; in 1980 it moved to a Sunday final round, similar to the other three majors.

== Course ==
| Hole | Yards | Par | Hole | Yards | Par |
|---|---|---|---|---|---|
| 1 | 206 | 3 | 10 | 334 | 4 |
| 2 | 436 | 4 | 11 | 542 | 5 |
| 3 | 458 | 4 | 12 | 201 | 3 |
| 4 | 393 | 4 | 13 | 339 | 4 |
| 5 | 212 | 3 | 14 | 445 | 4 |
| 6 | 486 | 5 | 15 | 468 | 4 |
| 7 | 551 | 5 | 16 | 356 | 4 |
| 8 | 394 | 4 | 17 | 453 | 4 |
| 9 | 162 | 3 | 18 | 386 | 4 |
| Out | 3,298 | 35 | In | 3,524 | 36 |
| Source: | | | Total | 6,822 | 71 |

Hole #6 was a par 4 in 2012.

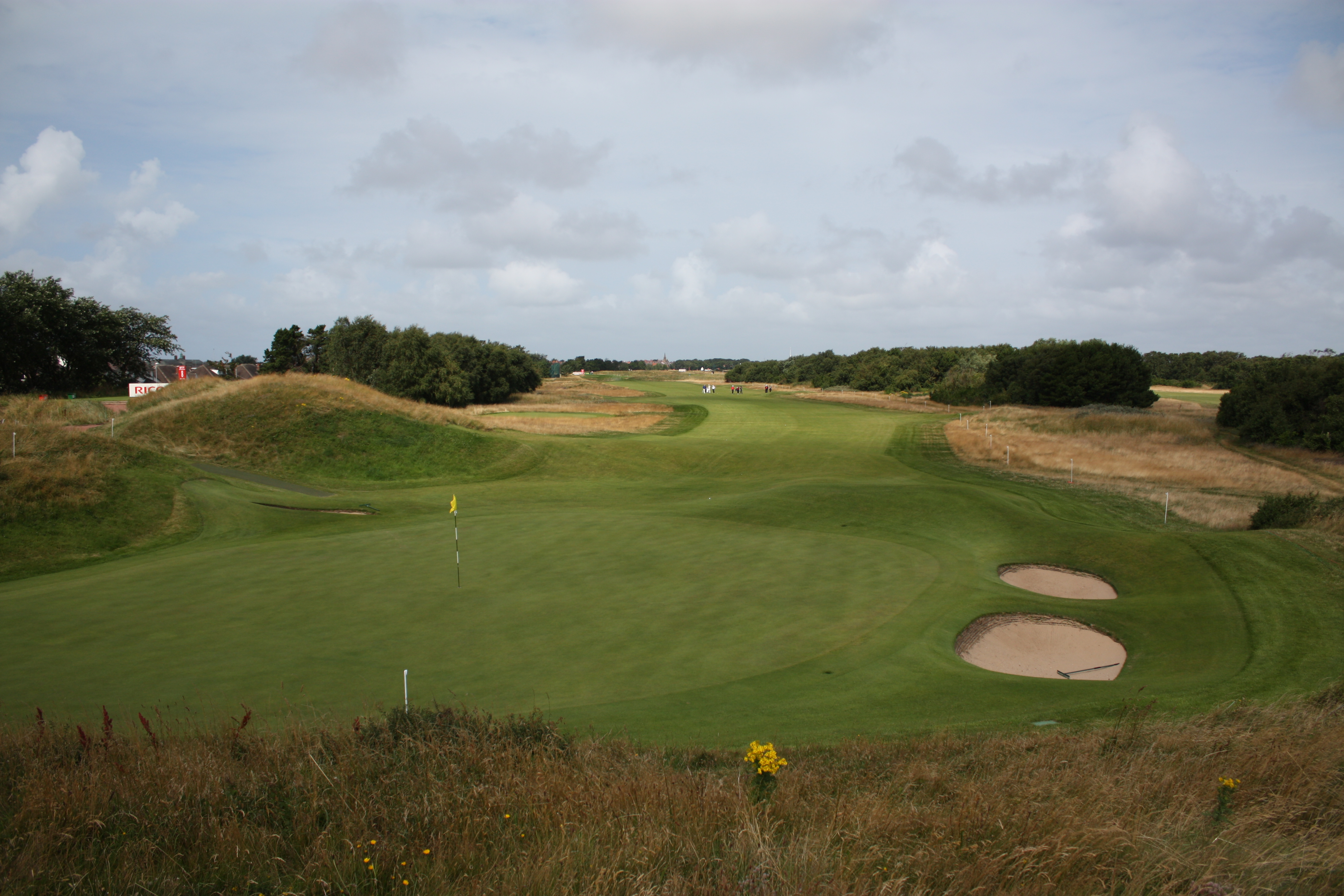
7th hole green in 2009

Lengths of the course for The Open Championship (since 1950):

- 1974: 6,822 yards (6,238 m), par 71
- 1969: 6,848 yards (6,262 m), par 71
- 1963: 6,836 yards (6,251 m), par 70
- 1958: 6,635 yards (6,067 m), par 71
- 1952: 6,657 yards (6,087 m)

== Round summaries ==
=== First round ===
Wednesday, 18 July 1979

| Place | Player | Score | To par |
|---|---|---|---|
| 1 | (Scotland) Bill Longmuir | 65 | −6 |
| 2 | (United States) Hale Irwin | 68 | −3 |
| 3 | (United States) Jerry Pate | 69 | −2 |
| 4 | (Japan) Isao Aoki | 70 | −1 |
| T5 | (Australia) Terry Gale | 71 | E |
| T5 | (England) Peter McEvoy (a) | 71 | E |
| T5 | (United States) Orville Moody | 71 | E |
| T5 | (United States) Lee Trevino | 71 | E |
| T9 | (South Africa) Hugh Baiocchi | 72 | +1 |
| T9 | (Scotland) Ken Brown | 72 | +1 |
| T9 | (New Zealand) Dennis Clark | 72 | +1 |
| T9 | (United States) Ben Crenshaw | 72 | +1 |
| T9 | (England) Gary Cullen | 72 | +1 |
| T9 | (United States) Jack Nicklaus | 72 | +1 |
| T9 | (United States) Tom Watson | 72 | +1 |

=== Second round ===
Thursday, 19 July 1979

| Place | Player | Score | To par |
|---|---|---|---|
| 1 | (United States) Hale Irwin | 68-68=136 | −6 |
| 2 | (Spain) Seve Ballesteros | 73-65=138 | −4 |
| 3 | (Scotland) Bill Longmuir | 65-74=139 | −3 |
| 4 | (United States) Tom Watson | 72-68=140 | −2 |
| T5 | (New Zealand) Dennis Clark | 72-69=141 | −1 |
| T5 | (United States) Jack Nicklaus | 72-69=141 | −1 |
| 7 | (Australia) Graham Marsh | 74-68=142 | E |
| T8 | (Scotland) Ken Brown | 72-71=143 | +1 |
| T8 | (United States) Bob Byman | 73-70=143 | +1 |
| T8 | (United States) Ben Crenshaw | 72-71=143 | +1 |
| T8 | (United States) Jerry Pate | 69-74=143 | +1 |

Amateurs: McEvoy (+3), Player (+8), Hallberg (+14), Hoad (+15),
Bennett (+17), Myers (+18), Guy (+20), Whelan (+23).

=== Third round ===
Friday, 20 July 1979

| Place | Player | Score | To par |
|---|---|---|---|
| 1 | (United States) Hale Irwin | 68-68-75=211 | −2 |
| 2 | (Spain) Seve Ballesteros | 73-65-75=213 | E |
| T3 | (England) Mark James | 76-69-69=214 | +1 |
| T3 | (United States) Jack Nicklaus | 72-69-73=214 | +1 |
| T5 | (Australia) Rodger Davis | 75-70-70=215 | +2 |
| T5 | (United States) Bob Byman | 73-70-72=215 | +2 |
| T5 | (United States) Ben Crenshaw | 72-71-72=215 | +2 |
| T8 | (Japan) Isao Aoki | 70-74-72=216 | +3 |
| T8 | (Australia) Greg Norman | 73-71-72=216 | +3 |
| T8 | (United States) Tom Watson | 72-68-76=216 | +3 |
| T8 | (Scotland) Bill Longmuir | 65-74-77=216 | +3 |

Amateurs: McEvoy (+4), Player (+19).

=== Final round ===
Saturday, 21 July 1979

| Place | Player | Score | To par | Money (£) |
|---|---|---|---|---|
| 1 | (Spain) Seve Ballesteros | 73-65-75-70=283 | −1 | 15,000 |
| T2 | (United States) Ben Crenshaw | 72-71-72-71=286 | +2 | 11,250 |
| T2 | (United States) Jack Nicklaus | 72-69-73-72=286 | +2 | 11,250 |
| 4 | (England) Mark James | 76-69-69-73=287 | +3 | 7,500 |
| 5 | (Australia) Rodger Davis | 75-70-70-73=288 | +4 | 6,500 |
| 6 | (United States) Hale Irwin | 68-68-75-78=289 | +5 | 6,000 |
| T7 | (Australia) Graham Marsh | 74-68-75-74=291 | +7 | 5,000 |
| T7 | (Japan) Isao Aoki | 70-74-72-75=291 | +7 | 5,000 |
| T7 | (United States) Bob Byman | 73-70-72-76=291 | +7 | 5,000 |
| T10 | (New Zealand) Bob Charles | 78-72-70-72=292 | +8 | 4,000 |
| T10 | (Japan) Masashi Ozaki | 75-69-75-73=292 | +8 | 4,000 |
| T10 | (Australia) Greg Norman | 73-71-72-76=292 | +8 | 4,000 |

- Amateurs: McEvoy (+10)
- The exchange rate at the time was approximately 2.30 dollars (US) per pound sterling.
