= Ernesto Pérez Acosta (golfer) =

Mexican professional golfer

Personal information
- Full name: Ernesto Pérez Acosta
- Nickname: "El Caballero"
- Nationality: Mexico
- Born: 14 June 1946 (age 80) Tijuana, Mexico
- Height: 5 ft 9 in (1.75 m)
- Spouse: Norma Virgen Díaz
- Children: Norma, Sandra, Ernesto Jr.

Career
- Sport: Golf
- Turned professional: 1970
- Professional wins: 70+

Best results in major championships
- Masters Tournament: DNP
- PGA Championship: DNP
- U.S. Open: WD: 1983
- The Open Championship: DNP

Ernesto Pérez Acosta (born 14 June 1946) is a Mexican professional golfer. He is considered one of Mexico's all-time top male professional golfers, sharing this merit with PGA Tour winners Victor Regalado, Abraham Ancer, Carlos Ortiz, Champions Tour winner Esteban Toledo, Mexico's all-time best amateur golfer Juan Antonio Estrada and international tour player Rafael Alarcón.

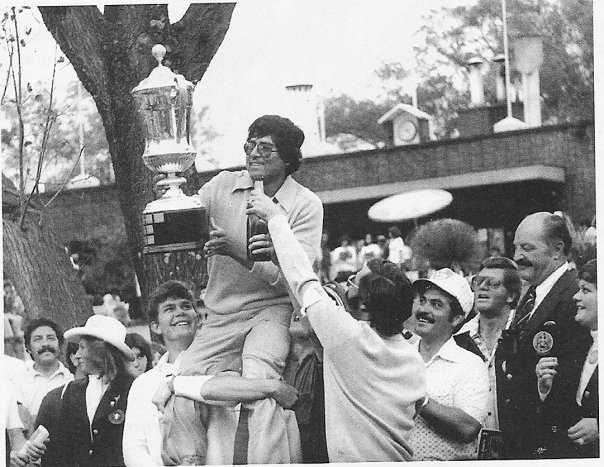
Ernesto Pérez Acosta winning The 1976 Mexican Open at Club de Golf La Hacienda

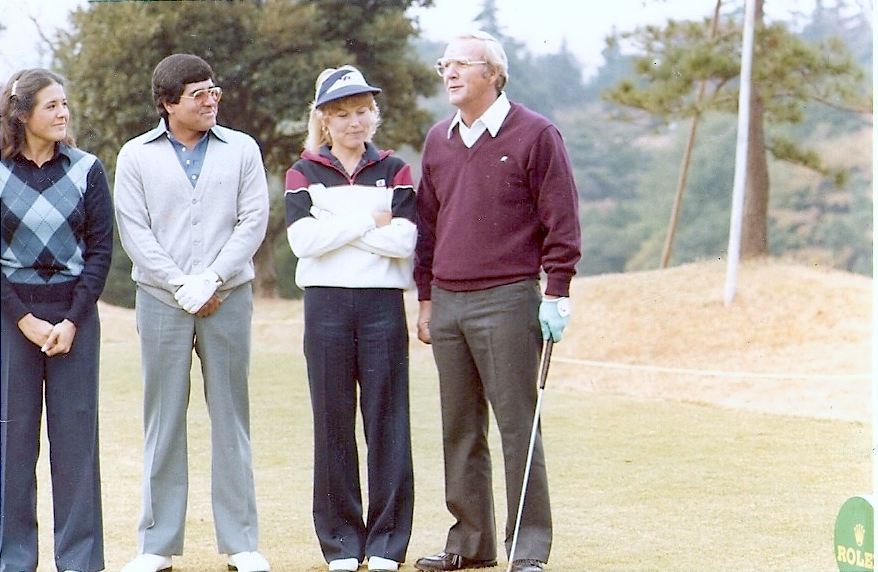
Ernesto Pérez Acosta and Nancy Lopez at the 1977 Rolex Mixed World Championship in Japan, hosted by Arnold Palmer.

== Early life ==
Pérez Acosta was born and raised in the Agua Caliente neighborhood of Tijuana, Mexico. He grew up in a family of a well-known and respected dynasty of pro golfers in Mexico, along brothers Fidel, David, Eduardo, Luis and Carlos. He had his beginnings in the golfing arena as a caddie at the Tijuana Country Club, where he came to be a long-time club and touring professional.

== Amateur career ==
As an amateur, Pérez Acosta represented Mexico at the 1968 Eisenhower Trophy, in Melbourne, Australia, and the Copa de la Hispanidad in Manila, Philippines, where his team won the international championship.

== Professional career ==
Pérez Acosta turned professional in 1970 and won two Mexican Open titles, being the first Mexican winner and still remains the only Mexican with multiple titles. In his native country, he collected over 75 titles over the span of four decades, making him one of Mexico's winningest professional golfers in the country's history.

He represented Mexico five times in the World Cup, winning the individual title in 1976 at Mission Hills Country Club in Rancho Mirage, California, United States, three strokes ahead of six players, including the 1976 U.S. Open champion Jerry Pate, PGA Championship winner Dave Stockton, and rising stars Greg Norman and Seve Ballesteros. The Mexico team of Pérez Acosta and Margarito Martinez finished tied 5th.

After his 1976 individual World Cup victory, Perez Acosta signed a management deal with famed sports agent Mark McCormack. This accomplishment earned him multiple invitations to international and official PGA Tour events, such as the 1977 World Match Play at Wentworth Club, England, The 1977 King Hassan World Open in Rabat, Morocco, the 1977 Memorial Tournament and the NEC World Series of Golf, at Firestone Country Club in Akron, Ohio, a 20-man event with the biggest first prize on the 1977 PGA Tour. The International at Castle Pines in 1986-1988 and many other official PGA Tour events such as the Bing Crosby Pebble Beach Pro-Am in 1976-1977 and 1972 Houston Texas Open.

Pérez Acosta has represented Mexico in 54 countries in different professional circuits such as the PGA, Champions, European, of which he is one of the founding members, Canadian, South American and Asian Tours.

After retiring from international competition, Pérez Acosta served as Director of Golf at several country clubs in Mexico. During his career he served at many prestigious golf clubs in Mexico besides his beloved Tijuana Country Club such as Club de Golf Santa Anita, Club de Golf Chiluca, Club de Golf La Hacienda, Club Campestre Juarez, San Carlos Country Club, Club de Golf Los Encinos, Club Campestre de Leon and Club de Golf Hacienda Juriquilla.

Pérez Acosta and his older brother David also served as Presidents of the Mexican Chapter of the PGA.

Pérez Acosta is now fully retired from competition. He spends his time playing, teaching and coaching golf to new generations at his home club, the Tijuana Country Club, formerly known as the Agua Caliente Golf Club.

== Awards and honors ==
- In 2008, Pérez Acosta was inducted into Tijuana's Sports Hall of Fame.
- in 2024, Pérez Acosta was inducted into Mexico's National Sports Hall of Fame (CODEME).

== Professional wins ==
This list is incomplete.

- 1970 Mexican Open
- 1971 Utah Open
- 1973 Tijuana Open
- 1974 Mexican PGA Championship, Guadalajara International Open
- 1975 Mexican Masters, Mexican Tournament of Champions, Guadalajara International Open
- 1976 Mexican Open, Mexican Masters, Mexican Tournament of Champions, Mexican PGA Championship, International Trophy (World Cup individual winner), Campestre de Coatzacoalcos Pro-Am (Mexico)
- 1978 Rolex World Mixed Championships (Tokyo, Japan) (with Nancy Lopez)
- 1981 Campestre de Coatzacoalcos Pro-Am (Mexico)
- 1982 New Mexico Open
- 2000 Mexican Senior Championship

== Team appearances ==
Amateur

- America's Cup: 1967
- Copa de la Hispanidad (representing Mexico): 1968 (winners)
- Eisenhower Trophy (representing Mexico): 1968

Professional

- World Cup (representing Mexico): 1975, 1976 (individual winner), 1978, 1980, 1987
- Alfred Dunhill Cup (representing Mexico): 1987
