= 1986 Canadian Tour =

Golf tour season

1986 Canadian Tour season
- Duration: June 16, 1986 – September 14, 1986
- Number of official events: 8
- Most wins: (Canada) Bob Panasik (2)
- Order of Merit: (Canada) Dave Barr

The 1986 Canadian Tour was the inaugural season of the Canadian Tour, the main professional golf tour in Canada since it was formed in 1986.

== Schedule ==
The following table lists official events during the 1986 season.

Date	Tournament	Location	Purse (C$)	Winner (Note: The number in parentheses after each winner's name is the number of Canadian Tour events they had won up to and including that tournament.)	OWGR points
Jun 18	Labbatt's Blue Light Pro-Am	Ontario	50,000	(Canada) Gordon Smith (1)	n/a
Jun 22	Quebec Open	Quebec	60,000	(Canada) Dave Barr (1)	n/a
Jul 6	Hamilton Blue Light Pro-Am	Ontario	25,000	(Canada) Frank Edmonds (1)	n/a
Jul 13	Windsor Charity Classic	Ontario	50,000	(United States) David Tentis (1)	n/a
Aug 24	Manitoba Open	Manitoba	50,000	(Canada) Bob Panasik (1)	n/a
Aug 31	George Williams B.C. Open	British Columbia	125,000	(United States) Jim Hallet (1)	n/a
Sep 7	Payless Canadian Tournament Players Championship	British Columbia	50,000	(Canada) Bob Panasik (2)	n/a
Sep 14	CPGA Championship	Ontario	100,000	(Canada) Dan Halldorson (1)	4

== Order of Merit ==
The Order of Merit was titled as the Labbatt Order of Merit and was based on prize money won during the season, calculated in Canadian dollars.

Position	Player	Prize money (C$)
1	(Canada) Dave Barr	54,525
2	(Canada) Dan Halldorson	36,118
3	(Canada) Bob Panasik	22,854
4	(Canada) Daniel Talbot	22,830
5	(Canada) Jean-Louis Lamarre	16,889
