= 1983 World Cup (men's golf) =

Tournament information
- Dates: 8–11 December
- Location: Jakarta, Indonesia; 6°15′56.55″S 106°47′3.47″E
- Course: Pondok Indah Golf & Country Club
- Format: 72 holes stroke play combined score

Statistics
- Par: 72
- Length: 7,000 yards (6,400 m)
- Field: 32 two-man teams
- Cut: None

Champion
- United States; Rex Caldwell & John Cook
- 565 (−11)

Location map
- Location in Indonesia Location in Java Location in Jakarta

The 1983 World Cup took place 8–11 December 1983 at the Pondok Indah Golf and Country Club in Pondok Indah, Pondok Pinang, Kebayoran Lama, South Jakarta, Indonesia. It was the 30th World Cup event. The tournament was a 72-hole stroke play team event with 32 teams (of which Germany withdrew from the competition). Each team consisted of two players from a country. The combined score of each team determined the team results. The United States team of Rex Caldwell and John Cook won by seven strokes over the Australia team of Terry Gale and Wayne Grady and Canada team of Dave Barr and Jerry Anderson The individual competition for The International Trophy, was won by Dave Barr three strokes ahead of Rex Caldwell.

== Teams ==
Country	Players
Argentina	Eduardo Romero and Adan Sowa
Australia	Terry Gale and Wayne Grady
Austria	Franz Laimer and Oswald Gartenmaier
Brazil	Priscillo Diniz and Frederico German
Canada	Dave Barr and Jerry Anderson
Chile	Francesco Cerda and Alejandro Urzua
Colombia	Luis Arevalo and Juan Pinzon
Denmark	Herluf Hansen and Per Greve
England	Brian Waites and Gordon J. Brand
France	Géry Watine and Benoît Ducoulombier
Hong Kong	Lee Parker and Yau Siu Ming
India	Rohtas Singh and Brandon de Souza
Indonesia	Sumarno and Suparman
Ireland	Eamonn Darcy and Ronan Rafferty
Italy	Silvano Locatelli and Massimo Mannelli
Japan	Kikuo Arai and Saburo Fujiki
Malaysia	Marimuthu Ramayah and Sahabuddin Yusof
Mexico	Victor Regalado and Enrique Serna
Netherlands	Jan Dorrestein and Wilfred Lemmens
New Zealand	Dennis Clark and Stuart Reese
Paraguay	Eladio Franco and Ángel Jiménez
Philippines	Frankie Miñoza and Rudy Lavares
Scotland	Ken Brown and Bernard Gallacher
Singapore	Lim Swee Chew and M Marimutho
South Korea	Yoon Soo Choi and Myung Ha Lee
Spain	Manuel Piñero and José María Cañizares
Sweden	Magnus Persson and Ove Sellberg
Thailand	Sukree Onsham and Suthep Meesawat
United States	Rex Caldwell and John Cook
Venezuela	Freddy Acevedo and Ramón Muñoz
Wales	David Vaughan and Ian Woosnam
West Germany	Karl-Heinz Gögele and Torsten Giedeon

== Scores ==
Team

Place	Country	Score	To par	Money (US$)
1	United States	140-140-145-140=565	−11	10,000
T2	Australia	146-145-135-146=572	−4	4,500
T2	Canada	138-148-138-148=572	−4	4,500
4	Ireland	147-142-144-141=574	−2	2,000
T5	Japan	151-143-143-142=579	+3	
T5	Spain	143-148-142-146=579	+3	
7	Argentina	145-148-143-147=583	+7	
8	Colombia	155-144-147-138=584	+8	
9	England	151-150-142-143=586	+10	
10	Brazil	145-148-149-145=587	+11	
T11	Sweden	150-150-151-140=591	+15	
T11	Wales	144-150-142-155=591	+15	
13	France	150-149-148-145=592	+16	
14	Scotland	146-149-150-148=593	+17	
T15	Mexico	145-149-150-151=595	+19	
T15	South Korea	146-149-146-154=595	+19	
17	Singapore	149-146-154-147=596	+20	
18	Philippines	146-154-150-148=598	+22	
19	Thailand	151-147-148-154=600	+24	
T20	Indonesia	155-150-151-147=603	+27	
T20	Venezuela	159-148-151-145=603	+27	
22	Italy	142-158-148-157=605	+29	
T23	Malaysia	154-155-147-150=606	+30	
T23	New Zealand	156-152-147-151=606	+30	
25	Chile	152-151-150-157=610	+34	
T26	Hong Kong	150-155-157-152=614	+38	
T26	India	152-157-155-149=614	+38	
28	Netherlands	157-161-149-150=617	+41	
29	Paraguay	163-154-159-149=625	+49	
30	Denmark	160-157-155-158=630	+54	
31	Austria	159-154-161-157=631	+55	
WD	West Germany			

International Trophy

Place	Player	Country	Score	To par
1	Dave Barr	Canada	66-67-69-74=276	−12
2	Rex Caldwell	United States	69-72-72-66=279	−9
T3	Peter Fowler	Australia	69-73-71-67=284	−4
T3	Victor Regalado	Mexico	71-69-71-73=284	−4
T3	Ian Woosnam	Wales	70-74-69-71=284	−4
T6	Eamonn Darcy	Ireland	74-71-70-70=285	−3
T6	Priscillo Diniz	Brazil	69-73-71-72=285	−3
T8	John Cook	United States	71-68-73-74=286	−2
T8	Terry Gale	Australia	76-72-68-70=286	−2
T8	Wayne Grady	Australia	70-73-67-76=286	−2
T8	Manuel Piñero	Spain	70-75-69-72=286	−2

Peter Fowler was invited to play in the individual competition for The International Trophy, out of the team competition.
