= 1979 World Cup (men's golf) =

Tournament information
- Dates: 8–11 November
- Location: Athens, Greece; 37°52′N 23°45′E
- Course: Glyfada Golf Club
- Format: 72 holes stroke play combined score

Statistics
- Par: 72
- Length: 6,809 yards (6,226 m)
- Field: 45 two-man teams
- Cut: None
- Winner's share: $6,000 team $3,000 individual

Champion
- United States; Hale Irwin & John Mahaffey
- 575 (−1)

Location map
- Location in Europe Location in Balkans Location in Greece

The 1979 World Cup took place 8–11 November at the Glyfada Golf Club, 13 kilometres south of the city center of Athens, Greece, located in the Athens Riviera. It was the 27th World Cup event. The tournament was a 72-hole stroke play team event with 46 notified teams. Each team consisted of two players from a country. The South Africa team was invited to the event and their team of Hugh Baiocchi and Dale Hayes took part in practice and pro-am competition, but was informed by the Greece government shortly before the beginning of competition, they were not allowed to start. The combined score of each team determined the team results. The United States team of John Mahaffey and Hale Irwin won by ten strokes over the Scotland team of Ken Brown and Sandy Lyle.

The individual competition for the International Trophy was won by Irwin two strokes ahead of Bernhard Langer, West Germany and Lyle, Scotland.

== Teams ==
Country	Players
Argentina	Jorge Soto and Adan Sowa
Australia	Colin Bishop and Ross Metherell
Austria	Oswald Gartenmaier and Rudolfo Hauser
Belgium	Philippe Toussaint and Flory Van Donck
Brazil	Jaime Gonzalez and Rafael Navarro
Burma	Maun Pyone and Ko Ko Lay
Canada	Dan Halldorson and Jim Nelford
Chile	Francisco Cerda and Patricio Valenzuela
Colombia	Luis Arevalo and Juan Pinzon
Denmark	Herluf Hansen and Jorgen Korfitsen
Dominican Republic	Jack Corrie and Guillermo Gomez
Egypt	Farouk Badr and Mohamed Said Moussa
England	Mark James and Michael King
Fiji	Aran Kumar and Bose Lutunatabua
France	Jean Garaïalde and Bernard Pascassio
Greece	Bassili Anastassiou (a) and Bassili Karatzas (a)
Guatemala	Roberto Galindo and Hilario Polo
Hong Kong	Lai Wai Che and Peter Tang
Indonesia	Engrun Tiahyana and Murat Satibi
Ireland	Eddie Polland and Des Smyth
Israel	Laurie Been (a) and Neil Schochet (a)
Italy	Baldovino Dassù and Delio Lovato
Japan	Kazuo Yoshikawa and Kaichi Inoue
Lebanon	Ziki Mukdad and Robert Prince
Malaysia	Marimuthu Ramayah and Nazamuddin Yusof
Mexico	Enrique Serna and Victor Regalado
Netherlands	Jan Dorrestein and Simon Van Den Berg
New Zealand	Craig Owen and Barry Vivian
Norway	Ole Hammer (a) and Johan Horn (a)
Philippines	Eleuterio Nival and Rudy Lavares
Portugal	Sebastiao Gil and Domingo Silva
Scotland	Ken Brown and Sandy Lyle
Singapore	Lim Swee Wah and Poh Eng Chong
South Korea	Cho Tae-ho and Choi Yoon-soo
Spain	Antonio Garrido and Manuel Piñero
Sweden	Sayed Cherif and Jan Sonnevi
Switzerland	Patrick Bagnoud and Mauric Salmini
Taiwan	Chen Tze-ming and Lu Hsi-chuen
Thailand	Sukree Onsham and Archin Sopon
United States	Hale Irwin and John Mahaffey
Venezuela	Noel Machado and Ramón Muñoz
Wales	Brian Huggett and David Vaughan
West Germany	Manfred Kessler and Bernhard Langer
Yugoslavia	Rafael Jerman (a) and Marko Vovk (a)

(a) denotes amateur

Note: Sayed Cherif was representing Sweden, having played for Egypt in previous World Cup events.

== Scores ==
Team

Place	Country	Score	To par	Money (US$)
1	United States	141-141-152-141=575	−1	6,000
2	Scotland	145-145-150-140=580	+4	3,000
3	Spain	147-153-144-146=590	+14	
4	Brazil	148-144-153-148=593	+17	
5	Taiwan	144-149-146-155=594	+18	
6	Ireland	150-153-148-146=597	+21	
T7	Canada	150-148-155-146=599	+23	
T7	Japan	147-150-151-151=599	+23	
T9	England	153-145-147-155=600	+24	
T9	France	151-150-150-149=600	+24	
T11	Malaysia	149-154-149-150=602	+26	
T11	West Germany	160-145-150-147=602	+26	
13	Mexico	150-150-152-153=605	+29	
14	Colombia	151-153-152-152=608	+32	
15	New Zealand	156-155-150-149=610	+34	
16	Venezuela	151-155-150-157=613	+37	
17	Belgium	154-154-154-153=615	+39	
18	South Korea	152-154-151-161=618	+42	
T19	Philippines	147-154-157-161=619	+43	
T19	Wales	150-157-155-157=619	+43	
21	Argentina	160-158-148-155=621	+45	
22	Chile	155-159-160-148=622	+46	
23	Greece	159-160-154-153=626	+50	
24	Thailand	165-158-154-151=628	+52	
T25	Australia	160-166-153-155=634	+58	
T25	Sweden	158-162-154-160=634	+58	
27	Denmark	161-163-155-157=636	+60	
28	Austria	166-155-155-161=637	+61	
29	Netherlands	161-161-154-162=638	+62	
30	Egypt	162-157-159-161=639	+63	
T31	Guatemala	162-162-154-162=640	+64	
T31	Switzerland	162-158-161-159=640	+64	
T33	Hong Kong	158-156-162-167=643	+67	
T33	Singapore	162-168-162-151=643	+67	
T35	Dominican Republic	160-156-166-164=646	+70	
T35	Portugal	159-164-156-167=646	+70	
37	Indonesia	169-164-158-163=654	+78	
38	Lebanon	172-157-158-168=655	+79	
39	Norway	169-165-158-170=662	+86	
40	Fiji	166-178-159-163=666	+90	
41	Burma	167-168-170-163=668	+92	
42	Israel	165-172-169-177=683	+107	
43	Paraguay	170-174-183-175=702	+126	
44	Yugoslavia	188-186-177-184=735	+159	
DQ	Italy	158-143-148-DQ		

Dassù of Italy was disqualified after signing an incorrect scorecard.

International Trophy

Place	Player	Country	Score	To par	Money US$
1	Hale Irwin	United States	74-70-72-69=285	−3	3,000
T2	Bernhard Langer	West Germany	74-70-71-71=287	−1	
T2	Sandy Lyle	Scotland	72-73-73-69=287	−1	
4	Jaime Gonzalez	Brazil	73-71-72-72=288	E	
5	Antonio Garrido	Spain	74-76-66-73=289	+1	
6	John Mahaffey	United States	67-71-80-72=290	+2	
7	Ramón Muñoz	Venezuela	72-78-70-72=292	+4	
T8	Ken Brown	Scotland	73-72-77-71=293	+5	
T8	Lu Hsi-chuen	Taiwan	71-73-72-77=293	+5	
T8	Kazuo Yoshikawa	Japan	71-74-73-75=293	+5	
