= David Vaughan (golfer) =

Welsh golfer (born 1948)

Personal information
- Full name: David I. Vaughan
- Nationality: Wales
- Born: 26 June 1948 (age 78) St Helens, England
- Height: 5 ft 7 in (1.70 m)
- Weight: 151 lb (68 kg; 10.8 st)

Career
- Sport: Golf
- Turned professional: 1965
- Former tours: European Tour; European Seniors Tour
- Professional wins: 2

Best results in major championships
- Masters Tournament: DNP
- PGA Championship: DNP
- U.S. Open: DNP
- The Open Championship: T7: 1972

David I. Vaughan (born 26 June 1948) is a Welsh professional golfer.

== Professional career ==
Vaughan played on the European Tour where his best finishes were a pair of third places: 1972 Benson & Hedges Festival of Golf and 1977 Martini International. He represented Wales seven times in the World Cup. He was the professional at Vale of Llangollen Golf Club where he stayed until his retirement in 2013 after 32 years service.

Vaughan also played on the European Seniors Tour.

== Professional wins (2) ==
- 1971 Lord Derby’s Under-23 Professional Tournament
- 1980 Midland Professional Championship

== Results in major championships ==
Tournament	1971	1972	1973	1974	1975	1976	1977	1978	1979	1980	1981	1982	1983
The Open Championship	CUT	T7	T37		T53		T41	CUT		CUT			CUT

Note: Vaughan only played in The Open Championship.

Top 10
Did not play

CUT = missed the half-way cut
"T" indicates a tie for a place

== Team appearances ==
- World Cup (representing Wales): 1972, 1973, 1977, 1978, 1979, 1980, 1983
- Double Diamond International (representing Wales): 1971, 1972, 1973, 1974, 1975, 1976, 1977
- Marlboro Nations' Cup (representing Wales): 1972, 1973
