= Jim Nelford =

Canadian professional golfer (born 1955)

Personal information
- Full name: James Cameron Nelford
- Nationality: Canada
- Born: June 28, 1955 (age 71) Vancouver, British Columbia, Canada

Career
- Sport: Golf
- College: Brigham Young University
- Turned professional: 1977
- Former tour: PGA Tour
- Professional wins: 4

Best results in major championships
- Masters Tournament: DNP
- PGA Championship: T55: 1983
- U.S. Open: T41: 1979
- The Open Championship: DNP

Achievements and awards
- Canadian Golf Hall of Fame: 2013

James Cameron Nelford (born June 28, 1955) is a Canadian professional golfer, who has played on the PGA Tour. He has also been a golf commentator for ESPN.

== Early life and amateur career ==
Nelford was born in Vancouver, British Columbia. He won the 1973 B.C. High School golf Championship and the 1973 B.C. Junior Championship.

He attended Brigham Young University, where he played on the varsity golf team on scholarship. Nelford won two All-American selections: 1976 and 1977, both Second Team. In addition, Nelford won the 1975 and 1976 Canadian Amateur Championship and the 1977 Western Amateur.

== Professional career ==
In 1977, Nelford turned professional. He played on the PGA Tour from 1978 to 1988, where his best finish was second at the 1983 Sea Pines Heritage Classic and at the 1984 Bing Crosby Pro-Am (playoff loss to Hale Irwin). He won the World Cup with Dan Halldorson in 1980 and won one Tournament Players' Series event (a PGA Tour satellite event).

Nelford was seriously injured in a waterskiing accident in September 1985, suffering crippling damage to his right arm when it was badly sliced by the propeller blade. Although he recovered, he was never able to regain his top golf form after that, and gradually lost his playing status on the PGA Tour.

Along with Lorne Rubenstein, Nelford co-authored the 1984 book Seasons in a Golfer's Life, a story of his life in golf. Nelford putts left-handed, but plays all of his other shots right-handed. Since turning age 50, Nelford has appeared in a few Champions Tour events, without achieving notable success.

== Awards and honors ==
In 2013, Nelford was inducted into the Canadian Golf Hall of Fame.

== Amateur wins ==
- 1975 Canadian Amateur Championship
- 1976 Canadian Amateur Championship
- 1977 Western Amateur

== Professional wins (4) ==
- 1978 Cacharel World Under-25 Championship
- 1980 World Cup (team with Dan Halldorson)
- 1983 Essex International Classic (Canada), British Columbia Open

== Playoff record ==
PGA Tour playoff record (0–1)

No.	Year	Tournament	Opponent	Result
1	1984	Bing Crosby National Pro-Am	(United States) Hale Irwin	Lost to birdie on second extra hole

== Team appearances ==
Amateur

- Commonwealth Tournament (representing Canada): 1975 (winners)
- Eisenhower Trophy (representing Canada): 1976

Professional

- World Cup (representing Canada): 1979, 1980 (winners)

== Bibliography ==
- Seasons in a Golfer's Life, with Lorne Rubenstein

== See also ==
- Fall 1977 PGA Tour Qualifying School graduates
- 1987 PGA Tour Qualifying School graduates
