= General Brock Open =

Golf tournament

The General Brock Open was a golf tournament played at Lookout Point Country Club, Fonthill, Ontario, Canada, west of Niagara Falls. It was played from 1935 to 1937. The event was sponsored by the General Brock Hotel.

The 1935 event was played from July 11 to 13. Tony Manero won by a strokes from Canadian amateur Bud Donovan and Byron Nelson. Manero had a final round 71 to pass Nelson who finished with a 77. The 1936 event was played from June 11 to 13. Craig Wood won by two strokes after a final round of 68. The 1937 event was played from July 8 to 10. The tournament was won by Jules Huot who finished two ahead of Bill Mehlhorn. Huot took a three stroke lead after 54 holes after a third round 66.

== Winners ==
Year	Player	Country	Score	To par	Margin of victory	Runner(s)-up	Winner's share ($)	Ref
General Brock Open
1937	Jules Huot	Canada	280	E	2 strokes	(United States) Bill Mehlhorn	750	
1936	Craig Wood	United States	285	+5	2 strokes	(United States) Tony Manero	1,000	
General Brock Hotel Open
1935	Tony Manero	United States	291	+11	1 stroke	(Canada) Bud Donovan (a) (United States) Byron Nelson	750	
