= Lorne Rubenstein =

Canadian golf journalist and author (born 1948)

Lorne Rubenstein (born 25 June 1948 in Toronto, Ontario, Canada) is a Canadian golf journalist and author. He was the golf columnist for the Globe and Mail in Canada from 1980 to 2013. Rubenstein has written 16 books about golf.

He maintained a near-scratch handicap for many years and played in the Ontario Amateur and British Amateur. He caddied on the PGA Tour a few tournaments a season for several years, first for 1967 U.S. and British Amateur champion Bob Dickson, and then for 1975 and 1976 Canadian Amateur winner Jim Nelford. He is a course-ranking panelist for SCOREGolf Magazine.

Rubenstein co-hosted Acura World of Golf on The Sports Network in Canada for the 11 years that it ran. He has written for publications around the world, including Golf Digest, Golf World, Golf Magazine, Esquire, Travel & Leisure Golf, Masters Journal, Golf Monthly (U.K.)., Links, Toronto Life, and others.

Rubenstein has co-written books with Jim Nelford, George Knudson, David Leadbetter, Nick Price, and Tiger Woods. Tiger Woods told Golf Digest, "Only two golfers have ever truly owned their swings: Moe Norman and Ben Hogan." The book is called Moe & Me: Encounters with Moe Norman, Golf's Mysterious Genius. ECW Press published Moe & Me in the spring of 2012.

A complete list of Rubenstein's books:

Brantford (Ontario) Golf and Country Club, 1879-1979 published privately by the club in 1979. Seasons in a Golfer's Life, with Jim Nelford; Methuen, Toronto, 1984 Summit (Ontario) Golf and Country Club, 1912-1987, published privately by club, 1987 The Natural Golf Swing, by George Knudson with Lorne Rubenstein, McClelland & Stewart, Toronto, 1988 Links: An Insider's Tour Through the World of Golf, Random House of Canada, Toronto, 1990; Stanley Paul, U.K. 1991; published as Links: An Exploration into the Mind, Heart and Soul of Golf, Prima, Rocklin, Calif., 1991. Touring Prose: Writings on Golf, Random House of Canada, Toronto, 1993. The Swing: Mastering the Principles of the Game, by Nick Price with Lorne Rubenstein, Alfred A. Knopf, New York, 1997; Random House of Canada, Toronto, 1997; The Fundamentals of Hogan, by David Leadbetter with Lorne Rubenstein, Sleeping Bear Press/Doubleday (U.S.), 2000; McClelland & Stewart (Canada), 2000; Harper Collins (U.K.), 2000. A Season in Dornoch: Golf and Life in the Scottish Highlands, McClelland and Stewart (Canada), 2001; Simon and Schuster (U.S.), 2001; Mainstream, U.K., spring 2003 Mike Weir: The Road to the Masters, McClelland & Stewart, fall 2003 A Disorderly Compendium of Golf, with Jeff Neuman, McClelland & Stewart (Canada), Workman Publishing (U.S.), 2006. This Round's on Me: Lorne Rubenstein on Golf, McClelland & Stewart, April 2009 Moe and Me: Encounters with Moe Norman, Golf's Mysterious Genius, ECW Press, April 2012. The Royal Montreal Golf Club: The Presidents Cup, published privately by club, 2008. The Thornhill Club: 100 Years, published privately by the club in 2022.

== Recognition ==
Rubenstein won a National Magazine Award (1985) in Canada. The Golf Writers Association of America has presented him with four first-place awards for his writing. He is the recipient of awards from the Golf Journalists Association of Canada for his articles. Rubenstein was inducted into the Ontario Golf Hall of Fame in 2006 and the Canadian Golf Hall of Fame in 2007. He received a Canadian Sports Media Lifetime Achievement Award in 2009. The Golf Association of Ontario presented the first Lorne Rubenstein Media Award in May 2012. The PGA of America presented Rubenstein with its Lifetime Achievement Award in Journalism in 2018.
