= Jules Huot =

Canadian golfer

Personal information
- Full name: Jules Huot
- Nickname: Petit Jules
- Nationality: Canada
- Born: January 7, 1908 Boischatel, Quebec, Canada
- Died: February 2, 1999 (aged 91) Vimont, Quebec, Canada

Career
- Sport: Golf
- Status: Professional
- Professional wins: 17

Number of wins by tour
- PGA Tour: 1
- Other: 16

Best results in major championships
- Masters Tournament: T33: 1940
- PGA Championship: DNP
- U.S. Open: DNP
- The Open Championship: DNP

Achievements and awards
- Canada's Sports Hall of Fame: 1978
- Canadian Golf Hall of Fame: 1977

Jules Huot (January 7, 1908 – February 2, 1999) was a French-Canadian professional golfer.

Huot was born in Boischatel, Quebec and was the most successful member of a large golfing family, with brothers Rodolphe and Roland also enjoying provincial and national success. He served as the head professional at several golf clubs in Quebec, most notably at Kent Golf Club for almost 15 years and then at Le Club Laval-suc-le-lac, where he remained for 25 years until his retirement in 1970.

Huot had a successful tournament career, highlighted by winning the General Brock Open on the PGA Tour – the first Canadian professional to win on the tour, and Canadian PGA Championship on three occasions, in 1934, 1939 and 1946. Amongst others, he also won the open championships of Ontario and Quebec. He played in the Masters Tournament on three occasions, in 1935, 1936 and 1940, with a best finish of tied-33rd in his final appearance. He also represented Canada internationally, including at the 1954 Canada Cup and in the Hopkins Trophy every year from 1952 to 1955.

Huot has been widely recognised for his achievement and contributions to golf, highlighted by his induction into the Canadian Golf Hall of Fame in 1977, and the Canada's Sports Hall of Fame in 1978. He has also been inducted into the halls of fame of the PGA of Canada and Quebec Golf, and had streets named after him in Montréal and Chicoutimi.

== Professional wins ==
=== PGA Tour (1) ===
No.	Date	Tournament	Winning score	Margin of victory	Runner-up
1	Jul 10, 1937	General Brock Open	E (72-70-66-72=280)	2 strokes	(United States) Bill Mehlhorn

=== Other wins ===
- 1932 Quebec Spring Open
- 1934 Canadian PGA Championship, Quebec Open
- 1935 Quebec Spring Open
- 1939 Canadian PGA Championship
- 1945 Quebec Open
- 1946 Canadian PGA Championship, Quebec PGA Championship
- 1947 Quebec PGA Championship
- 1951 Quebec Spring Open
- 1952 Quebec Spring Open
- 1955 Ontario Open, Quebec PGA Championship
- 1958 Quebec Open, Quebec PGA Championship
- 1959 Quebec PGA Championship

== Results in major championships ==
Tournament	1935	1936	1937	1938	1939	1940
Masters Tournament	59	T39				T33

Note: Huot only played in the Masters Tournament.

Did not play

"T" indicates a tie for a place

== Team appearances ==
- Canada Cup (representing Canada): 1954
- Hopkins Trophy: 1952, 1953, 1954, 1955
