= Dan Halldorson =

Canadian professional golfer

Personal information
- Full name: Daniel Albert Halldorson
- Nationality: Canada
- Born: April 2, 1952 Winnipeg, Manitoba, Canada
- Died: November 18, 2015 (aged 63) Cambridge, Illinois, U.S.
- Height: 5 ft 10 in (1.78 m)
- Weight: 195 lb (88 kg; 13.9 st)

Career
- Sport: Golf
- Turned professional: 1971
- Former tours: PGA Tour; Canadian Tour; Champions Tour
- Professional wins: 13

Number of wins by tour
- PGA Tour: 1
- Other: 12

Best results in major championships
- Masters Tournament: CUT: 1981
- PGA Championship: T16: 1982
- U.S. Open: T40: 1988
- The Open Championship: DNP

Daniel Albert Halldorson (April 2, 1952 – November 18, 2015) was a Canadian professional golfer who played on the PGA Tour and the Canadian Tour. He won once on the PGA Tour and was twice part of winning Canadian World Cup teams.

== Early life ==
Halldorson was born in Winnipeg, Manitoba, and raised in Brandon, Manitoba.

== Professional career ==
In 1971, Halldorson turned pro. He joined the Canadian Tour in 1973 and the PGA Tour in 1975.

Halldorson had seven career wins on the Canadian Tour and its predecessors. He won one official PGA Tour event, the 1980 Pensacola Open, and finished a career best 36th on the PGA Tour money list that year. He won the unofficial Deposit Guaranty Golf Classic in 1986. Halldorson was a member of seven WGC-World Cup Canadian national teams (1976, 1978, 1979, 1980, 1982, 1985, 1991) including two winning teams (1980, 1985).

Halldorson played briefly on the Champions Tour after turning 50 in 2002. He operated a golf course design business with fellow former PGA Tour golfer Mike Morley. Halldorson also authored a golf instructional book and was the deputy director of the Canadian Tour.

== Personal life ==
Halldorson lived in Cambridge, Illinois. He died from a massive stroke at the age of 63.

== Awards and honors ==
- In 2002, Halldorson was elected to the Canadian Golf Hall of Fame.
- In 2005, Halldorson was named a Lifetime Member of the Canadian Tour.
- In 2007, Halldorson was elected to the Manitoba Sports Hall of Fame.

== Professional wins (13) ==
=== PGA Tour wins (1) ===
No.	Date	Tournament	Winning score	Margin of victory	Runners-up
1	Oct 12, 1980	Pensacola Open	−13 (68-67-70-70=275)	2 strokes	(United States) Gary Hallberg, (United States) Mike Sullivan

PGA Tour playoff record (0–1)

No.	Year	Tournament	Opponents	Result
1	1981	Quad Cities Open	(Canada) Dave Barr, (United States) Woody Blackburn, (United States) Frank Conner, (Mexico) Victor Regalado	Barr won with par on eighth extra hole Conner, Halldorson and Regalado eliminated by birdie on first hole

=== Canadian Tour wins (1) ===
No.	Date	Tournament	Winning score	Margin of victory	Runner-up
1	Sep 14, 1986	CPGA Championship	−11 (68-71-70-68=277)	1 stroke	(Canada) Dave Barr

=== Earlier Canadian wins (6) ===
No.	Date	Tournament	Winning score	Margin of victory	Runner(s)-up
1	Jul 31, 1977	Manitoba Open	+1 (71-68-69=208)	1 stroke	(United States) Ray Thompson
2	Aug 7, 1977	Saskatchewan Open	−9 (69-66-72=207)	Playoff	(Canada) Cec Ferguson, (Canada) Gar Hamilton
3	Jul 30, 1978	Manitoba Open (2)	−3 (70-69-74=213)	2 strokes	(Canada) Terry More (a)
4	Jun 29, 1980	Quebec Open	−11 (70-68-67=205)	6 strokes	(Canada) Serge Thivierge
5	Aug 14, 1983	Manitoba Open (3)	+1 (70-68-70=208)	4 strokes	(Canada) Scott Knapp
6	Aug 12, 1984	Manitoba Open (4)	−8 (68-70-70=208)	Playoff	(Canada) Sandy Harper

=== Other wins (5) ===
No.	Date	Tournament	Winning score	Margin of victory	Runner(s)-up
1	Jul 15, 1977	Shrine Pro-Am	−7 (70-67=137)	Shared title with (Canada) Gar Hamilton and (Canada) George Knudson	
2	Dec 14, 1980	World Cup (with (Canada) Jim Nelford)	−14 (144-143-139-146=572)	3 strokes	Scotland − Sandy Lyle and Steve Martin
3	Jul 25, 1982	Colorado Open	−1 (68-72-69-70=279)	2 strokes	(United States) Bob Byman, (United States) Ron Vlosich
4	Nov 24, 1985	World Cup (2) (with (Canada) Dave Barr)	−17 (138-135-140-146=559)	4 strokes	England − Howard Clark and Paul Way
5	Apr 13, 1986	Deposit Guaranty Golf Classic	−17 (64-67-66-66=263)	2 strokes	(United States) Paul Azinger

== Results in major championships ==
Tournament	1980	1981	1982	1983	1984	1985	1986	1987	1988	1989	1990	1991	1992
Masters Tournament		CUT											
U.S. Open					CUT	CUT			T40	T63		CUT	CUT
PGA Championship	CUT	WD	T16	CUT		CUT	CUT						

Note: Halldorson never played in The Open Championship.

Did not play

CUT = missed the half-way cut
WD = withdrew
"T" = tied

== Results in The Players Championship ==
Tournament	1979	1980	1981	1982	1983	1984	1985	1986	1987	1988	1989	1990	1991	1992	1993
The Players Championship	T69	T22	T8	T70	CUT	CUT	T5	CUT	CUT	T27	T59		CUT	T64	CUT

Top 10
Did not play

CUT = missed the halfway cut
"T" indicates a tie for a place

== Team appearances ==
- World Cup (representing Canada): 1976, 1978, 1979, 1980 (winners), 1982, 1985 (winners), 1991
- Dunhill Cup (representing Canada): 1985, 1986, 1987, 1988, 1989, 1991

== See also ==
- 1974 PGA Tour Qualifying School graduates
- Fall 1978 PGA Tour Qualifying School graduates
- 1990 PGA Tour Qualifying School graduates
