= 1976 World Cup (men's golf) =

Tournament information
- Dates: December 9–12
- Location: Rancho Mirage, California, U.S. 33.798°N 116.433°W
- Course: Mission Hills Country Club
- Format: 72 holes stroke play combined score

Statistics
- Par: 72
- Length: 7,381 yards (6,749 m)
- Field: 48 two-man teams
- Cut: None
- Prize fund: US$6,300 $4,200 team $2,100 individual
- Winner's share: $2,000 team $1,000 individual

Champion
- Spain; Seve Ballesteros & Manuel Piñero
- 574 (−2)

Location map
- Location in the United States Location in California

The 1976 World Cup took place December 9–12 at the Mission Hills Country Club in Rancho Mirage, California, United States. It was the 24th World Cup event. The tournament was a 72-hole stroke play team event with 48 teams. Each team consisted of two players from a country. The combined score of each team determined the team results. The Spanish team of Seve Ballesteros and Manuel Piñero won by two strokes over the United States team of Jerry Pate and Dave Stockton. The individual competition for The International Trophy, was won by Ernesto Perez Acosta of Mexico, three strokes ahead of six players, who tied second.

== Teams ==
Country	Players
Argentina	Juan Gumersindo Quinteros and Juan Carlos Cabrera
Australia	Bob Shearer and Greg Norman
Austria	Oswald Gartenmaier and Rudolph Hauser
Belgium	Sylvain Bouillon and Philippe Toussaint
Brazil	Luis Pinto and Antonio Evangelista
Burma	Mya Aye and Maung Shein
Canada	George Knudson and Dan Halldorson
Chile	Patricio Valenzuela and Francisco Cerda
Colombia	Alfonso Bohorquez and Juan Pinzon
Costa Rica	Francisco Jiminez and Manfred Haehndr (a)
Denmark	Per Greve and Herluf Hansen
Dominican Republic	Edwin Corrie (a) and Guillermo Gomez
Egypt	Mohamed Abdel Halim and Mohamed Said Moussa
England	Martin Foster and Tommy Horton
France	Jean Garaïalde and Bernard Pascassio
Greece	George Vafiadis (a) and John Sotiropoulos
Guatemala	Roberto Galindo and Hilario Polo
Hong Kong	Lai Wai Che and Joe Hardwick
Ireland	Eamonn Darcy and Eddie Polland
Israel	Laurie Been (a) and Barry Mandel (a)
Italy	Baldovino Dassù and Luciana Grappasonni
Japan	Takashi Murakami and Yoshitaka Yamamoto
Malaysia	V. Nellan and Zainal Abidin Yusof
Mexico	Ernesto Perez Acosta and Margarito Martinez
Morocco	Mohammed Gartite and Fatmi Moussa
Netherlands	Jan Dorrestein and Bertus van Mook
New Zealand	Simon Owen and Barry Vivian
Nigeria	Paul Osaebi and Patrick Okpomu
Panama	Inocencio Galindo (a) and Jorge Paz-Rodriguez (a)
Paraguay	Luis Boschias and Genaro Espinola
Philippines	Paterno Braze Dimaano and Eleuterio Nival
Portugal	Domingos Silva and Henrique Paulino
Puerto Rico	Chi-Chi Rodríguez and Jesús Rodríguez
Scotland	Brian Barnes and Sam Torrance
Singapore	Lim Swee Chew and Lim Kian Teong
South Africa	Bobby Cole and Dale Hayes
South Korea	Han Chang-sang and Park Jung–ung
Spain	Seve Ballesteros and Manuel Piñero
Sweden	Åke Bergqvist and Thure Holmström
Switzerland	Jacob Kressig and Franco Salmina
Taiwan	Kuo Chie-Hsiung and Hsu Sheng-san
Thailand	Sukree Onsham and Pradhana Nganprom
Trinidad and Tobago	Robert McKenna and George Phillips
United States	Jerry Pate and Dave Stockton
Uruguay	Jose Esmoris and Juan Rodriguez
Venezuela	Julian Santana and Ramón Muñoz
Wales	Craig Defoy and Brian Huggett
West Germany	Bernhard Langer and Jurgen Harder

(a) denotes amateur

== Scores ==
Team

Place	Country	Score	To par	Money (US$)
1	Spain	146-142-144-142=574	−2	2,000
2	United States	144-147-140-145=576	E	1,000
3	Taiwan	144-151-138-148=581	+5	800
4	Scotland	143-148-151-141=583	+7	400
T5	Japan	147-144-152-141=584	+8	
T5	Mexico	148-147-143-146=584	+8	
T7	Australia	145-148-145-149=587	+11	
T7	South Africa	149-148-147-143=587	+11	
9	England	148-147-145-148=588	+12	
10	New Zealand	145-152-145-148=590	+14	
11	Ireland	151-151-146-146=594	+18	
T12	Colombia	151-153-147-151=602	+26	
T12	Puerto Rico	151-153-149-149=602	+26	
T14	France	149-151-153-152=605	+29	
T14	South Korea	149-157-145-154=605	+29	
T14	Wales	146-153-153-153=605	+29	
17	Philippines	150-154-149-156=609	+33	
18	Venezuela	154-153-149-154=610	+34	
19	Italy	150-156-155-150=611	+35	
20	Canada	150-158-154-150=612	+36	
21	Brazil	154-152-149-158=613	+37	
22	Belgium	159-150-157-151=617	+41	
23	Egypt	153-162-153-150=618	+42	
T24	Argentina	157-159-152-152=620	+44	
T24	Thailand	153-162-153-152=620	+44	
26	Denmark	158-157-157-150=622	+46	
T27	Chile	155-159-155-156=625	+49	
T27	Hong Kong	153-163-157-152=625	+49	
29	Morocco	151-161-157-157=626	+50	
30	West Germany	157-157-160-155=629	+53	
T31	Malaysia	155-157-165-153=630	+54	
T31	Sweden	157-160-156-157=630	+54	
33	Austria	152-162-157-160=631	+55	
T34	Burma	161-160-158-156=635	+59	
T34	Guatemala	159-163-153-160=635	+59	
T34	Netherlands	159-162-155-159=635	+59	
T34	Singapore	158-164-160-153=635	+59	
38	Portugal	161-161-156-161=639	+63	
39	Switzerland	157-167-156-163=643	+67	
40	Trinidad and Tobago	151-168-167-159=645	+69	
41	Dominican Republic	160-167-168-159=654	+78	
42	Paraguay	166-165-172-163=666	+90	
43	Israel	167-176-167-159=669	+93	
44	Costa Rica	170-169-172-162=673	+97	
45	Nigeria	162-175-168-170=675	+99	
46	Uruguay	169-169-161-178=676	+102	
47	Panama	176-182-173-170=701	+125	
WD	Greece			

International Trophy

Place	Player	Country	Score	To par	Money (US$)
1	Ernesto Perez Acosta	Mexico	69-74-69-70=282	−6	1,000
T2	Brian Barnes	Scotland	70-73-74-68=285	−3	183
T2	Dale Hayes	South Africa	74-69-71-71=285	−3	183
T2	Kuo Chie-Hsiung	Taiwan	69-71-70-75=285	−3	183
T2	Simon Owen	New Zealand	71-70-70-74=285	−3	183
T2	Jerry Pate	United States	70-74-69-72=285	−3	183
T2	Manuel Piñero	Spain	75-70-72-68=285	−3	183
8	Takashi Murakami	Japan	71-71-74-70=286	−2	
T9	Eamonn Darcy	Ireland	72-72-72-71=287	−1	
T9	Bob Shearer	Australia	71-74-69-73=287	−1	
