= Charlie Murray (golfer) =

Canadian professional golfer (1882–1938)

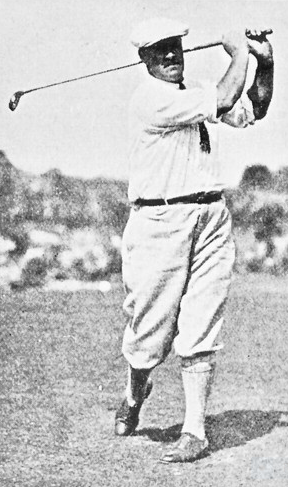
- Charlie Murray, c. 1915

Personal information
- Full name: Charles Richard Murray
- Nationality: England; Canada
- Born: 27 August 1882 Nottingham, England
- Died: 23 June 1938 (aged 55) Montreal, Quebec, Canada
- Height: 6 ft 2 in (1.88 m)
- Spouse: Barbara Louise Harris
- Children: 3

Career
- Sport: Golf
- Turned professional: 1900
- Professional wins: 13

Best results in major championships
- Masters Tournament: DNP
- PGA Championship: DNP
- U.S. Open: 9th: 1912
- The Open Championship: DNP

Achievements and awards
- Canadian Golf Hall of Fame: 1971
- PGA of Canada Hall of Fame: 2014

Charles Richard Murray (27 August 1882 – 23 June 1938) was a Canadian professional golfer who played in the late 19th century and early 20th century. His best finish in a major championship was ninth in the 1912 U.S. Open. Murray was a 9-time winner of the Quebec Open.

Murray won the Canadian Open twice, in 1906 and 1911, and won the inaugural Canadian PGA Championship in 1912. Murray and his brother Albert were co-founders of the PGA of Canada in 1911. In 1971 he was inducted into the Canadian Golf Hall of Fame.

== Early life ==
Charlie Murray was born in Nottingham, England, on 27 August 1882. At the age of six, he emigrated with his family to Canada. As a young lad in the early 1890s he caddied at the Toronto Golf Club where he learned the finer points of club-making and other skills necessary to be a professional golfer. He showed early promise as a player with great potential and was apprenticed under the watchful eye of George Cumming. Under Cumming's tutelage, Murray learned, in addition to club-making skills, the fundamentals of golf as both a player and teacher.

== Golf career ==
After two years as an assistant under Cumming, he was appointed as head professional in 1902 at the Toronto Hunt Polo and Golf Club. Thereafter he spent two years at Westmount Golf Club in Montreal before moving on to Royal Montreal Golf Club in 1905 where he would remain for the next 33 years. In 1924 he accepted a post at Gulf Stream Golf Club in Delray Beach, Florida, and for ten years thereafter would spend his winters in Florida and return to Royal Montreal in the summers. In addition to nine victories in the Quebec Open, Murray also won the Canadian Open twice—in 1906 and again in 1911—as well as the inaugural 1912 Canadian PGA Championship.

=== Golf course architecture ===
Murray did some golf course architecture with his brother Albert. Courses they collaborated on include the Kanawaki Golf Club, and the Whitlock Golf and Country Club. Charlie also made some alterations to toughen up the Royal Montreal old Dixie course at Dorval in preparation for the 1926 Canadian Open.

=== 1912 U.S. Open ===
The 1912 U.S. Open was the 18th U.S. Open, held August 1–2 at the Country Club of Buffalo in Amherst, New York, a suburb east of Buffalo. Murray finished alone in ninth place, shooting rounds of 75-78-77-76=306, and won $40 in prize money. John McDermott won the tournament.

=== Quebec Open ===
Murray won the Quebec Open nine times between 1909 and 1924. The tournament was not played from 1915 to 1919 due to World War I.

== Death and legacy ==
Murray died on 23 June 1938, aged 55, at the Royal Victoria Hospital in Montreal following an operation to correct a stomach ailment (cancer). The direct cause of death was a pulmonary embolism. He was survived by his wife Barbara and three sons—Kenneth, Gordon and Howard—and a brother, Albert, who was also a Canadian golf hall of famer.

Upon his death it was reported, "the Royal and Ancient pastime suffers an irreparable loss". He was inducted into the Canadian Golf Hall of Fame in 1971 and was a founding member of the PGA of Canada in 1911. Murray, along with his brother, Albert, was inducted into the PGA of Canada Hall of Fame in 2014. In 2015, Murray was inducted with his brother into the Canada's Sports Hall of Fame.

== Tournament wins ==
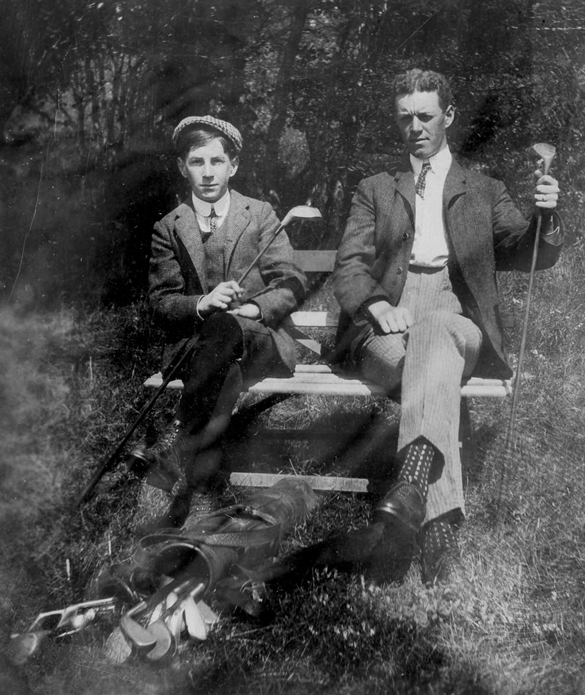
Charlie Murray (right) sitting with his younger brother Albert (left) in 1903

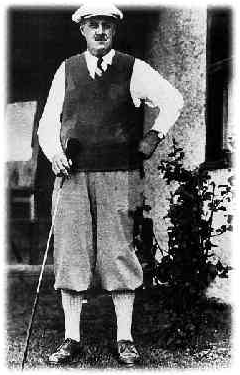
Charlie Murray at Royal Montreal Golf Club, c. 1912

Note: This list may be incomplete.

- 1906 Canadian Open
- 1909 Quebec Open (Note: Some sources indicate that he won this event 10 times.)
- 1911 Canadian Open,Quebec Open
- 1912 Canadian PGA Championship, Quebec Open
- 1913 Quebec Open
- 1914 Quebec Open
- 1921 Quebec Open
- 1922 Quebec Open
- 1923 Quebec Open
- 1924 Quebec Open
- 1933 Quebec Golf Association Spring Open

== Results in major championships ==
Tournament	1904	1905	1906	1907	1908	1909	1910	1911	1912	1913
U.S. Open	T11	T29	?	?	?	T31	?	?	9	T21

Note: Murray played only in the U.S. Open.

Top 10

T = tied for a place
? = unknown
