= Spring 1976 PGA Tour Qualifying School graduates =

This is a list of Spring 1976 PGA Tour Qualifying School graduates. The event was held at the Bay Tree Golf Club at North Myrtle Beach, South Carolina. There were 280 players at the event. The event lasted 108 holes in total. After 36 holes, the first cut would reduce the field to 140 players and ties. After 72 holes, the second cut would reduce the field to the low 60 and ties and any other players within 10 strokes of the lead.

== Tournament summary ==
Craig Stadler and David Strawn, both recent winners of the U.S. Amateur, were the favorites. This was the second time Mark Lye attempted to earn PGA Tour credentials at q-school. Billy Kratzert attended the school for the third straight year.

Australian Bob Shearer and American Woody Blackburn shared medallist honors at 426 (−6). Among the favorites, Stadler graduated, earning the last spot, while Strawn did not. Mark Lye unsuccessful in moving onto the PGA Tour once again. Kratzert was successful, however, this time.

== List of graduates ==
#	Player	Notes
T1	(United States) Woody Blackburn	
	(Australia) Bob Shearer	2 European Tour wins. 4 PGA Tour of Australasia wins
3	(United States) Bill Calfee	
T4	(United States) Al Brooks	
	(United States) Sam Farlow	
	(United States) Billy Kratzert	
7	(United States) Jeff Hewes	
T8	(United States) Morris Hatalsky	
	(United States) Bob Impaglia	
	(United States) David Lind	
11	(United States) Bill Brask	1 Sunshine Tour win. 1 PGA Tour of Australia win.
T12	(United States) Mike Craven	
	(United States) Jim Knoll	
	(United States) Elroy Marti	
	(United States) Craig Stadler	Winner of 1973 U.S. Amateur
