= Barry Vivian =

New Zealand professional golfer

Personal information
- Nationality: New Zealand
- Born: 10 May 1950 (age 76) Hawkes Bay, New Zealand
- Height: 6 ft 2 in (188 cm)
- Weight: 210 lb (95 kg)

Career
- Sport: Golf
- Turned professional: 1966
- Former tours: PGA Tour of Australasia; European Senior Tour
- Professional wins: 7

Number of wins by tour
- PGA Tour of Australasia: 1
- Other: 6

Barry Vivian (born 10 May 1950) is a New Zealand professional golfer. In the 1970s, he recorded a number of wins in minor events in the Pacific Islands but was unsuccessful on the more competitive circuits. He was thinking about quitting golf but a shock win at the 1979 Australian Masters gave him the confidence to continue his career. Vivian did not have many more highlights for the remainder of his regular career but as a senior he had much success. He posted a number of top finishes on the European Senior Tour while also recording victories at the New Zealand Senior PGA Championship and Australian PGA Seniors Championship.

== Early life ==
Vivian was born in the Hawke's Bay Region of New Zealand. He grew up in the city of Hastings, New Zealand.

== Professional career ==
In 1966, Vivian turned pro. Vivian did his apprenticeship at Hastings Golf Club. Overall, he worked at the club for eight years.

In 1974, Vivian quit work at Hastings. He decided to work as a touring professional. In the middle of the year, Vivian played some events on the European Tour. In November, he first received serious media attention for his performance at the City of Auckland Classic. He shot an opening round 68 (−3) to find himself in joint third with, among others, Hubert Green.

In August 1976, Vivian played the Fiji Open at Fiji Golf Club. He opened with a course record 67 (−5) to take the lead. Vivian shot a second round 71 to maintain the lead. In the third round, he shot a 74 but in the "wet conditions" he still held the lead, now one over Walter Godfrey. Vivian would go on to win the event. In November, he seriously competed for the New Zealand Airlines Classic held at Russley Golf Club. Vivian was at 206 (−13) entering the final round, two back of leader Bob Shearer. However, he was outplayed by several shots on Sunday and did not seriously contend. In 1976, Vivian also won an event in Western Samoa. He earned A$4,000 for the win. It was the highest check he earned in his career up to this point.

Vivian's good play qualified him for New Zealand's 1976 World Cup. The event was held in December in Palm Springs, California. His teammate was Simon Owen. Owen and Vivian arrived late and were not able to practice much at a golf course they not familiar with. In the opening round, Vivian shot a two-over-par 74 and coupled with Owen's 71 the pair was at 145 (+1), in a tie for fourth with Australia. In the third round, Vivian shot a 75 (+3) and the team was at 442 (+10), in a tie for seventh, 11 back of the United States. In the final round, Vivian shot another 74 and the team finished in ninth at 590 (+14). Individually, Vivian finished in a tie for 34th among 96 players.

In April 1977, Vivian seriously competed at the Western Australia PGA Championship. In a "tense finish" he had a chance to tie clubhouse leader Kel Nagle at the last hole. He was unable to birdie to the par-5 18th, however. At 284 (−4), he finished one back of champion Nagle in solo second. In August, he won the Pacific Harbour Open in Suva, Fiji defeating Terry Kendall and George Serhan in a playoff.

Vivian did not receive much media attention during the first half of 1978. Around the middle of the year, he considered giving up the career of a touring professional. However, he continued to play. In late 1978 he had some minor successes as a touring professional. In August, Vivian successfully repeated as Pacific Harbour Open champion. In October, he opened with a one-under-par 70 at the South Coast Open to position himself two off of the lead in a tie for fourth. Vivian shot even-par the next day and remained two back.

In March 1979, Vivian played excellently at the Australian Masters. His tournament began with an "inconspicuous start," however, as he bogeyed the first hole. However, Vivian birdied five of the next six holes. Early on the back nine he made three more birdies. Vivian experienced a "jolt" on the par-4 17th, three-putting for double bogey. However, he made a "curling" 15-metre putt on the final hole for his ninth birdie of the day. Overall, his 67 (−6) was a course record and gave him a two stroke lead. Vivian stated it was his best round ever in a tournament in Australia. In the second round, he again opened shakily but eventually settled down, making the turn at even-par for the day. He then played "faultlessly" on the back nine with four birdies for a four-under-par 69. He had a three-stroke lead over Bob Shearer. In the third round, Vivian shot, in his words, a "pretty hectic" even-par 73. It was enough to maintain a three shot lead over Shearer. Like previous rounds, Vivian did not open well, three-putting for bogey on the first hole. He ultimately shot a 40 (+3) on the front nine. His "horrific" day continued with bogeys on the 10th and 11th. There were severe winds, however, and few of Vivian's competitors were able to take advantage. His nearest competitor, Bob Shearer, made seven bogeys during the final round and ultimately shot a 78 (+5). Starting at the 12th hole, Vivian was able to settle down and make four consecutive pars. Vivian entered the final hole with a two stroke lead. His "concentration was upset" before his second shot by a helicopter; he hit his approach on the par-5 18th into a greenside bunker. His third shot from the bunker was a "flyer" into the crowd. Vivian then chipped on and two-putted for bogey. He won by one. "What a way to win," he said immediately after the event. It was his first "major" win after a number of minor victories in the Pacific islands. After the event Vivian stated, "I know my capabilities and I know I have been very fortunate this week." Vivian defeated a number of star golfers including Greg Norman and Lee Trevino.

In late 1979, Vivian qualified for New Zealand's World Cup team again. He was paired with Craig Owen, the brother of Simon Owen. Vivian shot an opening round 73 at Glyfada Golf Club in Athens, Greece. He played worse in the second round, shooting a 76 (+6). His playing partner Owen, however, played better with a 70. They had a 311 total after the first two days. Ultimately, the New Zealand pair finished 15th among 45 teams.

In 1980, Vivian had some success. In March, he seriously contended at the Royal Fremantle Open. In the first round, Vivian shot a two-over-par 74 to place himself in joint second place, two behind leader Ray Hore. The following day, he shot a 70 (−2), the round of the tournament, to tie Hore for the lead. Vivian shot a third round 71 (−1) to maintain the joint lead, this time with Chris Tickner. However, he "blew up" with a final round 77 (+5) to finish solo fourth, five behind champion Tickner. The following month, Vivian finished in second place at the Legacy-CIG pro-am, one behind Ian Stanley. In November, he placed high at the New South Wales Open. Vivian shot a final round 68 (−3), the round of the day, to move himself in a tie for third, one behind runner-up Sam Torrance. By virtue of these performances he was able to represent New Zealand at the 1980 World Cup in Bogota, Colombia. Paired with Craig Owen again, the team did not have a distinguished effort, finishing 25th among the 42 teams that finished.

For the remainder of the early 1980s, Vivian would have some minor successes as a professional golfer. In February 1981, he was the joint winner of the Victorian Open pro-am, tying Curtis Strange and Graham Marsh at 70 (−2). In 1983, in the third round, Vivian recorded a hole-in-one at the Resch's Pilsner Tweed Classic. In November 1983, Vivian had success at the Victorian PGA Championship. He shot an opening round 70 (−2) to place himself in the top-10. Vivian shot a second round 68 (−4) to move into solo second, four behind leader John Lister. He shot an even-par 72 the next day; though he fell to joint third he was only two shots back of leader Lister at this point. Vivian was not near the lead, however, as the tournament concluded. The following year, he had success at the 1984 New South Wales Open. Vivian recorded a hole-in-one on the par-3 9th hole. Unfortunately, it was a day too early for a free car promised by the sponsor. However, after the front nine on Sunday no other golfers in the tournament had recorded a hole-in-one on the hole. Mitsubishi, the sponsor, then decided give a car to Vivian. It was the first car he received after a number of aces in professional tournaments. In 1984, Vivian also won the Tahiti Open.

Within a few years, Vivian stopped playing as a touring professional. In 1988, he began work as club pro at a golf club in the Bay of Islands of New Zealand. Vivian worked there for 12 years.

=== Senior career ===
In May 2000, Vivian turned 50. He quickly began playing on the international senior circuits. In 2000, Vivian won seven events on the Australian Legends Tour, including the Australian PGA Seniors Championship and New Zealand PGA Seniors Championship. Late in the year, Vivian successfully qualified for the European Senior Tour, finishing in second place senior q-school in Spain. In May 2001, he started playing in Europe. It was the first time Vivian played pro golf in Europe since the mid-1970s. He had an immediate success in Europe, recording third place finishes in two of his first three events. Shortly thereafter, in his fifth event, he had a chance to win. Vivian was one back entering the final round of the Jersey Seniors Masters. Against "testing breezes," however, he shot a third round 74 (+2), finishing one out of a playoff. Overall in 2001, Vivian recorded seven top-10s in 15 events.

In 2002, Vivian played 13 events, recording a seven top-10s, including a runner-up finish at the Tobago Plantations Seniors Classic. The following season, despite serious back pain, he was able to record three top-10s among 10 events. This included a runner-up finish at the Scottish Senior Open. In 2004, Vivian played in six events but did not record any top-10s. In late 2004, he seriously competed at the Australian PGA Seniors Championship again. Vivian finished in solo third at 295 (+7), four out of a playoff. In 2005, he did not return to Europe. Back problems ultimately forced him to quit his career as a touring professional.

After he retired from the golf industry, Vivian worked in property development. As of 2013, at the age of 63, he still played golf recreationally.

== Personal life ==
As of 2013, Vivian lived in Kinloch, New Zealand.

== Professional wins (9) ==
=== PGA Tour of Australia wins (1) ===
No.	Date	Tournament	Winning score	Margin of victory	Runner-up
1	4 Mar 1979	Australian Masters	−3 (67-69-73-80=289)	1 stroke	(Australia) Bob Shearer

=== Other wins (6) ===
- 1976 Fiji Open, Western Samoan Open
- 1977 Pacific Harbour Open
- 1978 Pacific Harbour Open
- 1980 Pacific Harbour Open
- 1984 Tahiti Open

=== PGA of Australia Legends Tour wins (1) ===
- 2000 Australian PGA Seniors Championship

=== Other senior wins (1) ===
- 2000 New Zealand PGA Senior Championship

== Team appearances ==
- World Cup (representing New Zealand): 1976, 1979, 1980
