= 1978 World Cup (men's golf) =

Tournament information
- Dates: November 30 – December 3
- Location: Hanalei, Princeville, Hawaii, U.S. 22°12′24″N 159°30′3″W
- Courses: Hanalei, Makai course
- Format: 72 holes stroke play combined score

Statistics
- Par: 72
- Length: 6,940 yards (6,350 m)
- Field: 48 two-man teams
- Cut: None
- Winner's share: $6,000 team $3,000 individual

Champion
- United States; John Mahaffey & Andy North
- 564 (−12)

Location map
- Location in the Pacific Ocean Location in Kauaʻi County in the state of Hawaii, U.S.

The 1978 World Cup took place November 30 – December 3 at the Makai Golf Club in Hanalei in Kauaʻi County, Hawaii. It was the 26th World Cup event. The tournament was a 72-hole stroke play team event with 48 teams. Each team consisted of two players from a country. The combined score of each team determined the team results. The United States team of John Mahaffey and Andy North won by ten strokes over the Australian team of Wayne Grady and Greg Norman.

The individual competition for The International Trophy was won by Mahaffey two strokes ahead of North. Greg Norman and Thailand's Sukree Onsham tied for third.

== Teams ==
Country	Players
Argentina	Vicente Fernández and Florentino Molina
Australia	Wayne Grady and Greg Norman
Austria	Oswald Gartenmaier and Rudolph Hauser
Belgium	Yves Mahaim and Philippe Toussaint
Brazil	Josias Draxler and Jaime Gonzalez
Burma	Mya Aye and Mg Pyone
Canada	Dave Barr and Dan Halldorson
Chile	Anisio Araya and Francisco Cerda
Colombia	Luis Eduard Arevalo and Juan Pinzon
Denmark	Per Greve and Herluf Hansen
Dominican Republic	Jack Corrie and Ricardo Orellana
Egypt	Abdel Monem Hanafi and Mohamed Said Moussa
El Salvador	Carlos Sorroche and Bruno Vicentin
England	Howard Clark and Mark James
Fiji	Arun Kumar and Erami Bose Lutunatabua
Finland	Juhani Hämäläinen and Sigurd Nyström
France	Patrick Cotton and Jean Garaïalde
Greece	Basilli Anastassiou and Basilli Karatzas
Guatemala	Roberto Galindo and Hilario Polo
Hong Kong	Lai Wai Che and Peter Tang
Iceland	Ragnar Olafsson (a) and Björgvin Thorsteinsson (a)
Indonesia	Sumarno and Suparman
Ireland	Christy O'Connor Jnr and Eddie Polland
Israel	Brian Cooper and Barry Mandel
Italy	Renato Campagnoli and Geroiamo Delfino
Japan	Norio Suzuki and Shigeru Uchida
Malaysia	Lim Yat Foong and Nazamuddin Yusof
Mexico	Ernesto Perez Acosta and Victor Regalado
Netherlands	Jan Dorrestein and Simon van den Berg
New Zealand	Dennis Clark and Kim Southerden
Norway	Erik Dönnestad (a) and Tore Sviland (a)
Pakistan	Mehmood Hussain and Mohammad Eiaz Malik
Philippines	Rudy Lavares and Eleuterio Nival
Portugal	Domingos Silva and Rogerio Valente
Scotland	Ken Brown and Sam Torrance
Singapore	Alvin Liau and Sinniah Velasamy
South Africa	Nick Price and Bobby Verwey
South Korea	Hahn Chang–sang and Kim Suck-bong
Spain	Antonio Garrido and Manuel Piñero
Sweden	Hans Hedjerson and Gunnar Mueller
Switzerland	Denis Maina and Franco Salmina
Taiwan	Hsieh Yung-yo and Hsu Sheng-san
Thailand	Sukree Onsham and Seng Suwannakas
United States	John Mahaffey and Andy North
Venezuela	Noel Machado and Ramon Munoz
Wales	Craig Defoy and David Vaughan
West Germany	Bernhard Langer and Siegfried Vollrath
Yugoslavia	Rafael Jerman and Siavko Vodnjov

(a) denotes amateur

== Scores ==
Team

Place	Country	Score	To par	Money (US$)
1	United States	141-144-138-141=564	−12	6,000
2	Australia	142-146-146-143=574	−2	3,000
3	Canada	137-141-148-151=577	+1	1,800
3	England	146-146-146-139=577	+1	1,800
5	Scotland	143-150-145-141=579	+3	
6	Spain	145-146-141-148=580	+4	
7	Philippines	139-149-143-150=581	+5	
T8	Ireland	147-146-147-146=586	+10	
T8	Japan	149-140-150-147=586	+10	
T8	Mexico	142-152-143-148=586	+10	
T8	South Korea	142-148-149-147=586	+10	
T8	Taiwan	146-145-149-146=586	+10	
T8	Wales	146-146-147-147=586	+10	
T14	Argentina	141-151-148-147=587	+11	
T14	Colombia	144-145-146-152=587	+11	
T14	Sweden	145-147-149-146=587	+11	
17	Malaysia	151-146-148-144=589	+13	
18	South Africa	146-150-149-147=592	+16	
19	Venezuela	153-154-145-141=593	+17	
T20	West Germany	148-141-154-153=596	+20	
T20	France	149-148-150-149=596	+20	
22	Thailand	159-151-143-144=597	+21	
23	Brazil	145-161-143-151=600	+24	
24	Denmark	155-153-147-148=603	+27	
25	Italy	153-151-150-150=604	+28	
T26	Chile	146-161-153-145=605	+29	
T26	Egypt	149-154-149-152=605	+29	
28	Greece	156-152-151-148=607	+31	
29	Burma	150-153-154-153=610	+34	
30	Guatemala	155-158-150-149=612	+36	
T31	Hong Kong	155-167-150-141=613	+37	
T31	Singapore	156-158-149-150=613	+37	
33	Austria	148-157-159-150=614	+38	
34	New Zealand	159-151-154-153=617	+41	
35	Belgium	159-152-161-152=624	+48	
36	Netherlands	156-156-158-158=628	+52	
37	Fiji	157-164-155-156=632	+56	
38	Dominican Republic	154-163-158-159=634	+58	
T39	Indonesia	160-163-164-148=635	+59	
T39	Portugal	163-157-160-155=635	+59	
T41	Norway	166-158-157-158=639	+63	
T41	Pakistan	161-164-158-156=639	+63	
43	Israel	165-170-160-151=646	+70	
44	Switzerland	171-154-161-161=647	+71	
45	El Salvador	157-168-169-164=658	+82	
46	Iceland	172-163-165-160=660	+84	
47	Finland	169-169-162-172=672	+96	
48	Yugoslavia	173-182-177-171=703	+127	

International Trophy

Place	Player	Country	Score	To par	Money US$
1	John Mahaffey	United States	69-72-69-71=281	−7	3,000
2	Andy North	United States	72-72-69-70=283	−5	
T3	Greg Norman	Australia	71-69-74-72=286	−2	
T3	Sukree Onsham	Thailand	78-70-70-68=286	−2	
T5	Howard Clark	England	72-74-72-69=287	−1	
T5	Antonio Garrido	Spain	73-70-68-76=287	−1	
T5	Gunnar Mueller	Sweden	71-72-75-69=287	−1	
T5	Sam Torrance	Scotland	71-76-71-69=287	−1	
T9	Wayne Grady	Australia	71-74-72-71=288	E	
T9	Dan Halldorson	Canada	70-72-73-73=288	E	
T9	Eleuterio Nival	Philippines	69-75-70-74=288	E	
T9	Ernesto Perez Acosta	Mexico	71-74-70-73=288	E	
