= Woody Blackburn =

American professional golfer (born 1951)

Personal information
- Full name: Woody T. Blackburn
- Nationality: United States
- Born: July 26, 1951 (age 75) Pikeville, Kentucky, U.S.
- Height: 6 ft 2 in (1.88 m)
- Weight: 195 lb (88 kg; 13.9 st)

Career
- Sport: Golf
- College: University of Florida
- Turned professional: 1975
- Former tours: PGA Tour; Champions Tour
- Professional wins: 2

Number of wins by tour
- PGA Tour: 2

Best results in major championships
- Masters Tournament: T47: 1985
- PGA Championship: T40: 1985
- U.S. Open: T45: 1982
- The Open Championship: CUT: 1985

Woody T. Blackburn (born July 26, 1951) is an American former professional golfer who played on the PGA Tour in the 1970s and 1980s.

== Early life and amateur career ==
Blackburn was born in Pikeville, Kentucky. He attended the University of Florida in Gainesville, Florida, where he played for coach Buster Bishop's Florida Gators men's golf team from 1972 to 1975. Blackburn was a member of the Gators' 1973 Southeastern Conference (SEC) championship and NCAA Championship golf team, together with future fellow PGA Tour golfers Phil Hancock, Gary Koch and Andy Bean. Blackburn was a second-team All-SEC selection and an All-American during the Gators' championship season. He graduated from Florida with bachelor's degree in journalism in 1973.

== Professional career ==
In 1975, he turned pro. Blackburn's first win was at the 1976 Walt Disney World National Team Championship with playing partner Billy Kratzert. He also finished in a five-way tie for first at the 1981 Quad Cities Open, but lost in a playoff to Dave Barr.

He had a notably bad run of missing the cut in twenty of twenty-one tournaments and lost his PGA card in 1984, and was forced to requalify for the tour with the rookies. His second PGA Tour win came at the 1985 Isuzu-Andy Williams San Diego Open. En route to his first and only individual PGA victory, Blackburn set the 54-hole scoring record at 18-under-par (198), which Tiger Woods tied in 2008. His best finish in a major was a tie for fortieth at the 1985 PGA Championship.

== Personal life ==
Blackburn currently lives in Jacksonville, Florida.

== Professional wins (2) ==
=== PGA Tour wins (2) ===
No.	Date	Tournament	Winning score	Margin of victory	Runner(s)-up
1	Nov 7, 1976	Walt Disney World National Team Championship (with (United States) Billy Kratzert)	−28 (63-68-63-66=260)	Playoff	(United States) Gay Brewer and (United States) Bobby Nichols
2	Feb 17, 1985	Isuzu-Andy Williams San Diego Open	−19 (66-66-66-71=269)	Playoff	(United States) Ron Streck

PGA Tour playoff record (2–1)

No.	Year	Tournament	Opponent(s)	Result
1	1976	Walt Disney World National Team Championship (with (United States) Billy Kratzert)	(United States) Gay Brewer and (United States) Bobby Nichols	Won with birdie on third extra hole
2	1981	Quad Cities Open	(Canada) Dave Barr, (United States) Frank Conner, (Canada) Dan Halldorson, (Mexico) Victor Regalado	Barr won with par on eighth extra hole Conner, Halldorson and Regalado eliminated by birdie on first hole
3	1985	Isuzu-Andy Williams San Diego Open	(United States) Ron Streck	Won with par on fourth extra hole

== Results in major championships ==
Tournament	1977	1978	1979	1980	1981	1982	1983	1984	1985	1986	1987	1988
Masters Tournament	CUT								T47			
U.S. Open						T45			CUT			CUT
The Open Championship									CUT			
PGA Championship	CUT					73			T40			

Did not play

CUT = missed the half-way cut
"T" = tied

== See also ==
- Spring 1976 PGA Tour Qualifying School graduates
- 1984 PGA Tour Qualifying School graduates
- List of Florida Gators men's golfers on the PGA Tour
- List of University of Florida alumni
