= Sukree Onsham =

Thai professional golfer

Sukree Onsham (born 8 October 1944) is a professional golfer from Thailand. He was the most successful Thai golfer of his era.

== Professional career ==
Onsham started his career as the club professional for Royal Bangkok Sports Club in Bangkok, Thailand. He participated in the World Cup in 1969.

Onsham was the first man from Thailand to play in the Masters, playing in the 1970 and 1971 events. He missed the cut both years. He is often referred to as the first non-white person to play at the Masters; this is false. The Japanese golfers Torakichi Nakamura and Koichi Ono played in the 1958 Masters Tournament well before Onsham. Also several other players from Japan, Taiwan, and the Philippines played in the event during the 1960s.

Onsham had much success in 1972 on the international circuit. Early in the year at the Malaysian Open, he finished one behind Japan's Takashi Murakami, tying Walter Godfrey and American Marty Bohen for second. On 23 October 1972, Onsham finished runner-up to American Bob Murphy at the 1972 Wills Masters, an event on the Australian Tour held outside of Sydney. Two weeks later he posted another runner-up in Australia at the Dunlop International, four shots behind Tony Jacklin, finishing tied for second with David Graham. That year he also placed third at the Japan Open Golf Championship.

Two years later, Onsham won an event, the Malaysian Dunlop Masters, defeating Australia's Ted Ball and Malaysia's Bobby Lim by two shots.

Onsham's career began to wind down in the 1980s, however, he did have some success that decade. He finished runner-up at the 1981 Indonesia Open. A young Payne Stewart made a 20-foot birdie putt to defeat him and Taiwanese golfers Hsu Chi-San and Chen Tze-chung on the first playoff hole. As of 1988, he was a golf instructor.

Onsham also represented Thailand multiple times in the World Cup.

As a senior, he played on the European Senior Tour and Japan Seniors Tour from 1998 to 2000.

== Professional wins ==
- 1974 Malaysian Dunlop Masters
- 1983 Maruman Classic

== Playoff record ==
Asia Golf Circuit playoff record (0–1)

No.	Year	Tournament	Opponents	Result
1	1981	Indonesia Open	(Taiwan) Chen Tze-chung, (Taiwan) Hsu Chi-san, (United States) Payne Stewart	Stewart won with birdie on first extra hole

== Team appearances ==
- World Cup (representing Thailand): 1969, 1970, 1971, 1972, 1973, 1975, 1976, 1978, 1979, 1980, 1983, 1985
