= 1980 World Cup (men's golf) =

Tournament information
- Dates: 11–14 December
- Location: Bogotá, Colombia; 4°42′40″N 74°4′20″W
- Course: El Rincon Golf Club
- Format: 72 holes stroke play combined score

Statistics
- Par: 72
- Length: 7,542 yards (6,896 m)
- Field: 46 two-man teams
- Cut: None
- Winner's share: $6,000 team $3,000 individual

Champion
- Canada; Dan Halldorson & Jim Nelford
- 572 (−14)

Location map
- Location in South America Location in Colombia

The 1980 World Cup took place 11–14 December 1980 at the El Rincon Golf Club in Bogotá, Colombia. It was the 28th World Cup event. The tournament was a 72-hole stroke play team event with 45 teams. Each team consisted of two players from a country. 50 countries originally entered the four-day competition, but Jamaica, Uruguay and the Dominican Republic all withdrew shortly before the start. The team from the Netherlands quit the tournament when one of its players became ill. The combined score of each team determined the team results. A notable player withdrawal, before the tournament begun, was Seve Ballesteros, who was selected to the Spanish team and took part in the Colombian Open on a nearby course the week before, but, reportedly due to his demand of appearance money being denied, didn't play in the World Cup. The Canadian team of Dan Halldorson and Jim Nelford won by three strokes over the Scotland team of Sandy Lyle and Steve Martin. The individual competition for the International Trophy, was won by Lyle one stroke ahead of Bernhard Langer, West Germany.

== Teams ==
Country	Players
Argentina	Jorge Soto and Juan Cabrera
Australia	George Serhan and Bob Shaw
Austria	Rudolf Hauser and Oswald Gartenmaier
Belgium	Yves Mahaim and Jean Ver Plancke
Brazil	Jose Dinez and Rafael Navarro
Burma	Kyi Hla Han and Mya Aye
Canada	Jim Nelford and Dan Halldorson
Chile	Francesco Cerda and Jose Jeria
Colombia	Alberto Rivadeneira and Juan Pinzon
Costa Rica	Franco Jimenez and Jose Chavez
Denmark	Herluf Hansen and Hans Larsen
Ecuador	Pedro Cadena and Fausto Garces
Egypt	Mohamed Said Moussa and Abdel Monem Hanafi
England	Brian Waites and Carl Mason
Fiji	Bose Lutunatabua and Arun Kumar
France	Bernhard Pascassio and Jean Garaïalde
Greece	Bassili Karatzias and Bassili Anastassiou
Guatemala	Hilario Polo and Roberto Galindo
Hong Kong	Lee Parker and Yau Wah Tak
Ireland	John O'Leary and Des Smyth
Italy	Baldovino Dassù and Renato Campagnoli
Japan	Norio Suzuki and Haruo Yasuda
Malaysia	Eshak Bluah and Marimuthu Ramayah
Mexico	Ernesto Perez Acosta and Juan Galindo
Netherlands	(Note: The Netherlands team withdrew prior to the start of the tournament when one of its players became ill.)
New Zealand	Craig Owen and Barry Vivian
Norway	Tore Sviland (a) and Lars Erik Underthun (a)
Panama	Alberto Gonzalez and Juan Rivera
Paraguay	Sebastian Franco and Juan Fortlage
Peru	Niceforo Quispe and Lorenzo Rojas
Philippines	Ireneo Legaspi and Rudy Lavares
Portugal	Carlos Augostinho and Domingos Silva
Puerto Rico	Jesús Rodríguez and Carl James
Scotland	Sandy Lyle and Steve Martin
South Africa	Tienie Britz and Bobby Verway
South Korea	Heung So Kwak and Seung Hack Kim
Spain	Manuel Piñero and José María Cañizares
Sweden	Peter Lindwall and Jan Sonnevi
Switzerland	Francis Boillat and Patrick Bagnoud
Taiwan	Lu Liang-Huan and Lu Hsi-chuan
Thailand	Sukree Onsham and Santi Sopon
Trinidad and Tobago	Alan Mew and George Philips
United States	Johnny Miller and Mike Reid
Venezuela	Noel Machadoi and Ramón Muñoz
Wales	David Vaughan and Ian Woosnam
West Germany	Jurgen Harder and Bernhard Langer

(a) - denotes amateur

== Scores ==
Team

Place	Country	Score	To par	Money (US$)
1	Canada	144-143-139-146=572	−14	6,000
2	Scotland	147-143-143-142=575	−11	3,000
3	Taiwan	146-148-143-141=578	−8	2,400
4	Colombia	151-149-137-144=581	−5	1,200
5	South Africa	145-144-149-144=582	−4	
T6	United States	148-144-147-145=584	−2	
T6	Germany	150-148-141-145=584	−2	
T8	Mexico	148-146-147-144=585	−1	
T8	Ireland	144-144-152-145=585	−1	
T8	Spain	150-142-146-147=585	−1	
11	England	154-143-147-142=586	E	
12	Japan	144-144-150-153=591	+5	
13	Wales	141-153-148-154=596	+10	
14	Brazil	151-151-148-150=600	+14	
15	Chile	154-152-145-153=604	+18	
16	Philippines	152-146-151-156=605	+19	
T17	Italy	153-152-147-154=606	+20	
T17	Venezuela	150-157-145-154=606	+20	
T19	South Korea	156-154-148-150=608	+22	
T19	Thailand	154-156-149-151=606	+22	
21	Argentina	157-150-156-147=610	+24	
22	Austria	157-145-147-162=611	+25	
23	Malaysia	159-153-153-148=613	+27	
24	Sweden	158-167-146-150=621	+35	
25	New Zealand	160-154-155-156=625	+39	
26	Fiji	157-156-158-155=626	+40	
27	Greece	160-163-151-154=628	+42	
28	Egypt	162-159-155-154=630	+44	
29	Hong Kong	167-161-160-148=636	+50	
30	Peru	159-158-162-159=638	+52	
T31	Belgium	161-163-159-158=641	+55	
T31	Paraguay	157-163-163-158=641	+55	
T33	Denmark	164-156-160-163=643	+57	
T33	Guatemala	161-160-162-160=643	+57	
35	Norway	161-160-162-162=645	+59	
36	Trinidad and Tobago	168-161-159-158=646	+60	
T37	Ecuador	165-167-158-161=651	+65	
T37	Costa Rica	161-161-165-164=651	+65	
39	Switzerland	170-161-165-158=654	+68	
40	Puerto Rico	167-167-161-165=660	+74	
41	Portugal	166-163-170-163=662	+76	
42	Panama	175-162-162-169=668	+82	
DQ (Note: Jean Garaïalde and Bernhard Pascassio were both disqualified in the third round for signing incorrect scorecards after having tapped down spike marks without recording penalty strokes.)	France	152-144-DQ		
WD (Note: Bob Shaw withdrew due to illness; his teammate George Serhan continued to play.)	Australia			
WD (Note: Mya Aye withdrew due to illness; his teammate Kyi Hla Han continued to play.)	Burma			
WD (Note: The Netherlands team withdrew prior to the start of the tournament when one of its players became ill.)	Netherlands			

International Trophy

Place	Player	Country	Score	To par	Money (US$)
1	Sandy Lyle	Scotland	69-69-74-70=282	−6	3,000
2	Bernhard Langer	West Germany	73-72-70-68=283	−5	1,500
T3	Dan Halldorson	Canada	70-74-68-73=285	−3	900
T3	Lu Liang-huan	Taiwan	73-71-70-71=285	−3	900
T5	Mike Reid	United States	73-71-69-73=286	−2	
T5	Alberto Rivadeneira	Colombia	73-74-67-72=286	−2	
7	Jim Nelford	Canada	74-69-71-73=287	−1	
8	Ernesto Perez Acosta	Mexico	70-73-73-72=288	E	
9	Manuel Piñero	Spain	74-72-70-73=289	+1	
10	Tienie Britz	South Africa	70-74-74-72=290	+2	
10	Sukree Onsham	Thailand	74-72-71-73=290	+2	
