= Quebec Open (golf) =

Tournament information
- Location: Quebec, Canada
- Established: 1909
- Tour(s): PGA Tour Americas; Canadian Tour; Circuit Canada Pro Tour
- Format: Stroke play

Current champion
- (United States) Ryan Burnett

The Quebec Open is a golf tournament that is held in Quebec, Canada. It was first held in 1909.

The tournament was a regular event on the Canadian Tour and its predecessors until 1992 when loss of sponsorship led to it failing to meet tour minimum prize money requirements. It continued for several years, appearing on the tour again in 1996, before enduring an extended hiatus until it was revived in 2014. It then became a stop on the Circuit Canada Pro Tour until the circuit ceased operating at the start of 2019.

Originally a 36-hole stroke play event, the tournament was extended to 54 holes in 1966, only reverting to 36 holes in 1978 and 1979 following the demise of the Peter Jackson Tour. It became a 72-hole tournament in 1988, adopting shorter formats between 1992 and 1995 after dropping from the tour.

== Winners ==
Year	Venue	Winner	Score	Ref
Bromont Open
2024	Golf Château-Bromont	(United States) Ryan Burnett	258	
Quebec Open
2023	Golf Château-Bromont	(United States) Davis Lamb	258	
2022	Club de Golf Le Blainviller	(United States) Ryan Gerard	272	
2019–2021	No tournament			
Omnium du Quebec Canam
2018	Saint-Georges	(United States) Jake Scott	263 (Note: Scott won with a birdie on the first hole of a sudden-death playoff.)	
2017	Saint-Georges	(Canada) Marc-Étienne Bussières	267	
Promoutel Insurance Quebec Open
2016	Golf de La Faune	(Canada) Derek Gillespie	268	
2015	Golf de La Faune	(Canada) Dave Lévesque	276	
2014	Golf de La Faune	(Canada) Dave Lévesque	281	
Quebec Open
1997–2013	No tournament			
Montclair Quebec Open
1996	Dorval	(United States) Chris DiMarco	266	
Quebec Open
1995	No tournament			
1994	Dorval	(Canada) Stéphane Talbot	203	
1993	Milby	(Canada) Peter McCutcheon	134	
1992 (Note: Dropped from the Canadian Tour and reduced to a 36-hole event.)	Milby	(United States) Phillip Hatchett	139	
Lactantia–Sealtest Quebec Open
1991	Victoriaville	(United States) Phillip Hatchett	272	
1990	Victoriaville	(United States) Michael Bradley	272	
Lactantia Quebec Open
1989	Victoriaville	(United States) John Morse	277	
1988	Sorel-Tracy	(United States) Gene Elliott	273	
1987	Sorel-Tracy	(United States) Todd Erwin	207	
1986	Sorel-Tracy	(Canada) Dave Barr	209	
1985	Victoriaville	(Canada) Dave Barr	206	
1984	Victoriaville	(Canada) Daniel Talbot	208	
1983	Victoriaville	(Canada) Jerry Anderson	206	
1982	Victoriaville	(Canada) Jerry Anderson	205	
1981	Victoriaville	(Canada) Daniel Talbot	201	
1980	Victoriaville	(Canada) Dan Halldorson	205	
Quebec Open
1979	Victoriaville	(Canada) Daniel Talbot	137	
1978	Victoriaville	(Canada) Serge Thivierge	138	
1977	Sherbrooke	(Canada) Dave Barr	203	
1976	Sorel-Tracy	(United States) John Kindred	212	
1975	Rivermead	(United States) John Kindred	204	
1974	Whitlock	(Canada) Bob Panasiuk	214	
1973	Royal Quebec	(Canada) Ray Huot	209	
1972	Rosemère	(United States) Greg Pitzer	208	
1971	Summerlea	(United States) Jay Dolan	214	
1970	Lorette	(United States) Jay Dolan	210	
1969	Rivermead	(United States) Bob Payne	207	
1968	Islesmere	(United States) Dick Carmody	208	
1967	Saguenay-Arvida	(Canada) John Henrick	207	
1966	Pinegrove	(Canada) Moe Norman	204	
1965	Royal Quebec	(Canada) Adrien Bigras	145	
1964	Royal Montreal	(Canada) Stan Kolar	146	
1963	Sherbrooke	(Canada) Jack Bissegger	139	
1962	Beaconsfield	(Canada) Stanley Horne	143	
1961	Laval	(Canada) Bill Kerr	145	
1960	Summerlea	(Canada) Bill Kerr	140	
1959	Mount Bruno	(Canada) Ray Haines	143	
1958	Laval	(Canada) Jules Huot	142	
1957	Kanawaki	(Canada) Jack Kay	143	
1956	Whitlock	(Canada) Joe Leblanc	144	
1955	Laval	(Canada) Bill Kerr	144	
1954	Summerlea	(Canada) Dave Hardie	142	
1953	Lachute	(Canada) Stanley Horne	144	
1952	Islesmere	(Canada) Al Balding	143	
1951	Kanawaki	(Canada) Bob Gray	139	
1950	Ottawa Hunt	(Canada) Bob Gray	145	
1949	Elm Ridge	(Canada) Stanley Horne	139	
1948	Islesmere	(Canada) Bob Gray	145	
1947	Whitlock	(Canada) Rudy Horvath	144	
1946	Marlborough	(Canada) Stanley Horne	138	
1945	Laval	(Canada) Jules Huot	143	
1944	Marlborough	(Canada) Stanley Horne	145	
1943	Summerlea	(Canada) Bob Gray	149 (Note: Gray won after an 18-hole playoff; Bob Gray 70, Gerry Proulx 71, Rodolphe Huot 75, Phil Farley 78, Red MacKenzie 78.)	
1942	Royal Montreal	(Canada) Stanley Horne	139	
1941	Laval	(Canada) Gordon Brydson	139	
1940	Summerlea	(Canada) Bob Gray	139	
1939	Senneville	(Canada) Stanley Horne	143	
1938	Mount Bruno	(Canada) Dick Borthwick	141	
1937	Marlborough	(Canada) Stanley Horne	146	
1936	Laval	(Canada) Bobby Alston	144	
1935	Royal Montreal	(Canada) Jack Littler	145	
1934	Kanawaki	(Canada) Jules Huot	143	
1933	Islesmere	(Canada) Willie Lamb	141	
1932	Senneville	(Canada) Willie Lamb	145	
1931	Summerlea	(Canada) Willie Lamb	142	
1930	Montreal	(Canada) Albert Murray	138	
1929	Laval	(Canada) Arthur Hulbert	147	
1928	Kanawaki	(Canada) Jack Cameron	148	
1927	Royal Ottawa	(Canada) Karl Keffer	145 (Note: Keffer won after an 18-hole playoff; Karl Keffer 70, Jack Young 77.)	
1926	Whitlock	(Canada) Dave Spittal	153	
1925	Kanawaki	(Canada) J. R. Brown	150	
1924	Royal Montreal	(Canada) Charlie Murray	139	
1923	Beaconsfield	(Canada) Charlie Murray	151	
1922	Mount Bruno	(Canada) Charlie Murray	154	
1921	Beaconsfield	(Canada) Charlie Murray	141	
1920	Montreal	(Canada) Arthur Woodward	150	
1915–1919	No tournament due to World War I			
1914		(Canada) Charlie Murray	150	
1913		(Canada) Charlie Murray	153	
1912		(Canada) Charlie Murray	151	
1911		(Canada) Charlie Murray	151	
1910		(Canada) Albert Murray	150	
1909		(Canada) Charlie Murray	155	
