= Dave Barr (golfer) =

Canadian professional golfer

Personal information
- Full name: David Allen Barr
- Nickname: Hands
- Nationality: Canada
- Born: March 1, 1952 (age 74) Kelowna, British Columbia, Canada
- Height: 6 ft 1 in (1.85 m)
- Weight: 205 lb (93 kg; 14.6 st)

Career
- Sport: Golf
- College: Oral Roberts University
- Turned professional: 1974
- Former tours: PGA Tour; Canadian Tour; Champions Tour
- Professional wins: 19

Number of wins by tour
- PGA Tour: 2
- PGA Tour Champions: 1
- Other: 15 (regular); 1 (senior)

Best results in major championships
- Masters Tournament: T16: 1986
- PGA Championship: T38: 1985
- U.S. Open: T2: 1985
- The Open Championship: DNP

Achievements and awards
- Canadian Tour Order of Merit winner: 1986, 1988

David Allen Barr (born March 1, 1952) is a Canadian professional golfer who has played on the Canadian Tour, PGA Tour and Champions Tour.

== Early life and amateur career ==
Barr was born in Kelowna, British Columbia. He attended Oral Roberts University in Tulsa, Oklahoma and was a member of the golf team. He finished as runner-up in the 1972 Canadian Amateur Championship.

== Professional career ==
In 1974, Barr turned professional. From 1974 to 1978, he played on the Canadian Professional Golf Tour, where he earned 12 victories. He played on the PGA Tour from 1978 to 2002. He continued to support the Canadian circuit by playing several events per year, even after he joined the PGA Tour, although the Canadian events had much lower prize money.

Barr had two wins on the PGA Tour. His first, which he calls the biggest thrill of his golf career, was at the 1981 Quad Cities Open. In 1987, Barr won the Georgia-Pacific Atlanta Golf Classic. His best finish in a major was T2 at the 1985 U.S. Open.

After turning 50 in 2002, Barr began play on the Champions Tour. He became the first Canadian to win a Champions Tour event, the 2003 Royal Caribbean Golf Classic.

Barr won the 2007 Canadian PGA Seniors' Championship at The Marshes Golf Club in Ottawa. He was also given a lifetime membership on the Canadian Tour.

== Personal life ==
Barr lives in Kelowna, British Columbia.

== Awards and honors ==
- In 1986 and 1988, Barr earned the Order of Merit on the Canadian Tour
- In 2000, Barr was inducted into the Canadian Golf Hall of Fame
- Barr is a member of the British Columbia Sports Hall of Fame

== Professional wins (19) ==
=== PGA Tour wins (2) ===
| No. | Date | Tournament | Winning score | Margin of victory | Runner(s)-up |
|---|---|---|---|---|---|
| 1 | Jul 19, 1981 | Quad Cities Open | −10 (69-64-71-66=270) | Playoff | (United States) Woody Blackburn, (United States) Frank Conner, (Canada) Dan Halldorson, (Mexico) Victor Regalado |
| 2 | May 24, 1987 | Georgia-Pacific Atlanta Golf Classic | −23 (66-68-66-65=265) | 4 strokes | (United States) Larry Mize |

PGA Tour playoff record (1–2)

| No. | Year | Tournament | Opponent(s) | Result |
|---|---|---|---|---|
| 1 | 1981 | Quad Cities Open | (United States) Woody Blackburn, (United States) Frank Conner, (Canada) Dan Halldorson, (Mexico) Victor Regalado | Won with par on eighth extra hole Conner, Halldorson and Regalado eliminated by birdie on first hole |
| 2 | 1986 | Greater Milwaukee Open | (United States) Corey Pavin | Lost to birdie on fourth extra hole |
| 3 | 1988 | Canon Sammy Davis Jr.-Greater Hartford Open | (United States) Mark Brooks, (United States) Joey Sindelar | Brooks won with birdie on second extra hole Sindelar eliminated by par on first hole |

=== Canadian Tour wins (4) ===
| No. | Date | Tournament | Winning score | Margin of victory | Runner(s)-up |
|---|---|---|---|---|---|
| 1 | Jun 22, 1986 | Quebec Open | −7 (69-69-71=209) | Playoff | (United States) Dana Quigley |
| 2 | Aug 2, 1987 | Manitoba Open | −14 (66-65-67-68=266) | 1 stroke | (Australia) Mike Ferguson, (Australia) John Wade (a) |
| 3 | Jul 10, 1988 | Manitoba Open (2) | −10 (69-69-66-66=270) | 1 stroke | (Canada) Brian Hutton |
| 4 | Aug 7, 1988 | Canadian Tournament Players Championship | −14 (69-67-69-69=274) | Playoff | (Australia) Mark Officer |

=== Earlier Canadian wins (8) ===
- 1975 British Columbia Open
- 1977 British Columbia Open, Alberta Open, Quebec Open
- 1978 British Columbia Open
- 1981 Victoria Open
- 1985 Canadian PGA Championship, Quebec Open

=== Other wins (3) ===
- 1977 Washington Open
- 1983 World Cup (team with Dan Halldorson and individual event)

=== Champions Tour wins (1) ===
| No. | Date | Tournament | Winning score | Margin of victory | Runners-up |
|---|---|---|---|---|---|
| 1 | Feb 9, 2003 | Royal Caribbean Golf Classic | −9 (70-70-67=207) | 1 stroke | (United States) Gil Morgan, (United States) Bobby Wadkins |

=== Other senior wins (1) ===
- 2007 Canadian PGA Seniors' Championship

== Results in major championships ==
| Tournament | 1981 | 1982 | 1983 | 1984 | 1985 | 1986 | 1987 | 1988 | 1989 | 1990 | 1991 | 1992 | 1993 | 1994 |
|---|---|---|---|---|---|---|---|---|---|---|---|---|---|---|
| Masters Tournament | | CUT | | | | T16 | T50 | CUT | | | | | | |
| U.S. Open | 68 | | CUT | | T2 | T45 | WD | T25 | | T47 | CUT | | CUT | |
| PGA Championship | CUT | T42 | | 58 | T38 | T47 | | CUT | CUT | | T61 | | | CUT |

Note: Barr never played in The Open Championship.

Top 10
Did not play

CUT = missed the half-way cut
WD = withdrew
"T" = tied

=== Summary ===
| Tournament | Wins | 2nd | 3rd | Top-5 | Top-10 | Top-25 | Events | Cuts made |
|---|---|---|---|---|---|---|---|---|
| Masters Tournament | 0 | 0 | 0 | 0 | 0 | 1 | 4 | 2 |
| U.S. Open | 0 | 1 | 0 | 1 | 1 | 2 | 9 | 5 |
| The Open Championship | 0 | 0 | 0 | 0 | 0 | 0 | 0 | 0 |
| PGA Championship | 0 | 0 | 0 | 0 | 0 | 0 | 9 | 5 |
| Totals | 0 | 1 | 0 | 1 | 1 | 3 | 22 | 12 |

- Most consecutive cuts made – 7 (1984 PGA – 1987 Masters)
- Longest streak of top-10s – 1

== Canadian national team appearances ==
Amateur

- Eisenhower Trophy: 1972

Professional

- World Cup: 1977, 1978, 1982, 1983 (individual winner), 1984, 1985 (winners), 1987, 1988, 1989, 1990, 1991, 1993, 1994
- Dunhill Cup: 1985, 1986, 1987, 1988, 1989, 1991, 1993, 1994 (winners), 1995

== See also ==
- Fall 1977 PGA Tour Qualifying School graduates
- 1996 PGA Tour Qualifying School graduates
