= Victor Regalado =

Mexican professional golfer (born 1948)

Personal information
- Nationality: Mexico
- Born: 15 April 1948 (age 78) Tijuana, Mexico
- Height: 5 ft 10 in (1.78 m)
- Weight: 185 lb (84 kg; 13.2 st)

Career
- Sport: Golf
- Turned professional: 1971
- Former tour: PGA Tour
- Professional wins: 7

Number of wins by tour
- PGA Tour: 2
- Other: 5

Best results in major championships
- Masters Tournament: T30: 1975
- PGA Championship: T10: 1984
- U.S. Open: T24: 1978
- The Open Championship: DNP

Victor Regalado (born 15 April 1948) is a Mexican professional golfer who played on the PGA Tour.

== Early life and amateur career ==
Regalado was born and raised in Tijuana, Mexico. As an amateur, he played in tournaments in the San Diego, California area just across the border from his home.

Regalado represented Mexico twice in the amateur worlds at the Eisenhower Trophy. In 1970 at Madrid, Spain he finished on top of the individual competition, two strokes ahead of Dale Hayes of South Africa, and the Mexican team finished fifth overall.

== Professional career ==
Regalado turned professional in 1971. He had just over 30 top-10 finishes in PGA Tour events including two wins. His first win came at the 1974 Pleasant Valley Classic. His second win came at a tournament in which he enjoyed a great deal of career success: the Ed McMahon-Jaycees Quad Cities Open. He won there in 1978, after finishing runner-up the year before. He also finished runner-up in 1981 when he lost to Dave Barr in a sudden death playoff. His best finish in a major was T10 at the 1984 PGA Championship.

Regalado is currently one of only four native Mexican golfers to win on the PGA Tour, alongside Cesar Sanudo, Carlos Ortiz, and Abraham Ancer.

== Personal life ==
Regalado currently lives in San Diego.

== Amateur wins ==
- 1967 San Diego Men's Amateur Open
- 1970 San Diego Men's Amateur Open

== Professional wins (7) ==
=== PGA Tour wins (2) ===
| No. | Date | Tournament | Winning score | Margin of victory | Runner-up |
|---|---|---|---|---|---|
| 1 | 4 Aug 1974 | Pleasant Valley Classic | −6 (68-72-69-69=278) | 1 stroke | (United States) Tom Weiskopf |
| 2 | 16 Jul 1978 | Ed McMahon-Jaycees Quad Cities Open | −15 (67-64-68-70=269) | 1 stroke | (United States) Fred Marti |

PGA Tour playoff record (0–1)

| No. | Year | Tournament | Opponents | Result |
|---|---|---|---|---|
| 1 | 1981 | Quad Cities Open | (Canada) Dave Barr, (United States) Woody Blackburn, (United States) Frank Conner, (Canada) Dan Halldorson | Barr won with par on eighth extra hole Conner, Halldorson and Regalado eliminated by birdie on first hole |

=== Other wins (5) ===
- 1971 Mexican Masters
- 1972 Mexican Masters, Utah Open, Treasure Valley Open (Boise, Idaho)
- 1973 Mexican PGA Championship

== Results in major championships ==
| Tournament | 1974 | 1975 | 1976 | 1977 | 1978 | 1979 | 1980 | 1981 | 1982 | 1983 | 1984 | 1985 |
|---|---|---|---|---|---|---|---|---|---|---|---|---|
| Masters Tournament | | T30 | | | | T31 | | | | | | |
| U.S. Open | | | T35 | CUT | T24 | | | | | | | CUT |
| PGA Championship | T28 | T60 | | | T34 | | 76 | | | CUT | T10 | CUT |

Note: Regalado never played in The Open Championship.

Top 10
Did not play

CUT = missed the half-way cut
"T" = tied

== Team appearances ==
Amateur

- Eisenhower Trophy (representing Mexico): 1968, 1970 (individual leader)

Professional

- World Cup (representing Mexico): 1972, 1973, 1978, 1979, 1982, 1983

== See also ==
- 1972 PGA Tour Qualifying School graduates
