= Bob Byman =

American professional golfer (born 1955)

Personal information
- Full name: Robert Thomas Byman
- Nationality: United States
- Born: April 25, 1955 (age 71) Poughkeepsie, New York, U.S.
- Height: 5 ft 10 in (1.78 m)
- Weight: 175 lb (79 kg; 12.5 st)

Career
- Sport: Golf
- College: Wake Forest University
- Turned professional: 1976
- Former tours: PGA Tour; European Tour; European Seniors Tour
- Professional wins: 6

Number of wins by tour
- PGA Tour: 1
- European Tour: 4
- Other: 1

Best results in major championships
- Masters Tournament: T34: 1979
- PGA Championship: 77th: 1980
- U.S. Open: CUT: 1983
- The Open Championship: T7: 1979

Robert Thomas Byman (born April 25, 1955) is an American professional golfer who played on the PGA Tour.

== Early life ==
Byman was born in Poughkeepsie, New York, but moved to Colorado when 13 years old. He only lived in Colorado for five years, but won the state amateur stroke-play championship three years in a row 1971–73, the first player since Hale Irwin 1963–65 to do so. As a 17-year-old, he won the U.S Junior Amateur, beating Scott Simpson in the final.

== Amateur career ==
Byman attended Wake Forest University in Winston-Salem, North Carolina and was a member of the golf team. He played with Jay Haas and Curtis Strange on the 1974 and 1975 teams, which won the NCAA Division I Men's Golf Championships. Golf World has called the 1974–75 teams "the greatest college team of all time". At the end of 1976 Golf Digest ranked Byman the No. 2 amateur in the country behind only Scott Simpson.

== Professional career ==
Byman turned pro in 1976. He spent the early part of his professional career playing on the European Tour, where he had a great deal of success, winning four times. Tiger Woods is the only American golfer with more regular European Tour wins. He played full-time on the PGA Tour 1979–84. His best year was 1979 when he won the Bay Hill Citrus Classic in a playoff against John Schroeder, earned $94,243, and made the cut in all 20 of his starts. His best finish in a major championship was T-7 in the 1979 British Open.

Byman also won the New Zealand Open, an official event on the Australian Tour.

Byman played on the European Seniors Tour in 2005.

== Amateur wins (6) ==
this list may be incomplete

- 1971 Colorado Amateur
- 1972 U.S. Junior Amateur, Colorado Amateur
- 1973 Colorado Amateur
- 1976 Northeast Amateur, Rice Planters Amateur

== Professional wins (6) ==
=== PGA Tour wins (1) ===
No.	Date	Tournament	Winning score	Margin of victory	Runner-up
1	Mar 4, 1979	Bay Hill Citrus Classic	−6 (67-70-70-71=278)	Playoff	(United States) John Schroeder

PGA Tour playoff record (1–0)

No.	Year	Tournament	Opponent	Result
1	1979	Bay Hill Citrus Classic	(United States) John Schroeder	Won with par on second extra hole

=== European Tour wins (4) ===
No.	Date	Tournament	Winning score	Margin of victory	Runner-up
1	Jul 24, 1977	Scandinavian Enterprise Open	−13 (70-69-68-68=275)	1 stroke	(South Africa) Hugh Baiocchi
2	Aug 14, 1977	Dutch Open	−10 (69-70-68-71=278)	1 stroke	(South Africa) Hugh Baiocchi
3	Jul 23, 1978	Dutch Open (2)	−2 (74-72-68=214) (Note: Shortened to 54 holes due to a player controversy.)	1 stroke	(Zimbabwe) Nick Price
4	Jul 4, 1982	Scandinavian Enterprise Open (2)	−9 (69-69-66-71=275)	3 strokes	(Scotland) Sam Torrance

=== New Zealand Golf Circuit wins (1) ===
No.	Date	Tournament	Winning score	Margin of victory	Runner-up
1	Dec 11, 1977	New Zealand Open	+6 (66-72-78-74=290)	1 stroke	(Australia) Terry Gale

== Results in major championships ==
Tournament	1972	1973	1974	1975	1976	1977	1978	1979	1980	1981	1982	1983	1984	1985
Masters Tournament								T34						
U.S. Open	CUT				CUT		CUT	CUT		CUT		CUT		
The Open Championship							T17	T7	CUT					CUT
PGA Championship								T21	77					

Top 10
Did not play

CUT = missed the half-way cut
"T" = tied

== See also ==
- Spring 1978 PGA Tour Qualifying School graduates
