= Ken Brown (golfer) =

Scottish golfer

Ken Brown MBE
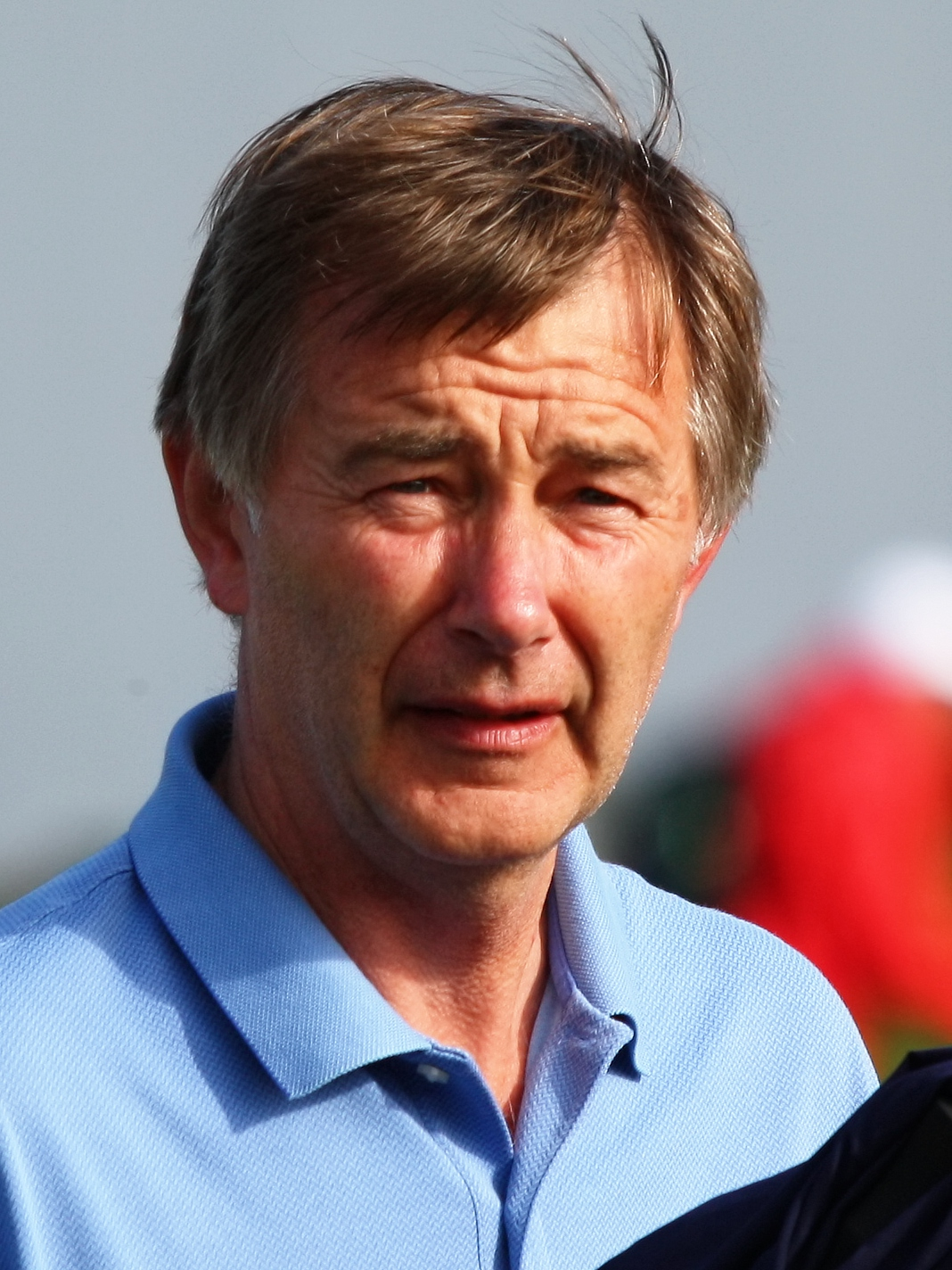
- Brown at the 2010 Women's British Open

Personal information
- Full name: Kenneth John Brown
- Nationality: Scotland
- Born: 9 January 1957 (age 69) Harpenden, Hertfordshire, England
- Height: 6 ft 1 in (1.85 m)

Career
- Sport: Golf
- Turned professional: 1974
- Former tours: PGA Tour; European Tour; Safari Circuit
- Professional wins: 9
- Highest ranking: 60 (17 April 1988)

Number of wins by tour
- PGA Tour: 1
- European Tour: 4
- Other: 4

Best results in major championships
- Masters Tournament: T36: 1988
- PGA Championship: T24: 1987
- U.S. Open: DNP
- The Open Championship: T6: 1980

Kenneth John Brown (born 9 January 1957) is a Scottish former professional golfer who now works as a golf broadcaster and writer. He won the 1987 Southern Open on the PGA Tour and won four times on the European Tour. Brown played in five Ryder Cup matches between 1977 and 1987.

== Amateur career ==
Brown had a brief period as an amateur. In 1974 he won the Carris Trophy, the English Boys Amateur Stroke-Play Championship at Moor Park. Despite a last round 81 he finished two strokes ahead of Paul Downes and Sandy Lyle. Later in 1974 he represented England boys in their international against Scotland, an England team that also included Nick Faldo and Sandy Lyle. After leaving school, Brown had been a greenkeeper at his home club of Harpenden Common before becoming an assistant professional at Verulam Golf Club in late 1974.

== Professional career ==
Brown played on the European Tour from 1976 to 1992. He won four times on the tour between 1978 and 1985. His first win was in the 1978 Carroll's Irish Open where he finished a stroke ahead of Seve Ballesteros and John O'Leary. He had further wins in the 1983 KLM Dutch Open, the 1984 Glasgow Open and the 1985 Four Stars National Pro-Celebrity. He often performed well in the British PGA Championship, finishing runner-up or joint runner-up four times between 1978 and 1983, three times behind Nick Faldo and then behind Seve Ballesteros. Brown finished in the top-10 of European Tour Order of Merit in 1978, 1979, 1980 and 1983. His best season was 1978 when he finished fourth in the Order of Merit.

Brown gained his PGA Tour card at 1983 PGA Tour Qualifying School. He played mainly on the PGA Tour from 1984 to early 1989, winning the Southern Open in 1987. Brown struggled in the early part of his first season, 1984, but from August he made the cut in his last 10 tournaments. Despite this he was 151st in the money list coming into the final event of the year, the Pensacola Open, and unlikely to retain his card by finishing in the top 125. Leading after three rounds, he eventually finished joint runner-up, lifting him to 112th in the money list. 1987 was his best season on the tour with six top-10 finishes. Brown had a poor start to the 1989 PGA Tour season and played the remainder of the season in Europe, losing his PGA Tour card. He continued to play on the European Tour but had relatively little success and retired in 1992.

Brown played in five Ryder Cup matches, in 1977, 1979, 1983, 1985 and 1987. He had a 4-9-0 win–loss–tie record, including two wins and two losses in singles matches. He was vice-captain under Mark James in the 1999 matches.

Tony Jacklin called the "disruptive behaviour" of Brown and Mark James before and during the 1979 event "a total disgrace"; each was fined and later served a ban from playing in international fixtures.

In 1977 Brown switched his allegiance from England to Scotland and later represented Scotland in a number of team competitions, including the World Cup on four occasions. Playing with Sandy Lyle they finished second in the 1979 World Cup. Brown played in the Open Championship 14 times. His best performance was in the 1980 Open at Muirfield where he was tied for second place after three rounds but a final round of 76 left him in a tie for sixth place.

== Broadcasting ==
After retiring from playing, Brown has spent much of his time as a TV golf commentator and analyst, for the BBC and Fox Sports. He also worked as part of the commentary team for the international coverage of the European Tour on selected events. He started his TV work with Sky Sports, working on their PGA Tour and European Tour coverage in the early 1990s.

== Awards ==
Brown was appointed Member of the Order of the British Empire (MBE) in the 2019 Birthday Honours for services to sport and to broadcasting.

== Amateur wins ==
- 1973 Herts Boys Championship
- 1974 Carris Trophy, South Eastern Boys Championship

== Professional wins (9) ==
=== PGA Tour wins (1) ===
No.	Date	Tournament	Winning score	Margin of victory	Runners-up
1	4 Oct 1987	Southern Open	−14 (65-64-69-68=266)	7 strokes	(South Africa) David Frost, (United States) Mike Hulbert, (United States) Larry Mize

=== European Tour wins (4) ===
No.	Date	Tournament	Winning score	Margin of victory	Runner(s)-up
1	27 Aug 1978	Carroll's Irish Open	−7 (70-71-70-70=281)	1 stroke	(Spain) Seve Ballesteros, (Republic of Ireland) John O'Leary
2	7 Aug 1983	KLM Dutch Open	−14 (66-73-66-69=274)	1 stroke	(Spain) José María Cañizares, (Australia) Vaughan Somers
3	1 Jul 1984	Glasgow Open	−14 (63-65-67-71=266)	11 strokes	(Scotland) Sam Torrance
4	2 Jun 1985	Four Stars National Pro-Celebrity	−3 (71-68-69-69=277)	1 stroke	(Scotland) Gordon Brand Jnr

European Tour playoff record (0–2)

No.	Year	Tournament	Opponent(s)	Result
1	1983	Italian Open	(Spain) Seve Ballesteros, (West Germany) Bernhard Langer	Langer won with birdie on second extra hole Ballesteros eliminated by par on first hole
2	1986	Panasonic European Open	(Australia) Greg Norman	Lost to birdie on first extra hole

=== Safari Circuit wins (1) ===
No.	Date	Tournament	Winning score	Margin of victory	Runner-up
1	13 Mar 1983	Benson & Hedges Kenya Open	−10 (69-71-68-66=274)	1 stroke	(England) Jeff Hall

=== Other wins (3) ===
- 1975 Hertfordshire Professional Championship, Hertfordshire Assistants, Southern Assistant Championship

== Results in major championships ==
Tournament	1976	1977	1978	1979	1980	1981	1982	1983	1984	1985	1986	1987	1988	1989
Masters Tournament													T36	
The Open Championship	CUT	T34	T34	T19	T6	T44	19	CUT	T14	CUT	CUT	T17	T38	CUT
PGA Championship											70	T24	CUT	

Note: Brown never played in the U.S. Open.

Top 10
Did not play

CUT = missed the half-way cut
"T" = tied

== Team appearances ==
- Ryder Cup (representing Europe): 1977, 1979, 1983, 1985 (winners), 1987 (winners)
- World Cup (representing Scotland): 1977, 1978, 1979, 1983
- Double Diamond International (representing Scotland): 1977
- Hennessy Cognac Cup (representing Great Britain and Ireland): 1978 (winners), (representing Scotland): 1984
- Kirin Cup (representing Europe): 1987

== See also ==
- 1983 PGA Tour Qualifying School graduates
