= IMG (company) =

Global sports, events and talent management company

IMG Worldwide, LLC
- Type: Subsidiary
- Founded: 1960; 66 years ago
- Founder: Mark McCormack
- Headquarters: New York City, United States
- Area served: 25+ countries
- Key people: Ari Emanuel (CEO); Adam Kelly (president)
- Number of employees: 3,000+
- Parent: TKO Group Holdings
- Divisions: Learfield IMG College; Art + Commerce; IMG Events; IMG Fashion; IMG Media; IMG Rights; IMG Productions; Others
- Website: img.com

IMG, originally known as the International Management Group, is an American sports, fashion, events and media company headquartered in New York City. The company manages athletes and fashion celebrities; owns, operates and commercially represents live events; and is an independent producer and distributor of sports and entertainment media.

== History ==
IMG was founded in 1960 in Cleveland, Ohio, by Mark McCormack, an American lawyer who spotted the potential for athletes to make large incomes from endorsement in the television age. He signed professional golfers Arnold Palmer, Gary Player and Jack Nicklaus as his first clients who collectively are known as The Big Three. McCormack died in 2003.

In 2004, Forstmann Little, led by Theodore J. Forstmann, acquired the company; Forstmann was chairman and CEO until his death in late 2011.

On June 1, 2006, IMG Media acquired Tiger Aspect Productions, the producer of the British television series Mr. Bean and the company, along with Darlow Smithson Productions (also acquired in 2006) was later sold to Endemol in November 2009. nunet, a provider of mobile TV services to mobile network operators around the world, was also acquired by IMG. Clients of nunet's mobile TV CMS included Vodafone, Proximus, Vodacom, and Mobilkom A1, and content distributed by nunet included MTV, Fashion TV, Eurosport, and Discovery Networks. nunet was later sold to KIT Digital, Inc. in 2009.

In November 2007, IMG acquired Kentucky-based Host Communications, which had multiple business units with services ranging from sports marketing and broadcasting to the management of associations and non-profit organizations. The sports-related businesses were combined with the Collegiate Licensing Company (CLC) to form IMG College, while the association management division was renamed IMG Associations.

IMG was originally headquartered in downtown Cleveland in a complex built in 1965 across the street from Erieview Tower. When the IMG Center was built, it originally housed the Cuyahoga Saving Bank, which was acquired by Charter One Bank in 1998.

In 1997, IMG renovated the Cuyahoga Savings Bank Building and renamed it IMG Center. Following the acquisition of IMG by Forstmann Little, the headquarters remained in Cleveland, Ohio, for several years until officially relocating to its parent company's existing offices in New York, in 2010, though the IMG Center is still located on East Ninth Street in Cleveland.

On October 15, 2010, IMG acquired ISP, the multimedia rights holder for more than 50 universities based in Winston-Salem, North Carolina. As a result of the acquisition, IMG College retained ISP's former headquarters in Winston-Salem.

On December 18, 2013, IMG was acquired by William Morris Endeavor and Silver Lake Partners in a $2.4 billion deal to form WME-IMG. WME's Ari Emanuel and Patrick Whitesell were co-CEOs.

WME-IMG reorganized in October 2017 with the parent company being renamed from WME-IMG to Endeavor, and IMG and WME becoming subsidiaries of Endeavor. Ari Emanuel became Endeavor CEO and Patrick Whitesell became Endeavor executive chairman.

On October 23, 2024, it was announced that TKO Group would acquire several businesses from Endeavor, including IMG (aside from "businesses associated with the IMG brand in licensing, models, and tennis representation, nor IMG's full events portfolio"), as part of a $3.25 billion deal, with the transaction expected to close in the first half of 2025. The deal was completed on February 28, 2025.

== Divisions ==
=== Media ===
IMG's Media Division produces, develops and executes multi-channel distribution strategies for federations, associations and events working with major global broadcasters, channels and platforms. Each year it delivers 45,000 hours of content originating from over 200 clients.

The company's multimedia product offering includes production of Channel 4's England men's UEFA Nations League and European Qualifiers and Super League rugby coverage, CBS' UEFA Champions League coverage, the DP World Tour and Ryder Cup coverage, and the Premier League's international broadcast feed.

IMG also produces and distributes Sport 24, the live, linear sports channel for the airline and cruise industries, and EDGEsport, the linear action sports channel.

In 2012, IMG created IMG ARENA, a sports data and technology company for the betting, media and professional sectors.

Endeavor acquired Mailman Group in 2021, and its UK-based Seven League digital marketing agency was integrated into IMG's Media division.

Trans World Sport was one of the first productions created by TWI/IMG when it began weekly production in May 1987. The 49-minute sports magazine programme airs in numerous countries around the world and is owned and distributed by IMG

In 2015, IMG and Euroleague Basketball agreed on a ten-year joint venture. Together they will manage the commercial operation, and management of all global rights covering both media and marketing of the EuroLeague (the premier competition for European professional men's basketball clubs) and its 2nd-tier competition, the EuroCup.

In April 2022, the Global Esports Federation (GEF) announced IMG Media as their strategic partners and as a result the Commonwealth Esports Championship was formed.

=== Archive ===
IMG's Archive Services (also known as IMG Replay) houses the largest sports archive platform with over 500,000 hours of content dating back over 120 years including event footage, highlights, interviews, ISOs and programming, available in 4K, 3D and HR=D.

IMG Replay currently works with over 39 rights holders helping to digitize, monetize, and market their archive content, including:

- ATP Media
- Cricket South Africa
- Deutsche Fußball Liga (Bundesliga and DFL-Supercup only)
- PGA European Tour
- World Athletics (Diamond League only)
- EFL
- Euroleague Basketball
- Football Australia
- Frank Warren
- FIVB
- LPGA
- Augusta National Inc.
- FIM
- ANFP
- PBR
- Premier League Productions (until 2026)
- Giro d'Italia
- PGA of America (American Ryder Cup matches only)
- Ryder Cup Europe (European matches only)
- KNVB (Eredivisie and Johan Cruyff Shield only)
- SAFF (Saudi Pro League and King's Cup only)
- Scottish Football Association (Scottish Cup only)
- Liga Portugal (Liga Portugal 1 only)
- The Football Association
- The R&A
- Trans World Sport (fully owned by IMG)
- UEFA (UEFA Champions League and the UEFA Super Cup only)
- UCI
- UFC
- USTA (US Open only)
- WTA
- All England Lawn Tennis Club (The Championships, Wimbledon only)
- World Rugby
- WPBSA
- WTT

=== IMG Models ===
IMG Models is an international modelling agency headquartered in New York City and with additional offices in London, Los Angeles, Milan, Paris, and Sydney. In 2025, following IMG's sale to TKO Group Holdings, IMG Models was spun-off from IMG to remain under the full ownership of Endeavor.

=== Consulting ===
IMG's Consulting division works with rights holders and brands on commercial, marketing, and sponsorship strategy. IMG Consulting's stadium and arena group works with sports leagues and franchises.

In Brazil, IMG worked with local affiliate IMM, with clients involved with the FIFA 2014 World Cup and the Rio 2016 Summer Olympics.

=== Events ===
IMG owns, produces and commercially represents hundreds of events worldwide.

==== Art ====
IMG Events produces art events for:

- Frieze Art Fair (sold to MARI by IMG in 2025)

==== Association football ====
IMG Events produces football events for:

- Premier League (Ended in 2026)
- EFL
- Liga Portugal
  - Liga Portugal 1
- Deutsche Fußball Liga
  - Bundesliga
    - DFL-Supercup
- UEFA
  - UEFA men's club competitions
- The Football Association
  - England qualifying and friendly matches
  - FA Community Shield
  - FA Cup
  - Women's Super League
- SAFF
  - Saudi Pro League
    - Saudi Super Cup
  - King's Cup

==== Basketball ====
IMG Events produces basketball events for:

- EuroLeague
- EuroCup
- FIBA Basketball World Cup (2023)

==== Entertainment ====
IMG Events produces entertainment events for:

- Miss Teen USA (sold to JKN Global Group by IMG on October 26, 2022)
- Miss USA (sold to JKN Global Group by IMG on October 26, 2022)
- Miss Universe (sold to JKN Global Group by IMG on October 26, 2022)
- Taste Festivals (sold to MARI by IMG in 2025)
- Hyde Park Winter Wonderland (sold to MARI by IMG in 2025)
- Barrett-Jackson (sold to MARI by IMG in 2025)
- GLIDE at Battersea Power Station (sold to MARI by IMG in 2025)
- GLIDE at Brooklyn Bridge Park (sold to MARI by IMG in 2025)
- The Chimney Lift at Battersea Power Station (sold to MARI by IMG in 2025)
- Lumieres En Seine
- Windsor Great Park Illuminated
- Incanto di Luci
- Hampton Court Palace Festival (sold to MARI by IMG in 2025)
- Melbourne International Flower and Garden Show (sold to MARI by IMG in 2025)
- The Big Feastival (sold to MARI by IMG in 2025)
- Hall Des Lumieres

==== Figure skating ====
IMG Events produces figure skating events for:

- Stars on Ice (fully owned by IMG)

==== Golf ====
IMG Events produces golf events for:

- Acciona Open de Espana
- Australian Open
- Abu Dhabi HSBC Golf Championship (fully owned by IMG)
- Alfred Dunhill Links Championship (fully owned by IMG)
- Arnold Palmer Invitational
- Cambia Portland Classic
- Chevron Championship
- The Masters
- Ryder Cup
  - U.S. matches
  - European matches
- Honda LPGA Thailand (fully owned by IMG)
- HSBC Women's Champions
- International Series Egypt
- PGA European Tour
- PNC Championship
- R&A
  - The Open Championship
  - Senior Open Championship
  - Women's British Open
- Reingwood LPGA Classic
- Sime Darby LPGA Malaysia
- Swinging Skirts LPGA Classic
- Thailand Golf Championship
- WGC-HSBC Champions
- Shinhan Donghae Open

==== Motorsports ====
IMG Events produces motorsport events for:

- Formula D (fully owned by IMG)
- MotoGP

==== Rugby league ====
IMG Events produces rugby league events for:

- Super League

==== Running and triathlon ====
IMG Events produces running/triathlon events for:

- Escape from Alcatraz (sold to MARI by IMG in 2025)
- Great Ocean Road Marathon (sold to MARI by IMG in 2025)
- Melbourne Marathon (sold to MARI by IMG in 2025)

==== Strongman ====
IMG Events produces strongman events for:

- World's Strongest Man (fully owned by IMG)

==== Surfing ====
IMG Events produces surfing events for:

- US Open of Surfing (sold to MARI by IMG in 2025)

==== Tennis ====
IMG Events produces tennis events for:

- ATP Champions Tour
- Apia International Sydney
- Bank of the West Classic
- Giorgio Armani Tennis Classic at Hurlingham (sold to MARI by IMG in 2025)
- Miami Open (sold to MARI by IMG in 2025)
- Madrid Open (sold to MARI by IMG in 2025)
- Mubadala Abu Dhabi Open (sold to MARI by IMG in 2025)
- The Championships, Wimbledon
- US Open
- Chengdu Open (sold to MARI by IMG in 2025)
- Tunisia Jasmin Open
- Rakuten Japan Open
- Barcelona Open Banc Sabadell

==== Volleyball ====
IMG Events produces volleyball events for:

- FIVB Volleyball Men's Nations League (joint venture with Fédération Internationale de Volleyball)
- FIVB Volleyball Women's Nations League (joint venture with Fédération Internationale de Volleyball)

=== IMG College ===
In late 2007, IMG acquired Host Communications and the Collegiate Licensing Company to form IMG College (later known as Learfield). In 2010 IMG acquired ISP Sports, which was based in Winston-Salem, North Carolina. Today, IMG represents the multimedia rights for more than 90 universities, conferences, collegiate associations and venues along with the licensing rights to more than 150 colleges and universities as well as the College Football Playoff. Additionally, IMG Seating serves more than 100 universities, and IMG Learfield Ticket Solutions provides outsourced ticketing services to universities.

=== Fashion ===
- Berlin Fashion Week
- Mercedes-Benz Fashion Week Russia
- Miami Swim Week
- New York Fashion Week
- Toronto Fashion Week (sold to the Bashful Group by IMG in November 2024)
- Australian Fashion Week (sold to Freed Developments by IMG in November 2024)

=== Licensing ===
IMG's Licensing Division works in trademark licensing and currently provides its services to more than 100 Licensors of intellectual property. In 2025, following IMG's sale to TKO Group Holdings, IMG Licensing was spun-off from IMG to remain under the full ownership of Endeavor.

=== eSports ===
IMG eSports represents the commercial rights for numerous game publishers and tournament operators, including:

- PGL
- DPC WEU Tour
- DPC NA Tour
- EVO
- EVO Japan
- EVO Las Vegas
- Combo Breaker
- CEO
- East Coast Throwdown
- First Attack
- Versus Fighting
- UFA
- Global Esports Federation
- Global Esport Tours
- Global Esports Games

=== TV channels ===
==== Sport 24 ====
Sport 24 is a 24/7 live sports television channel owned by IMG, which is available on international airlines including AeroMéxico, Air New Zealand, All Nippon Airways, Cathay Pacific, Emirates, Etihad Airways, Singapore Airlines and Turkish Airlines, as well in international waters on cruise lines including Carnival, Celebrity Cruises, Princess Cruises, Norwegian Cruise Lines, P&O, Disney Cruise Line and Royal Caribbean International.

The channel broadcasts live sport from 40 international federations and competitions. These include Premier League, National Football League, National Basketball Association, UEFA Champions League, ATP World Tour, PGA Tour, European Tour, Euroleague, UEFA European Championship, Olympic Games and Ryder Cup.

Sport 24 launched in February 2012. A secondary part-time channel, Sport 24 Extra, launched in 2016, offering an extra 150 live hours a month and choice during concurrent events. Both channels originate from IMG's production headquarters at Stockley Park near Heathrow Airport. Sport 24 is available on Panasonic's live television service, which is broadcast via satellite to airlines.

== Joint ventures ==
IMG operates joint ventures with key partners across many areas of the business.

In Brazil, China, India, and Turkey IMM (Brazil, former IMX), CC-TV IMG (China), IMG Reliance (India) and IMG Dogus (Turkey) develop sports, fashion and entertainment properties in their respective territories.

In 2018, IMG and influencers Joe Sugg and Caspar Lee founded the joint venture Margravine Management, now known as MVE.

== See also ==
- IMG Academy
- Sports agent – a listing of well-known sports agents, categorized by sport
