= List of Ryder Cup matches =

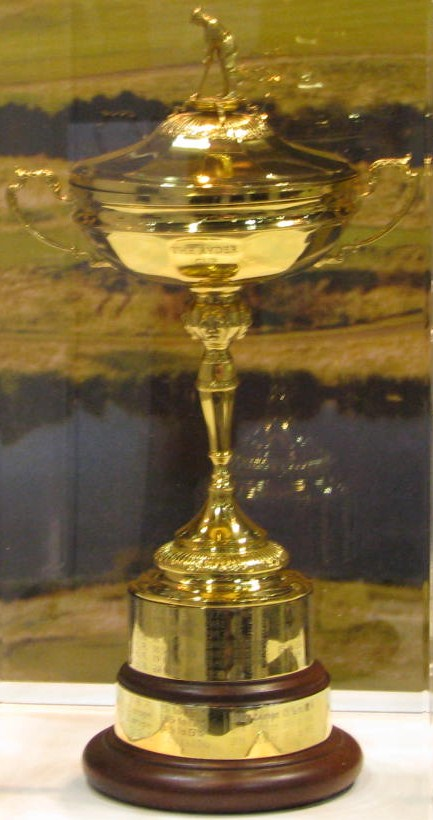

Tournament information
- Established: 1927
- Tours: PGA Tour, European Tour
- Format: Match play

Current champion
- (European Union) Europe (in 2025)

The Ryder Cup is a golf competition contested by teams from Europe and the United States. The competition was originally contested between Great Britain and the United States; players from the Channel Islands also appeared on the British team, Republic of Ireland golfers were added to the British team in 1953 (although the team name was only changed to 'Great Britain and Ireland' for the 1973 Ryder Cup) and this was extended to golfers elsewhere in Europe in 1979. Established in 1927, the competition is jointly administered by the Professional Golfers' Association of America (PGA of America) and Ryder Cup Europe, a venture in which the PGA European Tour is the primary partner. The competition takes place every two years, with the exception of 2001 when the match was played a year later due to the 11 September attacks and 2020 due to the COVID-19 pandemic; the venue alternates between courses in Europe and the United States. The winners of the first match were the United States, who defeated Great Britain at Worcester Country Club 9 1/2–2 1/2. The latest Ryder Cup, at Marco Simone Golf and Country Club in Rome, Italy, was won by the Europe 16 1/2–11 1/2 on 1 October 2023.

The Ryder Cup is contested in a match play format, which involves different methods of the format. A foursomes match is contested with two members from each team playing alternate shots. A fourball match consists of two players from either team, who each play their own shot throughout the round. The player that completes the hole in the lowest number of shots wins the hole. Singles matches are also played, with players from each team contesting a one-on-one match. The winner of each match scores a point for their team, if a match is tied after 18 holes then each team is awarded a 1/2 point. The format of the competition has changed throughout its history. Originally, foursome matches were played one day, with singles matches over 36 holes the next. Since 1979, the format has consisted of 28 matches held over three days, with each match worth a point. The first two days consist of eight matches; four foursomes and four fourball matches. The final day sees all 12 members of each team competing in singles matches.

The United States are the most successful team in the history of the competition; they have won 27 of the 43 matches that have been contested, 18 of which were before 1979, when the competition was contested between Great Britain and Ireland and the United States. In the 22 matches since the inclusion of European golfers, Europe has won twelve, the United States nine, with one match tied.

== History ==
The first Ryder Cup match was contested in June 1927. The competition held at Worcester Country Club was won 9 1/2–2 1/2 by the United States. British captain Ted Ray cited the Americans' "superior putting" as the reason for their victory. Great Britain improved for the 1929 competition, winning 7–5 at Moortown Golf Club. However, they were unable to replicate this performance in 1931. In 100-degree heat and missing a number of their best players, they were unable to match the Americans at the Scioto Country Club and lost 9–3. The 1933 contest at the Southport and Ainsdale Golf Club was a closer affair than previous matches. It came down to the final match between Syd Easterbrook and Denny Shute. The American Shute had a putt to win the competition, but missed two in succession leaving Easterbrook with a putt to win the contest, which he made to secure a 6 1/2–5 1/2 victory for the British team. The United States regained the Cup in 1935, when they beat Great Britain 9–3 at Ridgewood Country Club. They became the first team to win the competition outside of their own country in 1937 when they beat the British team 8–4 at Southport and Ainsdale Golf Club.

The advent of the Second World War meant the Ryder Cup was not contested again until 1947 at Portland Golf Club. The United States dominated the match in wet conditions, as Great Britain scored one point in an 11–1 defeat. The 1949 match was closer than the previous contest. Great Britain went into the final day with a 3–1 lead, but they were unable to secure the three and a half points they needed to win and lost 7–5. The 1951 contest at Pinehurst Resort, was again won by the United States. Such was the dominance in their 9 1/2–2 1/2 victory, that only two of the twelve matches reached the 18th hole. Before the 1953 contest Great Britain were given a boost when American Ben Hogan decided not to participate. He had won three of the four men's major golf championships during the year and his absence gave them optimism. However, they were unable to beat the United States; mistakes at the end of their singles matches by Peter Alliss and Bernard Hunt cost Great Britain as they lost 6 1/2–5 1/2. Despite recording their best points total in matches held in the United States, Great Britain were again defeated in 1955. The United States won 8–4 to extend their winning streak to 21 years.

The 1957 contest saw Great Britain regain the Cup for the first time since 1933. They were 3–1 down after the first round of matches, but victory in five out of the seven singles matches made the difference as they won 7 1/2–4 1/2. The United States regained the Ryder Cup in 1959 beating Great Britain 8 1/2–3 1/2. The match was the last to be contested over 36 holes of foursomes and singles matches. The format changed to two 18 hole sets of foursomes and singles in 1961, doubling the number of points available from 12 to 24. The change in format did not affect the trend of American dominance as they won 14 1/2–9 1/2 at Royal Lytham & St Annes Golf Club. Two sets of four balls were introduced in 1963, increasing the number of points available to 32. Again, the changes made little difference to the outcome as the United States won 23–9 at East Lake Golf Club. British player Henry Cotton summed up the display from the Americans, stating: "We have been outclassed." The 1965 match at Royal Birkdale Golf Club started well for Great Britain, as they were trailing the United States 9–7 going into the singles matches. But the Americans proved too strong, winning the majority of the matches to win the contest 19 1/2–12 1/2.

The 1967 match continued the trend of American victories, as the United States won 23 1/2–8 1/2 at Champions Golf Club. Unlike in previous years, the 1969 match was much closer. The match came down to the last hole of the final singles match between American Jack Nicklaus and British golfer Tony Jacklin. Nicklaus made his putt, which left Jacklin with a putt to tie the match. Despite this, Nicklaus conceded the putt, picking up Jacklin's ball marker. As a result, their match was tied, as was the contest at 16–16. The United States won again in 1971, beating Great Britain 18 1/2–13 1/2. The 1973 match was the first held in Scotland at Muirfield. The outcome remained the same as Great Britain lost 19–13. The 1975 match at Laurel Valley Golf Club was similar with the United States winning 21–11. The format changed again in 1977, as matches were reduced by more than a third leaving 20 points available. The changed requested by Great Britain & Ireland did little to change the outcome, as the United States won 12 1/2–7 1/2. Golfers from continental Europe were allowed to compete for the first time in 1979. There was another change to the format, the first two days now consisted of eight foursomes and fourballs, with twelve singles matches on the final day. Again, the changes had little effect on the outcome as the United States won 17–11.

The 1981 match was originally scheduled to take place at The Belfry, but construction of the course was not completed on time and Walton Heath Golf Club was used instead. The United States, containing a team that had won 36 major championships between them, dominated the match winning 18 1/2–9 1/2. The 1983 match at PGA National Golf Club was the closest in recent years. After the first two days the match was tied at 8–8. Europe fell short in the singles match, winning four out of the twelve matches and lost the contest 14 1/2–13 1/2. The 1985 match held at the now completed Belfry, saw Europe win the trophy for the first time in 28 years. Leading 9–7 going into the final day, they won six singles matches to secure a 16 1/2–11 1/2 victory. Europe retained the Ryder Cup in 1987, beating the United States 15–13 at Muirfield Village, to win in the United States for the first time. The 1989 match was only the second time the contest ended in a tie. Europe were in commanding position when José María Cañizares won his singles match, but defeat in the last four matches meant the match finished 14–14. The 1991 match at Kiawah Island Golf Resort, known as the "War on the Shore", saw the United States regain the Cup. The scores were tied at 8–8 going into the final day and the match came down to the last singles match between Europe's Bernhard Langer and American golfer Hale Irwin. Langer missed a 6 feet (1.8 m) putt at the last hole, which meant the United States won 14 1/2–13 1/2. The United States retained the Cup in 1993, winning 15–13 at The Belfry. Europe regained the trophy in 1995, defeating the United States 14 1/2–13 1/2 at Oak Hill Country Club.

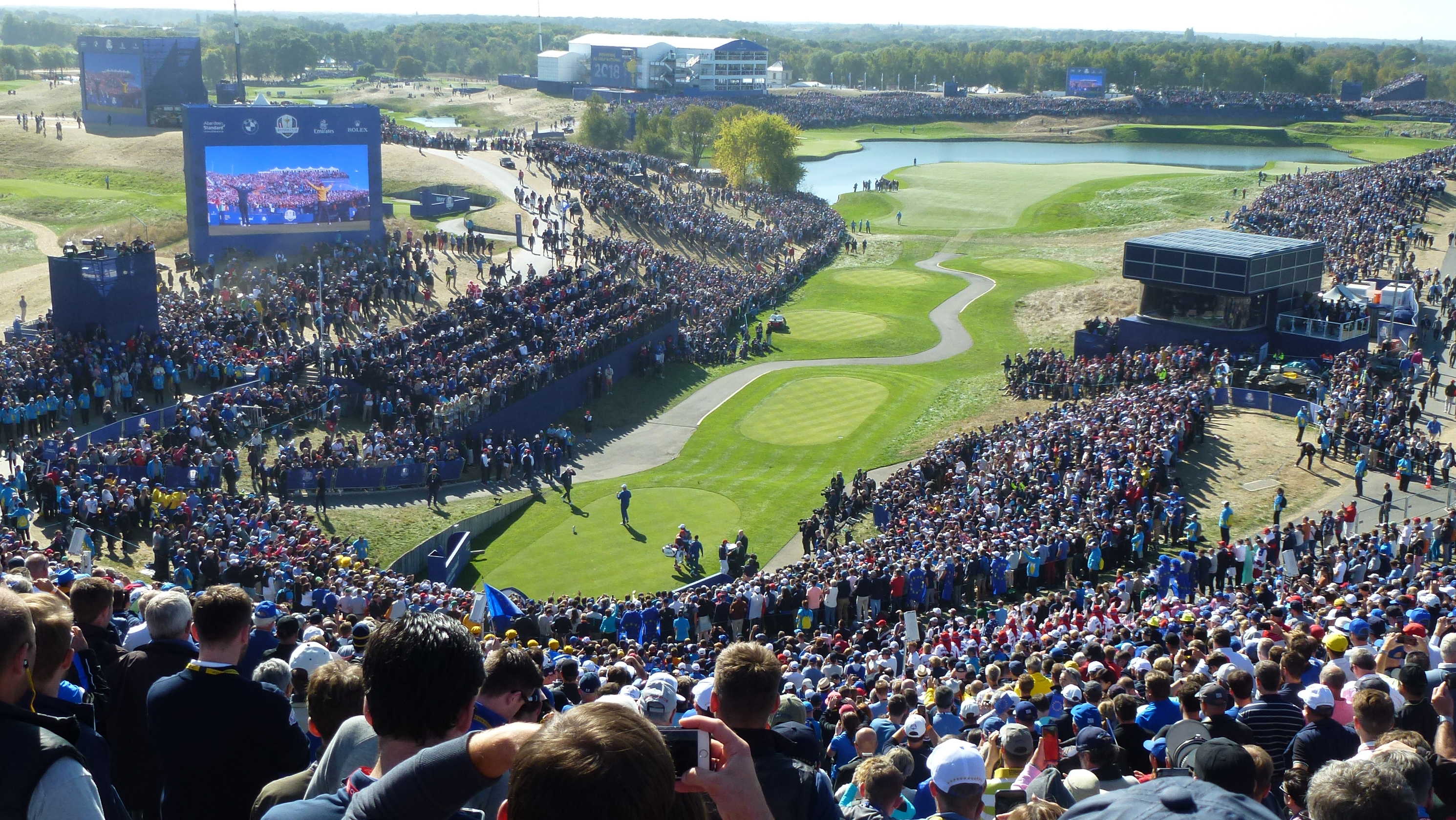
View from the Grandstand at the 2018 Ryder Cup held at Le Golf National in France.

The Ryder Cup was played outside of the British Isles for the first time in 1997, as Valderrama Golf Club in Spain hosted the contest. Despite taking a five-point lead into the final day, Europe needed the half point Colin Montgomerie secured in his tied singles match with Scott Hoch to win 14 1/2–13 1/2. The 1999 match was the third time in succession the contest had been won by a single point, but this time it was the United States who won 14 1/2–13 1/2. This was not without controversy, as Europe were unhappy with the celebrations by the American team after a putt by Justin Leonard, while European golfer José María Olazábal still had a chance of holing his putt. The Ryder Cup was scheduled to be played in 2001, but two weeks before the competition was scheduled to take place the September 11 attacks occurred. The United States fearing for their safety requested the match be played a year later in 2002. When the match was played, Europe won 15 1/2–12 1/2 to regain the Cup. They retained the Cup in 2004 when they won 18 1/2–9 1/2 at Oakland Hills Country Club, in what was the United States' heaviest defeat in the competition. The result was repeated in 2006 at the K Club. Europe's 18 1/2–9 1/2 victory marked the first time they had won three matches in succession. The United States regained the Ryder Cup in 2008, winning for the first time since 1999. They won the match when Jim Furyk beat Miguel Ángel Jiménez with four singles matches still ongoing, to win 16 1/2–11 1/2. A tight contest in 2010 came down to the final singles match between European Graeme McDowell and American golfer Hunter Mahan. McDowell won his match with a hole to spare, to give Europe a 14 1/2–13 1/2 victory. Europe recovered a 10–6 deficit on the last day in 2012, as they won eight of the twelve singles matches to win 14 1/2–13 1/2.

The 2014 event held at Gleneagles Hotel on the PGA Centenary Course, resulted in a third successive victory for Europe. The 16 1/2–11 1/2 scoreline was their biggest since their 2008 success. The 2016 edition saw USA win 17–11 to secure their first victory since 2008. Europe regained the Ryder Cup in 2018 when they won 17 1/2–10 1/2 at Le Golf National in France.

== Matches ==
Key
†	Match was tied

- The "Year" column refers to the year the match was held, and links to the article about that match.

Ryder Cup matches
Year	Winners	Score	Runners-up	Host country	Venue	GBI/Europe captain	United States captain
1927	United States	9 1/2–2 1/2	Great Britain	United States	Worcester Country Club, Massachusetts	(Jersey) Ted Ray	Walter Hagen
1929	Great Britain	7–5	United States	England	Moortown Golf Club, Yorkshire	(Scotland) George Duncan	Walter Hagen
1931	United States	9–3	Great Britain	United States	Scioto Country Club, Columbus, Ohio	(England) Charles Whitcombe	Walter Hagen
1933	Great Britain	6 1/2–5 1/2	United States	England	Southport and Ainsdale Golf Club, Lancashire	(England) John Henry Taylor	Walter Hagen
1935	United States	9–3	Great Britain	United States	Ridgewood Country Club, Paramus, New Jersey	(England) Charles Whitcombe	Walter Hagen
1937	United States	8–4	Great Britain	England	Southport and Ainsdale Golf Club, Lancashire	(England) Charles Whitcombe	Walter Hagen
1947	United States	11–1	Great Britain	United States	Portland Golf Club, Portland, Oregon	(England) Henry Cotton	Ben Hogan
1949	United States	7–5	Great Britain	England	Ganton Golf Club, Scarborough, Yorkshire	(England) Charles Whitcombe	Ben Hogan
1951	United States	9 1/2–2 1/2	Great Britain	United States	Pinehurst Resort Course No. 2, North Carolina	(England) Arthur Lacey	Sam Snead
1953	United States	6 1/2–5 1/2	Great Britain	England	Wentworth Club, Virginia Water, Surrey	(England) Henry Cotton	Lloyd Mangrum
1955	United States	8–4	Great Britain	United States	Thunderbird Country Club, Rancho Mirage, California	(Wales) Dai Rees	Chick Harbert
1957	Great Britain	7 1/2–4 1/2	United States	England	Lindrick Golf Club, West Riding of Yorkshire	(Wales) Dai Rees	Jack Burke Jr.
1959	United States	8 1/2–3 1/2	Great Britain	United States	Eldorado Golf Club, Indian Wells, California	(Wales) Dai Rees	Sam Snead
1961	United States	14 1/2–9 1/2	Great Britain	England	Royal Lytham & St Annes Golf Club, Lytham St. Annes, Lancashire	(Wales) Dai Rees	Jerry Barber
1963	United States	23–9	Great Britain	United States	Atlanta Athletic Club, Atlanta, Georgia (Note: The Atlanta Athletic Club sold the site of the golf course in 1967 when they moved to the Atlanta suburb of Johns Creek, Georgia. The event was held on the original course, now known as East Lake Golf Club.)	(Scotland) John Fallon	Arnold Palmer
1965	United States	19 1/2–12 1/2	Great Britain	England	Royal Birkdale Golf Club, Southport, Lancashire	(England) Harry Weetman	Byron Nelson
1967	United States	23 1/2–8 1/2	Great Britain	United States	Champions Golf Club, Houston, Texas	(Wales) Dai Rees	Ben Hogan
1969	United States (Note: In the event of a match ending in a tie, the team who last won the Ryder Cup retains the Cup.)	16–16^{†}	Great Britain	England	Royal Birkdale Golf Club, Southport, Lancashire	(Scotland) Eric Brown	Sam Snead
1971	United States	18 1/2–13 1/2	Great Britain	United States	Old Warson Country Club, St. Louis, Missouri	(Scotland) Eric Brown	Jay Hebert
1973	United States	19–13	(United Kingdom) (Republic of Ireland) Great Britain & Ireland	Scotland	Muirfield, Gullane, East Lothian	(England) Bernard Hunt	Jack Burke Jr.
1975	United States	21–11	(United Kingdom) (Republic of Ireland) Great Britain & Ireland	United States	Laurel Valley Golf Club, Ligonier, Pennsylvania	(England) Bernard Hunt	Arnold Palmer
1977	United States	12 1/2–7 1/2	(United Kingdom) (Republic of Ireland) Great Britain & Ireland	England	Royal Lytham & St Annes Golf Club, Lytham St. Annes, Lancashire	(Wales) Brian Huggett	Dow Finsterwald
1979	United States	17–11	Europe	United States	The Greenbrier, The Greenbrier Course, White Sulphur Springs, West Virginia	(England) John Jacobs	Billy Casper
1981	United States	18 1/2–9 1/2	Europe	England	Walton Heath Golf Club, Walton-on-the-Hill, Surrey	(England) John Jacobs	Dave Marr
1983	United States	14 1/2–13 1/2	Europe	United States	PGA National Golf Club, Palm Beach Gardens, Florida	(England) Tony Jacklin	Jack Nicklaus
1985	Europe	16 1/2–11 1/2	United States	England	The Belfry, Brabazon Course, Wishaw, Warwickshire	(England) Tony Jacklin	Lee Trevino
1987	Europe	15–13	United States	United States	Muirfield Village, Dublin, Ohio	(England) Tony Jacklin	Jack Nicklaus
1989	Europe	14–14^{†}	United States	England	The Belfry, Brabazon Course, Wishaw, Warwickshire	(England) Tony Jacklin	Raymond Floyd
1991	United States	14 1/2–13 1/2	Europe	United States	Kiawah Island Golf Resort, Ocean Course, Kiawah Island, South Carolina	(Scotland) Bernard Gallacher	Dave Stockton
1993	United States	15–13	Europe	England	The Belfry, Brabazon Course, Wishaw, Warwickshire	(Scotland) Bernard Gallacher	Tom Watson
1995	Europe	14 1/2–13 1/2	United States	United States	Oak Hill Country Club, East Course, Rochester, New York	(Scotland) Bernard Gallacher	Lanny Wadkins
1997	Europe	14 1/2–13 1/2	United States	Spain	Valderrama Golf Club, Sotogrande, Andalusia	(Spain) Seve Ballesteros	Tom Kite
1999	United States	14 1/2–13 1/2	Europe	United States	The Country Club, Composite Course, Brookline, Massachusetts	(England) Mark James	Ben Crenshaw
2002	Europe	15 1/2–12 1/2	United States	England	The Belfry, Brabazon Course, Wishaw, Warwickshire	(Scotland) Sam Torrance	Curtis Strange
2004	Europe	18 1/2–9 1/2	United States	United States	Oakland Hills Country Club, South Course, Bloomfield Hills, Michigan	(Germany) Bernhard Langer	Hal Sutton
2006	Europe	18 1/2–9 1/2	United States	Republic of Ireland	K Club, Palmer Course, Straffan, County Kildare	(Wales) Ian Woosnam	Tom Lehman
2008	United States	16 1/2–11 1/2	Europe	United States	Valhalla Golf Club, Louisville, Kentucky	(England) Nick Faldo	Paul Azinger
2010	Europe	14 1/2–13 1/2	United States	Wales	Celtic Manor Resort, Twenty Ten Course, Newport	(Scotland) Colin Montgomerie	Corey Pavin
2012	Europe	14 1/2–13 1/2	United States	United States	Medinah Country Club, Course 3, Medinah, Illinois	(Spain) José María Olazábal	Davis Love III
2014	Europe	16 1/2–11 1/2	United States	Scotland	Gleneagles, PGA Centenary Course, Perth & Kinross	(Republic of Ireland) Paul McGinley	Tom Watson
2016	United States	17–11	Europe	United States	Hazeltine National Golf Club, Chaska, Minnesota	(Northern Ireland) Darren Clarke	Davis Love III
2018	Europe	17 1/2–10 1/2	United States	France	Le Golf National, Albatros Course, Saint-Quentin-en-Yvelines	(Denmark) Thomas Bjørn	Jim Furyk
2021	United States	19–9	Europe	United States	Whistling Straits, Straits Course, Haven, Wisconsin	(Republic of Ireland) Pádraig Harrington	Steve Stricker
2023	Europe	16 1/2–11 1/2	United States	Italy	Marco Simone Golf and Country Club, Rome	(England) Luke Donald	Zach Johnson
2025	Europe	15–13	United States	United States	Bethpage Black Course, Farmingdale, New York	(England) Luke Donald	Keegan Bradley
2027				Republic of Ireland	Adare Manor, Adare, County Limerick, Ireland	(England) Luke Donald	

== Results by team ==
Team	From	To	Matches	Wins	Losses	Retained	Lost Ties
United States	1927	2025	45	27	16	1	1
Great Britain/ Great Britain & Ireland	1927	1977	22	3	18	0	1
Europe	1979	2025	23	13	9	1	0

== Venues ==
Maps of Ryder Cup venues.

Ryder Cups held in Great Britain and Ireland
Ryder Cups held in the USA
Ryder Cups held on the European mainland
