= James Connolly (stonemason) =

James Connolly, or Conolly, was an Irish stonemason, from Adare, County Limerick. He is best known for his work on Adare Manor in the 19th century.

He supervised the construction of the building over a 21-year period. An inscription on the east front of Adare Manor commemorates 'James Conolly of Adare, mason, faithful friend and servant of the Earl of Dunraven, from AD 1831 till his death in 1852'.

There is also a tribute to James Connolly, by the 3rd Earl of Dunraven, in the book "Memorials of Adare manor."

...it may be remarked as an interesting fact, and one as rare as it is curious, that the greater portion of the building, and that the boldest in conception and most picturesque in effect, was designed by an amateur, not a single drawing having been furnished by an architect; and a still larger portion was erected without the employment of either builder or clerk of the works; everything was carried on for twenty-one years solely under the superintendence of that remarkable man who was picked out from among the masons by the sagacious eye of his employer: and well did he justify the confidence reposed in him; not a single mistake having been made, nor a crack or settlement having occurred in the work which he executed. His name is chronicled on the walls of the noble house he built, but none, save those who knew him well, can be aware of what rare qualities he was possessed; how strong an intellect, what refined natural taste, how pure a heart, and what thorough truthfulness of character were combined with a steadiness, a thoughtfulness, and an unflagging zeal for the undertaking to which he devoted his life. Requiescat in pace. May his memory long be honoured, as assuredly it ought, by the possessors of Adare!
