= 2027 Ryder Cup =

Golf tournament in Ireland

46th Ryder Cup Matches
- Dates: 17–19 September 2027
- Venue: The Golf Course at Adare Manor
- Location: Adare, County Limerick, Ireland
- Captains: Luke Donald (Europe); Jim Furyk (USA)
(Europe)	0	0	(United States)

The 46th Ryder Cup Matches will be held at Adare Manor, a golf course in County Limerick, Ireland, on 17–19 September 2027. It will be the first Ryder Cup held in Ireland since 2006. The Irish government is expected to spend €58 million on the event, with €22.5 million of that cost going to an event licence fee from the European Tour.

== Teams ==
=== Captains ===
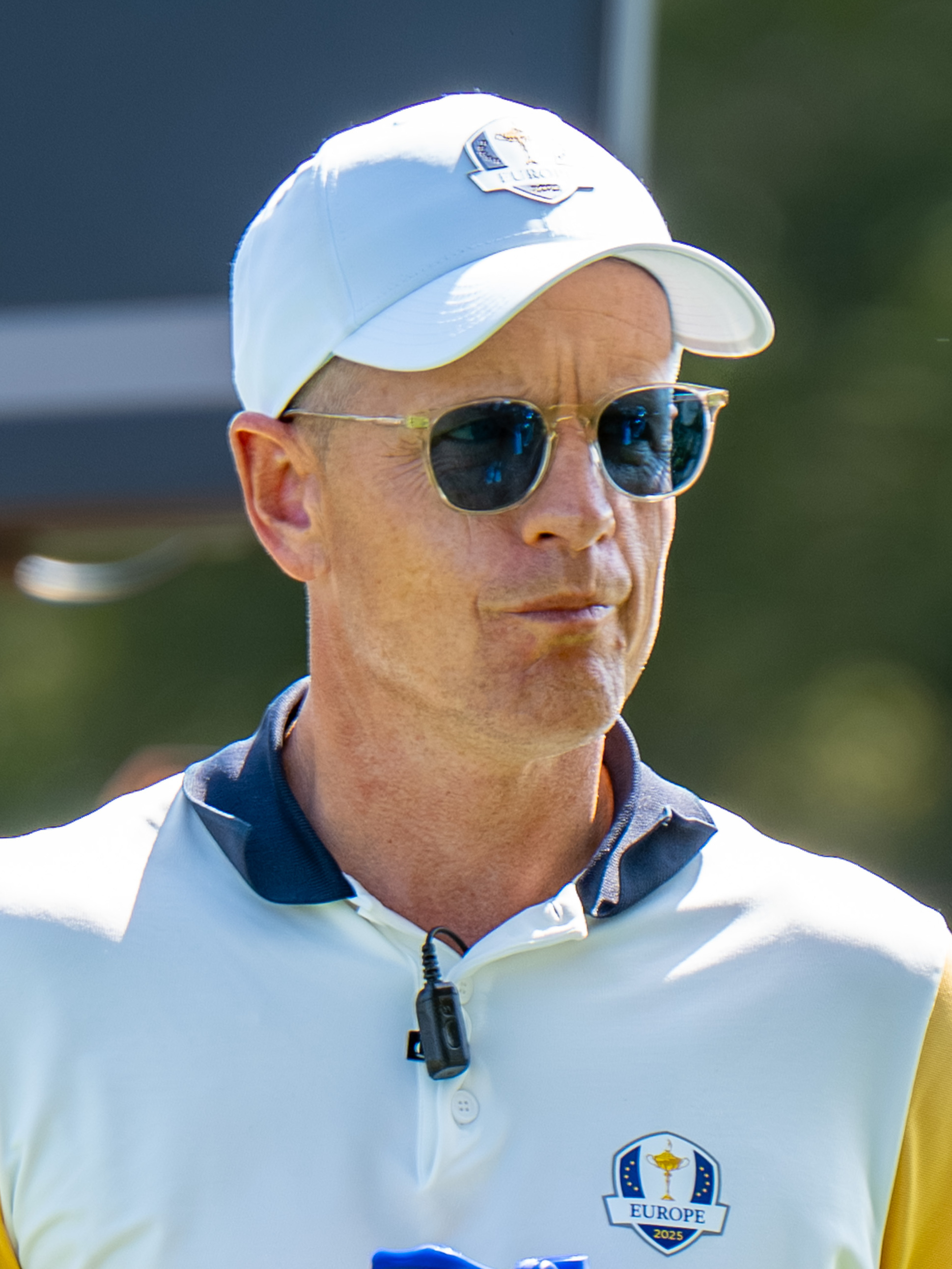
Team Europe captain Luke Donald

Luke Donald was named as the European team captain on 4 March 2026, retaining the role from Europe's victorious 2023 and 2025 campaigns. He became the first European to be named captain three Cups in a row since Bernard Gallacher between 1991 and 1995.

Jim Furyk was named as the USA captain on 24 April 2026, for a second time after his captaincy in 2018.

=== Vice captains ===
For the European team, Edoardo Molinari and Francesco Molinari were selected as vice captains, rejoining Donald from the last two editions of the Ryder Cup. Pádraig Harrington was named as the third vice captain

For the U.S. team, Stewart Cink and Justin Leonard were selected as vice captains.

== Transport ==
The Western Rail Corridor, Limerick to Foynes and Clonmel to Thurles railway lines must reopen on time for the event to reduce road traffic.
