= Adare Manor =

Manor house and hotel in County Limerick, Ireland

Coordinates: 52.5639°N 8.7786°W

- Aerial photograph of the manor house, formal gardens and golf course.

- Location within Ireland Location within Europe

General information
- Architectural style: Tudor Revival
- Location: Adare, County Limerick, Ireland
- Construction started: c. 1700 (original structure); 1832 (current structure)
- Completed: 1862; 164 years ago
- Renovated: 1988/89; 2016/2017
- Client: Windham Henry Quin
- Owner: J. P. McManus

Design and construction
- Architects: James Pain and George Richard Pain, Lewis Nockalls Cottingham, Augustus Pugin, Philip Charles Hardwick
- Awards: Three MICHELIN Keys, Forbes 5 Star, One MICHELIN Star

Website
- www.adaremanor.com

Adare Manor is a manor house located on the banks of the River Maigue in the village of Adare, County Limerick, Ireland, the former seat of the Earl of Dunraven and Mount-Earl. The present house was built in the early 19th century, though retaining some of the walls of the 17th-century structure. It is now one of Europe’s great sporting and country estates. A luxury Forbes 5 Star hotel, the property boasts Three MICHELIN Keys, a MICHELIN-starred restaurant, and will be the host of the centenery 2027 Ryder Cup in September 2027.

== History ==
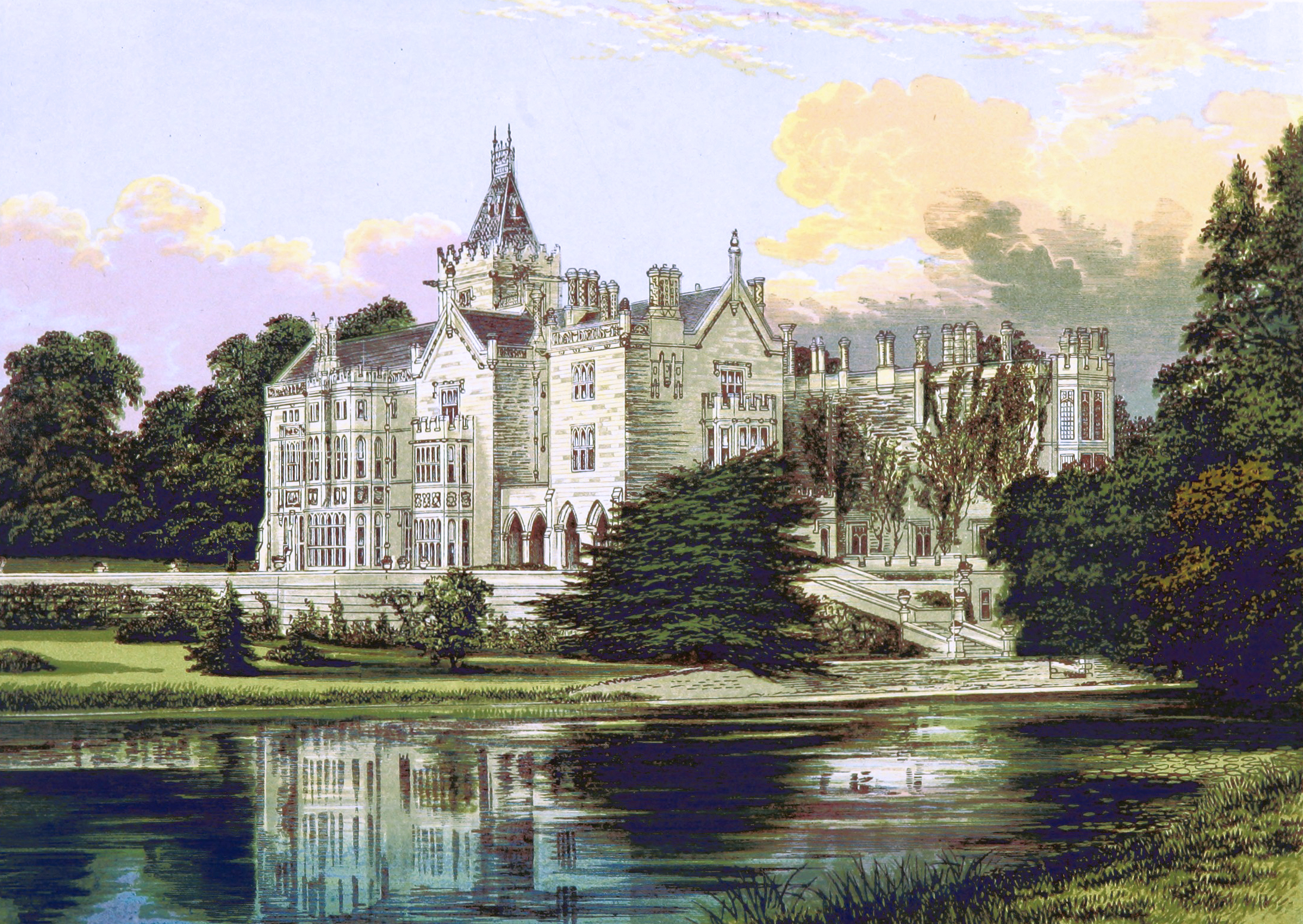
Painting of Adare Manor, 1879

The first mention of a manor on the land is following the Norman invasion of Ireland. In 1226, King Henry III gave a grant to Justiciary of Ireland Geoffroi de Morreis (de Marisco) to hold an eight-day annual fair following the Feast of St. James at his Manor of Adare.

The lands subsequently were granted to the Earls of Kildare, members of the Welsh-Norman FitzGerald family who came to Ireland in 1169. In 1536, the act of attainder was passed against Thomas FitzGerald, 10th Earl of Kildare, whose lands, castles and manors were forfeited to the crown.

In a letter dated 24 March 1547, the boy king Edward VI granted the Earls of Desmond "the manors and dominions of Croom and Adare, in the county of Limerick, to hold for life." The grant was short lived; the Desmond Rebellions brought control of the lands to the St. Leger family. For the next century, the lands passed from 10 families: St. Leger, Zouch, Gold, Rigges, Wallop, Norreis (Norris), Jephson, Evans, Ormesby (Ormsby), and then Quin.

Thady Quin, Esq. (1645–1726) of Gortfadda, County Leitrim, purchased the moiety in 1669 and continued to add surrounding land through 1702. He received the last land grant for Adare, on 16 December 1684, to hold the lands for a thousand years, "paying to Gilbert Ormsby and his heirs the rent of £230." The earliest section of the first manor house was presumably a square or oblong tower, likely erected by Thady Quin at the end of the 17th century.

The deed of conveyance, dated 23 February 1721, transferred the following land to Thady's eldest son, Valentine Quin:

The estate of Adare extended northwards nearly to the Shannon, and comprehended a considerable portion of the parishes of Kildimo and Chapelrussell, and the north-western section of Adare situate in the barony of Coshma, with a portion of Drehidtarsna, and parts of Kilkeedy and Croom, lying in the barony of Pubblebrien. The Manor of Tobernea was situate in the south-eastern part of the county, embracing the extreme southern portion of the barony of Coshma, with the adjacent part of Coshlea, and contained a considerable part of the parishes of Effin, Ballingarry, and Kilbreedy Minor

— Caroline Wyndham-Quin, Countess of Dunraven, Memorials of Adare Manor, 1865

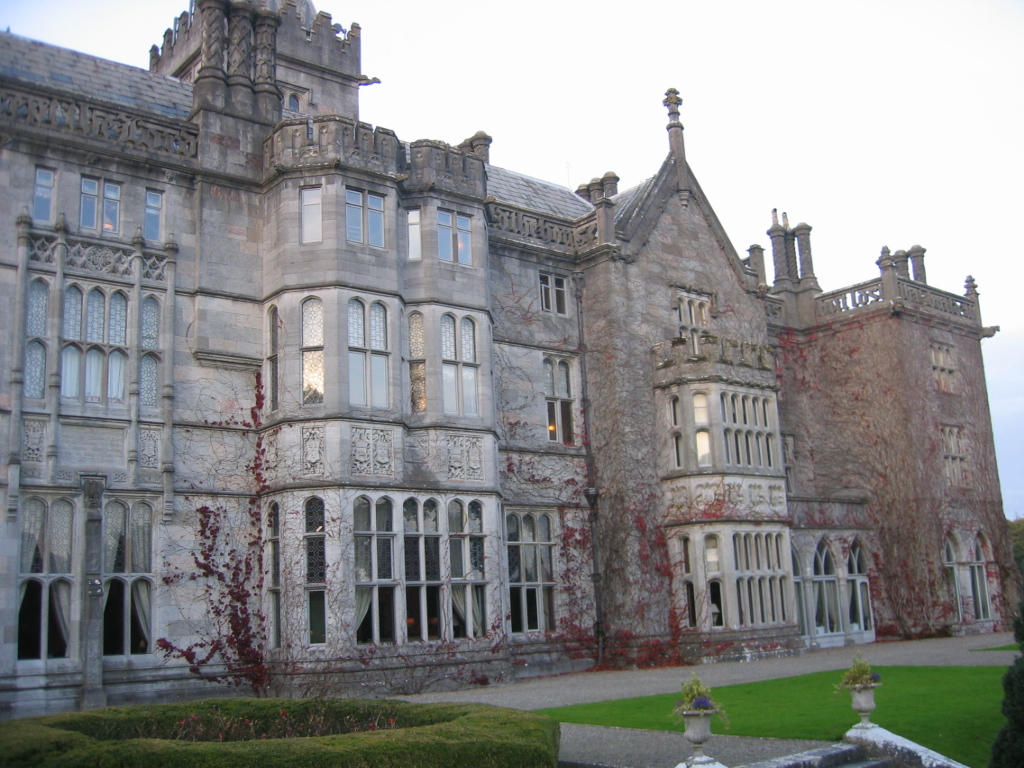
Adare Manor, 2008

Valentine Quin was the grandfather of Valentine Richard Quin (1752–1824), the first Earl of Dunraven. Valentine Richard Quin, MP for Kilmallock (1799–1800), was created a Baronet of Great Britain in 1781 and was raised to the peerage in 1800 as Baron Adare. He was advanced to a Viscountcy in 1816 as Viscount Mount Earl and became Viscount Adare and the first Earl of Dunraven and Mount-Earl on 5 February 1822. He chose the title of Dunraven in honour of his daughter-in-law Caroline Wyndham, daughter and heiress of Thomas Wyndham of Dunraven Castle, who in 1810 had married his eldest son and heir, Windham Henry Quin.

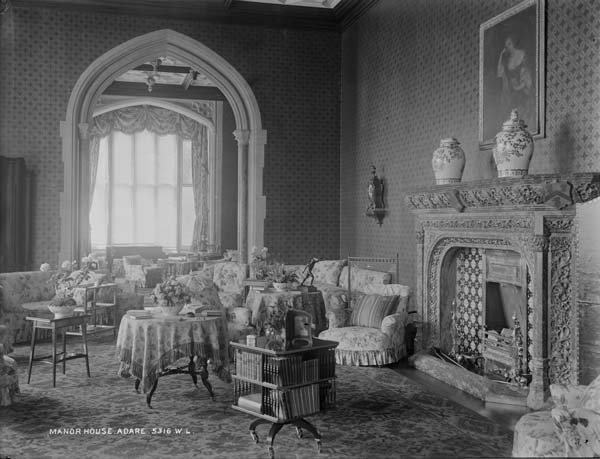
Interior, c.1880-1914

Around 1785, the first Earl of Dunraven made significant alterations to Adare Manor, raising more walls and changing the entrance from the south front to the northwest side. In 1786, it was described as "a very noble structure with fine and extensive demesnes".

Valentine Richard Quin's earldom lasted only two years; upon his death to 1824 the title passed to Windham Henry Quin, the second Earl of Dunraven and Mount-Earl. The new Earl, who was suffering from gout and confined indoors, rebuilt his home, turning it from a classic Georgian mansion into a large Tudor Revival manor. Building the new manor involved the rebuilding, enlarging and subsequent demolition of the earlier 18th-century manor house of the Quin family. Begun in 1832, construction provided work for the people from the surrounding villagers during the Great Famine.

Some of the old walls of the manor were preserved and encased in the new work, including the north and south walls of the dining room, and the walls between the hall and gallery. When the walls of the old tower were broken to form the door between the hall and gallery, a silver coin "of considerable antiquity" was discovered. The construction was still unfinished by the death of the second earl in 1850, after which the family consulted architect Philip Charles Hardwick, who "with much talent and judgment completed the south and west fronts, after his own designs, following the general plan as intended by the late Earl," his widow wrote.

The 3rd Earl of Dunraven wrote the following words of high praise towards the Irish stonemason, James Connolly, who made significant architectural contributions: "the greater portion of the building, and that the boldest in conception and most picturesque in effect, was designed by an amateur, not a single drawing having been furnished by an architect; and a still larger portion was erected without the employment of either builder or clerk of the works; everything was carried on for twenty-one years solely under the superintendence of that remarkable man..."

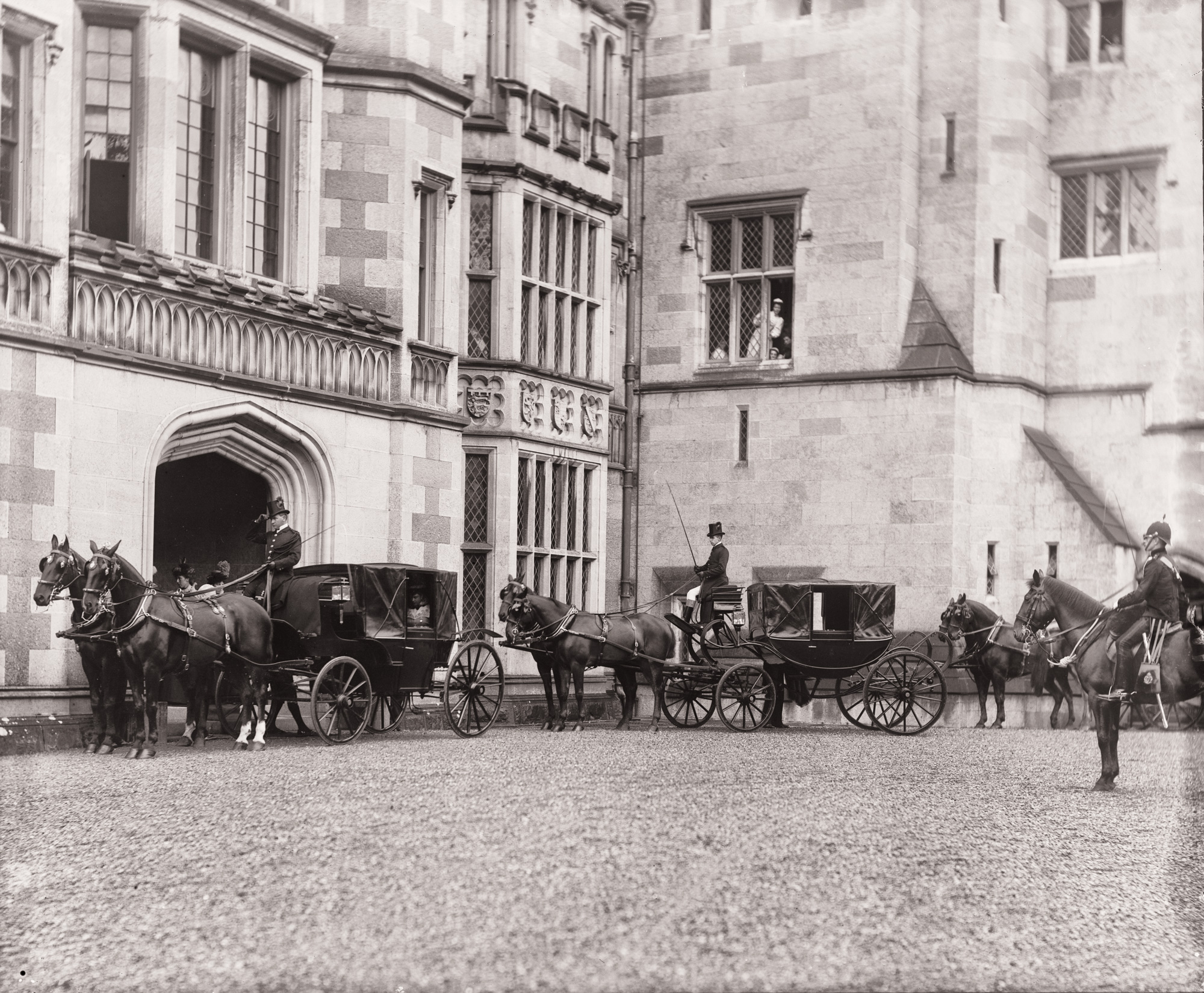
Departure of the royal party, 1 September 1897

Although Lady Caroline claimed that Adare Manor was planned entirely by her husband at first, the initial architectural plans for the house were made by James and George Richard Pain. The client dispensed with their services, however, around 1838, and Lord Dunraven continued with the design of the house himself with help from English architect Lewis Nockalls Cottingham. The initial phase of construction was completed under master mason, James Connolly, together with the second Earl of Dunraven and his wife, who incorporated their favourite buildings into the design.

Augustus Pugin was hired in 1846 to design some of the interior features including the great hall. The three-storey southern range and the tower with pyramidal roof, completed by the third Earl of Dunraven between 1850 and 1862, were built to the designs of Philip Charles Hardwick.

An inscription on the east front of Adare Manor commemorates "James Conolly of Adare, mason, faithful friend and servant of the Earl of Dunraven, from AD 1831 till his death in 1852".

The new manor was built of large blocks of grey, red and brown limestone. On the parapet of the south front, a verse from Psalms 127:1 is etched in old English characters: "Except the Lord build the house: their labour is but lost that build it." Further verses "Love God onely," "Honour and obey the Queen," and "Eschew evil and do good" are carved onto the colonnade.

At the time of Griffith's Valuation in 1868, the property was valued at only £130 (equivalent to £12,710 in 2025); in 1906 the buildings at Adare Manor were valued at just £182 (equivalent to £19,133 in 2025).

=== Subsequent sales ===
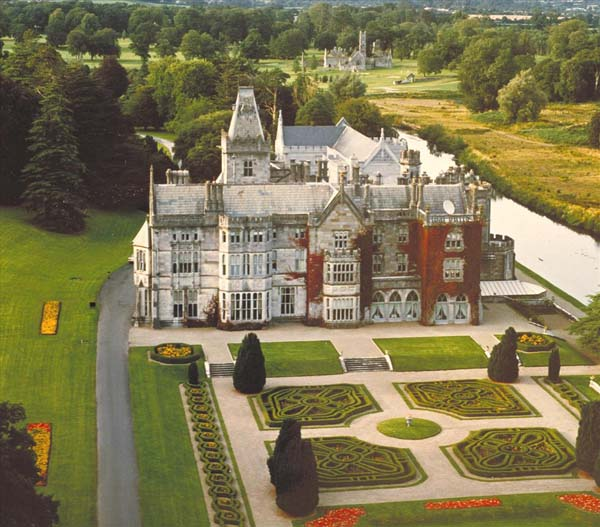
Adare Manor Aerial

Thady Wyndham-Quin, 7th Earl of Dunraven and Mount-Earl (1939–2011), who was crippled by polio while a schoolboy, lived with his family in a nearby house called Kilgobbin House. Unable to bear the expense of maintaining Adare Manor, he sold it and its contents in 1982 to an investment consortium. In 1987, the house was purchased by Irish American Thomas Kane from Florida. It was then renovated and converted to become the Adare Manor Hotel and Golf Resort. In 2012 the National Asset Management Agency (NAMA) took effective control of Adare Manor and consolidated the hotel, golf, land and various Lodge & Villa owners and lenders into a single group to protect the assets and prepare it for sale. Ultimately after a protracted sales process this resulted in Adare Manor being bought by Limerick businessman J. P. McManus for an estimated €30 million in 2015. On 28 and 29 January 2016 many of the hotel contents were sold at a public auction.

== Design ==
The building is a calendar house, featuring 365 windows and 52 chimneys, among some other design characteristics. Along the top of the building an extract of psalm 127:1 is made from carved stone: "Except the Lord build the house, then labour is but lost that built it".

== Adare Manor hotel ==
The Oak Room at Adare Manor
- Interactive map of The Oak Room at Adare Manor

Restaurant information
- Established: November 2017
- Head chef: Michael Tweedie
- Food type: Irish cuisine
- Rating: Michelin Guide
- Website: www.adaremanor.com/dining/the-oak-room/

Adare Manor is one of Europe’s great sporting and country estates, set on 842 acres along the River Maigue in County Limerick, Ireland. Once the family seat of the Earls of Dunraven, the 19th-century neo-Gothic Manor House is now a Forbes Five-Star resort holding Three MICHELIN Keys, and will host the 2027 Ryder Cup, 13–19 September 2027.

The estate is made for staying several nights. Guests shape their own days: falconry, archery, gun dog experiences and fishing on the estate, riding and shooting nearby, woodland walks and formal gardens, and the Tom Fazio-designed championship golf course.

Dining is led by The Oak Room, which holds one MICHELIN Star, alongside Ōku, The Carriage House, Afternoon Tea in The Gallery, The Tack Room whiskey bar and private wine tastings in the cellar.

The Spa offers treatments by 111SKIN, with a relaxation pool and infared sauna. The Padel Club activity centre boasts a 17-metre pool, indoor padel courts, a simulation room with Trackman golf, and pilates and yoga studio.

The 103 bedrooms and suites combine original art, Georgian-style furnishings and marble bathrooms with anticipatory service.

Adare Manor sits at the edge of Adare village, with its thatched cottages, boutiques and pubs, about 25 minutes from Shannon Airport, and is a natural base for the west of Ireland.

=== Golf ===
The Golf Course at Adare Manor
- Interactive map of The Golf Course at Adare Manor

Club information
- Established: 1995
- Tournaments: Irish Open (2007, 2008), Ryder Cup (2027)
- Designed by: Robert Trent Jones; redesigned by Tom Fazio
- Par: 72
- Length: 7,509 yards (6,866 m)
- Course rating: 75.6
- Slope rating: 137

The Golf Course at Adare Manor (formerly Adare Golf Club (Note: Adare Manor Golf Club, which was established in 1900, is not part of the Adare Manor resort complex.)) is an 18-hole championship golf course. Designed by Robert Trent Jones, it was added to the resort in 1995. Following the purchase of the resort by J. P. McManus in 2015, it underwent a redesign by Tom Fazio.

Adare Manor was the venue for the Irish Open in 2007 and 2008. It also played host to the J. P. McManus Pro-Am in 2005, 2010 and 2022.

In July 2019 Adare Manor was announced as the host of the 2026 Ryder Cup; with the event being postponed in 2020 due to the COVID-19 pandemic subsequent matches were pushed back a year, with Adare Manor now hosting in 2027.

== In popular culture ==
Adare Manor and its grounds were used for the 1977 comedy film The Last Remake of Beau Geste, starring Marty Feldman, Ann-Margret, and Michael York.

In 2010, Adare Manor served as the judge's house for Sharon Osbourne and Louis Walsh on The X Factor.

== Gallery ==

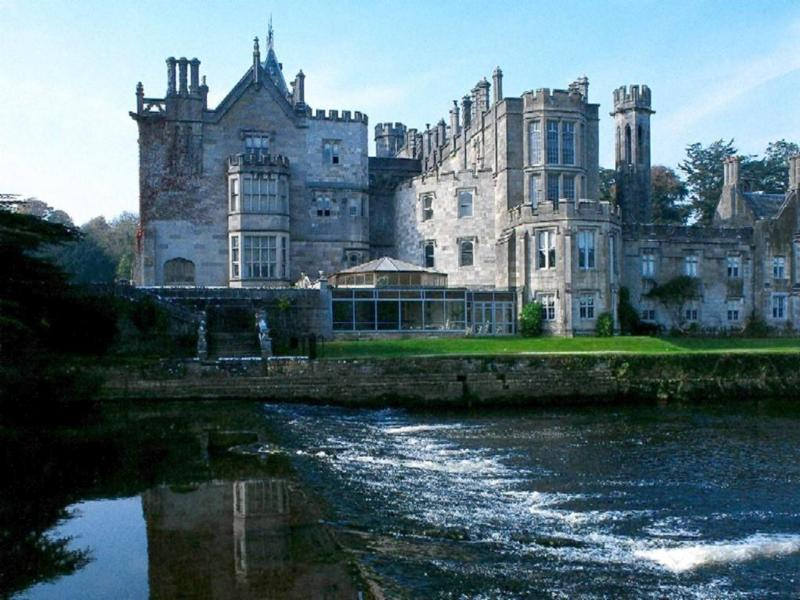

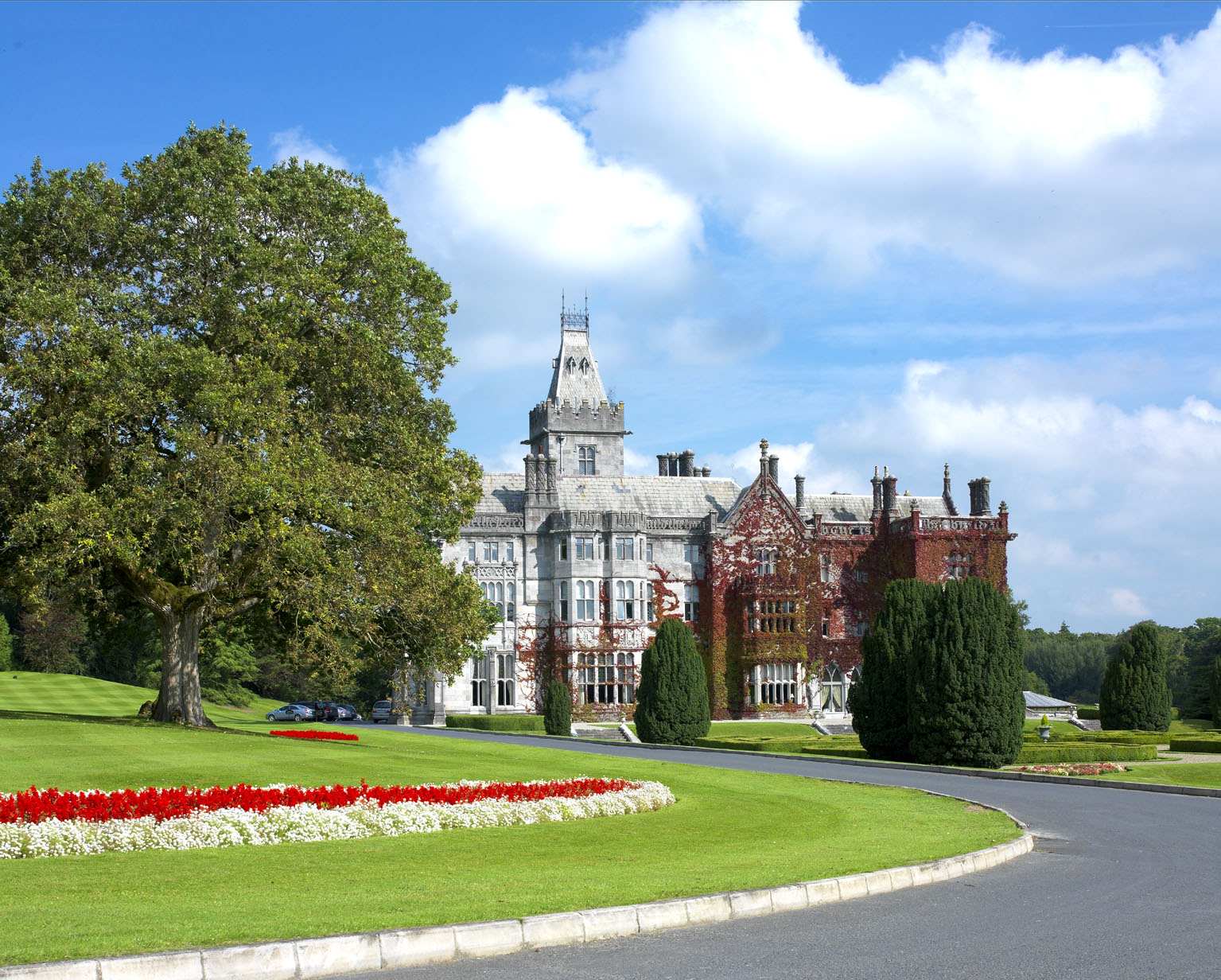

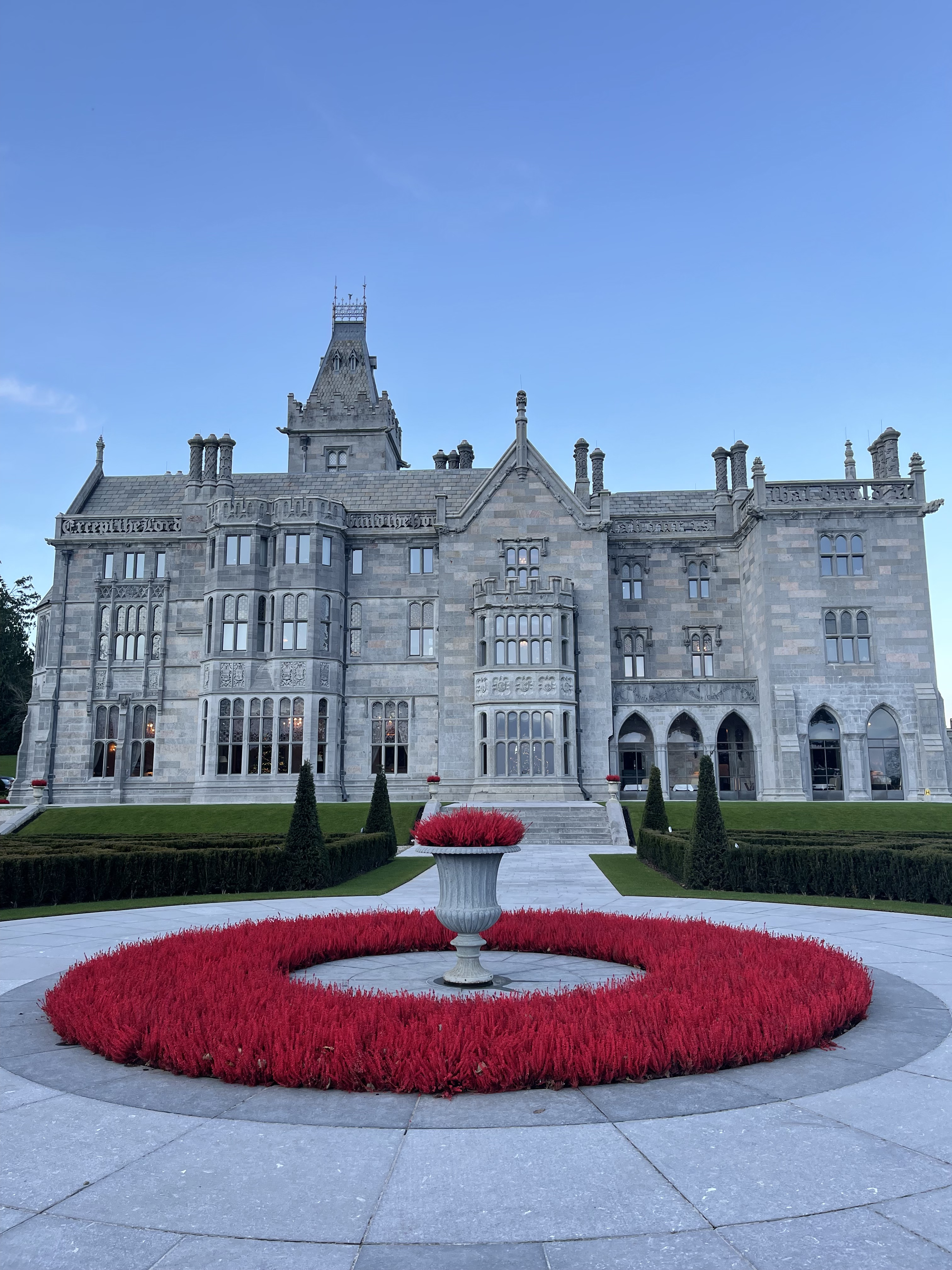

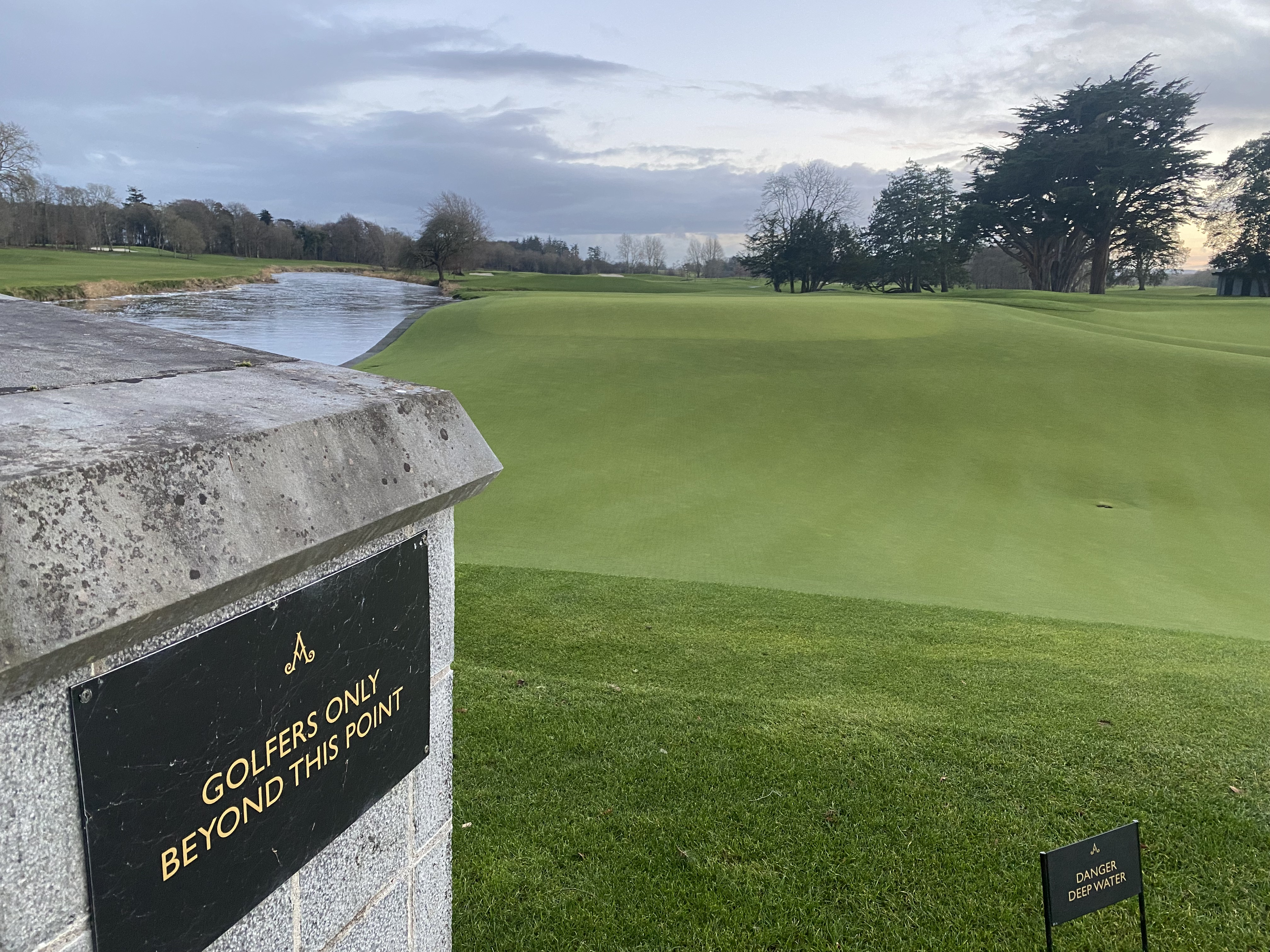

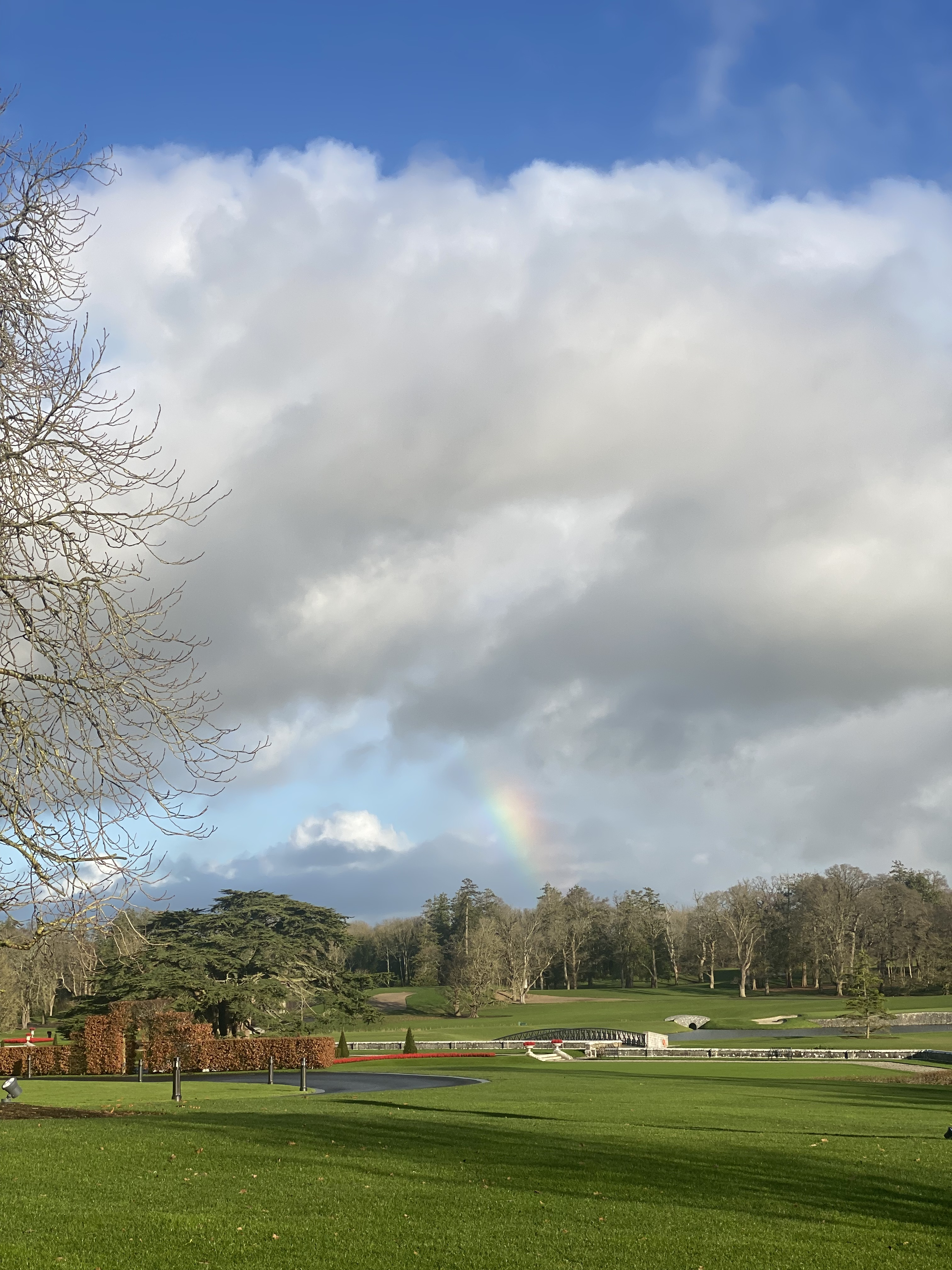

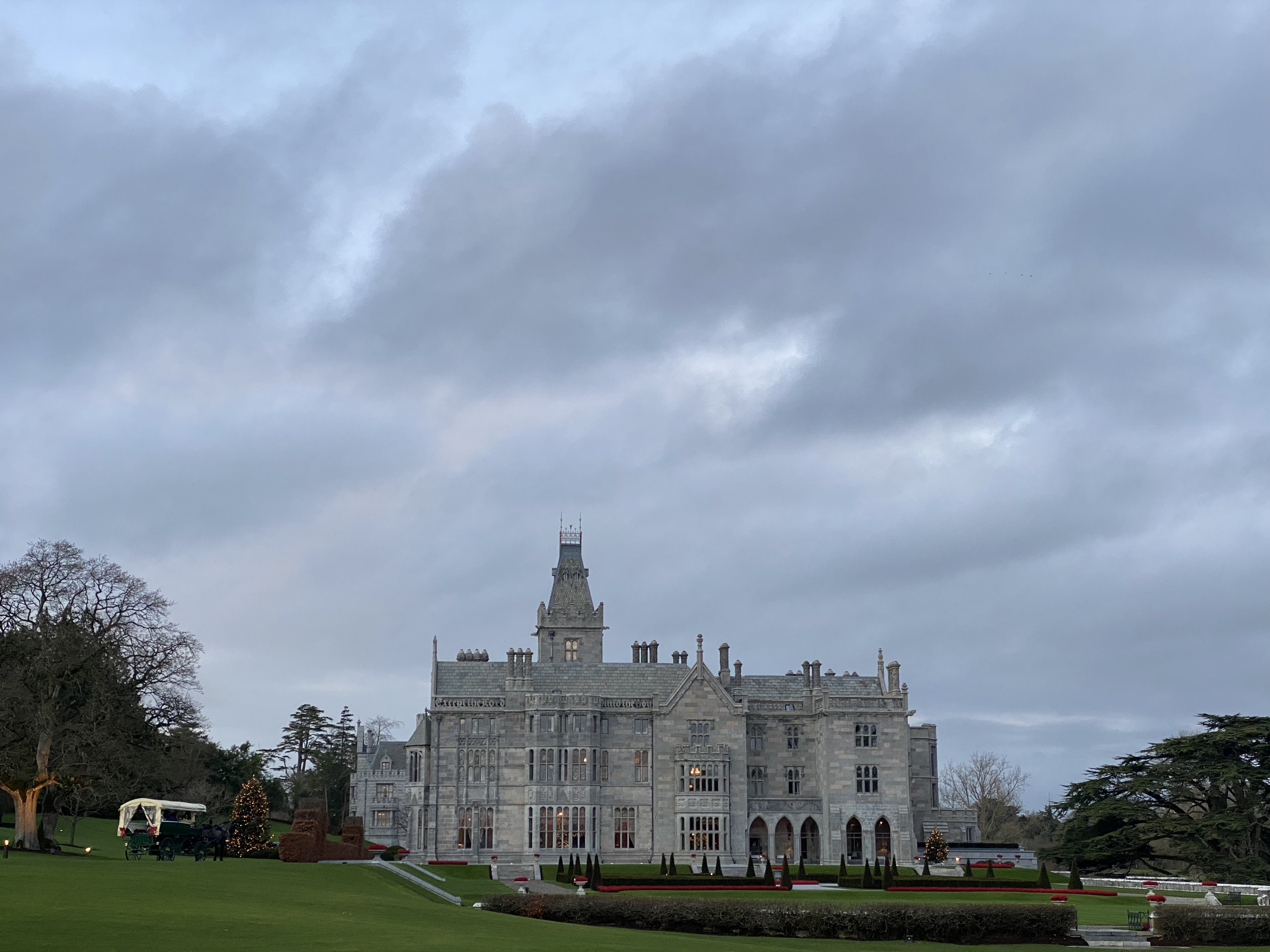

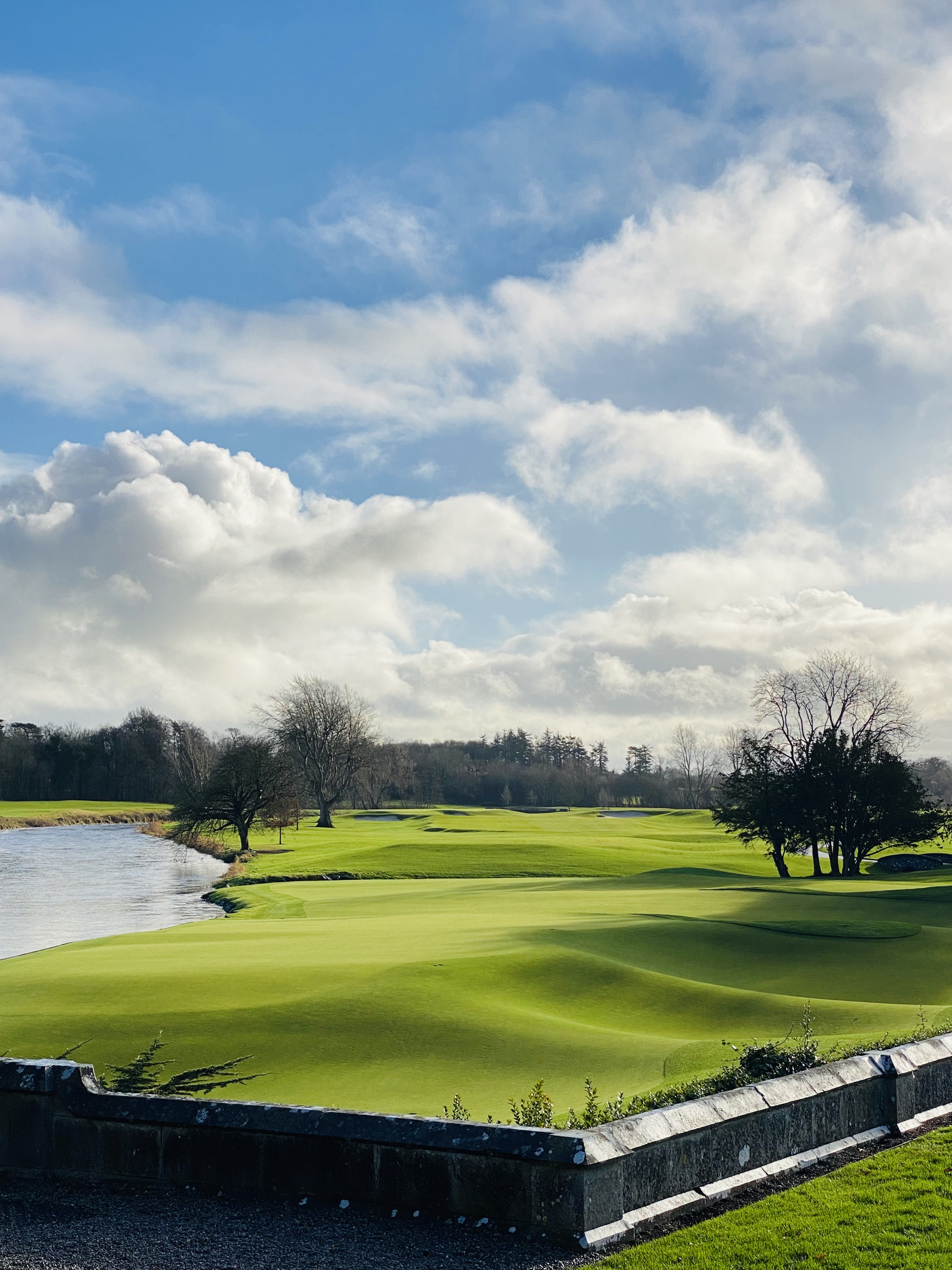

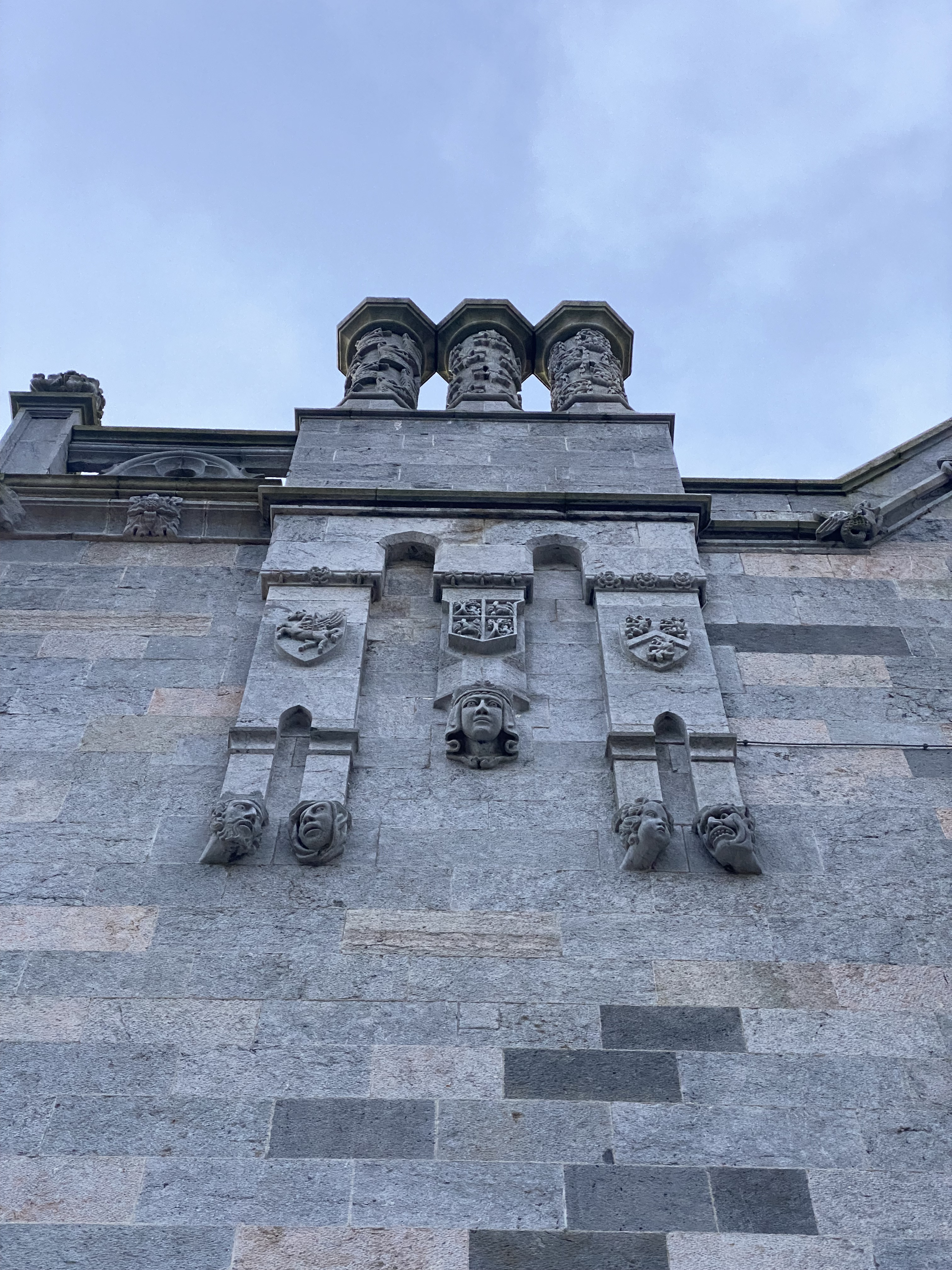

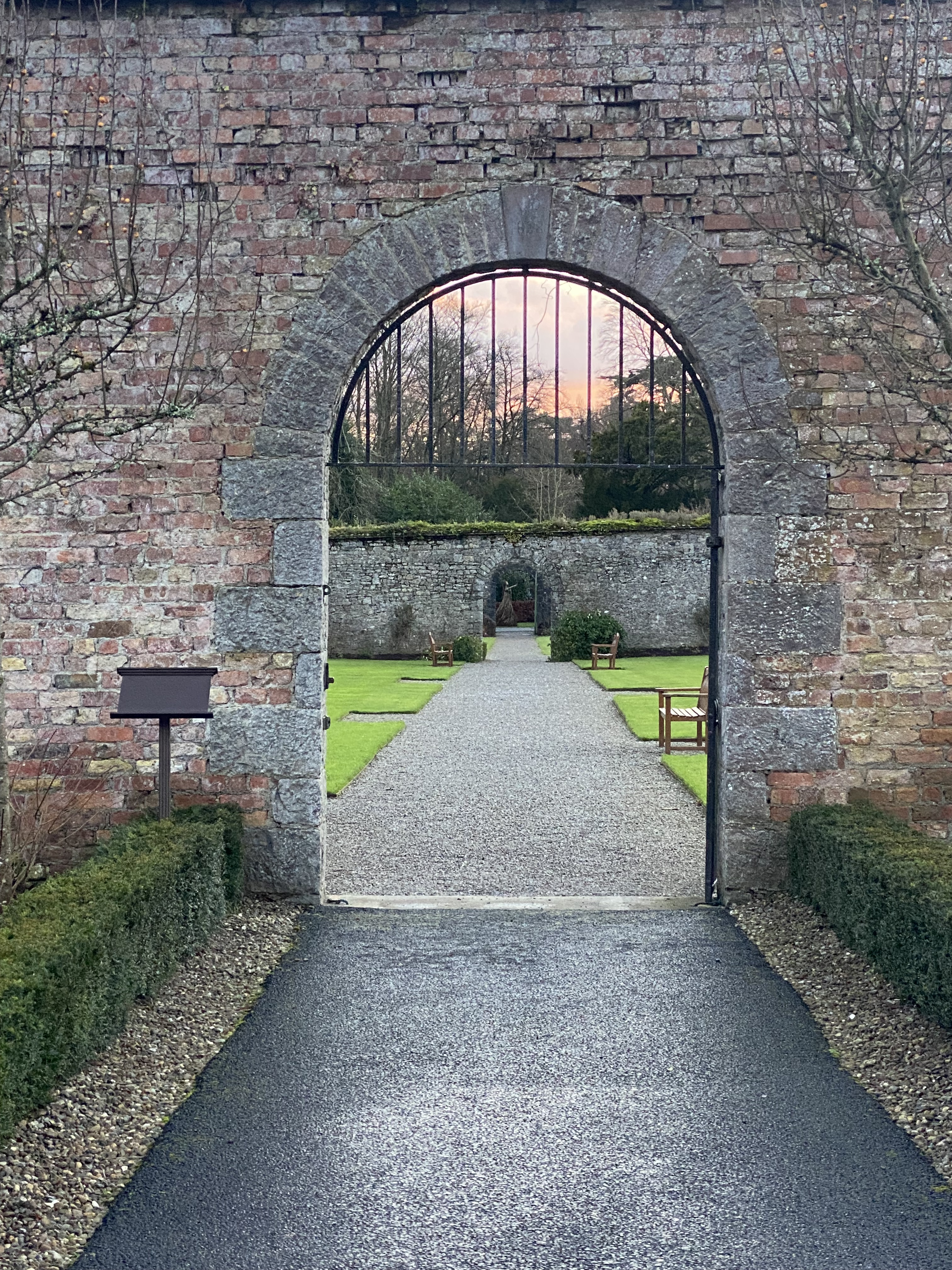

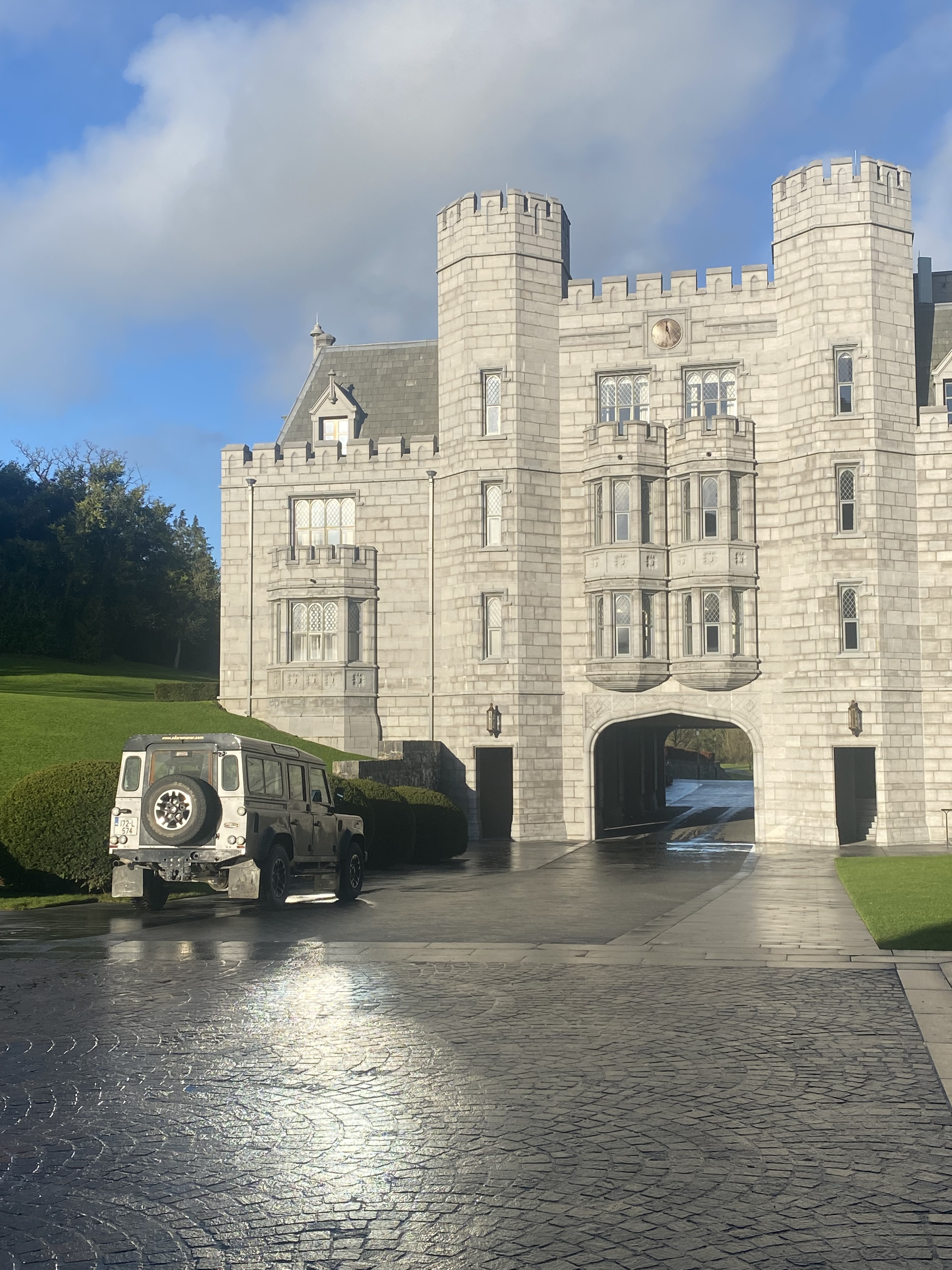
