= PGA European Tour =

Golf tour in Europe

- Current season, competition or edition: 2027 European Tour
- Formerly: Volvo Tour; PGA European Tour; PGA European Golf Tour; PGA European Tournament Players' Division; PGA Tournament Players' Division; PGA Tournament Players' Section
- Sport: Golf
- First season: 1972
- CEO: Guy Kinnings
- Director: Eric Nicoli (Chairman)
- Countries: Based in Europe (Note: Schedules have also included events in Asia, Africa, Australasia, South America and North America.)
- Most titles: Order of Merit titles: (Northern Ireland) Rory McIlroy (8) (Scotland) Colin Montgomerie (8); Tournament wins: (Spain) Seve Ballesteros (50)
- Broadcasters: Sky Sports (UK); Golf Channel (United States)
- Related competitions: Challenge Tour; European Senior Tour; Safari Circuit
- Website: europeantour.com

The European Tour, currently titled as the DP World Tour for sponsorship reasons, and legally the PGA European Tour or the European Tour Group, is the leading men's professional golf tour in Europe. The organisation also operates the European Senior Tour (for players aged 50 or older) and the developmental Challenge Tour; the second tier of men's professional golf in Europe. The tour's headquarters are at Wentworth Club in Virginia Water, Surrey, England. The European Tour was established by the British-based Professional Golfers' Association (PGA) through the 1970s, and responsibility was transferred to an independent PGA European Tour organisation in 1984.

Most tournaments on the PGA European Tour's three tours are held in Europe, but starting in the 1980s, an increasing number have been held in other parts of the world. In 2015, a majority of the ranking events on the European Tour were held outside Europe, though this included both Majors and World Golf Championship events that are ranking events for multiple tours. Europe-based events are nearly all played in Western Europe, with the most lucrative of them taking place in the United Kingdom, Ireland, Germany, France and Spain.

The PGA European Tour is a golfer-controlled organisation whose primary purpose is to maximise the income of tournament golfers. It is a company limited by guarantee and is run by a professional staff but controlled by its playing members via a board of directors composed of 12 elected past and present tour players and a tournament committee of 14 current players. The chairman of the board is Eric Nicoli, who replaced David Williams in 2023. The chairman of the tournament committee is David Howell.

The PGA European Tour is the lead partner in Ryder Cup Europe, a joint venture also including the PGA of Great Britain and Ireland and PGA of Europe that operates the Ryder Cup matches in cooperation with the PGA of America. The PGA European Tour has a 60% interest in Ryder Cup Europe, with each of its junior partners holding 20%.

== History ==
Professional golf began in Europe, specifically in Scotland. The first professionals were clubmakers and greenkeepers who also taught golf to the wealthy men who could afford to play the game (early handmade equipment was expensive) and played "challenge matches" against one another for purses put up by wealthy backers. The first multi-competitor stroke play tournament was The Open Championship, which was introduced in 1860. Over the following decades, the number of golf tournaments offering prize money increased slowly but steadily. Most were in the United Kingdom, but there were also several "national opens" in various countries of continental Europe.

In 1901, The Professional Golfers' Association was founded to represent the interests of professional golfers throughout Great Britain and Ireland. It was this body that ultimately created the European Tour. As the tournament circuit grew, in 1937 the Harry Vardon Trophy was created to be awarded to the member of the PGA with the best stroke average in select major stroke play tournaments of the season. This would later become known as the Order of Merit, and at different times has been calculated using stroke average, a points system and money earned. Each year the PGA would determine which tournaments were to be included for the Order of Merit.

By the post-World War II period, prize money was becoming more significant, with sponsors being attracted by the introduction of television coverage, and as such it was becoming more feasible for professional golfers to make a living by playing alone. In the United States, a formal organised tour, which later became known as the PGA Tour, had been administered by the PGA of America since the 1930s. However, even into the 1960s and 1970s, the majority of tournaments in Europe were still organised separately by the host golf club or association, or a commercial promoter.

In 1972, The Professional Golfers' Association created an integrated "European tour" with the inclusion of eight major tournaments in Continental Europe on their Order of Merit schedule. These tournaments were the French Open, which was first included in 1970; the Italian, Spanish, German and Swiss Opens, which were included in 1971; and the Dutch Open, the Madrid Open and the Lancia d'Oro tournament, which were included for the first time. As such, the 1972 season is now officially recognised as the first season of the PGA European Tour. For several years, the British PGA and continental circuits continued to run separately, each with their own Order of Merit. Following the example set in the U.S., and having been threatened with a breakaway, in 1975 the PGA agreed to amend their constitution, giving the tournament side more autonomy with the formation of the Tournament Players Division. In 1977, the Tournament Players Division joined with the Continental Tournament Players Association to become the European Tournament Players Division. The following year, it was agreed with the European Golf Association that the Continental Order of Merit would be discontinued.

In its early years, the season ran for 20 tournaments from April to October, and took place in nine European countries: Spain, England, Ireland, Scotland, France, Switzerland, West Germany, the Netherlands and Italy. Over the next three decades, the tour gradually lengthened and globalised. The first event held outside of Europe was the 1982 Tunisian Open. That year, there were 27 tournaments and the season stretched into November for the first time. In 1984, the PGA European Tour became independent of The Professional Golfers' Association. The following year, the tour became "all-exempt" with the end of pre-qualifying for tournaments.

The European Tour has always been sensitive to the risk that its best players will leave to play on the PGA Tour for many reasons. The PGA Tour usually offers higher purses and European players want to increase their chances of glory in the three majors played in the U.S. by playing on more U.S.-style courses to acclimate themselves. In an attempt to counter this phenomenon, the European Tour introduced the "Volvo Bonus Pool" in 1988. This was extra prize money which was distributed at the end of the season to the most successful players of the year—but only golfers who had played in a high number of the European Tour's events could receive a share. This system continued until 1998, after which renewed emphasis was placed on maximising prize money in individual tournaments.

In 1989, the tour visited Asia for the first time for the Dubai Desert Classic. By 1990, there were 38 events on the schedule, including 37 in Europe, and the start of the season had moved up to February. A first visit to East Asia for the Tour occurred at the 1992 Johnnie Walker Classic in Bangkok. This has since proven to be one of the most notable initiatives in the history of the tour, as East Asia is becoming almost its second home. Shortly afterwards, the tour also made its debut in the former Soviet Bloc at the 1994 Czech Open, but much less has come of this development as participation in golf in the former Soviet region remains low and sponsors there are unable to compete financially with their Western European rivals for the limited number of slots available on the main tour each summer. However, the second-tier Challenge Tour has visited Central and Eastern Europe somewhat more frequently. In 1995, the European Tour began a policy of co-sanctioning tournaments with other PGA Tours, by endorsing the South African PGA Championship on the Southern African Tour (now the Sunshine Tour). This policy was extended to the PGA Tour of Australasia in 1996, and to the Asian Tour in 1999, starting with the Malaysian Open.

In 1998, the European Tour added the three U.S. majors – the Masters Tournament, the PGA Championship and the U.S. Open – to its official schedule. The leading European Tour players had all been competing in them for many years, but now their prize money counted toward the Order of Merit (a year later for the Masters Tournament), which sometimes made a great deal of difference to the end-of-season rankings. The following year, in 1999, the World Golf Championships (WGC) were established with the three individual tournaments, also offering substantially more prize money than most European events, added to the European Tour schedule.

Since the minimum number of events a player must play to retain membership of the European Tour was 11, the addition of the majors and WGCs meant players could potentially become members, or retain membership, of the tour by playing just four other events. Players such as Ernie Els and Retief Goosen have taken advantage of this to play the PGA and European Tours concurrently. For the 2009 season, the minimum number of events required for members was increased to 12; this coincided with the elevation of the HSBC Champions, previously a European Tour event co-sanctioned by three other tours, to World Golf Championships status. The minimum increased to 13 in 2011, but beginning in 2013, team events such as the Ryder Cup and Presidents Cup were allowed to count towards the minimum. In 2016, the 13-event minimum was changed to five events, not counting the four majors and four WGCs; while this change did not affect players eligible for all the majors and WGCs, it made it easier for players not eligible for these to retain European Tour membership while playing a full PGA Tour schedule. The minimum was reduced from five to four in 2018.

In November 2021, the tour was retitled as the DP World Tour as part of a sponsorship agreement with Dubai-based DP World.

In August 2025, the DP World Tour signed a three-year agreement with Trackmen, a developer of radar tracking technology, to become the Official Launch Monitor and Official Ball Tracing Technology of the tour.

=== Strategic alliance with the PGA Tour ===
In November 2020, the tour entered into a "strategic alliance" with the PGA Tour. As part of the agreement, the PGA Tour acquired a 15% stake in European Tour Productions, the Scottish Open gained a new title sponsor and became co-sanctioned by the PGA Tour, and two regular PGA Tour tournaments also became co-sanctioned by the European Tour: the Barbasol Championship and the Barracuda Championship. There was also a new sponsor and increased prize fund for the Irish Open. In June 2022, in response to the emergence of LIV Golf, the tours announced that the PGA Tour were increasing their stake to 40% and further changes to the tour, including increased prize funds and leading players in the DP World Tour Rankings gaining PGA Tour cards for the following season.

== Status and prize money ==
The European Tour is considered the second most important tour in men's golf, behind the U.S.-based PGA Tour, but it retains significantly higher standing than other leading golf tours around the world. This status is reflected by the minimum world ranking points available in each tours respective tournaments, and prize money available. The total prize money available on the European Tour is approximately half that of the PGA Tour. However, this includes the majors and World Golf Championships, which are the most lucrative on the schedule, so the difference for regular tournaments is substantially higher. There is also much more variation in prize funds between tournaments on the European Tour than on the PGA Tour. Even though the prize funds of many European Tour events have increased rapidly since the late 1990s, especially with the introduction of the Race to Dubai and the Rolex Series, on occasion the European Tour has failed to attract as many leading players to its events as in the past, with even some of the top European players staying away.

For many players, the European Tour is seen as a stepping-stone to the PGA Tour. During the late 20th century, the European Tour was traditionally the first overseas move for outstanding players from non-European countries, particularly in the Commonwealth, and a major source for elite golfers, such as Greg Norman, Nick Price and Ernie Els. These players tended to move to the PGA Tour as a second step. When Continental Europe produced its first global golf stars in the 1970s, such as Seve Ballesteros, and especially when Europe began to notch wins over the U.S. in the Ryder Cup in the mid-1980s, there was widespread optimism about the future standing of the European Tour relative to the PGA Tour. This has ebbed away as leading players continued to base themselves in the U.S. and several major European countries, such as Germany and Italy, have not regularly produced high-ranked golfers, as was formerly anticipated. Nonetheless, the number of European countries which have produced winners on the European Tour and PGA Tour has increased, with notable golfing depth developing in the Scandinavian countries.

However, since the late-1990s, more young golfers from around the world are starting their careers directly in the U.S., often having attended college as amateurs, usually with golf scholarships, before turning professional. Conversely, some young American players have sought to kick-start their professional careers in Europe, having failed to qualify for either PGA Tour or its development tour. For example, former world number one amateur, Peter Uihlein, announced in December 2011 that he would not return for his final semester at Oklahoma State University and would begin professional play in Europe the following month, both through sponsor's exemptions on the main European Tour and on the developmental Challenge Tour. It is a route that has been successfully followed, most notably by multiple major winner Brooks Koepka.

It has been claimed that the finances of the European Tour depend heavily on the Ryder Cup. Days before the start of the 2014 Ryder Cup, American golf journalist Bob Harig noted:

"In simple terms, the European Tour loses money in non-Ryder Cup years, makes a tidy profit in years the event is played in the United States (where the PGA of America, not the PGA Tour, owns the event and reaps the majority of the income), and then hits the lottery in years the tournament is staged in Europe. Earlier this year, Golfweek reported that the European Tour made more than 14 million pounds in pre-tax profit in 2010, the last time the Ryder Cup was staged in Europe. A year later, when there was no Ryder Cup, it lost more than 2.2 million pounds."

Harig also added that the PGA European Tour extracts significant concessions from Ryder Cup venues. The owners of the 2006 and 2010 venues (Sir Michael Smurfit and Sir Terry Matthews, respectively) committed to hosting European Tour events at their venues for more than a decade after winning bidding, and guaranteed the purses for those tour events.

== The structure of the European Tour season ==
=== A typical season ===
Since 2000, with the exception of 2012, the season has actually started late in the previous calendar year, but the seasons are still named by calendar year, rather than for example 2005–06, which would reflect the actual span of play. All of the events up until late March take place outside Europe, with most of these being co-sanctioned with other tours. From then on, the tour plays mainly in Europe, and the events in its home continent generally have higher prize money than those held elsewhere, excluding the major championships, which were added to the tour schedule in 1998; three individual World Golf Championships events, added the following year, most of which take place in the U.S.; and the HSBC Champions, elevated to World Golf Championships status in 2009.

There are generally only minor variations in the overall pattern from one year to the next. Occasionally, tournaments change venue, and quite often change name, particularly when they get a new sponsor, but the principal events have fixed and traditional places in the schedule, and this determines the rhythm of the season.

=== Race to Dubai ===
In 2009, the Order of Merit was replaced by the Race to Dubai, with a bonus pool of US$7.5 million (originally $10 million) distributed among the top 15 players at the end of the season, with the winner taking $1.5 million (originally $2 million). The new name reflected the addition of a new season ending tournament, the Dubai World Championship, held at the end of November in Dubai. The tournament also had a $7.5 million prize fund (originally $10 million), and was contested by the leading 60 players in the race following the season's penultimate event, the Hong Kong Open. The winner of the Race to Dubai also receives a 10-year European Tour exemption, while the winner of the Dubai World Championship receives a five-year exemption. The reduction in prize money, announced in September 2009, was due to the global economic downturn. In 2012, the bonus pool was reduced to $3.75 million with the winner getting $1 million and only the top 10 golfers getting a bonus. The bonus pool was increased to $5 million in 2014 with the top 15 players earning part of the pool. 2019 saw further changes: in 2018, the top 10 finishers on the Race to Dubai shared the bonus pool of $5 million, but as of 2019, the sum was split between only the leading five finishers. Whoever topped the standings received an additional $2 million compared with the $1.25 million won by Francesco Molinari in 2018. In addition, the DP World Tour Championship, Dubai was cut to the top 50 golfers on the Race to Dubai list, the prize fund was kept at $8 million, but the winner's share was increased to $3 million. This was designed to increase interest and player participation in the event.

In November 2021, the Race to Dubai was renamed the DP World Tour Rankings in line with the tour being retitled as the DP World Tour. However, in November 2022, the tour announced that the Rankings would be reverted to the Race to Dubai, starting from the 2023 season.

As of November 2025, the players with the most Race to Dubai/Order of Merit victories, dating back to the European Tour's beginning in 1972, included Colin Montgomerie with eight wins, Rory McIlroy with seven wins, and Seve Ballesteros with six wins.

=== Rolex Series ===
For the 2017 season, the European Tour launched the Rolex Series, a series of events with higher prize funds than regular tour events, to celebrate the 20th anniversary of the partnership between Rolex and the Tour. The series began with eight events, each with a minimum prize fund of $7 million. As of 2025, the Rolex Series consists of five events, each with a purse of $9 million (except for the DP World Tour Championship with $10 million).

In January 2026, the DP World Tour and Rolex announced a "long-term extension of their long-running partnership", with the later continuing its role as the official timekeeper of the tour, which it has done since 1997.

== Order of Merit winners ==
The European Tour's money list was known as the "Order of Merit" until 2009, when it was replaced by the Race to Dubai. It is calculated in euro, although around half of the events have prize funds which are fixed in other currencies, mainly pounds sterling or U.S. dollars. In these instances, the amounts are converted into euro at the exchange rate for the week that the tournament is played. The winner of the Order of Merit receives the Harry Vardon Trophy, not to be confused with the Vardon Trophy awarded by the PGA of America.

== Leading career money winners ==
The table below shows the top 10 career money leaders on the European Tour. Due to increases in prize money over the years, it is dominated by current players. The figures are not the players' complete career earnings, as most of them have earned millions more on other tours (especially the PGA Tour) or from non-tour events. In addition, elite golfers often earn several times as much from endorsements and golf-related business interests as they do from prize money.

Rank	Player	Prize money (€)
1	(Northern Ireland) Rory McIlroy	76,227,058
2	(England) Lee Westwood	38,825,014
3	(England) Justin Rose	36,168,121
4	(England) Tommy Fleetwood	34,071,123
5	(England) Tyrrell Hatton	32,875,630
6	(Spain) Jon Rahm	32,730,121
7	(England) Matt Fitzpatrick	30,516,166
8	(Spain) Sergio García	30,100,249
9	(Sweden) Henrik Stenson	28,811,144
10	(Republic of Ireland) Pádraig Harrington	28,739,248

As of the 2026 season.

== Awards ==
=== Golfer of the Year ===
The European Tour Golfer of the Year was an award handed out by a panel comprising members of the Association of Golf Writers (AGW) and commentators from television and radio. The award was created in 1985 and lasted until 2020, when it merged with the Players' Player of the Year award in 2021.

=== Players' Player of the Year ===
The European Tour Players' Player of the Year was inaugurated in 2008, with the winner being determined by a vote of tour members. In 2017, the award was renamed as the Seve Ballesteros Award in honour of the legendary Spanish golfer. From 2021 onwards, the Seve Ballesteros Award merged with the Golfer of the Year award, creating one singular honour voted for by the players.

=== Rookie of the Year ===
The Sir Henry Cotton Rookie of the Year award is named after the English three-time Open Champion Sir Henry Cotton. Originally chosen by Henry Cotton himself, the winner was later selected by a panel consisting of the PGA European Tour, The Royal and Ancient Golf Club of St Andrews, and the Association of Golf Writers. It is currently given to the rookie who places highest in the Race to Dubai. The award was first presented in 1960, and thus predates the official start of the tour in 1972. There were five years (1962, 1964, 1965, 1967, and 1975) in which the Rookie of the Year Award was not given.

=== Graduate of the Year ===
The European Challenge Tour Graduate of the Year was inaugurated in 2013 and is awarded to the highest ranked player in the Race to Dubai who graduated from the Challenge Tour in the previous season.

=== Winners ===
Year	Player of the Year		Rookie of the Year	Graduate of the Year
2026			(Japan) Kota Kaneko	No award
2025	(England) Marco Penge		(France) Martin Couvra	No award
2024	(Northern Ireland) Rory McIlroy (4)		(Sweden) Jesper Svensson	No award
2023	(Poland) Adrian Meronk		(Japan) Ryo Hisatsune	(New Zealand) Daniel Hillier
2022	(New Zealand) Ryan Fox		(South Africa) Thriston Lawrence	No award
2021	(Spain) Jon Rahm (2)		(Germany) Matti Schmid	No award
Year	Golfer of the Year	Players' Player of the Year	Rookie of the Year	Graduate of the Year
2020	(England) Lee Westwood (4)	(England) Lee Westwood (2)	(Finland) Sami Välimäki	(France) Antoine Rozner
2019	(Spain) Jon Rahm	(Spain) Jon Rahm	(Scotland) Robert MacIntyre	(Scotland) Robert MacIntyre
2018	(Italy) Francesco Molinari	(Italy) Francesco Molinari	(India) Shubhankar Sharma	(South Africa) Erik van Rooyen
2017	(Spain) Sergio García	(England) Tommy Fleetwood	(Spain) Jon Rahm	(South Africa) Dylan Frittelli
2016	(Sweden) Henrik Stenson (2)	(Sweden) Henrik Stenson (2)	(South Korea) Wang Jeung-hun	(Spain) Nacho Elvira
2015	(Northern Ireland) Rory McIlroy (3)	(Northern Ireland) Rory McIlroy (3)	(South Korea) An Byeong-hun	(South Korea) An Byeong-hun
2014	(Northern Ireland) Rory McIlroy (2)	(Northern Ireland) Rory McIlroy (2)	(United States) Brooks Koepka	(United States) Brooks Koepka
2013	(Sweden) Henrik Stenson	(Sweden) Henrik Stenson	(United States) Peter Uihlein	(South Africa) Justin Walters
2012	(Northern Ireland) Rory McIlroy	(Northern Ireland) Rory McIlroy	(Portugal) Ricardo Santos	No award
2011	(England) Luke Donald	(England) Luke Donald	(England) Tom Lewis	No award
2010	(Germany) Martin Kaymer and (Northern Ireland) Graeme McDowell (shared)	(Germany) Martin Kaymer	(Italy) Matteo Manassero	No award
2009	(England) Lee Westwood (3)	(England) Lee Westwood	(England) Chris Wood	No award
2008	(Republic of Ireland) Pádraig Harrington (2)	(Republic of Ireland) Pádraig Harrington	(Spain) Pablo Larrazábal	No award
2007	(Republic of Ireland) Pádraig Harrington	No award	(Germany) Martin Kaymer	No award
2006	(England) Paul Casey	No award	(Scotland) Marc Warren	No award
2005	(New Zealand) Michael Campbell	No award	(Spain) Gonzalo Fernández-Castaño	No award
2004	(Fiji) Vijay Singh	No award	(Scotland) Scott Drummond	No award
2003	(South Africa) Ernie Els (3)	No award	(Republic of Ireland) Peter Lawrie	No award
2002	(South Africa) Ernie Els (2)	No award	(England) Nick Dougherty	No award
2001	(South Africa) Retief Goosen	No award	(England) Paul Casey	No award
2000	(England) Lee Westwood (2)	No award	(England) Ian Poulter	No award
1999	(Scotland) Colin Montgomerie (4)	No award	(Spain) Sergio García	No award
1998	(England) Lee Westwood	No award	(France) Olivier Edmond	No award
1997	(Scotland) Colin Montgomerie (3)	No award	(Scotland) Scott Henderson	No award
1996	(Scotland) Colin Montgomerie (2)	No award	(Denmark) Thomas Bjørn	No award
1995	(Scotland) Colin Montgomerie	No award	(Sweden) Jarmo Sandelin	No award
1994	(South Africa) Ernie Els	No award	(England) Jonathan Lomas	No award
1993	(Germany) Bernhard Langer (2)	No award	(Scotland) Gary Orr	No award
1992	(England) Nick Faldo (3)	No award	(England) Jim Payne	No award
1991	(Spain) Seve Ballesteros (3)	No award	(Sweden) Per-Ulrik Johansson	No award
1990	(England) Nick Faldo (2)	No award	(England) Russell Claydon	No award
1989	(England) Nick Faldo	No award	(England) Paul Broadhurst	No award
1988	(Spain) Seve Ballesteros (2)	No award	(Scotland) Colin Montgomerie	No award
1987	(Wales) Ian Woosnam	No award	(England) Peter Baker	No award
1986	(Spain) Seve Ballesteros	No award	(Spain) José María Olazábal	No award
1985	(West Germany) Bernhard Langer	No award	(Wales) Paul Thomas	No award
1984	No award	No award	(Wales) Philip Parkin	No award
1983	No award	No award	(England) Grant Turner	No award
1982	No award	No award	(Scotland) Gordon Brand Jnr	No award
1981	No award	No award	(England) Jeremy Bennett	No award
1980	No award	No award	(England) Paul Hoad	No award
1979	No award	No award	(Scotland) Mike Miller	No award
1978	No award	No award	(Scotland) Sandy Lyle	No award
1977	No award	No award	(England) Nick Faldo	No award
1976	No award	No award	(England) Mark James	No award
1975	No award	No award	No award	No award
1974	No award	No award	(England) Carl Mason	No award
1973	No award	No award	(England) Pip Elson	No award
1972	No award	No award	(Scotland) Sam Torrance	No award
1971	No award	No award	(Wales) David Llewellyn	No award
1970	No award	No award	(England) Stuart Brown	No award
1969	No award	No award	(England) Peter Oosterhuis	No award
1968	No award	No award	(Scotland) Bernard Gallacher	No award
1967	No award	No award	No award	No award
1966	No award	No award	(Scotland) Robin Liddle	No award
1965	No award	No award	No award	No award
1964	No award	No award	No award	No award
1963	No award	No award	(England) Tony Jacklin	No award
1962	No award	No award	No award	No award
1961	No award	No award	(England) Alex Caygill	No award
1960	No award	No award	(England) Tommy Goodwin	No award

== Chief Executives ==
Since the tour's formation in 1972, there have been five Chief Executives. They are as follows:

- John Jacobs (1972–1975)
- Ken Schofield (1975–2004)
- George O'Grady (2005–2015)
- Keith Pelley (2015–2024)
- Guy Kinnings (2024–present)

== Television ==
- France: Canal+ Sport
- Poland: Polsat Sport
- Germany: Sky Deutschland
- Italy: Sky Italia
- Portugal: Sport TV
- Spain: Movistar Golf
- United Kingdom and Ireland: Sky Sports
- Americas: Golf Channel
- Poland, Czech Republic, Slovakia: Golf Channel
- Balkans: Sportklub
- Middle East and North Africa: Golflife
- Sub-Saharan Africa: SuperSport
- China: CCTV
- Japan: U-NEXT
- Korea: JTBC Golf
- India: Sony TEN
- Thailandia, Malaysia: Golf Channel
- Singapore: StarHub
- Hong Kong: Now Sports
- Scandinavia: Viasat Golf
- Vietnam: VTVCab
- Australia: Fox Sports
- New Zealand: Sky Sport NZ

== See also ==
- List of golfers with most European Tour wins
- Ladies European Tour: the top European women's professional tour.
