= 1936 Open Championship =

1936 golf tournament held at the Royal Liverpool Golf Club, Hoylake, Wirral, England

Coordinates: 53.385°N 3.190°W

Tournament information
- Dates: 25–27 June 1936
- Location: Hoylake, England
- Course: Royal Liverpool Golf Club

Statistics
- Par: 74
- Length: 7,078 yards (6,472 m)
- Field: 107 players, 62 after cut
- Cut: 156 (+8)
- Prize fund: £500
- Winner's share: £100

Champion
- (England) Alf Padgham
- 287 (−9)

Location in England
Royal Liverpool Golf Club in Hoylake, Merseyside, west of Liverpool, England

The 1936 Open Championship was the 71st Open Championship, held 25–27 June at Royal Liverpool Golf Club in Hoylake, England. Alf Padgham won his only major title, one stroke ahead of runner-up Jimmy Adams.

Qualifying was scheduled for 22–23 June, Monday and Tuesday, with 18 holes at Royal Liverpool and 18 holes at Wallasey, and the top 100 and ties qualified. Heavy rain caused the first day's play to be abandoned; a lightning bolt stunned three spectators and a caddy, and the greens were under water, some up to six inches (15 cm). All the scores were voided; Henry Cotton had completed his round of 67 at Wallasey before play was abandoned. Tuesday proceeded as scheduled and the Monday round was played on Wednesday. Cotton led the qualifiers on 139, having scored 68 at Wallasey on the rearranged day, with Wally Smithers two shots behind on 141; the qualifying score was 155 and 107 players advanced. With the weather delay, the championship began on Thursday and concluded with two rounds on Saturday.

After the second round on Friday, Bill Cox and Adams were tied for the lead, with five players a shot back, including Padgham and Henry Cotton. The 36-hole cut was the top sixty and ties; it was at 156 (+8) and 62 advanced.

After the third round on Saturday morning, Adams and Cotton shared the lead, with Padgham and Tom Green a stroke behind. In the final round that afternoon, Padgham tied Adams for the lead at the turn. He made a four on the 17th, then made a 15-footer (4.5 m) for a three at the 18th to post a 287 total. Adams stood on the 17th knowing that he needed to play the last two holes in eight strokes to tie Padgham. His approach shot found a greenside bunker, and after he failed to get up-and-down he now needed a three on the 18th. He found the green in two, but his twelve-foot (3.7 m) putt lipped out and he finished a stroke behind Padgham. Cotton and Green were still on the course, but neither could mount a charge, giving Padgham the championship.

Future four-time Open champion Bobby Locke tied for eighth in his major championship debut. Jim Ferrier, the winner of the PGA Championship in 1947, also played in his first major and finished 44th. Both were among the eleven amateurs to make the cut, with Locke as low amateur.

== Course ==
| Hole | Name | Yards | Par | Hole | Name | Yards | Par |
|---|---|---|---|---|---|---|---|
| 1 | Course | 435 | 4 | 10 | Dee | 455 | 5 |
| 2 | Road | 419 | 4 | 11 | Alps | 193 | 3 |
| 3 | Long | 480 | 5 | 12 | Hilbre | 464 | 5 |
| 4 | New | 158 | 3 | 13 | Rushes | 179 | 3 |
| 5 | Telegraph | 424 | 4 | 14 | Field | 511 | 5 |
| 6 | Briars | 438 | 4 | 15 | Lake | 443 | 4 |
| 7 | Dowie | 200 | 3 | 16 | Dun | 532 | 5 |
| 8 | Far | 527 | 5 | 17 | Royal | 419 | 4 |
| 9 | Punch Bowl | 393 | 4 | 18 | Stand | 408 | 4 |
| Out | | 3,474 | 36 | In | | 3,604 | 38 |
| Source: | | | | Total | | 7,078 | 74 |

== Round summaries ==
=== First round ===
Thursday, 25 June 1936

| Place | Player | Score | To par |
|---|---|---|---|
| 1 | (England) Bill Cox | 70 | −4 |
| 2 | (Scotland) Jimmy Adams | 71 | −3 |
| T3 | (England) Bill Davies | 72 | −2 |
| T3 | (Scotland) Jack McLean (a) | 72 | −2 |
| T3 | (England) Reg Whitcombe | 72 | −2 |
| T6 | (England) Henry Cotton | 73 | −1 |
| T6 | (France) Marcel Dallemagne | 73 | −1 |
| T6 | (England) Francis Francis (a) | 73 | −1 |
| T6 | (England) Alf Padgham | 73 | −1 |
| T6 | (United States) Gene Sarazen | 73 | −1 |
| T6 | (England) Charles Whitcombe | 73 | −1 |

=== Second round ===
Friday, 26 June 1936

| Place | Player | Score | To par |
|---|---|---|---|
| T1 | (Scotland) Jimmy Adams | 71-73=144 | −4 |
| T1 | (England) Bill Cox | 70-74=144 | −4 |
| T3 | (England) Dick Burton | 74-71=145 | −3 |
| T3 | (England) Henry Cotton | 73-72=145 | −3 |
| T3 | (France) Marcel Dallemagne | 73-72=145 | −3 |
| T3 | (England) Francis Francis (a) | 73-72=145 | −3 |
| T3 | (England) Alf Padgham | 73-72=145 | −3 |
| T8 | (England) Percy Alliss | 74-72=146 | −2 |
| T8 | (England) Dick Burton | 74-71=146 | −2 |
| T8 | (Wales) Tom Green | 74-72=146 | −2 |

=== Third round ===
Saturday, 27 June 1936 (morning)

| Place | Player | Score | To par |
|---|---|---|---|
| T1 | (Scotland) Jimmy Adams | 71-73-71=215 | −7 |
| T1 | (England) Henry Cotton | 73-72-70=215 | −7 |
| T3 | (Wales) Tom Green | 74-72-70=216 | −6 |
| T3 | (England) Alf Padgham | 73-72-71=216 | −6 |
| 5 | (United States) Gene Sarazen | 73-75-70=218 | −4 |
| T6 | (England) Percy Alliss | 74-72-74=220 | −2 |
| T6 | (England) Dick Burton | 74-71-75=220 | −2 |
| T6 | (France) Marcel Dallemagne | 73-72-75=220 | −2 |
| T6 | (Wales) Dai Rees | 77-71-72=220 | −2 |
| 10 | (England) Bill Davies | 72-76-73=221 | −1 |

=== Final round ===
Saturday, 27 June 1936 (afternoon)

| Place | Player | Score | To par | Money (£) |
|---|---|---|---|---|
| 1 | (England) Alf Padgham | 73-72-71-71=287 | −9 | 100 |
| 2 | (Scotland) Jimmy Adams | 71-73-71-73=288 | −8 | 75 |
| T3 | (England) Henry Cotton | 73-72-70-74=289 | −7 | 40 |
| T3 | (France) Marcel Dallemagne | 73-72-75-69=289 | −7 | 40 |
| T5 | (England) Percy Alliss | 74-72-74-71=291 | −5 | 21; 13s 4d |
| T5 | (Wales) Tom Green | 74-72-70-75=291 | −5 | 21; 13s 4d |
| T5 | (United States) Gene Sarazen | 73-75-70-73=291 | −5 | 21; 13s 4d |
| T8 | (England) Arthur Lacey | 76-74-72-72=294 | −2 | 15 |
| T8 | (South Africa) Bobby Locke (a) | 75-73-72-74=294 | −2 | 0 |
| T8 | (England) Reg Whitcombe | 72-77-71-74=294 | −2 | 15 |

Amateurs: Locke (−2), Thomson (+3), Francis (+6), McLean (+10), Ferrier (+14), Flaherty (+14),
Woollam (+14), Roberts (+15), Pennink (+16), Timmis (+17), Walker (+18)
