= Dutch Open (golf) =

Annual golf tournament in the Netherlands

Coordinates: 52.328°N 4.803°E

KLM Open

Tournament information
- Location: Amsterdam, Netherlands
- Established: 1912
- Course: The International
- Par: 71
- Length: 6,914 yards (6,322 m)
- Tour: European Tour
- Format: Stroke play
- Prize fund: US$2,750,000
- Month played: June

Tournament record score
- Aggregate: 261 Thomas Pieters (2015)
- To par: −23 Kristoffer Broberg (2021)

Current champion
- (Spain) Eugenio Chacarra

Location map
- Location in the Netherlands

The Dutch Open, now again called the KLM Open, is an annual golf tournament played in the Netherlands, and has been part of the European Tour's schedule since the Tour was inaugurated in 1972.

== History and sponsorship ==
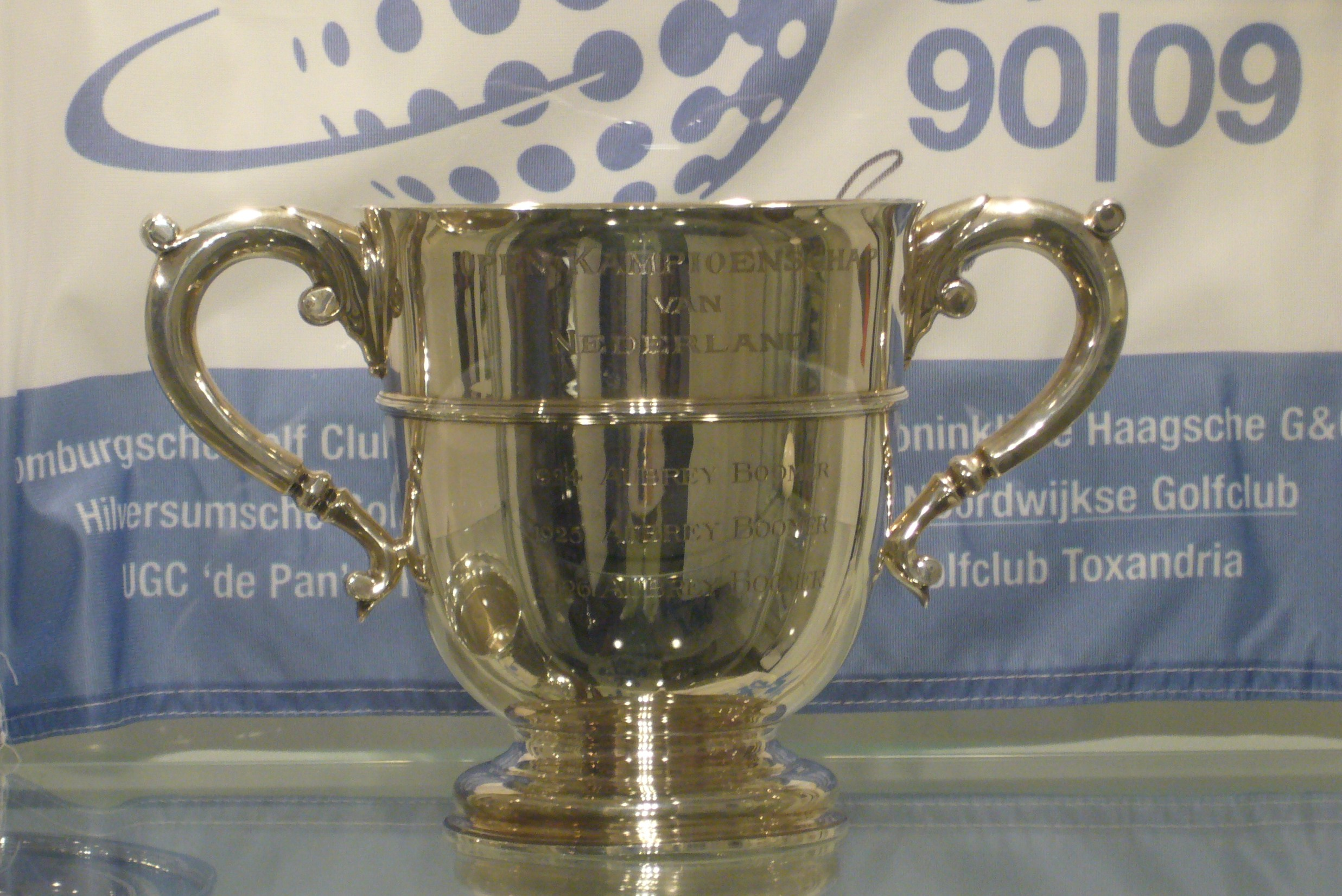
Original Trophy

Founded in 1912, the tournament began as the Dutch Open, before a variety of sponsors resulted in numerous name changes over the years. KLM was the longest title sponsor; lasting from 1981 to 1990, from 2004 to 2020, and from 2023 to recent. The tournament has been moved around the golfing calendar, but since 2010 it has been held in early September.

The event was cancelled in 2020 for the first time since 1945 due to the COVID-19 pandemic.

The event returned in 2021, with a new venue: Bernardus Golf in Cromvoirt. However the tournament name had been reverted back to the Dutch Open as KLM had decided to drop its title sponsorship duties. In 2023, after a short pause, KLM decided to lend its name back to the tournament.

Venue	Location	First	Last	Times
Royal Haagsche Golf & Country Club	The Hague	1912	1981	20
Noordwijkse Golf Club	Noordwijk	1916	2001	9
Doornsche Golf Club	Utrecht	1918	1918	1
Kennemer Golf & Country Club	Zandvoort	1920	2015	23
Domburgsche Golfclub	Domburg	1921	1921	1
Hilversumsche Golf Club	Hilversum	1923	2012	30
Utrechtse Golf Club 'De Pan'	Utrecht	1934	1982	3
Eindhovensche Golf	Eindhoven	1947	1970	6
Golfclub Toxandria	Breda	1950	1965	2
Rosendaelsche Golfclub	Arnhem	1984	1984	1
The Dutch	Spijk	2016	2018	3
The International	Amsterdam	2019	2026	4
Bernardus Golf	Cromvoirt	2021	2023	3

== Winners ==
Year	Winner	Score	To par	Margin of victory	Runner(s)-up	Venue
KLM Open
2026	(Spain) Eugenio Chacarra	273	−11	1 stroke	(Finland) Oliver Lindell	The International
2025	(Scotland) Connor Syme	273	−11	2 strokes	(Sweden) Joakim Lagergren	The International
2024	(Italy) Guido Migliozzi	273	−11	Playoff	(England) Joe Dean (Sweden) Marcus Kinhult	The International
2023	(Spain) Pablo Larrazábal	275	−13	2 strokes	(Spain) Adrián Otaegui	Bernardus Golf
Dutch Open
2022	(France) Victor Perez	275	−13	Playoff	(New Zealand) Ryan Fox	Bernardus Golf
2021	(Sweden) Kristoffer Broberg	265	−23	3 strokes	(Germany) Matti Schmid	Bernardus Golf
KLM Open
2020	Cancelled due to the COVID-19 pandemic					
2019	(Spain) Sergio García	270	−18	1 stroke	(Denmark) Nicolai Højgaard	The International
2018	(China) Wu Ashun	268	−16	1 stroke	(England) Chris Wood	The Dutch
2017	(France) Romain Wattel	269	−15	1 stroke	(Canada) Austin Connelly	The Dutch
2016	(Netherlands) Joost Luiten (2)	265	−19	3 strokes	(Austria) Bernd Wiesberger	The Dutch
2015	(Belgium) Thomas Pieters	261	−19	1 stroke	(Spain) Eduardo de la Riva (England) Lee Slattery	Kennemer
2014	(England) Paul Casey	266	−14	1 stroke	(England) Simon Dyson	Kennemer
2013	(Netherlands) Joost Luiten	268	−12	Playoff	(Spain) Miguel Ángel Jiménez	Kennemer
2012	(Sweden) Peter Hanson	266	−14	2 strokes	(Spain) Pablo Larrazábal (Scotland) Richie Ramsay	Hilversumsche
2011	(England) Simon Dyson (3)	268	−12	1 stroke	(England) David Lynn	Hilversumsche
2010	(Germany) Martin Kaymer	266	−14	4 strokes	(Sweden) Christian Nilsson (Paraguay) Fabrizio Zanotti	Hilversumsche
2009	(England) Simon Dyson (2)	265	−15	Playoff	(Sweden) Peter Hedblom (Republic of Ireland) Peter Lawrie	Kennemer
2008	(Northern Ireland) Darren Clarke	264	−16	4 strokes	(Republic of Ireland) Paul McGinley	Kennemer
2007	(England) Ross Fisher	268	−12	1 stroke	(Netherlands) Joost Luiten	Kennemer
2006	(England) Simon Dyson	270	−14	Playoff	(Australia) Richard Green	Kennemer
2005	(Spain) Gonzalo Fernández-Castaño	269	−11	2 strokes	(England) Gary Emerson	Hilversumsche
2004	(England) David Lynn	264	−16	3 strokes	(Australia) Richard Green (Republic of Ireland) Paul McGinley	Hilversumsche
Dutch Open
2003	(Netherlands) Maarten Lafeber	267	−13	1 stroke	(Sweden) Mathias Grönberg (Denmark) Søren Hansen	Hilversumsche
TNT Dutch Open
2002	(Germany) Tobias Dier	263	−17	1 stroke	(England) Jamie Spence	Hilversumsche
2001	(Germany) Bernhard Langer (3)	269	−15	Playoff	(England) Warren Bennett	Noordwijkse
2000	(Australia) Stephen Leaney (2)	269	−19	4 strokes	(Germany) Bernhard Langer	Noordwijkse
1999	(England) Lee Westwood	269	−15	1 stroke	(Scotland) Gary Orr	Hilversumsche
1998	(Australia) Stephen Leaney	266	−18	1 stroke	(Northern Ireland) Darren Clarke	Hilversumsche
Sun Microsystems Dutch Open
1997	(Germany) Sven Strüver	266	−18	3 strokes	(England) Russell Claydon	Hilversumsche
1996	(Zimbabwe) Mark McNulty	266	−18	1 stroke	(United States) Scott Hoch	Hilversumsche
Heineken Dutch Open
1995	(United States) Scott Hoch	269	−15	2 strokes	(Sweden) Michael Jonzon (Scotland) Sam Torrance	Hilversumsche
1994	(Spain) Miguel Ángel Jiménez	270	−18	2 strokes	(England) Howard Clark	Hilversumsche
1993	(Scotland) Colin Montgomerie	281	−7	1 stroke	(Argentina) José Cóceres (France) Jean van de Velde	Noordwijkse
1992	(Germany) Bernhard Langer (2)	277	−11	Playoff	(Scotland) Gordon Brand Jnr	Noordwijkse
1991	(United States) Payne Stewart	267	−21	9 strokes	(Sweden) Per-Ulrik Johansson (Germany) Bernhard Langer	Noordwijkse
KLM Dutch Open
1990	(Scotland) Stephen McAllister	274	−6	4 strokes	(England) Roger Chapman	Kennemer
1989	(Spain) José María Olazábal	277	−11	Playoff	(England) Roger Chapman (Northern Ireland) Ronan Rafferty	Kennemer
1988	(Wales) Mark Mouland	274	−14	1 stroke	(Republic of Ireland) Des Smyth	Hilversumsche
1987	(Scotland) Gordon Brand Jnr	272	−16	1 stroke	(England) David J. Russell	Hilversumsche
1986	(Spain) Seve Ballesteros (3)	271	−17	8 strokes	(Spain) José Rivero	Noordwijkse
1985	(Australia) Graham Marsh (2)	282	−6	1 stroke	(West Germany) Bernhard Langer	Noordwijkse
1984	(West Germany) Bernhard Langer	275	−13	4 strokes	(Australia) Graham Marsh	Rosendaelsche
1983	(Scotland) Ken Brown	274	−14	1 stroke	(Spain) José María Cañizares (Australia) Vaughan Somers	Kennemer
1982	(England) Paul Way	276	−12	2 strokes	(Northern Ireland) David Feherty (Argentina) Vicente Fernández	De Pan
1981	(South Africa) Harold Henning	280	−8	1 stroke	(United States) Raymond Floyd (Zimbabwe) Nick Price	Haagsche
Dutch Open
1980	(Spain) Seve Ballesteros (2)	280	−8	3 strokes	(Scotland) Sandy Lyle	Hilversumsche
1979	(Australia) Graham Marsh	285	−3	1 stroke	(Spain) Antonio Garrido (England) Malcolm Gregson	Noordwijkse
1978	(United States) Bob Byman (2)	214 (Note: Shortened to 54 holes due to a player controversy.)	−2	1 stroke	(Zimbabwe) Nick Price	Noordwijkse
1977	(United States) Bob Byman	278	−10	1 stroke	(South Africa) Hugh Baiocchi	Kennemer
1976	(Spain) Seve Ballesteros	275	−13	8 strokes	(England) Howard Clark	Kennemer
1975	(South Africa) Hugh Baiocchi	279	−9	2 strokes	(South Africa) Dale Hayes (Rhodesia) Simon Hobday	Hilversumsche
1974	(Scotland) Brian Barnes	211 (Note: Shortened to 54 holes due to rain.)	−5	5 strokes	(England) Peter Oosterhuis (Northern Ireland) Eddie Polland (New Zealand) Simon Owen	Hilversumsche
1973	(England) Doug McClelland	279	−9	1 stroke	(England) Peter Oosterhuis	Haagsche
1972	(Australia) Jack Newton	277	−11	1 stroke	(England) Peter Oosterhuis (England) Malcolm Gregson	Haagsche
1971	(Spain) Ramón Sota (2)	277		6 strokes	(Australia) Graham Marsh	Kennemer
1970	(Argentina) Vicente Fernández	279		6 strokes	(West Germany) Toni Kugelmüller	Eindhovensche
1969	(England) Guy Wolstenholme	277		5 strokes	(South Africa) Barry Franklin	Hilversumsche
1968	(England) John Cockin	292		Playoff	(Spain) Ángel Gallardo (Australia) Bob Shaw	Hilversumsche
1967	(England) Peter Townsend	282		1 stroke	(South Africa) Sewsunker Sewgolum	Haagsche
1966	(Spain) Ramón Sota	277		1 stroke	(South Africa) Allan Henning	Kennemer
1965	(Spain) Ángel Miguel	278		Playoff	(Spain) Jaime Benito	Toxandria
1964	(South Africa) Sewsunker Sewgolum (3)	275		3 strokes	(Australia) Ted Ball	Eindhovensche
1963	(South Africa) Retief Waltman	279		1 stroke	(Wales) Brian Huggett	Haagsche
1962	(Wales) Brian Huggett	274		2 strokes	(Netherlands) Gerard de Wit	Hilversumsche
1961	(South Africa) Brian Wilkes	279		2 strokes	(Wales) Brian Huggett	Kennemer
1960	(South Africa) Sewsunker Sewgolum (2)	280		3 strokes	(South Africa) Denis Hutchinson	Eindhovensche
1959	(South Africa) Sewsunker Sewgolum	283		1 stroke	(Netherlands) Gerard de Wit	Haagsche
1958	(Wales) Dave Thomas	277		3 strokes	(Argentina) Antonio Cerdá	Kennemer
1957	(England) John Jacobs	284		3 strokes	(Belgium) Flory Van Donck	Hilversumsche
1956	(Argentina) Antonio Cerdá	277		5 strokes	(Netherlands) Gerard de Wit	Eindhovensche
1955	(Italy) Alfonso Angelini	280		Playoff	(Netherlands) Gerard de Wit	Kennemer
1954	(Italy) Ugo Grappasonni	295		Playoff	(Netherlands) Gerard de Wit	Haagsche
1953	(Belgium) Flory Van Donck (5)	286		2 strokes	(Netherlands) Piet Witte	Eindhovensche
1952	(England) Cecil Denny (2)	284		1 stroke	(Italy) Aldo Casera	Hilversumsche
1951	(Belgium) Flory Van Donck (4)	281		2 strokes	(Scotland) Eric Brown (England) Reg Horne	Kennemer
1950	(Argentina) Roberto De Vicenzo	269		14 strokes	(Scotland) Eric Brown (Argentina) John Cruickshank	Toxandria
1949	(Scotland) Jimmy Adams	294		5 strokes	(England) Max Faulkner	Haagsche
1948	(England) Cecil Denny	290		3 strokes	(Netherlands) Joop Rühl	Hilversumsche
1947	(Netherlands) Joop Rühl	290		3 strokes	(Scotland) Willie Forrester	Eindhovensche
1946	(Belgium) Flory Van Donck (3)	290		8 strokes	(Netherlands) Joop Rühl	Hilversumsche
1940–1945: No tournament due to World War II
1939	(South Africa) Bobby Locke	281		6 strokes	(England) Cecil Denny	Kennemer
1938	(England) Alf Padgham	281		3 strokes	(England) Cecil Denny	Haagsche
1937	(Belgium) Flory Van Donck (2)	286		2 strokes	(France) Auguste Boyer	De Pan
1936	(Belgium) Flory Van Donck	285		4 strokes	(England) Francis Francis (a)	Hilversumsche
1935	(South Africa) Sid Brews (2)	275		10 strokes	(France) Marcel Dallemagne	Kennemer
1934	(South Africa) Sid Brews	286		1 stroke	(England) Cecil Denny	De Pan
1933	(France) Marcel Dallemagne	143		6 strokes	(France) Auguste Boyer	Kennemer
1932	(France) Auguste Boyer	137		4 strokes	(France) Julien Orengo	Haagsche
1931	(United States) Frank Dyer	145		5 strokes	(England) Tom Odams	Kennemer
1930	(Netherlands) Dirk Oosterveer (2)	152		2 strokes	(Netherlands) Jos van Dijk	Haagsche
1929	(England) Jack Taylor	153		1 stroke	(Wales) Bert Hodson	Hilversumsche
1928	(England) Ernest Whitcombe	141		6 strokes	(England) Charles Whitcombe	Haagsche
1927	(Jersey) Percy Boomer	147		1 stroke	(England) Henry Cotton	Haagsche
1926	(Jersey) Aubrey Boomer (3)	151		5 strokes	(Jersey) Percy Boomer (Netherlands) Jos van Dijk	Haagsche
1925	(Jersey) Aubrey Boomer (2)	144		8 strokes	(England) Percy Alliss	Haagsche
1924	(Jersey) Aubrey Boomer	138		14 strokes	(England) George Pannell	Haagsche
1923	(England) Henry Burrows (3)	153		1 stroke	(Scotland) James Paxton Jr. (Northern Ireland) Donald Soulby (a) (Netherlands) Jos van Dijk	Hilversumsche
1922	(England) George Pannell (2)	160		3 strokes	(Netherlands) Jos van Dijk	Noordwijkse
1921	(England) Henry Burrows (2)	158		4 strokes	(Netherlands) Dirk Oosterveer	Domburgsche
1920	(England) Henry Burrows	151		Playoff	(Netherlands) Jacob Oosterveer	Kennemer
1919	(Netherlands) Dirk Oosterveer	158		6 strokes	(Netherlands) Jacob Oosterveer	Haagsche
1918	(Belgium) Florent Gevers (a)	159		1 stroke	(England) Henry Burrows	Doornsche
1917	(Netherlands) Jacob Oosterveer	160		2 strokes	(Netherlands) Gerry del Court van Krimpen (a)	Haagsche
1916	(England) Charles Bryce (a)	166		7 strokes	(Netherlands) Gerry del Court van Krimpen (a) (Netherlands) Jacob Oosterveer	Noordwijkse
1915	(Netherlands) Gerry del Court van Krimpen (a)	152		12 strokes	(England) Henry Burrows (England) Ernest Kettley	Haagsche
1913–14: No tournament
1912	(England) George Pannell	158		1 stroke	(England) Charles Warren	Haagsche

== See also ==
- Open golf tournament
