= Belgian Open =

Belgian Open can refer to:

- Belgian Open (golf)
- Belgian Open (tennis)
