= Llandudno International Golf Trophy =

Tournament information
- Location: Llandudno, Wales
- Established: 1938
- Course(s): Maesdu Golf Club
- Format: Team match play
- Month played: September
- Final year: 1938

Final champion
- England

The Llandudno International Golf Trophy was a professional team match play golf tournament that was played at the Maesdu Golf Club from 28 to 30 September 1938. The tournament was contested between England, Scotland, Ireland and Wales. It was intended to be the first of a series of matches but the Second World War interrupted these plans and the contests were not restarted after the war. England won the tournament by winning all their three matches against the other teams.

The Maesdu Golf Club joined with the local Llandudno council to stage the tournament with the idea of promoting tourism in the area.

A Triangular Professional Tournament with a similar format but involving only Scotland, Ireland and Wales had been contested at Cawder Golf Club near Glasgow from 21 to 23 October 1937. This was won by Scotland with Wales second and Ireland third.

The concept of a professional home nations contest was tried again in 1967 with the R.T.V. International Trophy.

== Trophy ==
Llandudno council presented a silver trophy to the P.G.A. for the winning team. Percy Alliss, the captain of the English team, took possession of the trophy. During Alliss's later years, the trophy was returned to the P.G.A. and was then used as the trophy for the PGA Cup which started in 1973.

== Format ==
The tournament was played over three days with each team playing the other three. There were 5 foursomes matches in the morning and 10 singles in the afternoon. All matches were over 18 holes.

== Teams ==
The following played in at least one match:

- England: Percy Alliss (Captain), Freddie Beck, Dick Burton, Don Curtis, Bert Gadd, Sam King, Arthur Lacey, Arthur Lees, Alf Padgham, Eddie Whitcombe
- Scotland: Jimmy Adams (Captain), Hamish Ballingall, William Davis, Allan Dailey, Tom Dobson, Sydney Fairweather, John Fallon, Tom Haliburton, Willie Hastings, George Hutton, Gregor McIntosh
- Ireland: Paddy Mahon (Captain), Harry Bradshaw, Joe Carroll, Fred Daly, Joe Edgar, Willie Holley, Bill Kinsella, Joe McCartney, John McKenna, Willie Nolan, Philip Stevenson
- Wales: Tom Jones (Captain), Chris Grabham, Tom Green, Fred Healing, Frank Hill, Bert Hodson, D. C. Jones, Fred Lloyd, Charles Pickett, Dai Rees, Ken Williams

Tom Green had played for England in the 1935 England–Scotland Professional Match.

== Results ==
=== Matches ===
Wednesday 28 September

Team	Score	Team	Score	Halved
Scotland	9	(Republic of Ireland) Ireland	4	2
England	10	Wales	4	1

Thursday 29 September

Team	Score	Team	Score	Halved
England	11	(Republic of Ireland) Ireland	3	1
Scotland	9	Wales	5	1

Friday 30 September

Team	Score	Team	Score	Halved
England	11	Scotland	4	0
(Republic of Ireland) Ireland	6	Wales	5	4

=== Final table ===
Team	Matches		Individual games		
Team	Won	Lost	Won	Lost	Halved
England	3	0	32	11	2
Scotland	2	1	22	20	3
(Republic of Ireland) Ireland	1	2	13	25	7
Wales	0	3	14	25	6
