= Henry Cotton (golfer) =

English professional golfer (1907–1987)

Sir Henry Cotton MBE
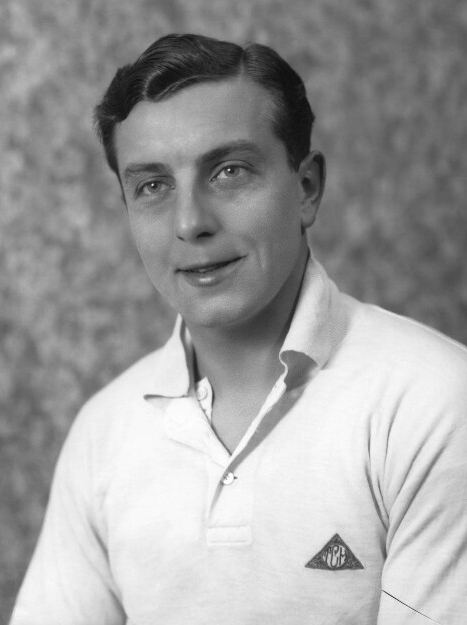
- Cotton in 1931

Personal information
- Full name: Thomas Henry Cotton
- Nationality: England
- Born: 28 January 1907 Holmes Chapel, Cheshire, England
- Died: 22 December 1987 (aged 80) London, England

Career
- Sport: Golf
- Turned professional: 1924
- Professional wins: 37

Best results in major championships (wins: 3)
- Masters Tournament: T13: 1957
- PGA Championship: DNP
- U.S. Open: T17: 1956
- The Open Championship: Won: 1934, 1937, 1948

Achievements and awards
- World Golf Hall of Fame: 1980 (member page)
- Harry Vardon Trophy: 1938
- Member of the Order of the British Empire: 1946
- Knight Bachelor: 1988

Sir Thomas Henry Cotton, MBE (28 January 1907 – 22 December 1987) was an English professional golfer. He won the Open Championship in 1934, 1937 and 1948, becoming the leading British player of his generation.

== Early life ==
Cotton was born in Holmes Chapel, then known as Church Hulme, near Congleton, Cheshire on 28 January 1907. He had an older brother, Leslie (born 1905), who also became a professional golfer. Cotton was brought up in Crystal Palace Road, East Dulwich, London. He later went to Reigate Grammar School, and then won a scholarship to Alleyn's School in Dulwich, South London. He was a useful cricketer, good enough to bat at number 3 for the school against Surrey Club and Ground, a team containing 5 professionals, at the age of 15. Cotton and his brother had already taken up a second sport, golf, at the Aquarius Golf Club in Honor Oak from 1920. In September 1921 the Cotton brothers played in the first Boys Amateur Championship, then limited to boys under 16. Henry played the eventual winner, Donald Mathieson, on the first day, losing by 2 holes, Cotton was all square after 16 holes but lost the 17th after being incorrectly penalised for placing his bag in a bunker. Cotton also played in the 1922 Boys Championship, again losing in the first round. In June 1923 Cotton won the Hutchings Trophy, the Championship of the Aquarius Club.

== Career ==
Cotton left school in the summer of 1923 and soon started his career as a professional golfer, joining his older brother Leslie as assistant teaching professional at Fulwell Golf Club under Fulwell's professional, George Oke, who had been at Honor Oak since 1921. Within a year Cotton had left and become an assistant at Rye Golf Club near Rye, East Sussex. During his time at Rye, Cotton travelled to Scotland to try to qualify for the 1925 Open Championship. However scores of 85 and 82 left him well outside the qualifying mark of 158. In March 1926, aged 19, he became the professional at Langley Park Golf Club near Beckenham in Kent, replacing Frank Ball who emigrated to America later the same year.

Cotton remained at Langley Park until the end of 1932 when he moved to the Waterloo Golf Club near Brussels, Belgium. While there, Cotton improved his game and by the time he left he was one of Britain's leading golfers. In 1926, Cotton again failed to qualifying for the Open Championship but later in the year qualified for the knock-out stages of the Yorkshire Evening News Tournament and the News of the World Match Play and ended the season by winning the Kent Professional Championship.

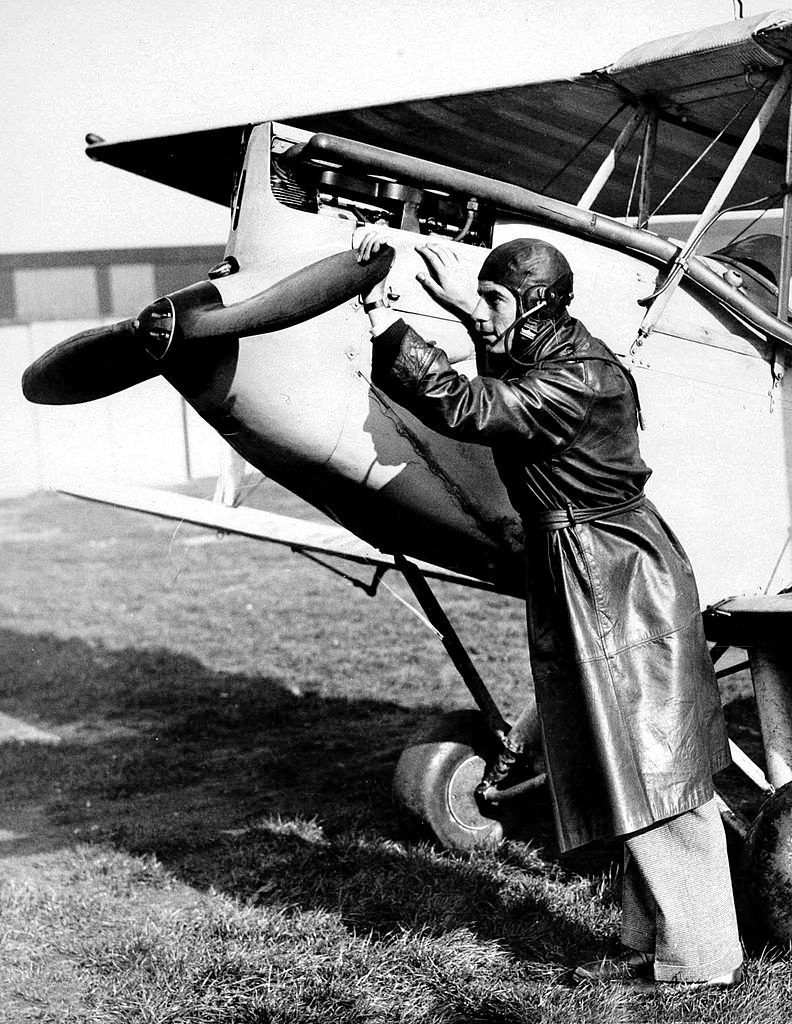
Cotton training as a pilot at Croydon Airport in 1930

He achieved fame during the 1930s and 1940s, with three victories in The Open Championship (1934, 1937, and 1948). His record round of 65, made during the 1934 Open Championship, led to the Dunlop golf company issuing the famous 'Dunlop 65' ball. Cotton placed 17 times in the top-10 at the Open. Cotton also succeeded in winning many titles on the European circuit during the 1930s. During this period he was a professional at the Ashridge Golf Club.

Cotton was trained as a pilot since at least 1930. During World War II he served with the Royal Air Force, and raised money for the Red Cross by playing exhibition matches and shows. This earned him an MBE. At this time he was stationed at RAF Halton and was closely involved with what is now the Chiltern Forest Golf club. He added three holes to the course (taking it from six to nine) and made other improvements.

Cotton was a playing member of three British Ryder Cup teams, in 1929, 1937 and 1947, serving as captain of the team in 1947, and was a non-playing captain in 1953. He competed only occasionally in the United States, without notable success.

== Personal life and retirement ==
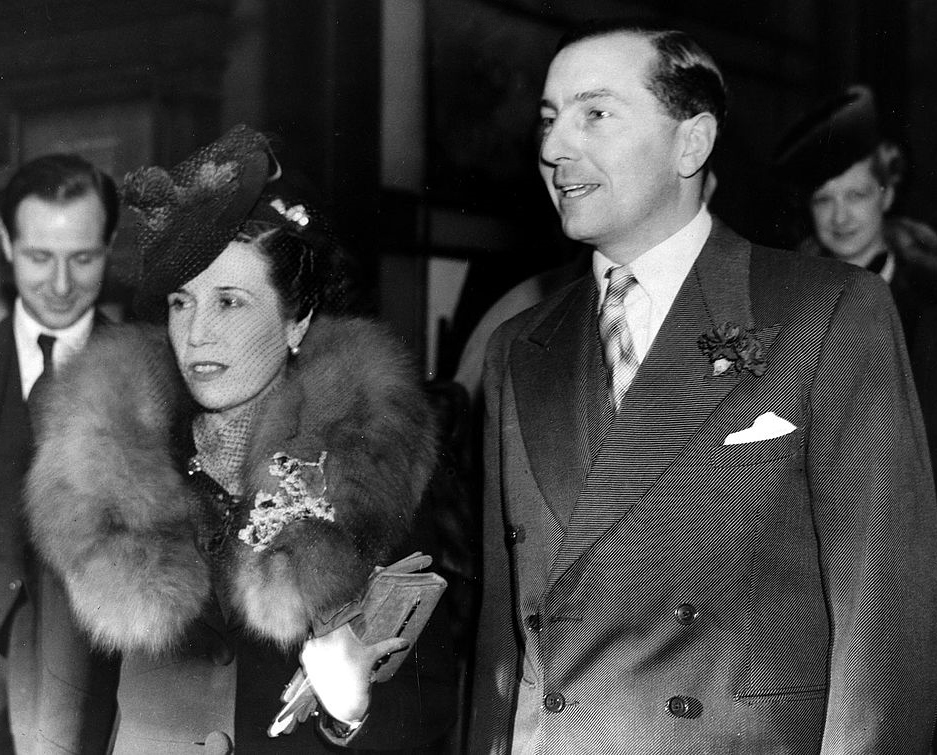
Cotton and Toots were married on 11 December 1939

On 11 December 1939 Cotton married Isabel-Maria Estanguet de Moss, the daughter of a Buenos Aires beef merchant, who was taking golf lessons from Cotton and was known by her nickname 'Toots'. She supported Cotton during his golf competitions and directly influenced the way he would dress for them.

Following his retirement from competitive golf in the early 1950s, Cotton became a successful architect of golf courses, including designing the Penina Golf and Resort and Pestana Alto Golf on the Algarve, Portugal. He was hired by Baron Edmond Adolphe de Rothschild to design the golf course in Megève, Haute-Savoie, France. Cotton wrote 10 books, and established the Golf Foundation, which helped thousands of young boys and girls get started in golf.

Cotton loved the high life, including champagne and bespoke tailored clothes. He lived for a while in a suite in a 5-star hotel, and later bought an estate complete with butler and full staff, traveling everywhere in a Rolls-Royce. Cotton stated in his book "This Game Of Golf" that his hero was Walter Hagen, who was a flashy dresser and a high-roller. Cotton marvelled at how Hagen would stay up all night playing cards for money on the eve of a tournament, and then go straight to the first tee without even warming up beforehand..

Cotton was inducted into the World Golf Hall of Fame in 1980. He was knighted in the New Year's Day Honours of 1988, named a Knight Bachelor. This was reported in some media as a "posthumous knighthood" because he had died by the time it was publicly announced. However, the Queen had approved the award and he had accepted it before his death.

== Awards and honors ==
- In 1938, he earned the Harry Vardon Trophy, awarded to the lowest average scorer on the British PGA
- In 1946, he was honored as a Member of the Order of the British Empire
- In 1980, Cotton was inducted into the World Golf Hall of Fame
- In 1988, he was bestowed the title of knight at New Year's Day Honours of 1988
- The Rookie of the Year award for the European Tour is named after him

== Professional wins (37) ==
=== PGA Tour wins (1) ===
| | Date | Tournament | Winning score | Margin of victory | Runner(s)-up |
|---|---|---|---|---|---|
| 1. | Jul 2, 1948 | The Open Championship | 71-66-75-72=284 | 5 strokes | (Northern Ireland) Fred Daly |

=== British PGA circuit wins (19) ===
| | Date | Tournament | Winning score | Margin of victory | Runner(s)-up |
|---|---|---|---|---|---|
| 1. | 15 May 1931 | Dunlop-Southport Tournament | 70-77-68-72=287 | 2 strokes | (England) Archie Compston |
| 2. | 14 May 1932 | Dunlop-Southport Tournament | 68-69-72-72=281 | Playoff | (England) Bill Twine |
| 3. | 23 Sep 1932 | News of the World Match Play | 10 & 8 in final | | (England) Alf Perry |
| 4. | 29 Jun 1934 | The Open Championship | 67-65-72-79=283 | 5 strokes | (South Africa) Sid Brews |
| 5. | 8 Jun 1935 | Yorkshire Evening News Tournament | 3 & 2 in final | | (England) Percy Alliss |
| 6. | 24 Sep 1936 | Dunlop-Metropolitan Tournament | 72-68-70-71=281 | 3 strokes | (England) Arthur Lacey, (England) Reg Whitcombe |
| 7. | 23 Apr 1937 | Silver King Tournament | 73-68-70-68=279 | 1 stroke | (Republic of Ireland) Paddy Mahon |
| 8. | 9 Jul 1937 | The Open Championship | 74-72-73-71=290 | 2 strokes | (England) Reg Whitcombe |
| 9. | 1 Apr 1939 | Daily Mail Tournament | 69-75-77-71=292 | Playoff | (England) Archie Compston |
| 10. | 17 Jun 1939 | Penfold Professional Golf League | 18 points | Tie | (England) Charles Whitcombe |
| 11. | 3 May 1940 | News of the World Match Play | 37th hole in final | | (England) Alf Padgham |
| 12. | 24 Aug 1945 | News Chronicle Tournament | 74-77-76-74=301 | 4 strokes | (England) Percy Alliss, (England) Arthur Havers |
| 13. | 27 Apr 1946 | The Star Tournament | 4 & 3 in final | | (England) Arthur Lees |
| 14. | 28 Sep 1946 | News of the World Match Play | 8 & 7 in final | | (Scotland) Jimmy Adams |
| 15. | 6 Jun 1947 | Spalding Tournament | 74-69-71-74=288 | 5 strokes | (Wales) Dai Rees |
| 16. | 13 Jun 1947 | Yorkshire Evening News Tournament | 66-72-70-69=277 | Tie | (Australia) Norman Von Nida |
| 17. | 2 Jul 1948 | The Open Championship | 71-66-75-72=284 | 5 strokes | (Northern Ireland) Fred Daly |
| 18. | 13 Jun 1953 | Dunlop Tournament | 72-65-70-72-74=353 | 5 strokes | (Wales) Dai Rees |
| 19. | 22 May 1954 | Penfold Tournament | 5 & 4 in final | | (England) John Jacobs |

=== Continental wins (11) ===
| | Date | Tournament | Winning score | Margin of victory | Runner(s)-up |
|---|---|---|---|---|---|
| 1. | 29 Jun 1930 | Belgian Open | 73-68-74-66=281 | 11 strokes | (England) Archie Compston |
| 2. | 14 Aug 1934 | Belgian Open | 67-71-73-68=279 | 3 strokes | (England) Percy Alliss |
| 3. | 3 Aug 1936 | Italian Open | 68-67-67-66=268 | 6 strokes | (United States) Joe Ezar |
| 4. | 15 Aug 1937 | German Open | 63-70-69-72=274 | 17 strokes | (France) Auguste Boyer |
| 5. | 21 Aug 1937 | Czechoslovak Open | 70-72-69-68=279 | 5 strokes | (England) Arthur Lees |
| 6. | 13 Jul 1938 | Belgian Open | 66-70-69-72=277 | 13 strokes | (England) Arthur Lacey |
| 7. | 21 Aug 1938 | German Open | 71-68-70-76=285 | 15 strokes | (England) Arthur Lees |
| 8. | 26 Aug 1938 | Czechoslovak Open | 71-67-72-72=282 | 11 strokes | (Scotland) Bill Laidlaw |
| 9. | 20 Aug 1939 | German Open | 67-71-72-70=280 | 11 strokes | (Germany) Georg Bessner |
| 10. | 11 Jul 1946 | French Open | 70-66-67-66=269 | 15 strokes | (Belgium) Flory Van Donck |
| 11. | 16 Jul 1947 | French Open | 68-71-73-73=285 | 3 strokes | (England) John Knipe |

=== Other wins (7) ===
Note: This list may be incomplete.

- 1926 Kent Professional Championship
- 1927 Kent Professional Championship
- 1928 Kent Professional Championship
- 1929 Kent Professional Championship
- 1930 South Open (Argentina), Kent Professional Championship
- 1948 White Sulphur Springs Tournament (USA)

== Major championships ==
=== Wins (3) ===
| Year | Championship | 54 holes | Winning score | Margin | Runner-up |
|---|---|---|---|---|---|
| 1934 | The Open Championship | 10 shot lead | 67-65-72-79=283 | 5 strokes | (South Africa) Sid Brews |
| 1937 | The Open Championship (2) | 3 shot deficit | 74-72-73-71=290 | 2 strokes | (England) Reg Whitcombe |
| 1948 | The Open Championship (3) | 2 shot lead | 71-66-75-72=284 | 5 strokes | (Northern Ireland) Fred Daly |

=== Results timeline ===
| Tournament | 1927 | 1928 | 1929 |
|---|---|---|---|
| Masters Tournament | NYF | NYF | NYF |
| U.S. Open | | | |
| The Open Championship | 9 | T18 | T32 |

| Tournament | 1930 | 1931 | 1932 | 1933 | 1934 | 1935 | 1936 | 1937 | 1938 | 1939 |
|---|---|---|---|---|---|---|---|---|---|---|
| Masters Tournament | NYF | NYF | NYF | NYF | | | | | | |
| U.S. Open | | CUT | | | | | | | | |
| The Open Championship | 8 | T10 | T10 | T7 | 1 | T7 | T3 | 1 | 3 | T13 |

| Tournament | 1940 | 1941 | 1942 | 1943 | 1944 | 1945 | 1946 | 1947 | 1948 | 1949 |
|---|---|---|---|---|---|---|---|---|---|---|
| Masters Tournament | | | | NT | NT | NT | | | T25 | |
| U.S. Open | | | NT | NT | NT | NT | | | | |
| The Open Championship | NT | NT | NT | NT | NT | NT | T4 | T6 | 1 | |

| Tournament | 1950 | 1951 | 1952 | 1953 | 1954 | 1955 | 1956 | 1957 | 1958 | 1959 |
|---|---|---|---|---|---|---|---|---|---|---|
| Masters Tournament | | | | | | | T68 | T13 | | |
| U.S. Open | | | | | | | T17 | | | |
| The Open Championship | | | 4 | | CUT | T32 | T6 | T9 | T8 | T41 |

| Tournament | 1960 | 1961 | 1962 | 1963 | 1964 | 1965 | 1966 | 1967 | 1968 | 1969 |
|---|---|---|---|---|---|---|---|---|---|---|
| Masters Tournament | | | | | | | | | | |
| U.S. Open | | | | | | | | | | |
| The Open Championship | | T32 | | | | | | | | |

| Tournament | 1970 | 1971 | 1972 | 1973 | 1974 | 1975 | 1976 | 1977 |
|---|---|---|---|---|---|---|---|---|
| Masters Tournament | | | | | | | | |
| U.S. Open | | | | | | | | |
| The Open Championship | | | | | | | | CUT |

Note: Cotton never played in the PGA Championship.

Win
Top 10
Did not play

NYF = Tournament not yet founded
NT = No tournament
CUT = missed the half-way cut
"T" indicates a tie for a place

== Team appearances ==
- Ryder Cup (representing Great Britain): 1929 (winners), 1937, 1947 (captain), 1953 (non-playing captain)
- Seniors vs Juniors (representing the Juniors): 1928
- France–Great Britain Professional Match (representing Great Britain): 1929 (winners)
- Coronation Match (representing the Ladies and Professionals): 1937
- Joy Cup (representing the British Isles): 1954 (winners, captain), 1955 (winners, non-playing captain), 1956 (winners, captain)

== Gallery ==
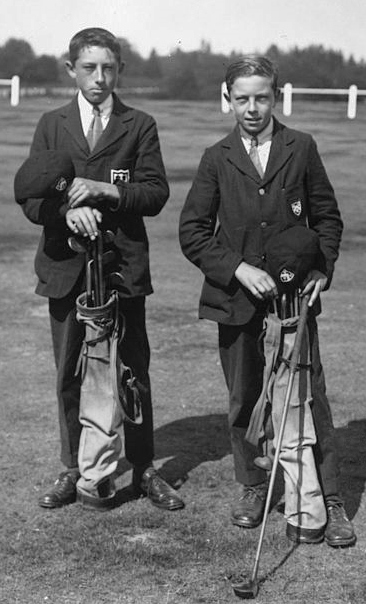
Leslie and Henry Cotton (right) at a Boys Golf Championship in 1921

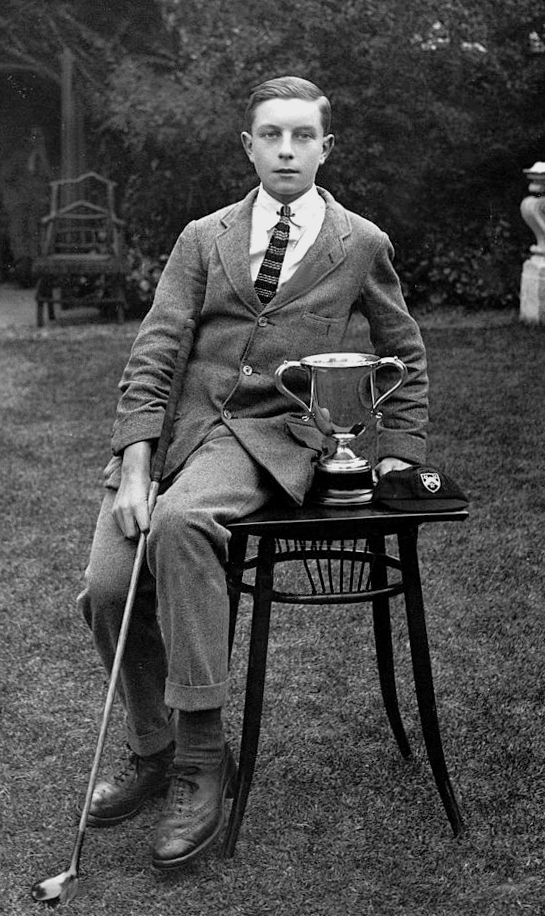
Cotton after winning the Pilling Challenge Cup in 1923

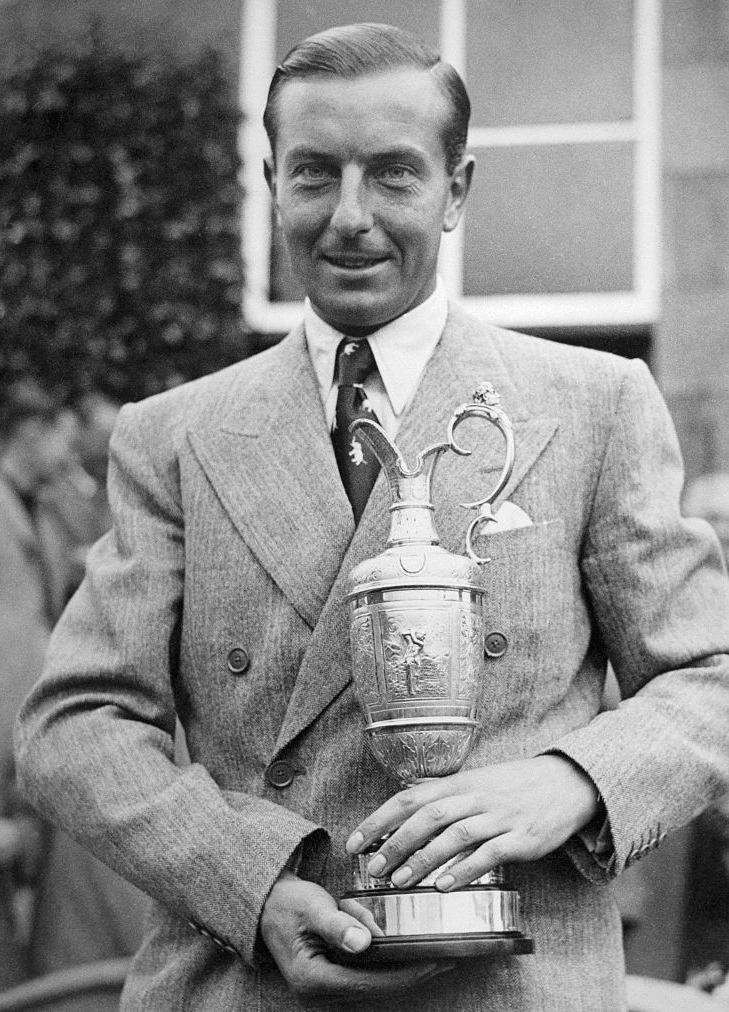
Cotton after winning the Open in Carnoustie in 1937
