= Italian Open (golf) =

Men's professional golf tournament in Italy

Coordinates: 45.409°N 10.595°E

DS Automobiles Open d'Italia

Tournament information
- Location: Turin, Italy
- Established: 1925
- Course: Circolo Golf Torino
- Par: 71
- Length: 7,214 yards (6,596 m)
- Tour: European Tour
- Format: Stroke play
- Prize fund: US$3,000,000
- Month played: June

Tournament record score
- Aggregate: 260 Eugenio Chacarra (2026)
- To par: −25 Hennie Otto (2008)

Current champion
- (Spain) Eugenio Chacarra

Location map
- Location in Italy Location in Piedmont

The Italian Open (Italian: Open d'Italia) is the men's national open golf championship of Italy. It was founded in 1925 and, except for 1933 and during World War II, was played annually until 1960. After an eleven-year hiatus, it returned in 1971 when it was one of five tournaments in Continental Europe that were included on the British PGA Order of Merit circuit. The following year of that circuit has since been recognised as the first official season of the European Tour, and the Italian Open is one of few tournaments that have featured on the schedule every year. The 2018 event was the 75th edition of the championship.

In 2017 the European Tour created the Rolex Series, a group of events with higher prize money, with the Italian Open being one of the designated events with total prize money increased to US$7 million, more than double that of the previous year. In 2020 the tournament was not part of the Rolex Series, having been rescheduled with much lower prize money due to the impact of the COVID-19 pandemic.

== History ==
In 1935, British golfer Percy Alliss scored a 262 aggregate on his way to winning the event. He established the lowest 72-hole total ever in any golf tournament ever at the time. The legitimacy of the record was in doubt, according to Time, as the length of the San Remo course was only 5,200 yards, far below the international "championship standard." Many decades later, in 2008, South African Hennie Otto was just one stroke away from Alliss' total, still the tournament record.

== Venues ==
Venue	Location	First	Last	Times
Golf Club Alpino di Stresa	Stresa	1925	1927	3
Circolo Golf Villa d'Este	Montorfano	1928	1972	12
Circolo Golf degli Ulivi, Sanremo	Sanremo	1934	1948	5
Sestrieres Golf Club	Sestriere	1936	1936	1
Circolo del Golf Roma, Acquasanta	Rome	1950	1980	3
Golf Club Milano	Monza	1951	2017	9
Circolo Golf Venezia	Venice	1955	1974	3
Golf Club Varese	Varese	1958	1958	1
Golf Club Garlenda	Garlenda	1971	1971	1
Olgiata Golf Club	Rome	1973	2019	2 (+1)
Golf Club Monticello	Como	1975	1992	7
Circolo Golf Is Molas	Pula, Sardinia	1976	2001	4
Pevero Golf Club	Arzachena, Sardinia	1978	1978	1
Circolo Golf Ugolino	Florence	1983	1983	1
Molinetto Country Club	Milan	1985	1985	1
Golf Club Albarella	Venice	1986	1986	1
Castelconturbia Golf Club	Borgomanero	1991	1998	2
Modena Golf and Country Club	Modena	1993	1993	1
Marco Simone Golf and Country Club	Rome	1994	2022	4
Le Rovedine Golf Club	Milan	1995	1995	1
Golf Club Bergamo "L'Albenza"	Bergamo	1996	1996	1
Gardagolf Country Club	Brescia	1997	2018	3
Circolo Golf Torino "La Mandria"	Turin	1999	2026	4
Golf Club Castello Tolcinasco	Milan	2004	2008	5
Royal Park i Roveri	Turin	2009	2012	4
Chervò Golf Hotel and Spa Resort	Pozzolengo	2020	2020	1
Adriatic Golf Club Cervia	Cervia	2024	2024	1
Argentario Golf Club	Monte Argentario	2025	2025	1

In 1973 the first two rounds were played on two different courses, Acquasanta and Olgiata, everyone playing one round on each course. After the cut, Acquasanta was then used for the final two rounds.

== Winners ==
European Tour (Rolex Series)	2017–2019
European Tour (Regular)	1972–2016, 2020–
Pre-European Tour	1925–1971

#	Year	Winner	Score	To par	Margin of victory	Runner(s)-up	Venue	Ref.
DS Automobiles Open d'Italia
83rd	2026	(Spain) Eugenio Chacarra	260	−24	5 strokes	(England) Matt Wallace	Torino	
Italian Open
82nd	2025	(France) Adrien Saddier	266	−14	2 strokes	(France) Martin Couvra	Argentario	
81st	2024	(Germany) Marcel Siem	274	−10	Playoff	(Northern Ireland) Tom McKibbin	Adriatic	
DS Automobiles Italian Open
80th	2023	(Poland) Adrian Meronk	271	−13	1 stroke	(France) Romain Langasque	Marco Simone	
79th	2022	(Scotland) Robert MacIntyre	270	−14	Playoff	(England) Matt Fitzpatrick	Marco Simone	
78th	2021	(Denmark) Nicolai Højgaard	271	−13	1 stroke	(England) Tommy Fleetwood (Poland) Adrian Meronk	Marco Simone	
Italian Open
77th (Note: The 2020 tournament was originally scheduled as a Rolex Series event but was downgraded as a result of rescheduling with a reduced prize fund due to the COVID-19 pandemic.)	2020	(England) Ross McGowan	268	−20	1 stroke	(England) Laurie Canter (Belgium) Nicolas Colsaerts	Chervò	
76th	2019	(Austria) Bernd Wiesberger	268	−16	1 stroke	(England) Matt Fitzpatrick	Olgiata	
75th	2018	(Denmark) Thorbjørn Olesen	262	−22	1 stroke	(Italy) Francesco Molinari	Gardagolf	
74th	2017	(England) Tyrrell Hatton	263	−21	1 stroke	(Thailand) Kiradech Aphibarnrat (England) Ross Fisher	Milano	
73rd	2016	(Italy) Francesco Molinari (2)	262	−22	1 stroke	(England) Danny Willett	Milano	
Open d'Italia
72nd	2015	(Sweden) Rikard Karlberg	269	−19	Playoff	(Germany) Martin Kaymer	Milano	
71st	2014	(South Africa) Hennie Otto (2)	268	−20	2 strokes	(England) David Howell	Torino	
Open d'Italia Lindt
70th	2013	(France) Julien Quesne	276	−12	1 stroke	(Republic of Ireland) David Higgins (England) Steve Webster	Torino	
BMW Italian Open
69th	2012	(Spain) Gonzalo Fernández-Castaño (2)	264	−24	2 strokes	(South Africa) Garth Mulroy	Royal Park i Roveri	
68th	2011	(England) Robert Rock	267	−21	1 stroke	(England) Gary Boyd (Denmark) Thorbjørn Olesen	Royal Park i Roveri	
67th	2010	(Sweden) Fredrik Andersson Hed	268	−16	2 strokes	(England) David Horsey	Royal Park i Roveri	
66th	2009	(Argentina) Daniel Vancsik	267	−17	6 strokes	(United States) John Daly (France) Raphaël Jacquelin (England) Robert Rock	Royal Park i Roveri	
Methorios Capital Italian Open
65th	2008	(South Africa) Hennie Otto	263	−25	1 stroke	(England) Oliver Wilson	Castello Tolcinasco	
Telecom Italia Open
64th	2007	(Spain) Gonzalo Fernández-Castaño	200 (Note: Shortened to 54 holes due to rain.)	−16	Playoff	(Austria) Markus Brier	Castello Tolcinasco	
63rd	2006	(Italy) Francesco Molinari	265	−23	4 strokes	(Denmark) Anders Hansen (Sweden) Jarmo Sandelin	Castello Tolcinasco	
62nd	2005	(England) Steve Webster	270	−18	3 strokes	(Wales) Bradley Dredge (England) Richard Finch (Denmark) Anders Hansen	Castello Tolcinasco	
61st	2004	(Northern Ireland) Graeme McDowell	197	−19	Playoff	(France) Thomas Levet	Castello Tolcinasco	
Italian Open Telecom Italia
60th	2003	(Sweden) Mathias Grönberg	271	−17	2 strokes	(Argentina) Ricardo González (Spain) José Manuel Lara (Scotland) Colin Montgomerie	Gardagolf	
59th	2002	(England) Ian Poulter (2)	197	−19	2 strokes	(Scotland) Paul Lawrie	Olgiata	
Atlanet Italian Open
58th	2001	(France) Grégory Havret	268	−20	1 stroke	(Wales) Bradley Dredge	Is Molas	
Italian Open
57th	2000	(England) Ian Poulter	267	−21	1 stroke	(Scotland) Gordon Brand Jnr	Is Molas	
Fiat and Fila Italian Open
56th	1999	(Scotland) Dean Robertson	271	−17	1 stroke	(Republic of Ireland) Pádraig Harrington	Torino	
Italian Open
55th	1998	(Sweden) Patrik Sjöland	195	−21	3 strokes	(Sweden) Joakim Haeggman (Spain) José María Olazábal	Castelconturbia	
Conte of Florence Italian Open
54th	1997	(Germany) Bernhard Langer (2)	273	−15	1 stroke	(Spain) José María Olazábal	Gardagolf	
53rd	1996	(England) Jim Payne	275	−9	1 stroke	(Sweden) Patrik Sjöland	Bergamo	
Italian Open
52nd	1995	(Scotland) Sam Torrance (2)	269	−19	2 strokes	(Spain) José Rivero	Le Rovedine	
Tisettanta Italian Open
51st	1994	(Argentina) Eduardo Romero	272	−16	1 stroke	(New Zealand) Greg Turner	Marco Simone	
Lancia Martini Italian Open
50th	1993	(New Zealand) Greg Turner	267	−21	1 stroke	(Argentina) José Cóceres	Modena	
49th	1992	(Scotland) Sandy Lyle (2)	270	−18	1 stroke	(Scotland) Colin Montgomerie	Monticello	
48th	1991	(Australia) Craig Parry	279	−9	1 stroke	(Wales) Ian Woosnam	Castelconturbia	
47th	1990	(England) Richard Boxall	267	−21	5 strokes	(Spain) José María Olazábal	Milano	
Lancia Italian Open
46th	1989	(Northern Ireland) Ronan Rafferty	273	−15	1 stroke	(Scotland) Sam Torrance	Monticello	
45th	1988	(Australia) Greg Norman	270	−18	1 stroke	(Australia) Craig Parry	Monticello	
44th	1987	(Scotland) Sam Torrance	271	−17	Playoff	(Spain) José Rivero	Monticello	
Italian Open
43rd	1986	(Northern Ireland) David Feherty	270	−10	Playoff	(Northern Ireland) Ronan Rafferty	Albarella	
42nd	1985	(Spain) Manuel Piñero	267	−21	1 stroke	(Scotland) Sam Torrance	Molinetto	
41st	1984	(Scotland) Sandy Lyle	277	−11	4 strokes	(United States) Bobby Clampett	Milano	
40th	1983	(West Germany) Bernhard Langer	271	−17	Playoff	(Spain) Seve Ballesteros (Scotland) Ken Brown	Ugolino	
39th	1982	(England) Mark James	280	−8	3 strokes	(United States) Bobby Clampett (Wales) Ian Woosnam	Is Molas	
38th	1981	(Spain) José María Cañizares	280	−8	Playoff	(United States) Bobby Clampett	Milano	
37th	1980	(Italy) Massimo Mannelli	276	−8	5 strokes	(South Africa) John Bland (Scotland) Ken Brown	Acquasanta	
36th	1979	(Scotland) Brian Barnes	281	−7	Playoff	(South Africa) Dale Hayes	Monticello	
35th	1978	(South Africa) Dale Hayes	293	+5	3 strokes	(South Africa) Vin Baker (England) Tommy Horton	Pevero	
34th	1977	(Spain) Ángel Gallardo	286	−2	Playoff	(Scotland) Brian Barnes	Monticello	
33rd	1976	(Italy) Baldovino Dassù	280	−8	8 strokes	(England) Carl Mason (Spain) Manuel Piñero	Is Molas	
32nd	1975	(United States) Billy Casper	286	−2	1 stroke	(Scotland) Brian Barnes	Monticello	
31st	1974	(England) Peter Oosterhuis	249 (Note: Shortened to 63 holes due to weather.)	−2	2 strokes	(South Africa) Dale Hayes (United States) Johnny Miller	Venezia	
30th	1973	(England) Tony Jacklin	284	−4	1 stroke	(Spain) Valentín Barrios	Acquasanta; Olgiata	
29th	1972	(Scotland) Norman Wood	271	−1	2 strokes	(Wales) Brian Huggett	Villa d'Este	
28th	1971	(Spain) Ramón Sota	282	−2	4 strokes	(Scotland) Brian Barnes	Garlenda	
1961–1970: No tournament
27th	1960	(South Africa) Brian Wilkes	285		2 strokes	(France) Jean Garaïalde	Venezia	
26th	1959	(Australia) Peter Thomson	269		1 stroke	(Italy) Alfonso Angelini	Villa d'Este	
25th	1958	(England) Peter Alliss	282		10 strokes	(Italy) Alfonso Angelini	Varese	
24th	1957	(South Africa) Harold Henning	273		3 strokes	(France) Roger Cotton	Villa d'Este	
23rd	1956	(Argentina) Antonio Cerdá	284		Playoff	(Belgium) Flory Van Donck	Milano	
22nd	1955	(Belgium) Flory Van Donck (4)	287		1 stroke	(France) Henri de Lamaze (a)	Venezia	
21st	1954	(Italy) Ugo Grappasonni (2)	272		Playoff (Note: Grappasonni beat Jacobs 137 to 138 in a 36-hole playoff.)	(England) John Jacobs	Villa d'Este	
20th	1953	(Belgium) Flory Van Donck (3)	269		6 strokes	(England) Max Faulkner (Wales) Dai Rees	Villa d'Este	
19th	1952	(Scotland) Eric Brown	273		6 strokes	(Italy) Alfonso Angelini	Milano	
18th	1951	(Scotland) Jimmy Adams	283		1 stroke	(Scotland) Eric Brown	Milano	
17th	1950	(Italy) Ugo Grappasonni	281		Playoff	(Italy) Alfonso Angelini	Acquasanta	
16th	1949	(Egypt) Hassan Hassanein	271			(Italy) Aldo Casera	Villa d'Este	
15th	1948	(Italy) Aldo Casera	267			(Italy) Ugo Grappasonni (Italy) Pietro Manca	Golf Sanremo	
14th	1947	(Belgium) Flory Van Donck (2)	263			(Italy) Aldo Casera	Golf Sanremo	
1939–1946: No tournament due to World War II
13th	1938	(Belgium) Flory Van Donck	276			(Italy) Pulvio Travaini	Villa d'Este	
12th	1937	(France) Marcel Dallemagne	276		Playoff	(France) Auguste Boyer	Golf Sanremo	
11th	1936	(England) Henry Cotton	268		6 strokes	(United States) Joe Ezar	Sestrieres	
10th	1935	(England) Percy Alliss (2)	262		5 strokes	(France) Auguste Boyer (England) Arthur Havers	Golf Sanremo	
9th	1934	(England) Norman Nutley	132			(Spain) Gonzales	Golf Sanremo	
1933: No tournament
8th	1932	(Jersey) Aubrey Boomer	143			(France) Auguste Boyer	Villa d'Este	
7th	1931	(France) Auguste Boyer (4)	141			(France) René Golias	Villa d'Este	
6th	1930	(France) Auguste Boyer (3)	140			(France) Marcel Dallemagne	Villa d'Este	
5th	1929	(France) René Golias	143			(France) Auguste Boyer	Villa d'Este	
4th	1928	(France) Auguste Boyer (2)	145		1 stroke	(France) Jean Baptiste Loth	Villa d'Este	
3rd	1927	(England) Percy Alliss	145		Playoff	(France) Marcel Dallemagne	Alpino di Stresa	
2nd	1926	(France) Auguste Boyer	147			(Scotland) Alec Ross	Alpino di Stresa	
1st	1925	(Italy) Francesco Pasquali	154		1 stroke	William Jolly	Alpino di Stresa	

=== Multiple winners ===
- 4 wins
  - Auguste Boyer: 1926, 1928, 1930, 1931
  - Flory Van Donck: 1938, 1947, 1953, 1955
- 2 wins
  - Percy Alliss: 1927, 1935
  - Ugo Grappasonni: 1950, 1954
  - Sandy Lyle: 1984, 1992
  - Sam Torrance: 1987, 1995
  - Bernhard Langer: 1983, 1997
  - Ian Poulter: 2000, 2002
  - Gonzalo Fernández-Castaño: 2007, 2012
  - Hennie Otto: 2008, 2014
  - Francesco Molinari: 2006, 2016

== See also ==
- Open golf tournament
