= Tom Green (golfer) =

Welsh golfer

Personal information
- Full name: Thomas Leslie Green
- Nationality: Wales
- Born: 12 April 1900 Prestatyn, Denbighshire, Wales
- Died: 18 February 1974 (aged 73) Barton on Sea, Hampshire

Career
- Sport: Golf
- Status: Professional
- Professional wins: 2

Best results in major championships
- Masters Tournament: DNP
- PGA Championship: DNP
- U.S. Open: DNP
- The Open Championship: T5: 1936

Thomas Leslie Green (12 April 1900 – 18 February 1974) was a Welsh-born professional golfer.

Green was born in Prestatyn on the north Wales coast where his father, Leslie, was a golf professional. Leslie was the professional at Colwyn Bay where Tom was later an assistant.

Green was professional at Copt Heath (to 1933), Burnham Beeches (1934–1945), Leamington and County (from 1947) and Stinchcombe Hill. While at Copt Heath, he was runner-up in the 1929 Midland Professional Championship and then the winner in 1930 and 1931. In 1936, he tied for 5th place in the Open Championship. After three rounds he had been just one stroke behind the leaders but a final round 75 dropped him down the order.

He represented England in the 1935 England–Scotland Professional Match but was later a member of the first professional Welsh teams in 1937 and 1938.

== Professional wins ==
- 1930 Midland Professional Championship
- 1931 Midland Professional Championship

== Results in major championships ==
Tournament	1926	1927	1928	1929	1930	1931	1932	1933	1934	1935	1936	1937
The Open Championship	CUT				29	CUT	T48	CUT	T26		T5	CUT

Note: Green only played in The Open Championship.

Top 10
Did not play

CUT = missed the half-way cut
"T" indicates a tie for a place

== Team appearances ==
- England–Scotland Professional Match (representing England): 1935 (winners)
- Triangular Professional Tournament (representing Wales): 1937
- Llandudno International Golf Trophy (representing Wales): 1938
