= Jimmy Adams (golfer) =

Scottish golfer

Personal information
- Full name: James Adams
- Nationality: Scotland
- Born: 21 October 1910 Troon, Scotland
- Died: 9 January 1986 (aged 75) London, England

Career
- Sport: Golf
- Status: Professional
- Professional wins: 9

Best results in major championships
- Masters Tournament: DNP
- PGA Championship: DNP
- U.S. Open: DNP
- The Open Championship: 2nd: 1936, 1938

James Adams (21 October 1910 – 9 January 1986) was a Scottish professional golfer who was chosen for five Ryder Cup sides and achieved high finishes in The Open Championship on several occasions (five top-10s including two seconds).

== Early life ==
Adams was born in Troon, Scotland.

== Professional career ==
At the age of 14, Adams turned professional. Nine years later, he won the 1933 Irish Professional Championship. Three years later, in 1936, he won the Penfold Tournament on the British PGA and came very close to winning The Open Championship at Hoylake. Adams shared the third-round lead with Henry Cotton, but despite beating Cotton (and Gene Sarazen, also in the field that year) in the final round, Adams finished a single shot behind Alf Padgham. In 1937 Adams was runner-up in the British PGA Matchplay championship, the first of three occasions he would reach the final of that event without winning it. Two years later, at the 1938 Open Championship at Royal St George's, Adams' final two rounds of 78-78 put him in second place, this time behind Reg Whitcombe.

World War II disrupted his career as little golf was played during this era in Britain. In the mid-1940s, after the war, his career resumed and he had some success. He won the 1946 British Masters (in a tie with Bobby Locke), the Silver King tournament in 1948 (tied with Charlie Ward), the Dutch Open and Belgian Open in 1949. In the early 1950s he continued with success finishing 4th at the 1951 Open Championship, winning the 1951 Italian Open, and the 1952 Lakes Open, an event in Australian. In 1954, Adams was the only player to break 70 in both the final two rounds of the 1954 Open Championship at Royal Birkdale with a pair of 69s and finished fifth, three shots behind champion Peter Thomson.

Adams was selected for the 1939 Ryder Cup team, although the matches did not take place, then again in 1947, 1949, 1951 and 1953. He won both his matches in 1949. In 1951, the British team all played in the North and South Open in America in preparation for the Ryder Cup matches, and Adams finished fourth in a field that contained the entire U.S. Ryder Cup team.

Adams was at Royal Liverpool before moving to Beaconsfield Golf Club in 1946. He was then head pro at the Wentworth Club from 1949 to 1952. In early 1952 he became the professional at Royal Sydney Golf Club but later in the year returned to England as professional at Royal Mid-Surrey Golf Club, where he stayed until 1969.

== Tournament wins ==
Note: This list may be incomplete.

- 1933 Irish Professional Championship
- 1936 Penfold Scottish Open
- 1946 British Masters (tie with Bobby Locke)
- 1948 Silver King Tournament (tie with Charlie Ward)
- 1949 Dutch Open, Belgian Open
- 1951 Italian Open
- 1952 Lakes Open
- 1955 Southern Professional Championship

== Results in major championships ==
Tournament	1930	1931	1932	1933	1934	1935	1936	1937	1938	1939
The Open Championship	CUT		CUT	T48	T26	CUT	2	T17	2	T13

Tournament	1940	1941	1942	1943	1944	1945	1946	1947	1948	1949
The Open Championship	NT	NT	NT	NT	NT	NT	CUT	12	CUT	T8

Tournament	1950	1951	1952	1953	1954	1955	1956	1957	1958	1959
The Open Championship	T12	T4		CUT	T5	CUT	T25	CUT	CUT	T29

Note: Adams only played in The Open Championship.

Top 10
Did not play

NT = No tournament
CUT = missed the half-way cut
"T" indicates a tie for a place

== Team appearances ==
- Ryder Cup (representing Great Britain): 1947, 1949, 1951, 1953
- England–Scotland Professional Match (representing Scotland): 1932, 1933, 1934, 1935, 1936, 1937, 1938
- Coronation Match (representing the Ladies and Professionals): 1937
- Triangular Professional Tournament (representing Scotland): 1937 (winners, captain)
- Llandudno International Golf Trophy (representing Scotland): 1938 (captain)
- Great Britain–Argentina Professional Match (representing Great Britain): 1939 (winners)
- Amateurs–Professionals Match (representing the Professionals): 1956 (winners)
- Vicars Shield (representing New South Wales): 1952
