= Percy Boomer =

English golfer (1885–1949)

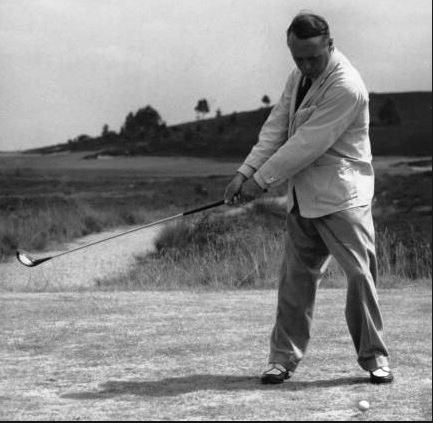
- Boomer in the backswing, c. 1928

Personal information
- Full name: Percy Hugh Boomer
- Nationality: Jersey
- Born: 1885 Islington, London, England
- Died: 29 April 1949 (aged 63–64) Sunningdale, Berkshire, England

Career
- Sport: Golf
- Status: Professional
- Professional wins: 3

Best results in major championships
- Masters Tournament: DNP
- PGA Championship: DNP
- U.S. Open: DNP
- The Open Championship: CUT: 1910, 1927, 1928

Achievements and awards
- World Golf Teachers Hall of Fame: 1998

Percy Hugh Boomer (1885 – 29 April 1949) was an English professional golfer from the Isle of Jersey. Boomer won three tournaments—the 1923 Belgian Open, the 1924 Swiss Open, and the 1927 Dutch Open. His brother, Aubrey Boomer, was also a professional golfer, as was his son Percy George (known as George). George qualified for the 1950 Open Championship but missed the cut by a single stroke.

== Early life ==
Boomer was born circa 1885 in Islington, London, England. He grew up on the Isle of Jersey where his father was a school teacher in Grouville.

== Teacher of golf ==
He was a well known golf teacher of the early 20th century and wrote one of the most popular instructional books on golf of the era, On Learning Golf, published in 1942. He learned to play golf through the writing of Harry Vardon and Ted Ray.

Boomer was one of the top teachers of golf in Europe and spent the majority of his professional career at St. Cloud Country Club in the Paris suburbs. He was a proponent of muscle memory in the golf swing and reminded his students to block out negative thoughts in favor of more positive ones in order to play better golf. He was one of the first golf teachers to use stop-action photography.

Boomer endeared himself to his followers when he wrote, "Everything I have ever done in golf, I have had to learn to do [myself]."

== Death and legacy ==
He died on 29 April 1949 in Sunningdale, Berkshire, England. He had been the professional at Sunningdale Golf Club since 1941. Boomer was inducted into the World Golf Teachers Hall of Fame in 1998.

== Tournament wins (3) ==
Note: This list may be incomplete

- 1923 Belgian Open
- 1924 Swiss Open
- 1927 Dutch Open

== Results in major championships ==
Tournament	1910	1911	1912	1913	1914	1915	1916	1917	1918	1919
The Open Championship	CUT	WD				NT	NT	NT	NT	NT

Tournament	1920	1921	1922	1923	1924	1925	1926	1927	1928
The Open Championship								CUT	CUT

Note: Boomer only played in The Open Championship.

Did not play

NT = no tournament
CUT = missed the half-way cut
WD = withdrew
