= Francis Francis (golfer) =

English golfer

Francis ("Frank") Francis (28 May 1906 – 24 December 1982) was a wealthy English amateur golfer.

== Early life and education ==
Francis was born in London in 1906, the son of Francis Francis IV, an English army officer, and his American wife, heiress Frances (Fannie) Evelyn Bostwick. Francis' half-sister was Marion Barbara "Joe" Carstairs through his mother's first marriage.

Francis was the grandson of industrialist and founding partner of Standard Oil, Jabez Bostwick, and the writer Francis Francis III. He was also the great-great-grandson of Henry Robinson Hartley, benefactor of the Hartley Institute, which would later become the University of Southampton.

Francis attended Rugby school. While at Rugby, he inherited a fortune from his grandmother.

== Golfing career ==
Francis was a skilled golfer with a passion for high-octane sports, such as race car driving, flying, and motorboating.

Francis won the Swiss Open in 1936. He also won the Dutch International Amateur Golf Championship in 1935 and 1936, the Surrey Amateur Golf Championship in 1936, and was runner up in the French International Amateur Championship in 1934, the Belgian Open Amateur Championship in 1934 and 1935, and the Dutch Open in 1936. He represented England in the Home Internationals in 1936. In 1937, he was invited to play in the Masters Tournament, which would later become recognised as one of golf's four major championships.

In 1958, at the age of 52, he won the Swiss International Amateur Golf Championship. He won the title again in 1960.

=== Tournament wins ===
- 1935 Addington Foursomes (with Auguste Boyer), Dutch International Amateur Championship
- 1936 Swiss Open, Dutch International Amateur Championship, Surrey Amateur Golf Championship
- 1938 Sunningdale Foursomes (with Leonard Crawley)
- 1958 Swiss International Amateur Championship
- 1960 Swiss International Amateur Championship

== Military career ==
Francis joined the Royal Horse Guards about 1923. A former subaltern, Francis resigned his commission in 1929 at the rank of lieutenant to marry an actress. During World War II, he served with the Air Transport Auxiliary.

== Personal life ==
Francis married first wife, American actress Sunny Jarman in 1929. She was 19; he was 23. The couple met while Jarman was acting in the musical comedy "Hold Everything" at the Palace Theatre, London. The couple had two sons, one of whom became a lawyer and the other a submarine officer.

His second wife was the stage actress Patricia Leonard; they married about 1947. They had one son and one daughter.

Francis bought the private island, Bird Cay, Bahamas from his sister, Joe Carstairs in the 1940s where he had fruit and coconut interests. Francis lived between Geneva, Bird Cay, and London until his death in 1982.
