= Omega European Masters =

Golf tournament

Coordinates: 46.18°N 7.28°E

Tournament information
- Location: Crans-Montana, Switzerland
- Established: 1923
- Course: Crans-sur-Sierre Golf Club
- Par: 70
- Length: 6,824 yards (6,240 m)
- Tours: European Tour; Asian Tour
- Format: Stroke play
- Prize fund: US$3,250,000
- Month played: August

Tournament record score
- Aggregate: 258 Thriston Lawrence (2025)
- To par: −27 Jerry Anderson (1984)

Current champion
- (South Africa) Thriston Lawrence

Location map
- Location in Switzerland

The Omega European Masters is the Swiss stop on professional men's golf's European Tour, and in 2009 it became the first event in Europe to be co-sanctioned by the Asian Tour.

Founded as the Swiss Open in 1923, the tournament was prefixed with European Masters in 1983, before dropping Swiss Open from the title in 1992. During the 1971 event, Baldovino Dassù became the first player to score 60 for 18 holes on the European circuit. The tournament has been held at the Golf-Club Crans-sur-Sierre at Crans-Montana in Valais since 1939, and is currently played in early September each year.

== Michelle Wie at 2006 tournament ==
In May 2006, Michelle Wie, who had a sponsorship contract with Omega, accepted an invitation from the company to play in the 2006 tournament, making her first attempt to play on the men's European Tour. At the September event she shot 78–79 to finish 15-over-par over two rounds and finished in last place among the 156 competitors. European Tour executive director George O'Grady said on 8 September 2006 that Wie's appearance was "an experiment" and he would need "a lot of persuading" before inviting Wie to participate in such an event again, despite record crowds estimated at 9,500.

== Winners ==
Year	Tour(s) (Note: ASA – Asian Tour; EUR – European Tour.)	Winner	Score	To par	Margin of victory	Runner(s)-up	Ref.
Omega European Masters
2026	EUR	(South Africa) Thriston Lawrence (3)	262	−18	Playoff	(England) Paul Casey	
2025	EUR	(South Africa) Thriston Lawrence (2)	258	−22	2 strokes	(Denmark) Rasmus Højgaard (Finland) Sami Välimäki (England) Matt Wallace	
2024	EUR	(England) Matt Wallace	269	−11	Playoff	(Spain) Alfredo García-Heredia	
2023	EUR	(Sweden) Ludvig Åberg	261	−19	2 strokes	(Sweden) Alexander Björk	
2022	EUR	(South Africa) Thriston Lawrence	262	−18	Playoff	(England) Matt Wallace	
2021	EUR	(Denmark) Rasmus Højgaard	267	−13	1 stroke	(Austria) Bernd Wiesberger	
2020	EUR	Cancelled due to the COVID-19 pandemic					
2019	EUR	(Sweden) Sebastian Söderberg	266	−14	Playoff	(Italy) Lorenzo Gagli (Northern Ireland) Rory McIlroy (Argentina) Andrés Romero (Finland) Kalle Samooja	
2018	EUR	(England) Matt Fitzpatrick (2)	263	−17	Playoff	(Denmark) Lucas Bjerregaard	
2017	ASA, EUR	(England) Matt Fitzpatrick	266	−14	Playoff	(Australia) Scott Hend	
2016	ASA, EUR	(Sweden) Alex Norén (2)	263	−17	Playoff	(Australia) Scott Hend	
2015	ASA, EUR	(England) Danny Willett	263	−17	1 stroke	(England) Matt Fitzpatrick	
2014	ASA, EUR	(United States) David Lipsky	262	−18	Playoff	(England) Graeme Storm	
2013	ASA, EUR	(Denmark) Thomas Bjørn (2)	264	−20	Playoff	(Scotland) Craig Lee	
2012	ASA, EUR	(Scotland) Richie Ramsay	267	−17	4 strokes	(Sweden) Fredrik Andersson Hed (Australia) Marcus Fraser (France) Romain Wattel (England) Danny Willett	
2011	ASA, EUR	(Denmark) Thomas Bjørn	264	−20	4 strokes	(Germany) Martin Kaymer	
2010	ASA, EUR	(Spain) Miguel Ángel Jiménez	263	−21	3 strokes	(Italy) Edoardo Molinari	
2009	ASA, EUR	(Sweden) Alex Norén	264	−20	2 strokes	(Wales) Bradley Dredge	
2008	EUR	(France) Jean-François Lucquin	271	−13	Playoff	(Northern Ireland) Rory McIlroy	
2007	EUR	(Australia) Brett Rumford	268	−16	Playoff	(England) Phillip Archer	
2006	EUR	(Wales) Bradley Dredge	267	−17	8 strokes	(Germany) Marcel Siem (Italy) Francesco Molinari	
2005	EUR	(Spain) Sergio García	270	−14	1 stroke	(Sweden) Peter Gustafsson	
2004	EUR	(England) Luke Donald	265	−19	5 strokes	(Spain) Miguel Ángel Jiménez	
2003	EUR	(South Africa) Ernie Els	267	−17	6 strokes	(New Zealand) Michael Campbell	
2002	EUR	(Sweden) Robert Karlsson	270	−14	4 strokes	(South Africa) Trevor Immelman (Scotland) Paul Lawrie	
2001	EUR	(Argentina) Ricardo González	268	−16	3 strokes	(Denmark) Søren Hansen	
Canon European Masters
2000	EUR	(Argentina) Eduardo Romero (2)	261	−23	10 strokes	(Denmark) Thomas Bjørn	
1999	EUR	(England) Lee Westwood	270	−14	2 strokes	(Denmark) Thomas Bjørn	
1998	EUR	(Germany) Sven Strüver	263	−21	Playoff	(Sweden) Patrik Sjöland	
1997	EUR	(Italy) Costantino Rocca	266	−18	1 stroke	(Scotland) Scott Henderson (Sweden) Robert Karlsson	
1996	EUR	(Scotland) Colin Montgomerie	260	−24	4 strokes	(Scotland) Sam Torrance	
1995	EUR	(Sweden) Mathias Grönberg	270	−18	2 strokes	(Italy) Costantino Rocca (England) Barry Lane	
1994	EUR	(Argentina) Eduardo Romero	266	−22	1 stroke	(Sweden) Pierre Fulke	
1993	EUR	(England) Barry Lane	270	−18	1 stroke	(Spain) Seve Ballesteros (Spain) Miguel Ángel Jiménez	
1992	EUR	(England) Jamie Spence	271	−17	Playoff	(Sweden) Anders Forsbrand	
Canon European Masters Swiss Open
1991	EUR	(South Africa) Jeff Hawkes	268	−20	1 stroke	(Spain) Seve Ballesteros	
Ebel European Masters Swiss Open
1990	EUR	(Northern Ireland) Ronan Rafferty	267	−21	2 strokes	(South Africa) John Bland	
1989	EUR	(Spain) Seve Ballesteros (3)	266	−14	2 strokes	(Australia) Craig Parry	
1988	EUR	(England) Chris Moody	268	−20	1 stroke	(Spain) Seve Ballesteros (Sweden) Anders Forsbrand (Wales) Ian Woosnam	
1987	EUR	(Sweden) Anders Forsbrand	263	−25	3 strokes	(Wales) Mark Mouland	
1986	EUR	(Spain) José María Olazábal	262	−26	3 strokes	(Sweden) Anders Forsbrand	
1985	EUR	(United States) Craig Stadler	267	−21	2 strokes	(Northern Ireland) David Feherty (Sweden) Ove Sellberg	
1984	EUR	(Canada) Jerry Anderson	261	−27	5 strokes	(England) Howard Clark	
1983	EUR	(England) Nick Faldo	268	−20	Playoff	(Scotland) Sandy Lyle	
Ebel Swiss Open
1982	EUR	(Wales) Ian Woosnam	272	−16	Playoff	(Scotland) Bill Longmuir	
Swiss Open
1981	EUR	(Spain) Manuel Piñero (2)	277	−11	Playoff	(Spain) Antonio Garrido (Zimbabwe) Tony Johnstone	
1980	EUR	(Zimbabwe) Nick Price	267	−21	6 strokes	(Spain) Manuel Calero	
1979	EUR	(South Africa) Hugh Baiocchi (2)	275	−5	5 strokes	(Spain) Antonio Garrido (South Africa) Dale Hayes (Italy) Delio Lovato	
1978	EUR	(Spain) Seve Ballesteros (2)	272	−8	3 strokes	(Spain) Manuel Piñero	
1977	EUR	(Spain) Seve Ballesteros	273	−7	3 strokes	(United States) John Schroeder	
1976	EUR	(Spain) Manuel Piñero	274	−6	3 strokes	(United States) Dave Hill (Spain) Seve Ballesteros	
1975	EUR	(South Africa) Dale Hayes	273	−7	1 stroke	(South Africa) Tienie Britz (Scotland) Bernard Gallacher (South Africa) Gary Player	
1974	EUR	(New Zealand) Bob Charles (2)	275	−5	1 stroke	(England) Tony Jacklin	
1973	EUR	(South Africa) Hugh Baiocchi	278	−2	1 stroke	(Australia) Jack Newton (Northern Ireland) Eddie Polland	
1972	EUR	(Australia) Graham Marsh	270	−10	1 stroke	(England) Tony Jacklin	
1971		(England) Peter Townsend	270	−10	1 stroke	(Spain) Manuel Ballesteros	
1970		(Australia) Graham Marsh	274		8 strokes	(Belgium) Donald Swaelens (France) Jean Garaïalde	
1969		(Italy) Roberto Bernardini (2)	277		2 strokes	(West Germany) Gerhard Koening	
1968		(Italy) Roberto Bernardini	272		Playoff	(South Africa) Allan Henning (Australia) Randall Vines	
1967		(Australia) Randall Vines	272		2 strokes	(England) Guy Wolstenholme	
1966		(Italy) Alfonso Angelini (2)	271		5 strokes	(England) Tony Grubb	
1965		(South Africa) Harold Henning (3)	208 (Note: Shortened to 54 holes due to rain and fog.)		4 strokes	(France) Roger Cotton	
1964		(South Africa) Harold Henning (2)	276		1 stroke	(Italy) Alfonso Angelini	
1963		(Wales) Dai Rees (3)	278		Playoff	(South Africa) Harold Henning	
1962		(New Zealand) Bob Charles	272		Playoff	(Belgium) Flory Van Donck (England) Peter Butler	
1961		(Australia) Kel Nagle	268		2 strokes	(Wales) Dai Rees	
1960		(South Africa) Harold Henning	270		3 strokes	(South Africa) Brian Wilkes	
1959		(Wales) Dai Rees (2)	274		1 stroke	(England) Syd Scott	
1958		(England) Ken Bousfield	272		1 stroke	(Belgium) Flory Van Donck	
1957		(Italy) Alfonso Angelini	270		4 strokes	(Belgium) Flory Van Donck	
1956		(Wales) Dai Rees	278		Playoff	(Belgium) Flory Van Donck	
1955		(Belgium) Flory Van Donck (2)	277				
1954		(South Africa) Bobby Locke	276				
1953		(Belgium) Flory Van Donck	267				
1952		(Italy) Ugo Grappasonni	267				
1951		(Scotland) Eric Brown	267				
1950		(Italy) Aldo Casera	276		4 strokes	(Scotland) Eric Brown	
1949		(France) Marcel Dallemagne (3)	270				
1948		(Italy) Ugo Grappasonni	285				
1940–1947: No tournament							
1939		(France) Firmin Cavalo Jr.	273			(England) James Peterson	
1938		(France) Jean Saubaber	139				
1937		(France) Marcel Dallemagne (2)	138				
1936		(England) Francis Francis (a)	134				
1935		(France) Auguste Boyer (3)	137				
1934		(France) Auguste Boyer (2)	133				
1932–1933: No tournament							
1931		(France) Marcel Dallemagne	145				
1930		(France) Auguste Boyer	150				
1929		(England) Alex Wilson	142				
1927–1928: No tournament							
1926		(Scotland) Alec Ross (3)	145				
1925		(Scotland) Alec Ross (2)	148				
1924		(Jersey) Percy Boomer	150				
1923		(Scotland) Alec Ross	149				
1906–1922: No tournament
1905		(England) Arthur Reid	155		13 strokes	(England) Bernard Callaway	

== See also ==
- Open golf tournament
