= Jack Taylor (golfer) =

English professional golfer (1897–1971)

Personal information
- Full name: John James Taylor
- Nationality: England
- Born: 10 December 1897 Northam, Devon, England
- Died: 1971 (aged 73) Hertfordshire, England

Career
- Sport: Golf
- Status: Professional
- Professional wins: 4

Best results in major championships
- Masters Tournament: DNP
- PGA Championship: DNP
- U.S. Open: DNP
- The Open Championship: T32: 1929

John James Taylor (10 December 1897 – 1971), often known as J. J. Taylor, was an English professional golfer. He won the Dutch Open in 1929.

== Early life ==
Taylor was born in Northam, Devon, the son of Richard and Emma Jane Taylor who had been married in 1884. Despite being from the same small town in Devon, Taylor was unrelated to J. H. Taylor.

== Golf career ==
Taylor was an assistant professional at Radyr Golf Club in south Wales when he played for the 1922 Findlater Shield. The following year he won the event, played at Bushey Hall, by 6 strokes. In 1924 he moved to Crews Hill in north London. He entered the Open Championship that year and scored 72 in the first qualifying round, tying third place of those playing at Formby. A 77 at Hoylake left him tied for 5th place in the qualifying. Scoring 89 and 81 in the first two rounds of the event, he withdrew. In early 1925 he moved again, to nearby Potters Bar. He played in the first Middlesex Professional Championship in 1925, tying with Fred Leach on 150. Taylor won the 36-hole replay by 155 to 158 to win the Championship. Taylor won the Middlesex Professional Championship again the following year with a score of 146, beating Fred Jewell by a stroke.

Taylor finished runner-up in the 1928 Belgian Open and won the Dutch Open in 1929. He reached the semi-finals of the News of the World Match Play in 1928 and 1936.

== Professional wins ==
- 1923 Findlater Shield
- 1925 Middlesex Professional Championship
- 1926 Middlesex Professional Championship
- 1929 Dutch Open

== Results in major championships ==
Tournament	1924	1925	1926	1927	1928	1929	1930	1931	1932	1933	1934	1935	1936	1937
The Open Championship	WD	WD	WD		CUT	T32	T39			CUT	CUT			T37

Note: Taylor only played in The Open Championship.

Did not play

WD = withdrew
CUT = missed the half-way cut
"T" indicates a tie for a place

== Team appearances ==
- England–Scotland Professional Match (representing England): 1937 (winners)
