= Triangular Professional Tournament =

Tournament information
- Location: Bishopbriggs, Glasgow, Scotland
- Established: 1937
- Course(s): Cawder Golf Club
- Format: Team match play
- Month played: October
- Final year: 1937

Final champion
- Scotland

The Triangular Professional Tournament was a professional team match play golf tournament that was played at the Cawder Golf Club from 21 to 23 October 1937. The tournament was contested between Scotland, Ireland and Wales. Scotland won the tournament by winning both their matches. The following year the event was extended to include England and the four teams played for the Llandudno International Golf Trophy.

== Format ==
The tournament was played over three days with each team playing the other two. There were 5 foursomes matches in the morning and 10 singles in the afternoon. All matches were over 18 holes.

== Teams ==
The following played in at least one match:

- Scotland: Jimmy Adams (Captain), Willam Anderson, William Davis, Tom Dobson, John Donaldson, John Fallon, Willie Hastings, George Hutton, Bill Laidlaw, Willie Spark
- Ireland: Paddy Mahon (Captain), Harry Bradshaw, Joe Carroll, Denis Cassidy, Fred Daly, Bill Kinsella, Joe McCartney, John McKenna, Willie Nolan, Willie O'Brien, Ernie Patterson
- Wales: Tom Jones (Captain), Tom Green, Frank Hill, Bert Hodson, Gwyn James, D. C. Jones, Fred Lloyd, Charles Pickett, Dai Rees, Ken Williams

Tom Green had played for England in the 1935 England–Scotland Professional Match.

== Results ==
=== Matches ===
Thursday 21 October

Team	Score	Team	Score	Halved
Scotland	8	Wales	6	1

Friday 22 October

Team	Score	Team	Score	Halved
Wales	9	(Republic of Ireland) Ireland	5	1

Saturday 23 October

Team	Score	Team	Score	Halved
Scotland	12	(Republic of Ireland) Ireland	2	1

=== Final table ===
Team	Matches		Individual games		
Team	Won	Lost	Won	Lost	Halved
Scotland	2	0	20	8	2
Wales	1	1	15	13	2
(Republic of Ireland) Ireland	0	2	7	21	2
