= Belgian Open (golf) =

Coordinates: 51.2807°N 4.5737°E

Soudal Open

Tournament information
- Location: Antwerp, Belgium
- Established: 1910
- Course: Rinkven International Golf Club
- Par: 71
- Length: 6,924 yards (6,331 m)
- Tour: European Tour
- Format: Stroke play
- Prize fund: US$2,500,000
- Month played: May

Tournament record score
- Aggregate: 266 Lee Westwood (2000); 266 Nacho Elvira (2024)
- To par: −18 as above

Current champion
- (South Africa) Richard Sterne

Final champion
- Location in Belgium

The Belgian Open is a men's golf tournament which has been played intermittently from 1910 to 2000. All editions since 1978 have been part of the European Tour. After not having been played since 2000, it returned in 2018 as the Belgian Knockout, hosted by PietersProductions, along with its co-founder, Belgian professional golfer Thomas Pieters. With a prize pool set at €1 million, 144 professional golfers start the competition with 36 holes of stroke play, followed by 9-hole match play for the top 64 finishers from the stroke play rounds.

After two years of no European Tour international tournament, the Soudal Open came in 2022. Soudal partnered with Rinkven and once again put on a top international event.

== History ==
The first ever Belgian Open was played at the Royal Golf Club of Belgium, featuring 36 holes. It was not until 1928 that the competition format expanded to 72 holes. The first edition of the tournament was won by Arnaud Massy, the only Frenchman to win a major championship. Other distinguished champions included Walter Hagen, Henry Cotton, José María Olazábal, Nick Faldo and Lee Westwood. Belgium's most successful 20th century golfer, Flory Van Donck, won his home open five times between 1939 and 1956.

In 2018, PietersProductions took over the organisation of the Belgian Open. After an absence of 18 years, they brought the Belgian Open back to the European Tour. The Belgian Open was reintroduced under the name Belgian Knockout.

The first edition of the Belgian Knockout, which was the 53rd edition of the Belgian Open, took place from 17 to 20 May 2018 at Rinkven International Golf Club, Schilde, Antwerp. In the final, the Spaniard Adrián Otaegui won against Frenchman Benjamin Hébert after four match days. David Drysdale took third place after winning against James Heath.

In 2021, it was announced that the tournament would make a return in 2022 and would revert to a stroke play event. It was sponsored by Soudal, and renamed as the Soudal Open.

== Format in 2018 and 2019 ==
There are two rounds of stroke-play on the first two days. The top 64 and ties are credited with prize money and are declared to have advanced under Tour rules. However, in case of a tie for 64th place, there is a playoff if players are tied for 64th place to determine who advances to the knockout stages. Players eliminated in the playoff earn 65th place prize money and are credited with making the cut ("MDF").

In the knock-out stage there are six rounds, each match being over nine holes of stroke-play. Players are seeded based on their position after 36 holes. On the first day of knockout there are three rounds. Half the players use the front nine holes, the other half use the back nine. If the two players are tied after 9 holes there is a sudden-death playoff. There is also a 3rd/4th place playoff. Placings for those who didn't reach the semi-finals are decided firstly by the knockout round reached and, for those who lost in the same round, on their score in the opening 36 holes.

Two major changes will be implemented in 2019 for the event. In order to remove a potential advantage/disadvantage that may happen with some groups, the 144 players are now grouped in two sections of 72 players each. One section plays on the first morning and the second afternoon, the other on the first afternoon and second morning. The top 32 players qualify from each section, each section having a separate playoff if required. The second change applies to the first knockout round. The top 16 players will earn an advantage headed to the first knockout round. If their first-round match is tied after nine holes, they automatically advance.

== Winners ==
Year	Winner	Score	To par	Margin of victory	Runner(s)-up	Venue	Ref.
Soudal Open
2026	(South Africa) Richard Sterne	266	−18	2 strokes	(England) Marcus Armitage (Spain) Jorge Campillo (Japan) Kota Kaneko (Sweden) Marcus Kinhult (Denmark) Jacob Skov Olesen (France) Victor Perez	Rinkven International	
2025	(Norway) Kristoffer Reitan	271	−13	Playoff	(Scotland) Ewen Ferguson (Netherlands) Darius van Driel	Rinkven International	
2024	(Spain) Nacho Elvira	266	−18	1 stroke	(France) Romain Langasque (Denmark) Niklas Nørgaard (Belgium) Thomas Pieters	Rinkven International	
2023	(Sweden) Simon Forsström	267	−17	1 stroke	(Sweden) Jens Dantorp	Rinkven International	
2022	(England) Sam Horsfield	271	−13	2 strokes	(New Zealand) Ryan Fox (Germany) Yannik Paul	Rinkven International	
2020–21: No tournament
Belgian Knockout
2019	(Italy) Guido Migliozzi	−3 (Note: Between 2018–19, the event used a knockout format. This is the score in the final.)		4 strokes	(Netherlands) Darius van Driel	Rinkven International	
2018	(Spain) Adrián Otaegui	−3		2 strokes	(France) Benjamin Hébert	Rinkven International	
2001–2017: No tournament
Belgacom Open
2000	(England) Lee Westwood (2)	266	−18	4 strokes	(Argentina) Eduardo Romero	Royal Zoute	
1999	(Sweden) Robert Karlsson	272	−12	1 stroke	(South Africa) Retief Goosen (England) Jamie Spence	Royal Zoute	
1998	(England) Lee Westwood	268	−16	Playoff	(Sweden) Freddie Jacobson	Royal Zoute	
1995–1997: No tournament
Alfred Dunhill Open
1994	(England) Nick Faldo	279	−5	Playoff	(Sweden) Joakim Haeggman	Royal Zoute	
1993	(Northern Ireland) Darren Clarke	270	−14	2 strokes	(England) Nick Faldo (Fiji) Vijay Singh	Royal Zoute	
Piaget Belgian Open
1992	(Spain) Miguel Ángel Jiménez	274	−10	3 strokes	(England) Barry Lane	Royal Zoute	
Renault Belgian Open
1991	(Sweden) Per-Ulrik Johansson	276	−12	Playoff	(England) Paul Broadhurst	Royal Waterloo	
Peugeot-Trends Belgian Open
1990	(Sweden) Ove Sellberg	272	−16	4 strokes	(Wales) Ian Woosnam	Royal Waterloo	
Volvo Belgian Open
1989	(England) Gordon J. Brand	273	−11	4 strokes	(England) Kevin Dickens	Royal Waterloo	
1988	(Spain) José María Olazábal	269	−15	4 strokes	(United States) Mike Smith	Royal Bercuit	
1987	(Republic of Ireland) Eamonn Darcy	200 (Note: Shortened to 54 holes due to rain.)	−13	1 stroke	(England) Nick Faldo (Northern Ireland) Ronan Rafferty (Wales) Ian Woosnam	Royal Waterloo	
Belgian Open
1980–1986: No tournament
1979	(South Africa) Gavan Levenson	279	−5	3 strokes	(South Africa) Bobby Cole (England) Nick Faldo (England) Michael King	Royal Waterloo	
1978	(Australia) Noel Ratcliffe	280	−12	1 stroke	(Australia) Chris Tickner	Royal GC Belgium	
1959–1977: No tournament
1958	(England) Ken Bousfield	271		3 strokes	(Argentina) Antonio Cerdá	Royal GC Belgium	
1957	(England) Bernard Hunt	280		Playoff	(Wales) Dai Rees	Royal Latem	
1956	(Belgium) Flory Van Donck (5)	269		8 strokes	(Spain) Ángel Miguel	Royal Latem	
1955	(Wales) Dave Thomas	290		1 stroke	(Belgium) Arthur Devulder	Royal GC des Fagnes	
1954	(Wales) Dai Rees	287		1 stroke	(Italy) Aldo Casera (Australia) Norman Von Nida	Royal Antwerp	
1953	(Belgium) Flory Van Donck (4)	270		9 strokes	(France) Henri de Lamaze (a)	Royal Waterloo	
1952	(Argentina) Antonio Cerdá	286		4 strokes	(South Africa) Brian Wilkes	Royal GC des Fagnes	
1951	(France) Albert Pélissier	279		5 strokes	(Belgium) Flory Van Donck (Egypt) Hassan Hassanein	Royal Latem	
1950	(Argentina) Roberto De Vicenzo	282		4 strokes	(Argentina) Antonio Cerdá	Royal Zoute	
1949	(Scotland) Jimmy Adams	283		2 strokes	(England) Max Faulkner	Royal GC des Fagnes	
1948	(Scotland) Willie Forrester	288				Royal GC Belgium	
1947	(Belgium) Flory Van Donck (3)	283				Royal GC des Fagnes	
1946	(Belgium) Flory Van Donck (2)	289		4 strokes	(Scotland) Willie Forrester	Royal Waterloo	
1940–1945: No tournament due to World War II
1939	(Belgium) Flory Van Donck	291		1 stroke	(England) Max Faulkner	Royal GC Belgium	
1938	(England) Henry Cotton (3)	277		13 strokes	(England) Arthur Lacey	Royal Waterloo	
1937	(France) Marcel Dallemagne (2)	285		4 strokes	(Wales) Dai Rees	Royal Zoute	
1936	(France) Auguste Boyer (2)	285		1 stroke	(England) Henry Cotton	Royal GC des Fagnes	
1935	(England) Bill Branch	283		Playoff	(Belgium) Flory Van Donck	Royal GC Belgium	
1934	(England) Henry Cotton (2)	279		3 strokes	(England) Percy Alliss	Royal Waterloo	
1933	(France) Auguste Boyer	282		3 strokes	(England) Henry Cotton	Royal GC des Fagnes	
1932	(England) Arthur Lacey (2)	291		2 strokes	(France) Auguste Boyer	Royal GC Belgium	
1931	(England) Arthur Lacey	301		1 stroke	(France) Marcel Dallemagne (France) Pierre Hirogoyen	Royal GC des Fagnes	
1930	(England) Henry Cotton	281		11 strokes	(England) Archie Compston	Royal GC Belgium	
1929	(South Africa) Sid Brews	300		1 stroke	(Jersey) Aubrey Boomer	Royal Antwerp	
1928	(England) Albert Tingey Jr.	297		3 strokes	(England) Jack Taylor	Royal GC Belgium	
1927	(France) Marcel Dallemagne	140				Royal Zoute	
1926	(Jersey) Aubrey Boomer (2)	137		9 strokes	(Jersey) Percy Boomer	Royal Zoute	
1925	(France) Eugène Lafitte (2)	142		1 stroke	(England) Arthur Havers	Royal Antwerp	
1924	(United States) Walter Hagen	143		3 strokes	(Jersey) Aubrey Boomer	Zoute	
1923	(Jersey) Percy Boomer	145		1 stroke	(Jersey) Aubrey Boomer	Royal GC Belgium	
1922	(Jersey) Aubrey Boomer	150		1 stroke	(Isle of Man) Charles Corlett (France) Marius Cavallo	Royal GC Belgium	
1921	(France) Eugène Lafitte	145		10 strokes	(England) George Pannell	Royal GC Belgium	
1920	(England) Rowland Jones	154		Playoff	(Jersey) Aubrey Boomer (England) Henry Burrows	Zoute	
1915–1919: No tournament due to World War I
1914	(England) Tom Ball (2)	144		4 strokes	(England) Charles Mayo	Royal Antwerp	
1913	(England) Tom Ball	145		1 stroke	(Scotland) James Braid	Lombardsijde	
1912	(Scotland) George Duncan	144		Playoff	(England) Tom Ball (Jersey) Ted Ray	Royal GC Belgium	
1911	(England) Charles Mayo	144		3 strokes	(France) Arnaud Massy	Royal GC Belgium	
1910	(France) Arnaud Massy	139		5 strokes	(Scotland) Sandy Herd (England) Harry Vardon	Royal GC Belgium	

In 1957 Hunt (137) beat Rees (145) by 8 strokes in a 36-hole playoff. In 1935 Branch (145) beat Van Donck (149) by 4 strokes in a 36-hole playoff. In 1912 Duncan (70) beat Ray (71) and Ball (78) in an 18-hole playoff, played the same evening.

== See also ==
- Open golf tournament
