= 1978 European Tour =

Golf tour season

1978 European Tour season
- Duration: 6 April 1978 – 22 October 1978
- Number of official events: 21
- Most wins: (Spain) Seve Ballesteros (4)
- Order of Merit: (Spain) Seve Ballesteros
- Sir Henry Cotton Rookie of the Year: (Scotland) Sandy Lyle

The 1978 European Tour, titled as the 1978 PGA European Tournament Players' Division, was the seventh season of the European Tour, the main professional golf tour in Europe since its inaugural season in 1972.

== Changes for 1978 ==
There were several changes from the previous season, with the addition of the Belgian Open, the B.A./Avis Open in Jersey, and the European Open Championship; the return of the Sumrie Better-Ball; and the loss of the Uniroyal International Championship, the Callers of Newcastle, and the Double Diamond team and individual events. In addition, the Kerrygold International was omitted from the schedule in 1978 due to the World Cup being held at Waterville. The Lancome Trophy, which clashed with the new European Open, was also missing.

== Schedule ==
The following table lists official events during the 1978 season.

Date	Tournament	Host country	Purse (£)	Winner (Note: The number in brackets after each winner's name is the number of European Tour events they had won up to and including that tournament. This information is only shown for European Tour members and are inclusive of the three United States-based major championships which were included on the schedule for the first time in 1998, with earlier editions having retrospectively been recognised as official tour wins.)	Notes
9 Apr	Masters Tournament	United States	US$262,402	(South Africa) Gary Player (n/a)	Major championship (Note: Unofficial money event at the time, but retrospectively counted as an official win.)
15 Apr	Portuguese Open	Portugal	25,000	(England) Howard Clark (1)	
22 Apr	Spanish Open	Spain	30,000	(Scotland) Brian Barnes (5)	
29 Apr	Madrid Open	Spain	20,500	(England) Howard Clark (2)	
7 May	Italian Open	Italy	27,700	(South Africa) Dale Hayes (2)	
15 May	French Open	France	35,000	(South Africa) Dale Hayes (3)	
21 May	Martini International	England	30,000	(Spain) Seve Ballesteros (5)	
29 May	Colgate PGA Championship	England	50,000	(England) Nick Faldo (2)	
4 Jun	B.A./Avis Open	Jersey	20,000	(Wales) Brian Huggett (2)	New tournament
11 Jun	Belgian Open	Belgium	25,000	(Australia) Noel Ratcliffe (1)	New to European Tour
18 Jun	Greater Manchester Open	England	20,000	(Scotland) Brian Barnes (6)	
18 Jun	U.S. Open	United States	US$310,200	(United States) Andy North (n/a)	Major championship
1 Jul	Sun Alliance Match Play Championship	Scotland	40,000	(England) Mark James (1)	
15 Jul	The Open Championship	Scotland	125,000	(United States) Jack Nicklaus (n/a)	Major championship
23 Jul	Dutch Open	Netherlands	30,300	(United States) Bob Byman (3)	
30 Jul	Braun German Open	West Germany	30,000	(Spain) Seve Ballesteros (6)	
6 Aug	Scandinavian Enterprise Open	Sweden	35,000	(Spain) Seve Ballesteros (7)	
6 Aug	PGA Championship	United States	US$300,000	(United States) John Mahaffey (n/a)	Major championship
12 Aug	Benson & Hedges International Open	England	50,000	(United States) Lee Trevino (n/a)	
27 Aug	Carroll's Irish Open	Ireland	50,000	(Scotland) Ken Brown (1)	
3 Sep	Swiss Open	Switzerland	50,000	(Spain) Seve Ballesteros (8)	
17 Sep	Tournament Players Championship	England	40,000	(England) Brian Waites (1)	
7 Oct	Dunlop Masters	Wales	40,000	(England) Tommy Horton (4)	
22 Oct	European Open Championship	England	105,000	(United States) Bobby Wadkins (n/a)	New tournament

=== Unofficial events ===
The following events were sanctioned by the European Tour, but did not carry official money, nor were wins official.

Date	Tournament	Host country	Purse (£)	Winner(s)	Notes
24 Jun	Sumrie-Bournemouth Better-Ball	England	20,000	(Republic of Ireland) Eamonn Darcy and (Republic of Ireland) Christy O'Connor Jnr	Team event
10 Sep	Donald Swaelens Memorial Tournament	Belgium	n/a	(England) Nick Faldo	Limited-field event
23 Sep	Hennessy Cognac Cup	France	n/a	Team GB&I	Team event
15 Oct	Cacharel World Under-25 Championship	France	n/a	(Canada) Jim Nelford	
15 Oct	Colgate World Match Play Championship	England	130,000	(Japan) Isao Aoki	Limited-field event
22 Oct	Trophée Lancôme	France	50,000	(United States) Lee Trevino	Limited-field event
3 Dec	World Cup	United States	n/a	(United States) John Mahaffey and (United States) Andy North	Team event
3 Dec	World Cup Individual Trophy	United States	n/a	(United States) John Mahaffey	

== Order of Merit ==
The Order of Merit was based on tournament results during the season, calculated using a points-based system.

Position	Player	Points	Prize money (£)
1	(Spain) Seve Ballesteros	47,178	54,348
2	(South Africa) Dale Hayes	30,205	43,891
3	(England) Nick Faldo	28,496	37,912
4	(Scotland) Ken Brown	24,929	29,843
5	(England) Howard Clark	24,474	32,739
6	(England) Neil Coles	23,151	30,348
7	(England) Mark James	19,020	27,861
8	(Scotland) Brian Barnes	18,105	23,386
9	(Scotland) Bernard Gallacher	17,715	21,812
10	(England) Tommy Horton	16,265	18,007

== Awards ==
Award	Winner	Ref.
Sir Henry Cotton Rookie of the Year	(Scotland) Sandy Lyle	
