= Aubrey Boomer =

Jersey professional golfer

- Boomer, c. 1915

Personal information
- Full name: Aubrey Basil Boomer
- Nationality: Jersey
- Born: 1 November 1897 Grouville, Jersey
- Died: 2 October 1989 (aged 91) Brussels, Belgium

Career
- Sport: Golf
- Status: Professional
- Professional wins: 23

Best results in major championships
- Masters Tournament: DNP
- PGA Championship: DNP
- U.S. Open: T31: 1927
- The Open Championship: T2: 1927

Aubrey Basil Boomer (1 November 1897 – 2 October 1989) was a professional golfer who played in the early 20th century. Boomer had three top-10 finishes in the Open Championship. He was a frequent competitor in the French Open and won the event five times.

== Early life ==
Boomer was born on 1 November 1897 and grew up in Jersey. His father George was a school teacher in Grouville and had, in 1902, designed the La Moye Golf Club. Aubrey's brother Percy (1885–1949) was also a professional golfer.

== Golf career ==
=== Ryder Cup ===
Boomer played in the first two Ryder Cup matches. In the 1927 Ryder Cup contested at Worcester Country Club in Massachusetts the British team was defeated 9½–2½. At his death he was the last surviving member of the 1927 British team, although he was out-lived by Gene Sarazen.

=== French Open ===
Boomer won the French Open five times, in 1921, 1922, 1926, 1929, and 1931. In the 1921 French Open, Boomer won in a playoff against Arnaud Massy, his former golf teacher. Massy picked up his ball on the 34th hole after being 8 shots behind after 33 holes. Massy had been 3 shots up after 9 holes. In his 1929 victory he beat the St Cloud course record with a score of 61. Horton Smith was second with Gene Sarazen third.

In the 1922 French Open he beat the La Boulie course record, scoring 65 in the third round. Boomer won by 9 strokes from Eugène Lafitte, setting a record score for any national championship.

=== Belgian Open ===
Boomer twice finished second in the Belgian Open, in 1920 and 1924. In the 1924 tournament he came second on 146. Walter Hagen won with a score of 143. In 1926, one of his best years, he finally broke through and won the event.

=== 1924 Open Championship ===
The 1924 Open Championship was held 26–27 June at Royal Liverpool Golf Club in Hoylake, England. Walter Hagen won the second of his four Open Championships, one stroke ahead of runner-up Ernest Whitcombe. Boomer finished tied for sixth place in the event.

=== 1927 Open Championship ===
The 1927 Open Championship was held 13–15 July at the Old Course at St Andrews in St Andrews, Scotland. Amateur Bobby Jones successfully defended the title with a six-stroke victory, the second of his three victories at the Open Championship. Boomer and Fred Robson tied for second place, six shots back.

== Death ==
He suffered a stroke in Cannes and died later in Brussels on 2 October 1989.

== Tournament wins ==
This list may be incomplete

- 1921 Open de France
- 1922 Open de France, Belgian Open
- 1923 Letchworth Tournament
- 1924 Dutch Open, Saint-Germain Open Tournament
- 1925 Dutch Open, Roehampton Tournament, Saint-Germain Open Tournament
- 1926 Dutch Open, Open de France, Belgian Open, Daily Mail Tournament, Glasgow Herald Tournament, Saint-Germain Open Tournament
- 1927 Dutch Open, South Open (Argentina), Saint-Germain Open Tournament
- 1928 Grand Prix PGA France
- 1929 Open de France
- 1931 Open de France
- 1932 Italian Open
- 1936 Grand Prix PGA France
- 1938 Grand Prix PGA France

== Results in major championships ==
Tournament	1921	1922	1923	1924	1925	1926	1927	1928	1929	1930	1931	1932	1933	1934	1935	1936	1937	1938
U.S. Open							T31	T36			CUT							
The Open Championship	T26	T17		T6	T26	CUT	T2	T6	T15		T21		T18	CUT	T12	T15	T32	CUT

Note: Boomer never played in the Masters Tournament nor the PGA Championship.

Top 10
Did not play

CUT = missed the half-way cut
"T" indicates a tie for a place

== Team appearances ==
- Great Britain vs USA (representing Great Britain): 1926 (winners)
- Ryder Cup (representing Great Britain): 1927, 1929 (winners)
- France–Great Britain Professional Match (representing Great Britain): 1929 (winners)
