= Cawder Golf Club =

Scottish golf club

Coordinates: 55.927°N 4.233°W

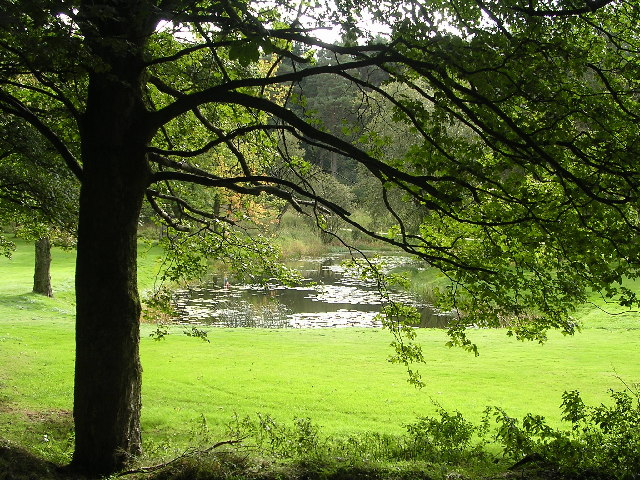
- Pictured 2005

Club information
- Type: Private
- Owned by: Derwent London
- Total holes: 36
- Website: https://cawdergolfclub.com

Cawder Golf Club is a golf course in Bishopbriggs, East Dunbartonshire, Scotland. The 6,297 yard Championship course was designed by James Braid in the 1930s. The course has undergone several refurbishments since its inception, most recently in 1981. A smaller course, the Keir course also exists at the club. The course hosted the 1987 and 1988 Bowring Ladies Scottish Opens. In 2025, the course hosted the Cawder 36-hole Challenge. The property is owned by Derwent London.

The golf club lies on the grounds of Cawder House, built in 1814. The historic property sits on the site of the former Castle of Cadder. A courtyard stable complex, built in the early 19th century, also exists on the site and is named to the Buildings at Risk register.

The Forth and Clyde Canal runs adjacent to the property. In 2015, the body of a man was recovered from the water near the property. In 2022, a man went into the water from the course and later died after getting into difficulty.

== See also ==
- Cawder Challenge, former golf event held at the club
- Triangular Professional Tournament, held at Cawder in 1937
- Sunderland of Scotland Masters, held at Cawder from 1997 to 1999
