= Aberdare Golf Club =

Golf club in Rhondda Cynon Taf, Wales

- Aberdare Golf Club within Wales
- 51.71981°N 3.428695°W

Club information
- Location: Rhondda Cynon Taf, Wales
- Established: 1921
- Type: Golf Club
- Tota holes: 18
- Website: aberdaregolfclub.co.uk
- Length: White Block - 5875 yards
- Length: Yellow Block - 5767 yards
- Length: Red Block - 5189 yards

Aberdare Golf Club (Welsh: Clwb Golff Aberdar) is a golf club based just outside Aberdare at Rhondda Cynon Taf, Wales. It was founded in 1921 as a parkland course at Abernant, about a mile from Aberdare and is an 18-hole golf course famous for its mature oak trees. Dai Rees, who was former Ryder Cup Captain is a member and who started his career at the club as an Assistant Professional at the age of 16. The course, in summer months, plays as a Par 69 consisting of 3 par 5's, 9 par 4's and 6 par 3 's.

The club is open to both members and visitors and also welcomes society days.

Practice green: Yes

Practice nets: Yes
