= Marcel Dallemagne =

French professional golfer

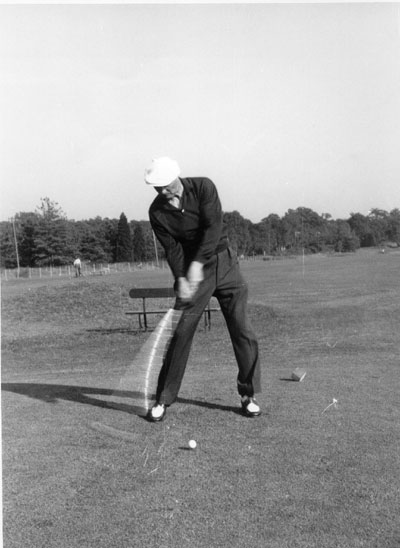

Personal information
- Full name: Marcel Dallemagne
- Nationality: France
- Born: 11 December 1898 Le Port-Marly, France
- Died: 30 December 1994 (aged 96) Ménétréol-sur-Sauldre, France

Career
- Sport: Golf
- Status: Professional
- Professional wins: 18

Best results in major championships
- Masters Tournament: DNP
- PGA Championship: DNP
- U.S. Open: DNP
- The Open Championship: T3: 1936

Marcel Dallemagne (11 December 1898 – 30 December 1994) was a French professional golfer.

== Career ==
Dallemagne won several prestigious tournaments in Europe in the 1930s and 1940s.

== Professional wins (18) ==
This list may be incomplete.

- 1927 Belgian Open
- 1930 French Closed Championship
- 1932 French Closed Championship
- 1931 Swiss Open
- 1933 Dutch Open
- 1935 French Closed Championship
- 1936 French Open
- 1937 Italian Open, French Open, Swiss Open, Belgian Open, French PGA Championship, French Closed Championship
- 1938 French Open
- 1939 French PGA Championship, French Closed Championship
- 1948 French PGA Championship
- 1949 Swiss Open

== Results in major championships ==
Tournament	1928	1929	1930	1931	1932	1933	1934	1935	1936	1937	1938
The Open Championship	CUT		T32	T17	T36		T4		T3	T26	T23

Note: Dallemagne only played in The Open Championship.

Top 10
Did not play

CUT = missed the half-way cut
"T" indicates a tie for a place

== Team appearances ==
- France–Great Britain Professional Match (representing France): 1929
