= Auguste Boyer =

French professional golfer (1896–1956)

Auguste Boyer (13 March 1896 – 21 October 1956) was a French professional golfer.

== Professional career ==
Boyer was prominent on the European circuit in the 1920s and 1930s. He won four Italian Opens, four German Opens, three Swiss Opens, two Belgian Opens, and one Dutch Open. He also finished runner-up three times in his home French Open.

== Personal life ==
Boyer was born in Cagnes-sur-Mer and died in Nice.

== Tournament wins (16) ==
this list may be incomplete

- 1926 Italian Open
- 1928 Italian Open
- 1930 German Open, Italian Open, Swiss Open
- 1931 Italian Open
- 1932 Dutch Open, German Open
- 1933 Belgian Open, French PGA Championship
- 1934 Swiss Open
- 1935 German Open, Swiss Open, Addington Foursomes (with Francis Francis)
- 1936 Belgian Open, German Open

== Team appearances ==
- France-Great Britain Professional Match (representing France): 1929
- Continental Europe-United States Match (non-playing captain): 1953
