= Dai Rees =

Welsh professional golfer (1913–1983)

Dai Rees CBE
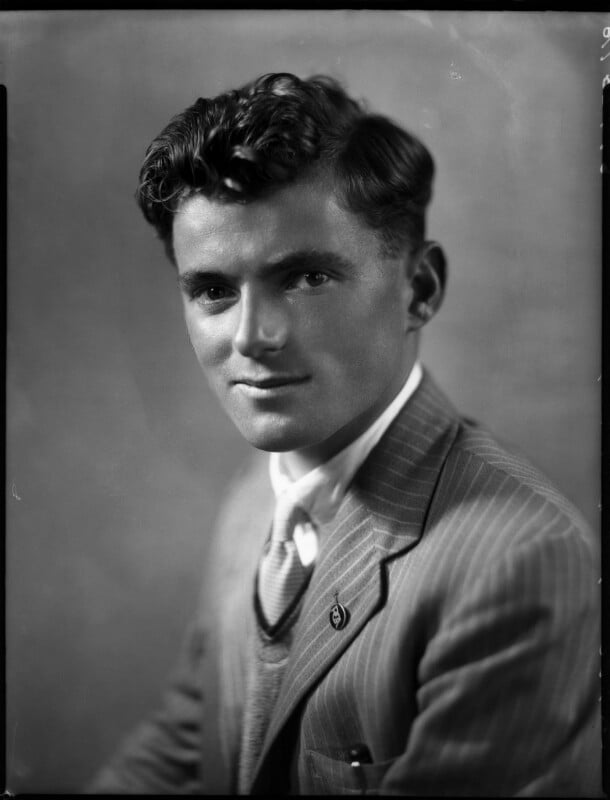
- Rees in 1936

Personal information
- Full name: David James Rees
- Nationality: Wales
- Born: 31 March 1913 Font-y-Gary, Glamorgan, Wales
- Died: 15 November 1983 (aged 70) Barnet, London, England
- Height: 5 ft 7 in (1.70 m)

Career
- Sport: Golf
- Turned professional: 1929
- Former tour: European Tour
- Professional wins: 43

Best results in major championships
- Masters Tournament: DNP
- PGA Championship: DNP
- U.S. Open: DNP
- The Open Championship: 2nd/T2: 1953, 1954, 1961

Achievements and awards
- Commander of the Order of the British Empire: 1958
- Harry Vardon Trophy: 1955, 1959

David James Rees, CBE (31 March 1913 – 15 November 1983) was one of Britain's leading golfers either side of the Second World War.

The winner of many prestigious tournaments in Britain, Europe and farther afield, Rees is best remembered as the captain of the Great Britain Ryder Cup team which defeated the United States at Lindrick Golf Club in Yorkshire, England, in 1957. It was the only defeat which the United States suffered in the competition between 1933 and 1985.

== Early life ==
In 1913, Rees was born in Fontegary, near Barry in the Vale of Glamorgan, Wales. He was brought up around golf, with his father being the head professional and his mother a steward at The Leys Golf Club. His family moved to Aberdare, where his father had taken up the position of head professional at Aberdare Golf Club.

During World War II, Rees served as a driver for Air vice-marshal Harry Broadhurst.

== Professional career ==
In 1929, Rees began his professional career aged 16 as an assistant to his father at Aberdare Golf Club. He moved to Whitchurch Golf Club near Cardiff and then to Surbiton Golf Club in early 1935. His first post as a full professional was at Hindhead Golf Club in 1938 where he remained until he took over as the professional at South Herts Golf Club in 1946. Like Harry Vardon before him, he remained in the position until he died in 1983.

Rees won many important tournaments around the world including four News of the World Match Plays, two British Masters, the Irish, Belgian and Swiss Opens, and the South African PGA Championship.

Rees never won The Open Championship but finished as runner-up three times, in 1953, 1954 and 1961. He had a good chance of victory in 1946, when he shot a final round 80 to slip into a tie for fourth place.

Rees continued to play at a competitive level in his "senior" years, and remained successful, especially in match play tournaments. He reached the final of the News of the World Match Play twice while in his fifties, in 1967 and again in 1969, on each occasion beating several players almost half his age over 18 holes. He also had some success in stroke play tournaments, including a runner-up finish in the Martini International in 1973 when aged 60.

Rees played in nine Ryder Cups in total, and was selected for the aborted 1939 Cup. He had a 7–10–1 win–loss–draw record.

Rees captained the Great Britain Ryder Cup team on five occasions, in 1955, 1957, 1959, 1961 and 1967. It was at the 1957 event at Lindrick where Britain scored a 7½–4½ victory to break the United States' stranglehold on the trophy they had held since 1933. Having regained the Ryder Cup in 1959, the United States would not relinquish it again until 1985, by which time the British team had been expanded to include the rest of Europe.

== Awards ==
- In 1957, following Britain's triumph in the Ryder Cup, Rees won the BBC Sports Personality of the Year award, perhaps Britain's best known sports award.
- He was made a Commander of the Order of the British Empire (CBE) in the 1958 New Year Honours for services to golf.

== Death ==
In 1983, Rees was involved in a car crash on his way back from watching an Arsenal football match. He died several months later, aged 70, having failed to recover from his injuries.

== Tournament wins ==
this list may be incomplete

- 1935 Daily Mirror Assistants' Tournament
- 1936 News of the World Match Play, Daily Mirror Assistants' Tournament, Surrey Open Championship
- 1937 Sunningdale Foursomes (with Stanley Anderson)
- 1938 News of the World Match Play
- 1939 Yorkshire Evening News Tournament, Addington Foursomes (with Alfred Critchley)
- 1946 Silver King Tournament, Spalding Tournament
- 1947 Penfold Tournament (tie with Reg Whitcombe and Norman Von Nida), Daily Mail Tournament, News Chronicle Tournament
- 1948 Irish Open
- 1949 News of the World Match Play
- 1950 Yorkshire Evening News Tournament, News Chronicle Tournament, News of the World Match Play, Dunlop Masters
- 1951 Royal Canberra Professional Purse, New South Wales Jubilee Open, Yorkshire Evening News Tournament (tie with Norman Von Nida)
- 1952 Wiseman's Tournament, Yorkshire Evening News Tournament
- 1953 Daks Tournament
- 1954 Spalding Tournament, Belgian Open, Southern Professional Championship
- 1956 Swiss Open, Yorkshire Evening News Tournament (tie with Ken Bousfield)
- 1958 Dunlop South African Professional Match Play
- 1959 PGA Close Championship, Swiss Open, Sherwood Forest Foursomes Tournament (with Dennis Smalldon)
- 1960 Hammonds-Carling Jubilee Tournament, Gleneagles Hotel Foursomes Tournament (with W Glennie)
- 1962 Dunlop Masters, Daks Tournament (tie with Bob Charles)
- 1963 Swiss Open
- 1966 PGA Seniors Championship, Southern Professional Championship
- 1970 Beefeater Tournament (Bermuda)
- 1975 Southern Professional Championship

== Results in major championships ==
Tournament	1935	1936	1937	1938	1939
The Open Championship	T31	11	T21	T13	12

Tournament	1940	1941	1942	1943	1944	1945	1946	1947	1948	1949
The Open Championship	NT	NT	NT	NT	NT	NT	T4	T21	T15	CUT

Tournament	1950	1951	1952	1953	1954	1955	1956	1957	1958	1959
The Open Championship	T3	T12	T27	T2	T2	T27	T13	T30	T14	T9

Tournament	1960	1961	1962	1963	1964	1965	1966	1967	1968	1969
The Open Championship	T9	2	CUT	T42	T38	CUT	36	CUT		CUT

Tournament	1970	1971	1972	1973	1974
The Open Championship		CUT			CUT

Note: Rees only played in The Open Championship.

Top 10
Did not play

NT = No tournament
CUT = missed the half-way cut (3rd round cut in 1969 and 1971 Open Championships)
"T" indicates a tie for a place

== Team appearances ==
- Ryder Cup (representing Great Britain): 1937, 1947, 1949, 1951, 1953, 1955 (captain), 1957 (winners, captain), 1959 (captain), 1961 (captain), 1967 (non-playing captain)
- Canada Cup (representing Wales): 1954, 1956, 1957, 1958, 1959, 1960, 1961, 1962, 1964
- Coronation Match (representing the Ladies and Professionals): 1937
- Triangular Professional Tournament (representing Wales): 1937
- Llandudno International Golf Trophy (representing Wales): 1938
- Great Britain–Argentina Professional Match (representing Great Britain): 1939 (winners)
- Joy Cup (representing the British Isles): 1954 (winners), 1955 (winners), 1958 (winners, captain)
- Slazenger Trophy (representing Great Britain and Ireland): 1956 (winners)
- Amateurs–Professionals Match (representing the Professionals): 1956 (winners), 1957 (winners), 1958, 1959 (winners), 1960 (winners)
- R.T.V. International Trophy (representing Wales): 1967 (captain)
- Double Diamond International (representing Wales): 1971 (captain), 1972 (captain), 1973 (captain), 1975 (captain), 1976 (captain)
