= Percy Alliss =

English professional golfer (1897–1975)

Personal information
- Nationality: England
- Born: 8 January 1897 Sheffield, England
- Died: 31 March 1975 (aged 78) Bournemouth, England

Career
- Sport: Golf
- Status: Professional
- Professional wins: 25

Best results in major championships
- Masters Tournament: DNP
- PGA Championship: DNP
- U.S. Open: T46: 1931
- The Open Championship: T3: 1931

Percy Alliss (8 January 1897 – 31 March 1975) was one of the leading English professional golfers in the 1920s and 1930s, winning many tournaments in Britain and Continental Europe. He was also the father of commentator and former golfer Peter Alliss.

== Biography ==
Alliss was born in Sheffield. He became an assistant professional at the Royal Porthcawl Golf Club in South Wales in 1919, and his first notable professional wins came in September 1920 when he won the Assistant Professionals Tournament and the Welsh Professional Championship in successive weeks.

Alliss was professional at Clyne Golf Club from 1921 to 1923, at Wanstead Golf Club from 1923 to 1925, Wannsee Golf Club, Berlin from 1926 to 1931, Beaconsfield Golf Club from 1932 to 1936 and Temple Newsam Golf Club from 1936 to 1938. He then became the professional at Ferndown Golf Club in Dorset in early 1939, where he stayed until his retirement in 1967.

Alliss finished in the top six at The Open Championship in 1928, 1929, 1931, 1932 and 1936. He played in the Ryder Cup in 1929, 1933, 1935 and 1937. He was not eligible in 1931 as he was employed in Germany at that time and the Ryder Cup rules had changed to require British players to be living in Great Britain. His son Peter was also a professional golfer, golf writer and broadcaster, and played in the Ryder Cup eight times. The Allisses were the first father and son pair to play in the Ryder Cup, and so far Antonio and Ignacio Garrido are the only other.

In 1935, Alliss shot a 262 aggregate on his way to winning the Italian Open. The total established the lowest 72-hole total ever.

Alliss had limited play in North America, but did finished regulation tied for the lead at the 1931 Canadian Open. He ultimately lost an 18-hole playoff to Walter Hagen.

== Personal life ==
Alliss was the father of golfer and broadcaster Peter Alliss.

Alliss died in Bournemouth at the age of 78.

== Professional wins ==
this list may be incomplete

- 1920 Perrier Water Assistant Professionals' Tournament, Welsh Professional Championship
- 1921 Welsh Open Championship
- 1923 Essex Professional Championship
- 1925 Essex Professional Championship
- 1926 German Open
- 1927 German Open, Italian Open, German PGA Championship
- 1928 German Open, German PGA Championship
- 1929 German Open
- 1931 Båstad Open Invitation Tournament
- 1932 Penfold-Porthcawl Tournament
- 1933 German Open, News of the World Match Play
- 1935 Italian Open, Scottish Open Championship
- 1936 Morecambe-Penfold Northern Open Championship, Yorkshire Open
- 1937 Northern Professional Championship, Yorkshire Open, Yorkshire Professional Championship, News of the World Match Play
- 1938 Penfold Professional Golf League

== Results in major championships ==
Tournament	1921	1922	1923	1924	1925	1926	1927	1928	1929
U.S. Open									
The Open Championship	T39	10	T33		T6		T10	T4	T4

Tournament	1930	1931	1932	1933	1934	1935	1936	1937	1938	1939
U.S. Open		T46								
The Open Championship	T17	T3	T4		T9	T16	T5	T15		T9

Tournament	1940	1941	1942	1943	1944	1945	1946	1947	1948	1949
U.S. Open			NT	NT	NT	NT				
The Open Championship	NT	NT	NT	NT	NT	NT	17		CUT	CUT

Note: Alliss only played in The Open Championship and the U.S. Open.

Top 10
Did not play

NT = No tournament
CUT = missed the half-way cut
"T" indicates a tie for a place

== Team appearances ==
- Ryder Cup (representing Great Britain): 1929 (winners), 1933 (winners), 1935, 1937
- France–Great Britain Professional Match (representing Great Britain): 1929 (winners)
- England–Scotland Professional Match (representing England): 1932 (winners), 1933 (winners), 1934 (winners), 1935 (winners), 1936 (winners), 1937 (winners)
- England–Ireland Professional Match (representing England): 1932 (winners)
- Llandudno International Golf Trophy (representing England): 1938 (captain, winners)
