= Athletics in Wales =

Athletics has a long history in Wales, with many events recognised today codified during the Victorian period. The first amateur athletic clubs in Wales were formed in the 1870s, while the first championships began in the early 20th century. Wales began competing as a country in international athletic events in the 1920s and has since produced a notable number of world class sportspeople including many medal winning Commonwealth, World, Olympic, Paralympic and European champions. Wales competes in the Commonwealth Games under its own flag but at the Olympic Games, Welsh athletes compete alongside those of Scotland, England and Northern Ireland as part of a Great Britain team.

== History ==
The history of athletics in Wales, primarily the fundamental sporting activities of running, jumping and throwing, can be traced back to ancient times. The 12th century chronicler Gerald of Wales makes reference to climbing and running as part of improving fitness in preparation for war. By the 15th century several references are made to The Twenty Four Feats of Skill, a list of attributes that were expected from the princes of Wales, a form of chivalric code. Jumping and running are listed amongst the feats.

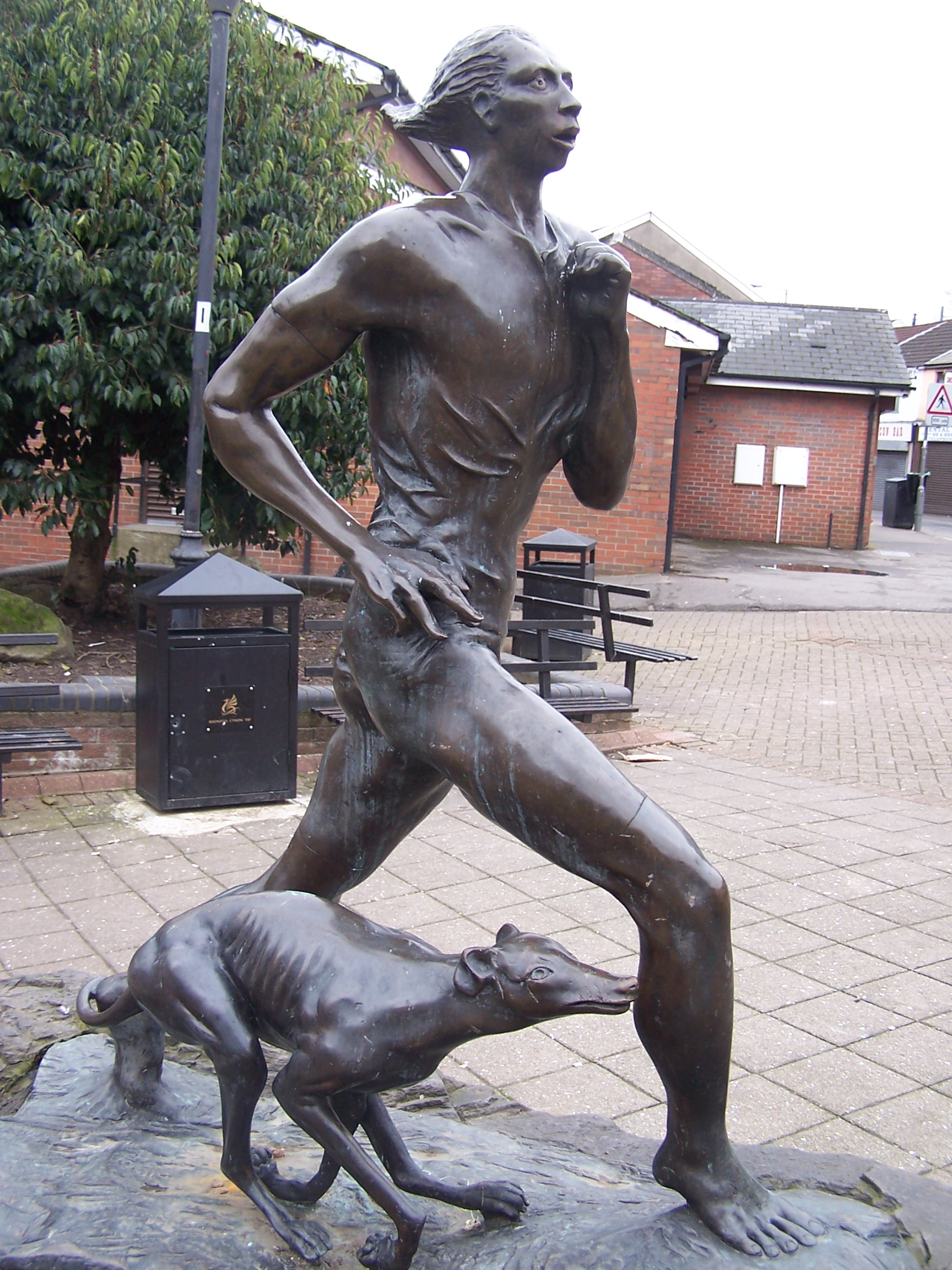
Statue of Guto Nyth Brân in Mountain Ash

Pre-industrialisation, athletic meets were a traditional events on the sporting calendar. The most notable Welsh athlete of this period was Guto Nyth Brân, a runner noted for his incredible long distance stamina. His feats are commemorated each year in the Nos Galan road race, held at Mountain Ash.

During the early 19th century, a more structured form of athletics began to appear. Pedestrianism, in which people were allowed to wager on long distance competitive walking and running events, brought a standardising of athletics which reflected the modernisation of Welsh industrial society. In the second half of the 19th century the Victorian middle-classes began to organise and codify a range of sports. At the forefront of the codification of sports was Welshman John Graham Chambers, who although more famed for devising the Queensberry Rules for boxing, also formed the Amateur Athletic Club in 1866, and was present at the formation of the Amateur Athletic Association in 1880. Chambers championed athletics in Wales and organised the country's first Athletics meeting, held at Hafod Estate in Cwmystwyth near Aberystwyth in 1860. In 1875, the Newport Athletic Club was formed, the first in Wales. (Note: The date of formation of Newport Athletics club, originally called the Newport Cricket, Athletic and Football Club, is contested by several sources. Archives Network Wales states 1875, while The Welsh Academy Encyclopaedia of Wales (2008) returns a date of 1877 (p.41). David Smith in his study of the Welsh Rugby Union, Field of Dreams(1980) states that Richard Mullock was secretary of Newport Athletic Club since 1874 (p.36).) This was followed in 1882 with the creation of Cardiff Roath Harriers, the first pure athletics club in the country with no connections to other winter sports. By the late 19th century professional races were an established means for men to earn money. The Wales rugby captain Arthur Gould, who was also a notable sprinter and hurdler, had by 1890 amassed over £1,000 in foot races alone.

The 1890s saw formalized track, field and cross-country contests throughout Wales and the country's first amateur athletics event was held in 1893. In 1896 the Welsh Cross-Country Association was formed. This was followed in 1901 by the Welsh Professional Union, a body designed to promote and control professional foot and cycle racing in south Wales. Professional athletics continued to develop in Wales and in 1903 the Welsh Powderhall, named after the famous stadium in Edinburgh, was established in Pontypridd and held at Taff Vale Park. The first Welsh Powderhall had a prize of £100, and the venue became the home of Welsh professional running until its final contest in 1934. In 1907 the first fully integrated athletics championship were held at Rodney Parade in Newport, and by the 1920s Wales was competing as a nation on the international stage.

The Second World War led to a temporary cessation of competition, but Welsh athletics continued to develop after the war when the Welsh Secondary School AAA was formed in 1946 followed by the first Wales Schools Track and Field Championships in 1947. The Welsh Amateur Athletics Association formed in 1948, the first organisation to govern the sport of track and field throughout Wales, and in 1952 women were first allowed to compete in the Welsh championships.

The 1950s also witnessed an improvement of the infrastructure of Welsh sport, with the first purpose built athletics venue, Maindy Stadium, opened in 1951 in Cardiff. The stadium held its first international competition, against Ireland, in 1954. In 1958 Cardiff was the host city for the British Empire and Commonwealth Games.

The Isle of Anglesey is a member island of the International Island Games Association. In the 2015 Island Games, held on Jersey, the Isle of Anglesey came 13th in the medal table with five gold and three bronze medals, won in sailing and athletics.

== Notable Welsh athletes ==
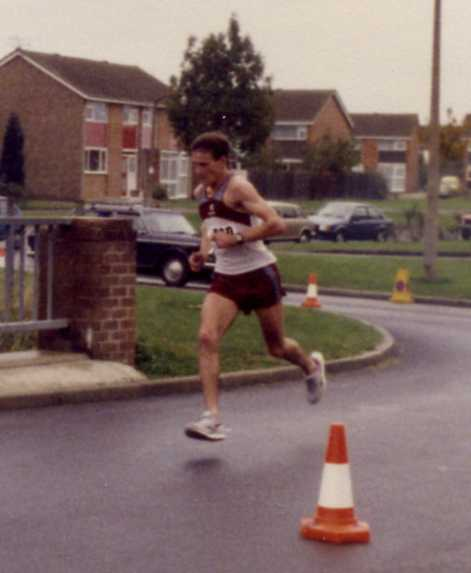
Marathon runner Steve Jones in 1984

Although Wales only began competing as a country in various athletic tournaments since the 1920s, Welsh athletes have made an impression on the international stage before this as part of Great Britain teams along with sportspeople from England, Scotland and Northern Ireland. In 1906 Wallis Walters became the first Welsh athlete to represent Great Britain in a track and field event in the Olympics, competing in the 110m hurdles. The first Welsh athlete to win an Olympic medal was David Jacobs who was awarded the gold as part of the 4 × 100 m relay at the 1912 games in Stockholm. In 1948, Tom Richards became the first Welshman to be awarded an individual medal when he took silver in the marathon. Michelle Probert was the first woman from Wales to win an Olympic medal, running in the 4 × 400 m relay, while no female athlete from Wales has won an individual Olympic medal.

Some of the more notable Welsh athletes include Lynn Davies, gold medalist in the long jump in the 1964 Summer Olympics. Nicknamed 'Lynn the Leap', Davies was also the flagbearer for the Great Britain team in the 1968 games and is the only Welsh athlete to have won gold in an individual Olympic track and field event. 110m hurdler Colin Jackson is a former world record holder and the winner of numerous Olympic, World and European medals. Marathoner Steve Jones set the world record for the marathon in Chicago in 1984 with a time of 2:08:05. He also won a bronze medal at the Commonwealth games in the 10,000m in 1986.

Ralph Evans won a bronze medal for boxing in the light fly-weight division in the 1972 Summer Olympics, but only boxed for 3 years and retired at the age of 19. Ralph was the first Welshman to win an Olympic medal in boxing. Wales has also produced Great Britain's most successful Paralympian, Dame Tanni Grey-Thompson. Grey-Thompson won 16 Paralympic medals between 1988 and 2004 in wheelchair track events, ten of the medals were gold. She has also won gold in two world championships and has won the women's wheelchair race at the London Marathon on six occasions.

== See also ==
- List of Welsh records in athletics

== Bibliography ==
- Davies, John; Jenkins, Nigel (2008). The Welsh Academy Encyclopaedia of Wales. Cardiff: University of Wales Press. ISBN 978-0-7083-1953-6.
