= 1981 European Tour =

Golf tour season

1981 European Tour season
- Duration: 9 April 1981 – 4 October 1981
- Number of official events: 22
- Most wins: (Spain) Seve Ballesteros (2) (West Germany) Bernhard Langer (2) (Scotland) Sandy Lyle (2) (Australia) Greg Norman (2) (Spain) Manuel Piñero (2)
- Official money list: (West Germany) Bernhard Langer
- Sir Henry Cotton Rookie of the Year: (England) Jeremy Bennett

The 1981 European Tour, titled as the 1981 PGA European Golf Tour, was the 10th season of the European Tour, the main professional golf tour in Europe since its inaugural season in 1972.

== Changes for 1981 ==
The season was made up of 22 tournaments counting for the Official money list, and some non-counting tournaments later known as "Approved Special Events".

There were several changes from the previous season, with the addition of the Lawrence Batley International, and the loss of the Newcastle Brown "900" Open and the Merseyside International Open.

=== Rule changes ===
The local rule that had been introduced on the tour in 1976 which allowed spike marks to be repaired was rescinded, and a local rule that prohibited touching of the line of a putt with a club was introduced.

== Schedule ==
The following table lists official events during the 1981 season.

Date	Tournament	Host country	Purse (£)	Winner (Note: The number in brackets after each winner's name is the number of European Tour events they had won up to and including that tournament. This information is only shown for European Tour members and are inclusive of the three United States-based major championships which were included on the schedule for the first time in 1998, with earlier editions having retrospectively been recognised as official tour wins.)	Notes
12 Apr	Masters Tournament	United States	US$365,000	(United States) Tom Watson (5)	Major championship (Note: Unofficial money event at the time, but retrospectively counted as an official win.)
26 Apr	Madrid Open	Spain	37,500	(Spain) Manuel Piñero (5)	
3 May	Italian Open	Italy	45,000	(Spain) José María Cañizares (4)	
10 May	Paco Rabanne Open de France	France	37,500	(Scotland) Sandy Lyle (5)	
17 May	Martini International	England	65,000	(Australia) Greg Norman (5)	
25 May	Sun Alliance PGA Championship	England	70,000	(England) Nick Faldo (4)	
31 May	Dunlop Masters	England	75,000	(Australia) Greg Norman (6)	
7 Jun	Lawrence Batley International	England	60,000	(Scotland) Sandy Lyle (6)	New tournament
14 Jun	Cold Shield Greater Manchester Open	England	40,000	(Scotland) Bernard Gallacher (7)	
21 Jun	Billy Butlin Jersey Open	Jersey	45,000	(England) Tony Jacklin (7)	
21 Jun	U.S. Open	United States	US$360,000	(Australia) David Graham (n/a)	Major championship
28 Jun	Coral Classic	Wales	40,000	(Republic of Ireland) Des Smyth (4)	
5 Jul	Scandinavian Enterprise Open	Sweden	50,000	(Spain) Seve Ballesteros (15)	
11 Jul	State Express Classic	England	65,000	(Australia) Rodger Davis (1)	
19 Jul	The Open Championship	England	200,000	(United States) Bill Rogers (n/a)	Major championship
26 Jul	KLM Dutch Open	Netherlands	40,000	(South Africa) Harold Henning (1)	
2 Aug	German Open	West Germany	40,000	(West Germany) Bernhard Langer (2)	
9 Aug	PGA Championship	United States	US$400,000	(United States) Larry Nelson (n/a)	Major championship
16 Aug	Carroll's Irish Open	Ireland	80,000	(Scotland) Sam Torrance (3)	
23 Aug	Benson & Hedges International Open	England	90,000	(United States) Tom Weiskopf (1)	
30 Aug	Swiss Open	Switzerland	55,000	(Spain) Manuel Piñero (6)	
6 Sep	Dixcel Tissues European Open	England	105,000	(Australia) Graham Marsh (8)	
13 Sep	Haig Whisky TPC	Scotland	60,000	(Scotland) Brian Barnes (9)	
27 Sep	Bob Hope British Classic	England	90,000	(West Germany) Bernhard Langer (3)	Pro-Am
4 Oct	Benson & Hedges Spanish Open	Spain	50,000	(Spain) Seve Ballesteros (16)	

=== Unofficial events ===
The following events were sanctioned by the European Tour, but did not carry official money, nor were wins official.

Date	Tournament	Host country	Purse (£)	Winner(s)	Notes
20 Sep	Ryder Cup	England	n/a	Team USA	Team event
11 Oct	Suntory World Match Play Championship	England	100,000	(Spain) Seve Ballesteros	Limited-field event
18 Oct	Trophée Lancôme	France	45,000	(Australia) David Graham	
25 Oct	Cacharel World Under-25 Championship	France	n/a	(United States) Tim Simpson	

== Official money list ==
The official money list was based on prize money won during the season, calculated in Pound sterling.

Position	Player	Prize money (£)
1	(West Germany) Bernhard Langer	81,036
2	(England) Nick Faldo	48,108
3	(Scotland) Sandy Lyle	44,732
4	(Australia) Greg Norman	44,254
5	(Spain) Manuel Piñero	39,640
6	(Scotland) Sam Torrance	36,012
7	(Spain) Seve Ballesteros	35,154
8	(Republic of Ireland) Des Smyth	29,105
9	(Republic of Ireland) Eamonn Darcy	25,805
10	(Spain) José María Cañizares	25,529

== Awards ==
Award	Winner	Ref.
Sir Henry Cotton Rookie of the Year	(England) Jeremy Bennett	
