= Jersey Open =

Tournament information
- Location: Jersey
- Established: 1978
- Course: La Moye Golf Club
- Par: 72
- Tour: European Tour
- Format: Stroke play
- Prize fund: £300,000
- Month played: June
- Final year: 1995

Tournament record score
- Aggregate: 266 Paul Curry (1994)
- To par: −22 as above

Final champion
- (Scotland) Andrew Oldcorn
- Location in the Channel Islands Location in Jersey

The Jersey Open was a European Tour golf tournament which was played in Jersey, a British Crown dependency in the English Channel, from 1978 to 1995. It had several different names during this period. The venue was La Moye Golf Club. The winners included three major championship winners, Tony Jacklin, Sandy Lyle and Ian Woosnam. The prize fund peaked at £353,120 in 1994 before falling to £300,000 in the final year, which was below average for a European Tour event at that time. In 1996 a European Seniors Tour event which has been known at various times as the Jersey Seniors Open and by several sponsored names, was inaugurated at the same venue.

== Winners ==
Year	Winner	Score	To par	Margin of victory	Runner(s)-up
Jersey Open
1996	Cancelled				
DHL Jersey Open
1995	(Scotland) Andrew Oldcorn	273	−15	3 strokes	(Scotland) Dean Robertson
Jersey European Airways Open
1994	(England) Paul Curry	266	−22	3 strokes	(England) Mark James
1993	(South Africa) Ian Palmer	268	−20	2 strokes	(Scotland) Sam Torrance
1992	(Portugal) Daniel Silva	277	−11	2 strokes	(England) Chris Moody
1991	(Scotland) Sam Torrance	279	−9	1 stroke	(England) Mark Davis
1990	Cancelled due to lack of sponsorship				
1989	(Republic of Ireland) Christy O'Connor Jnr	281	−3	Playoff	(England) Denis Durnian
BNP Jersey Open
1988	(Republic of Ireland) Des Smyth	273	−15	Playoff	(England) Roger Chapman
Jersey Open
1987	(Wales) Ian Woosnam	279	−9	1 stroke	(United States) Bill Malley
1986	(England) John Morgan	275	−13	Playoff	(Australia) Peter Fowler
1985	(England) Howard Clark	279	−1	1 stroke	(England) Warren Humphreys (Wales) Philip Parkin (Wales) Ian Woosnam
1984	(Scotland) Bernard Gallacher	274	−14	2 strokes	(Scotland) Sandy Lyle
1983	(England) Jeff Hall	278	−10	1 stroke	(Scotland) Bernard Gallacher (England) Michael King
1982	(Scotland) Bernard Gallacher	273	−15	Playoff	(Republic of Ireland) Eamonn Darcy (Republic of Ireland) Des Smyth
Billy Butlin Jersey Open
1981	(England) Tony Jacklin	279	−9	1 stroke	(West Germany) Bernhard Langer
Avis Jersey Open
1980	(Spain) José María Cañizares	281	+1	2 strokes	(Scotland) Steve Martin
B.A./Avis Open
1979	(Scotland) Sandy Lyle	271	−13	3 strokes	(England) Howard Clark
1978	(Wales) Brian Huggett	271	−13	3 strokes	(Republic of Ireland) Eamonn Darcy

== See also ==
- Open golf tournament
