= Jaime Gonzalez (golfer) =

Brazilian professional golfer

Personal information
- Full name: Jaime Gonzalez
- Nationality: Brazil
- Born: 25 July 1954 (age 72) São Paulo, Brazil
- Height: 5 ft 10 in (1.78 m)

Career
- Sport: Golf
- College: Oklahoma State University
- Turned professional: 1977
- Former tours: PGA Tour; European Tour
- Professional wins: 2

Number of wins by tour
- European Tour: 1
- Other: 1

Best results in major championships
- Masters Tournament: DNP
- PGA Championship: DNP
- U.S. Open: DNP
- The Open Championship: T20: 1985

Jaime Gonzalez (born 25 July 1954) is a Brazilian professional golfer. He is one of the few from his country to have enjoyed success on the international circuit.

== Early life and amateur career ==
In 1954, Gonzalez was born in São Paulo to a golfing family. His father Mário won the Spanish Open as an amateur in 1947. Gonzalez had a lot of success an amateur, winning the Brazil Amateur Championship three times (1969, 1971, 1972) as a teenager. He would win the tournament one more time when he was in college.

Gonzalez attended Oklahoma State University in the United States and won the individual title at the 1974 Eisenhower Trophy.

== Professional career ==
In 1977, Gonzalez turned professional and shortly thereafter represented Brazil twice in the World Cup, in 1978 and 1979.

Gonzalez earned membership on the PGA Tour for three seasons: in 1978, 1980, 1981. However, he did not have much success. His only top ten was a T-5 at the 1980 Sammy Davis Jr.-Greater Hartford Open.

In 1982, he turned to Europe where he had much more success. He played on the European Tour between 1982 and 1987 and won an event, the 1984 St. Mellion Timeshare TPC. In addition, a month after his victory, he was in the top-10 of the 1984 Open Championship after the first two rounds. He eventually finished T-28. His rank on the European Tour Order of Merit was #16 that year, his best ever.

== Amateur wins ==
- 1969 Brazil Amateur Open Championship
- 1971 Brazil Amateur Open Championship
- 1972 Brazil Amateur Open Championship
- 1974 Eisenhower Trophy (individual winner)
- 1975 Sunnehanna Amateur
- 1976 Brazil Amateur Open Championship

== Professional wins (2) ==
=== European Tour wins (1) ===
No.	Date	Tournament	Winning score	Margin of victory	Runner-up
1	10 Jun 1984	St. Mellion Timeshare TPC	−15 (65-64-69-67=265)	Playoff	(England) Mark James

European Tour playoff record (1–0)

No.	Year	Tournament	Opponent	Result
1	1984	St. Mellion Timeshare TPC	(England) Mark James	Won with par on second extra hole

=== Other wins (1) ===
- 1980 Oklahoma Open

== Playoff record ==
Asia Golf Circuit playoff record (0–1)

No.	Year	Tournament	Opponents	Result
1	1979	Thailand Open	(United States) Mike Krantz	Lost to birdie on first extra hole

== Results in major championships ==
Tournament	1977	1978	1979	1980	1981	1982	1983	1984	1985	1986
The Open Championship	T43				T47	CUT	CUT	T28	T20	CUT

Note: Gonzalez only played in The Open Championship.

Did not play

CUT = missed the half-way cut
"T" = tied

== Team appearances ==
Amateur

- Eisenhower Trophy (representing Brazil): 1970, 1972, 1974 (joint individual leader), 1976

Professional

- World Cup (representing Brazil): 1978, 1979
- Hennessy Cognac Cup (representing the Rest of the World): 1982, 1984
- Dunhill Cup (representing Brazil): 1985

== See also ==
- Fall 1977 PGA Tour Qualifying School graduates
- Fall 1979 PGA Tour Qualifying School graduates
