= Daniel Silva (golfer) =

Portuguese golfer

Personal information
- Nationality: Portugal
- Born: 19 June 1966 (age 60) Johannesburg, South Africa
- Height: 1.67 m (5 ft 6 in)
- Weight: 70 kg (150 lb; 11 st)

Career
- Sport: Golf
- Turned professional: 1988
- Former tour: European Tour
- Professional wins: 1

Number of wins by tour
- European Tour: 1

Best results in major championships
- Masters Tournament: DNP
- PGA Championship: DNP
- U.S. Open: DNP
- The Open Championship: T80: 1991

Daniel Silva (born 19 June 1966) is a Portuguese professional golfer.

== Early life ==
Silva was born in Johannesburg, South Africa.

== Professional career ==
In 1988, Silva turned professional. He spent the next decade attempting to hold down a place on the European Tour. He was a regular visitor to qualifying school, where he came out with the number one card in 1990. He followed up that success with two solid seasons back to back in 1991 and 1992, which were the only years that he made the top one hundred on the Order of Merit, before being setback by injury. His sole European Tour win came at the 1992 Jersey European Airways Open. It was the first tour win by a Portuguese golfer.

Silva represented Portugal in the World Cup in 1989 and 1991. He is a renowned golf coach who has trained with Butch Harmon. In 2015, Silva founded Season Golf Academy (SGA) in Finland.

== Professional wins (1) ==
=== European Tour wins (1) ===
No.	Date	Tournament	Winning score	Margin of victory	Runner-up
1	12 Apr 1992	Jersey European Airways Open	−11 (69-65-70-73=277)	2 strokes	(England) Chris Moody

== Results in major championships ==
Tournament	1991
The Open Championship	T80

Note: Silva only played in The Open Championship.
"T" = tied

== Team appearances ==
Amateur

- St Andrews Trophy (representing the Continent of Europe): 1986, 1988

Professional

- World Cup (representing Portugal): 1989, 1991
