= Des Smyth =

Irish professional golfer (born 1953)

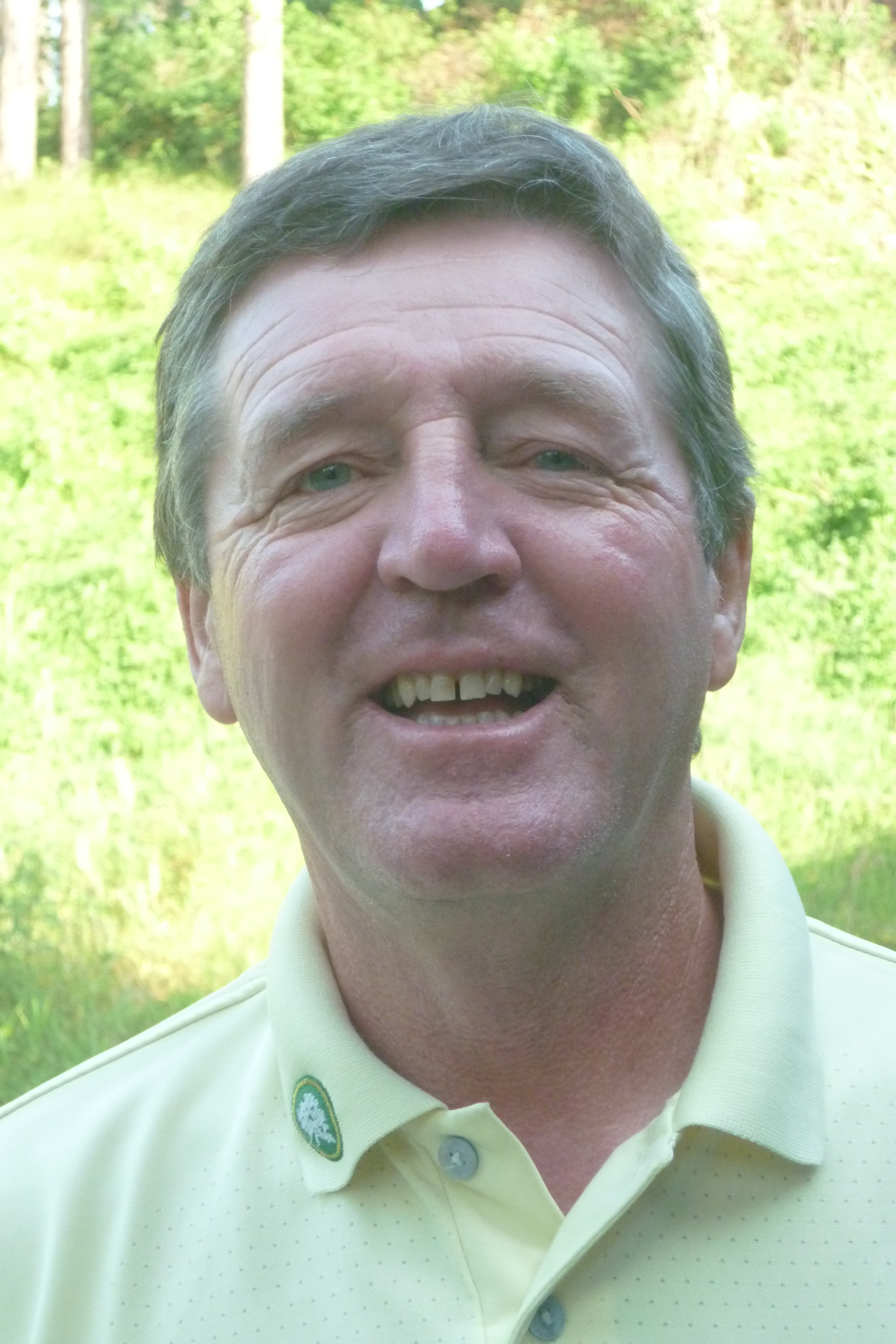
- Smyth in 2010

Personal information
- Full name: Desmond John Smyth
- Nationality: Ireland
- Born: 12 February 1953 (age 73) Drogheda, County Louth, Ireland
- Height: 5 ft 10 in (1.78 m)
- Weight: 168 lb (76 kg; 12.0 st)

Career
- Sport: Golf
- Turned professional: 1974
- Former tours: European Tour; European Senior Tour; PGA Tour Champions
- Professional wins: 26
- Highest ranking: 48 (7 May 1989)

Number of wins by tour
- European Tour: 8
- PGA Tour Champions: 2
- European Senior Tour: 5
- Other: 9 (regular); 2 (senior)

Best results in major championships
- Masters Tournament: DNP
- PGA Championship: DNP
- U.S. Open: DNP
- The Open Championship: T4: 1982

Desmond John Smyth (born 12 February 1953) is an Irish professional golfer. He won eight times on the European Tour between 1979 and 2001. He also had a successful senior career winning twice on the PGA Tour Champions and five times on the European Senior Tour between 2005 and 2012. He played in two Ryder Cup matches, 1979 and 1981.

== Professional career ==
Smyth turned professional in 1974 and was a member of the European Tour for over a quarter of a century. His best finish on the European Tour Order of Merit was seventh in 1988. He won eight tournaments on the tour across four different decades, breaking Neil Coles' record as the oldest man to win a European Tour event when he claimed the 2001 Madeira Island Open at the age of 48 years and 34 days. This record was broken by Miguel Ángel Jiménez (48 years, 11 months, 13 days) at the 2012 UBS Hong Kong Open.

Smyth represented Europe in the Ryder Cup in 1979 and 1981, losing on both occasions to the United States. Smyth also represented his country in the World Cup and the Alfred Dunhill Cup many times and was a member of the Irish team (alongside Eamonn Darcy and Ronan Rafferty) which won the latter in 1988. At the 2006 Ryder Cup, he was one of Ian Woosnam's vice-captains.

After turning fifty in 2003, Smyth had a successful career in senior golf, winning tournaments on both the Champions Tour and the European Senior Tour. He was one of the co-designers, along with Declan Brannigan, of Seapoint Golf Links.

Smyth is the only golfer to win European Tour events in 4 different decades.

== Personal life ==
Smyth has a son, Greg, a horticultural student at IT Blanchardstown. Greg won Ireland's eighth largest lottery jackpot of €9,426,636 on 13 August 2008.

== Amateur wins ==
- 1973 West of Ireland Amateur Open Championship

== Professional wins (26) ==
=== European Tour wins (8) ===
No.	Date	Tournament	Winning score	Margin of victory	Runner(s)-up
1	5 Aug 1979	Sun Alliance Match Play Championship	1 up		(Zimbabwe) Nick Price
2	8 Jun 1980	Newcastle Brown "900" Open	−12 (67-70-70-69=276)	1 stroke	(England) Graham Burroughs, (England) Neil Coles, (Australia) Greg Norman
3	22 Jun 1980	Cold Shield Greater Manchester Open	−7 (67-71-69-66=273)	Playoff	(England) Brian Waites
4	28 Jun 1981	Coral Classic	−6 (67-72-70-73=282)	2 strokes	(England) Michael King, (West Germany) Bernhard Langer, (Republic of Ireland) John O'Leary
5	30 Oct 1983	Sanyo Open	−9 (72-66-70-71=279)	1 stroke	(South Africa) Hugh Baiocchi, (England) Mark James
6	23 Oct 1988	BNP Jersey Open	−15 (69-68-69-67=273)	Playoff	(England) Roger Chapman
7	31 Oct 1993	Madrid Open	−16 (65-68-68-71=272)	3 strokes	(Spain) Domingo Hospital, (Spain) José Rivero, (England) Mark Roe, (South Africa) Wayne Westner
8	18 Mar 2001	Madeira Island Open	−18 (66-70-68-66=270)	2 strokes	(England) John Bickerton

European Tour playoff record (2–3)

No.	Year	Tournament	Opponent(s)	Result
1	1980	Cold Shield Greater Manchester Open	(England) Brian Waites	Won with birdie on sixth extra hole
2	1982	Jersey Open	(Republic of Ireland) Eamonn Darcy, (Scotland) Bernard Gallacher	Gallacher won with par on fifth extra hole Darcy eliminated by birdie on second hole
3	1984	Sanyo Open	(Scotland) Sam Torrance	Lost to par on first extra hole
4	1986	Whyte & Mackay PGA Championship	(Australia) Rodger Davis	Lost to bogey on third extra hole
5	1988	BNP Jersey Open	(England) Roger Chapman	Won with birdie on fifth extra hole

=== Other wins (9) ===
- 1979 Irish National PGA Championship
- 1980 Irish Dunlop Tournament, Carroll's Irish Match Play Championship
- 1985 Irish National PGA Championship
- 1986 Irish National PGA Championship
- 1990 Irish National PGA Championship
- 1995 Glen Dimplex Irish International Match Play Championship
- 1996 Irish National PGA Championship
- 2001 Irish National PGA Championship

=== Champions Tour wins (2) ===
No.	Date	Tournament	Winning score	Margin of victory	Runner(s)-up
1	13 Mar 2005	SBC Classic	−5 (71-72-68=211)	1 stroke	(Republic of Ireland) Mark McNulty, (United States) D. A. Weibring
2	24 Apr 2005	Liberty Mutual Legends of Golf	−8 (66-71-71=208)	2 strokes	(United States) Tom Jenkins

Champions Tour playoff record (0–1)

No.	Year	Tournament	Opponent	Result
1	2005	The Senior British Open Championship	(United States) Tom Watson	Lost to par on third extra hole

=== European Senior Tour wins (5) ===
Legend
Tour Championships (1)
Other European Senior Tour (4)

No.	Date	Tournament	Winning score	Margin of victory	Runner(s)-up
1	12 Nov 2005	Arcapita Seniors Tour Championship	−10 (68-68-70=206)	2 strokes	(Scotland) John Chillas
2	5 Aug 2007	Wentworth Senior Masters	−6 (70-71-69=210)	2 strokes	(New Zealand) Bob Charles
3	5 Sep 2010	Travis Perkins plc Senior Masters	−10 (66-71-69=206)	3 strokes	(England) Carl Mason
4	26 Jun 2011	Van Lanschot Senior Open	−6 (71-74-65=210)	2 strokes	(Australia) Peter Fowler, (United States) Tim Thelen
5	2 Sep 2012	Travis Perkins plc Senior Masters (2)	−10 (72-66-68=206)	1 stroke	(Australia) Peter Fowler

European Senior Tour playoff record (0–2)

No.	Year	Tournament	Opponent	Result
1	2005	The Senior British Open Championship	(United States) Tom Watson	Lost to par on third extra hole
2	2011	Cannes Mougins Masters	(Spain) Juan Quirós	Lost to birdie on second extra hole

=== Other senior wins (2) ===
- 2011 Liberty Mutual Legends of Golf – Raphael Division (with Mark James)
- 2012 Liberty Mutual Legends of Golf – Raphael Division (with Mark James)

== Results in major championships ==
Tournament	1975	1976	1977	1978	1979
The Open Championship	CUT	CUT	CUT		

Tournament	1980	1981	1982	1983	1984	1985	1986	1987	1988	1989
The Open Championship	CUT	T31	T4	CUT	CUT	CUT	CUT	CUT		CUT

Tournament	1990	1991	1992	1993	1994	1995	1996	1997	1998	1999
The Open Championship	CUT	T44	CUT	T27	CUT		DQ		T15	CUT

Tournament	2000	2001	2002
The Open Championship		T13	T28

Note: Smyth only played in The Open Championship.

Top 10
Did not play

CUT = missed the half-way cut (3rd round cut in 1977, 1980 and 1985 Open Championships)
DQ = Disqualified
"T" = tied

== Team appearances ==
Amateur

- European Amateur Team Championship (representing Ireland): 1973

Professional

- Ryder Cup (representing Europe): 1979, 1981
- World Cup (representing Ireland): 1979, 1980, 1982, 1988, 1989
- Hennessy Cognac Cup (representing Great Britain and Ireland): 1980 (winners), 1982 (winners), (representing Ireland) 1984
- Alfred Dunhill Cup (representing Ireland): 1985, 1986, 1987, 1988 (winners), 2000
- UBS Cup (representing the Rest of the World): 2001, 2003 (tie)

== See also ==
- List of golfers with most European Tour wins
- List of golfers with most European Senior Tour wins
