= Ángel de la Torre =

Spanish golfer and instructor (1896–1983)

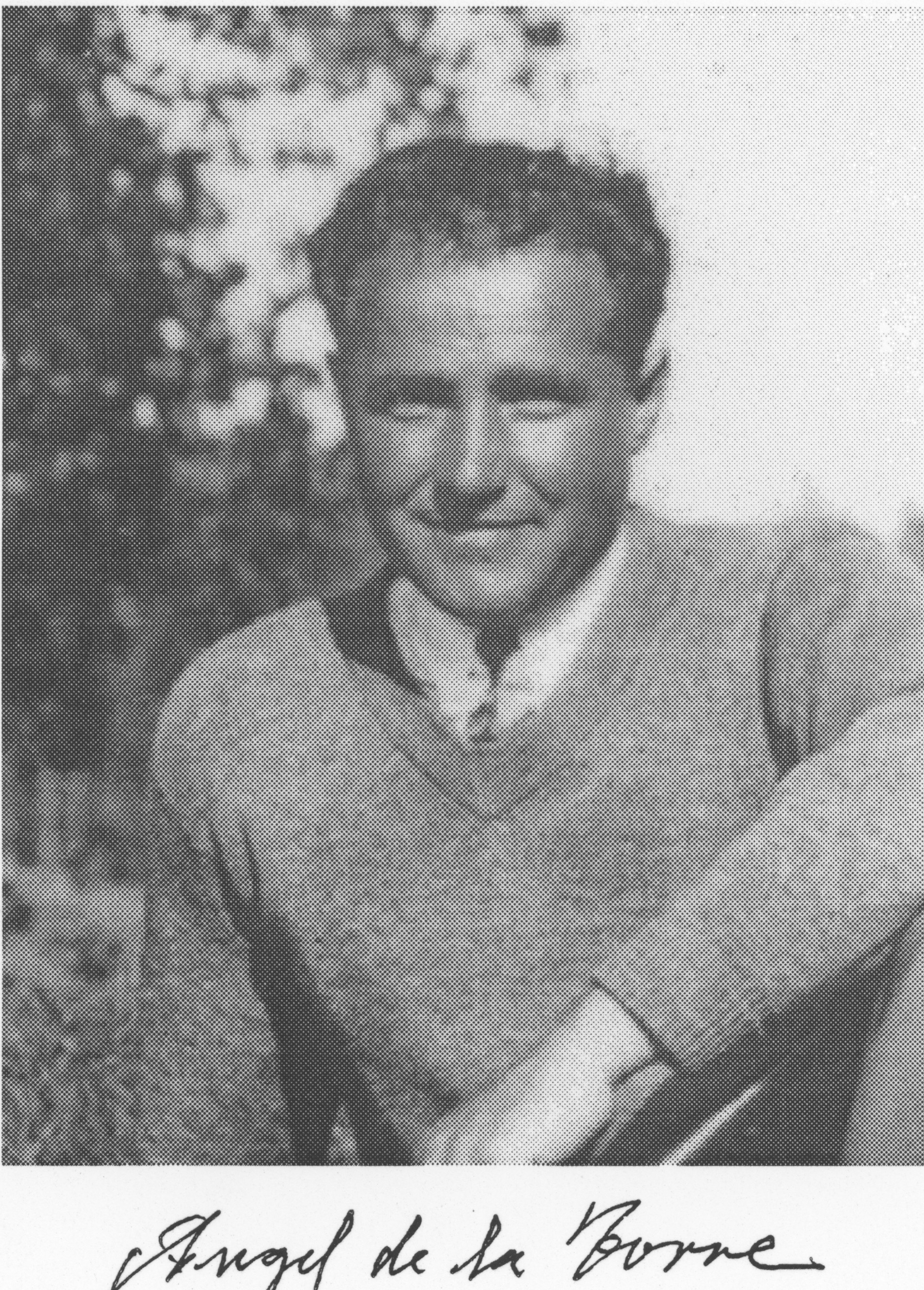
- Born: 30 November 1896; Priego de Cordoba, Spain
- Died: 28 August 1983 (aged 86)
- Occupation: Professional golfer
- Known for: He was the first Spanish golfer to become professional.; He was the first Spanish golfer to complete in the U.S. Open.

Ángel de la Torre (30 November 1896 – 28 August 1983) was a Spanish professional golfer and golf instructor. In 1916, he became the first Spanish golfer to turn professional, and in 1920, he was the first Spaniard to compete in The Open Championship, and finished tied for 16th. He was also the first Spanish golfer to complete the U.S. Open in the United States. Perhaps most significant among his competitive accomplishments were his five victories in the Spanish Open between 1916 and 1925 – a record that still stands.

Playing in international events, he made the acquaintance of Ernest Jones, who had a major impact on the principles used in de la Torre's teaching. Having taught himself French and English, de la Torre was able to teach in three languages.

== Introduction to golf ==
Born in Priego de Cordoba, Spain, his uncle, Pedro de la Torre, was the greenskeeper at Club de las Cuarenta Fanegas, which was the first golf course in Spain. His father, Ricardo de la Torre y Torres, worked on the grounds at Real Club de la Puerta de Hierro. At the age of 8, Angel began his golf journey as a caddie under the professional Lucien, at the Club de las Cuarenta Fanegas. In 1910, at age 13, the caddie tournament was his first victory.

== Career as golf professional ==
In the summer of 1913 the Conde de la Cimera (a principal in developing Puerta de Hierro) sent Angel to St. Jean de Luz in southern France to be assistant to 1907 Open Champion Arnaud Massy at the Le Nivelle Golf Club. Massy also won the Spanish and British Open. While de la Torre was there, Massy was called for military service; and the Golf Committee gave Angel the job of head professional. He was 17 years old.

Upon the outbreak of WWI, he returned to Madrid in 1914 and accepted the position of golf professional at the Real Club de la Puerta de Hierro in Madrid. He subsequently set the course record of 65. It was above the pro shop that his wife Juana gave birth to their two sons Luis and Manuel. In 1920 the Conde de la Cimera sponsored Angel so he could play tournaments in France, Belgium and England. This sponsorship continued until 1925.

In 1925, he agreed to travel to the United States to play in the U.S. Open. In 1927, upon the recommendations of Captain Allison (a premier architect who he had met in England), he was offered and accepted the position of golf professional at the outstanding new course called Timber Point Country Club in Great River Long Island, New York. His family joined him there. From November through March, he would teach at Passatiempo where he set the course record in 1931. He would continue in these capacities until 1932. When the U.S. Depression set in, he was offered the golf professional position at the new Club de Campo in Madrid Spain where the family remained until 1936, just prior to the war.

In May 1936 he traveled to London to take delivery on a set of golf clubs that he had designed. From London, he telephoned his wife and advised that he would travel to the United States to visit his long-time friend Ernest Jones. Subsequently, Jones offered him the position of teaching professional at the Women's National Golf and Tennis club on Long Island, New York. Shortly thereafter the Spanish Civil War broke out.

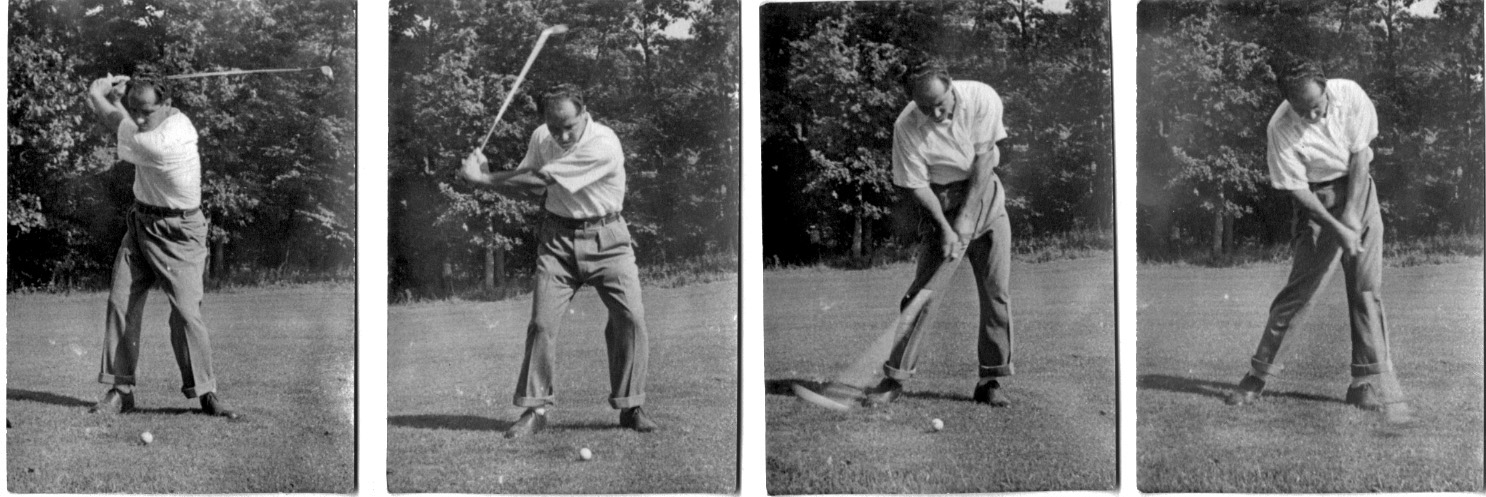
Angel de la Torre's golf swing

Now being employed in the United States, immigration laws of the time enabled Angel to send for the rest of his family. Leaving everything behind but what they could carry, Angel's wife Juana and sons Manuel and Luis, left via Barcelona, Spain, en route to Paris France. They were reunited with Angel in New York City in October 1936. In December 1936, he was in California where he became a golf instructor at Brookside Municipal Golf Course in Pasadena. Through an introduction from Bill Hickey (golf professional at Brookside), he met Eddie Loos who then offered de la Torre a position as assistant professional at Lake Shore Country Club in Glencoe, Illinois. De la Torre subsequently became the head professional at that club and served in that capacity for 37 years. Thereafter, he would continue teaching. He would teach at Tamarisk Country Club in Palm Springs in the winter months and at Glenview Naval Air Station in Glenview, Illinois, in the summer. Over the duration of his career, Angel had 13 holes-in-one.

== De la Torre's sons ==
De la Torre's son, Manuel de la Torre, followed in his father's footsteps becoming a golf professional. Manuel established an extensive playing record and has become world-famous as a golf instructor. Angel's other son Luis became a professor at the University of Chicago and pursued a career in photography.

== Tournament wins (6) ==
Note: This list may be incomplete.

- 1916 Spanish Open
- 1917 Spanish Open
- 1919 Spanish Open
- 1923 Spanish Open
- 1925 Spanish Open
- 1935 Spanish PGA
