= Tournament Players Championship (United Kingdom) =

Tournament information
- Location: Cornwall, England
- Established: 1977
- Course: St. Mellion International Resort
- Par: 70
- Tour: European Tour
- Format: Stroke play
- Prize fund: £100,000
- Month played: June
- Final year: 1984

Tournament record score
- Aggregate: 265 Jaime Gonzalez (1984)
- To par: −18 Nick Faldo (1982)

Final champion
- (Brazil) Jaime Gonzalez
- Location in England Location in Cornwall

The Tournament Players Championship was a professional golf tournament on the European Tour from 1977 to 1984. It was founded as a direct replacement to the Piccadilly Medal tournament. Except in the first two years the official name took the form "[Sponsor's name] TPC". It was played in either England or Scotland. Having started as one of the richest events on the tour, it had below average prize money in later years.

Winners of the Tournament Players Championship included two major champions, Nick Faldo of England and Bernhard Langer of Germany.

Since the demise of the Tournament Players Championship, the TPC moniker has also been applied to the Lawrence Batley International T.P.C. in 1986, the Portuguese Open TPC in 1989 and 1990, and the Deutsche Bank Open TPC of Europe in Germany from 1995 to 2007. "Tournament Players Championship" was also the original name of the PGA Tour's Players Championship, which is the richest event on that tour

== Winners ==
Year	Winner	Score	To par	Margin of victory	Runner(s)-up	Winner's share (£)	Venue
St. Mellion Timeshare TPC
1984	(Brazil) Jaime Gonzalez	265	−15	Playoff	(England) Mark James	16,660	St. Mellion
1983	(West Germany) Bernhard Langer	269	−11	2 strokes	(England) Paul Way	13,330	St. Mellion
Haig Whisky TPC
1982	(England) Nick Faldo	270	−18	3 strokes	(Spain) Manuel Calero	11,660	Notts
1981	(Scotland) Brian Barnes	276	−8	Playoff	(England) Brian Waites	10,000	Dalmahoy
1980	(Scotland) Bernard Gallacher	268	−8	3 strokes	(England) Nick Faldo (West Germany) Bernhard Langer	9,000	Moortown
SOS Talisman TPC
1979	(England) Michael King	281	−7	1 stroke	(England) Brian Waites	8,330	Moor Park
Tournament Players Championship
1978	(England) Brian Waites	286	−6	1 stroke	(England) Neil Coles	8,000	Foxhills
1977	(England) Neil Coles	288	−4	1 stroke	(England) Peter Dawson	8,000	Foxhills
