= List of Welsh records in athletics =

The Welsh records in athletics are ratified by Welsh Athletics, Wales' governing body for the sport of athletics. A Welsh National Record can be set by any athlete with Welsh Qualification in worldwide competition.

== Key to tables ==
Key: Pending ratification Record not kept by Welsh Athletics Not ratified or later rescinded by Welsh Athletics

== Outdoor ==
=== Men ===
Event	Record	Athlete	Date	Meet	Place	Ref.
100 m	9.97 (+1.4 m/s)	Jeremiah Azu	25 May 2024	True Athletes Classics	Leverkusen, Germany	
150 m (straight)	15.28 (+1.5 m/s)	Christian Malcolm	15 May 2011	Great Manchester City Games	Manchester, England	
200 m	20.08 (+1.0 m/s)	Christian Malcolm	8 August 2001	World Championships	Edmonton, Canada	
300 m	32.06	Jamie Baulch	31 May 1997	BMC Cardiff	Cardiff, Wales	
400 m	44.36	Iwan Thomas	13 July 1997	British Championship	Birmingham, England	
500 m	63.55	Sean Price	12 August 1990	Electric Games	Haringey, England	
600 m	1:17.2	Joe Thomas	5 May 2008	Brewer Games Open Graded	Cheltenham, England	
800 m	1:44.98	Gareth Warburton	7 June 2012	Bislett Games	Oslo, Norway	
800 m	1:44.35	Justin Davies	10 May 2025	Belfast Irish Milers Meet	Belfast, United Kingdom	
1000 m	2:17.36	Neil Horsfield	9 August 1991	Pearl Assurance	Gateshead, England	
1500 m	3:31.08	Jake Heyward	5 August 2022	Commonwealth Games	Birmingham, United Kingdom	
Mile	3:51.99	Jake Heyward	28 May 2022	Prefontaine Classic	Eugene, United States	
Mile	3:46.73	Jake Heyward	18 July 2026	London Athletics Meet	London, United Kingdom	
2000 m
2000 m	4:57.61	Piers Copeland	19 August 2020	Irena Szewińska Memorial	Bydgoszcz, Poland	
3000 m	7:46.40	Ian Hamer	20 January 1990	CGWU	Auckland, New Zealand	
Two miles	8:20.28	David James	27 June 1980	Talbot International Games	Crystal Palace, England	
5000 m	13:09.80	Ian Hamer	9 June 1992	Golden Gala	Rome, Italy	
5 km (road)	13:34	Osian Perrin	12 August 2023		Cardiff, Wales	
10,000 m	27:39.14	Steve Jones	9 July 1983	Bislett Games	Oslo, Norway	
10 km (road)	27:59	Steve Jones	23 April 1984	AAA's 10 km	Birmingham, England	
Half marathon	1:00:59	Steve Jones	8 June 1986	GNR/AAA	Newcastle, England	
One hour						
Marathon	2:07:13	Steve Jones	20 October 1985	Chicago Marathon	Chicago, United States	
110 m hurdles	12.91 (+0.5 m/s)	Colin Jackson	20 August 1993	World Championships	Stuttgart, Germany	
300 m hurdles	37.1 h	Phil Harries	29 April 1993		Burton-on-Trent, England	
400 m hurdles	47.84	Dai Greene	6 July 2012	Diamond League	Paris, France	
2000 m steeplechase	5:53.6 h	Roger Hackney	10 June 1982		Birmingham, England	
3000 m steeplechase	8:18.91	Roger Hackney	30 July 1988		Hechtel, Belgium	
High jump	2.25 m	Rob Mitchell	28 July 2001	AAA Combined Events Championships	Bedford, England	
Pole vault	5.60 m	Neil Winter	19 August 2995	British Athletics League Division 1	Enfield, England	
Long jump	8.23 m (+2.0 m/s)	Lynn Davies	30 June 1968		Bern, Switzerland	
Triple jump	16.71 m (+1.7 m/s)	Steven Shalders	3 September 2005	UK Challenge Final	Manchester, England	
Shot put	20.45 m	Shaun Pickering	17 August 1997	The SPAR British Challenge UK Athletics	Crystal Palace, England	
Discus throw	66.84 m	Brett Morse	30 June 2013	Welsh Championships	Cardiff, Wales	
Hammer throw	73.89 m	Osian Jones	25 August 2019	British Championships	Birmingham, England	
Javelin throw	81.70 m (Current design)	Nigel Bevan	28 June 1992	AAA Championships	Birmingham, England	
Decathlon	7882 pts	Ben Gregory	13–14 April 2016	Mt SAC Relays	Azusa, United States	
Decathlon	100m (wind) / Long jump (wind) / Shot put / High jump / 400m / 110m H (wind) / Discus / Pole vault / Javelin / 1500m; 11.14 (+1.8 m/s) / 7.34 m (+2.7 m/s) / 13.51 m / 1.90 m / 50.23 / 14.60 (+0.9 m/s) / 40.77 m / 5.00 m / 54.78 m / 4:23.09					
4 × 100 m relay	38.73	Kevin Williams; Doug Turner; Christian Malcolm; Jamie Henthorn	21 September 1998	Commonwealth Games	Kuala Lumpur, Malaysia	
4 × 400 m relay	3:00.41	Tim Benjamin; Iwan Thomas; Jamie Baulch; Matthew Elias	31 July 2002	Commonwealth Games	Manchester, England	

=== Women ===
Event	Record	Athlete	Date	Meet	Place	Ref.
100 m	11.33 (+1.7 m/s)	Hannah Brier	24 June 2022	British Championships	Manchester, United Kingdom	
100 m	11.26 (+1.6 m/s)	Hannah Brier	17 August 2025	Newham & Essex Beagles Stratford Speed Grand Prix	London, England	
150 m (straight)	17.61 (−0.3 m/s)	Catherine Murphy	11 August 1996	Performance Games	Crystal Palace, England	
200 m	22.80 (+0.5 m/s)	Michelle Scutt	12 June 1982	UK Championships	Cwmbran, Wales	
200 m	22.79 (+1.9 m/s)	Hannah Brier	25 May 2026	Newham & Essex Beagles Stratford Speed Grand Prix	London, England	
400 m	50.63	Michelle Scutt	31 May 1982		Cwmbran, Wales	
400 m	50.45	Charlotte Henrich	18 July 2026	London Athletics Meet	London, United Kingdom	
800 m	1:57.42	Kirsty Wade	24 June 1985	UlsG	Belfast, Ireland	
1000 m	2:33.70	Kirsty Wade	9 August 1985	Kodak 1 Mile	Gateshead, England	
1500 m	3:58.01	Melissa Courtney-Bryant	16 July 2023	Kamila Skolimowska Memorial	Chorzów, Poland	
Mile	4:16.38	Melissa Courtney-Bryant	21 July 2023	Herculis	Fontvieille	
2000 m	5:26.08	Melissa Courtney-Bryant	12 July 2024	Herculis	Fontvieille, Monaco	
3000 m	8:39.20 (Note: outdoor best; indoor mark ratified as absolute record)	Melissa Courtney-Bryant	18 August 2018	Müller Grand Prix	Birmingham, England	
Two miles	9:49.73	Hayley Tullett	23 May 1999	Loughborough International Match	Loughborough, England	
5000 m	14:53.82	Melissa Courtney-Bryant	30 May 2019	BAUHAUS-galan	Stockholm, Sweden	
5000 m	14:48.20	Melissa Courtney-Bryant	24 May 2025	Track Fest	Los Angeles, United States	
5 km (road)	15:18	Cari Hughes	16 March 2025		Lille, France	
10,000 m	31:55.30	Angela Tooby	4 September 1987	World Championships	Rome, Italy	
10 km (road)	31:26 (Note: by official result source;31:28 by WA source)	Charlotte Arter	6 March 2022	Trafford 10K	Trafford, (Note: by official result source; Leeds by WA source, probably a typo) England	
15 km (road)	51:52+	Clara Evans	3 December 2023	Valencia Marathon	Valencia, Spain	
Half marathon	1:09:41	Charlotte Arter	10 February 2019	Barcelona Half Marathon	Barcelona, Spain	
25 km (road)	1:26:26+	Clara Evans	3 December 2023	Valencia Marathon	Valencia, Spain	
30 km (road)	1:43:46+	Clara Evans	3 December 2023	Valencia Marathon	Valencia, Spain	
Marathon	2:25:04	Clara Evans	3 December 2023	Valencia Marathon	Valencia, Spain	
100 m hurdles	12.91 (+1.8 m/s)	Kay Morley	2 February 1990	Commonwealth Games	Auckland, New Zealand	
300 m hurdles						
400 m hurdles	56.43	Alyson Layzell	16 June 1996	AAA Championships	Birmingham, England	
2000 m steeplechase	6:38.76	Jade Williams	13 May 2017	BMC Grand Prix	Solihull, England	
2000 m steeplechase	6:36.56 (Note: by Welsh Athletics source; 6:36.57 by World Athletics source)	Kate Seary	22 July 2025 (Note: by Welsh Athletics source; 21 June 2025 by World Athletics source)	The Elliott Denman NJ International	West Long Branch, United States	
3000 m steeplechase	9:55.96	Kate Seary	25 March 2022	Raleigh Relays	Raleigh, United States	
3000 m steeplechase	9:41.66	Cari Hughes	2 August 2025	UK Championships	Birmingham, United Kingdom	
High jump	1.89 m (Note: outdoor best; indoor mark ratified as absolute record)	Julie Crane	15 August 2004	Scottish Championships	Glasgow, Scotland	
Pole vault	4.40 m (Note: outdoor best; indoor mark ratified as absolute record)	Sally Peake	12 July 2014	Glasgow Grand Prix	Glasgow, Scotland	
Pole vault	4.40 m	Sally Peake	21 April 2016	Chula Vista Throws/Vault	Chula Vista, United States	
Long jump	6.54 m (+0.7 m/s)	Rebecca Chapman	2 July 2017	British Championships	Birmingham, England	
Triple jump	13.44 m (−0.9 m/s)	Hannah Frankson	26 June 2011	Aviva U20/U23 Championships	Bedford, England	
Shot put	18.93 m (Note: outdoor best; indoor mark ratified as absolute record)	Venissa Head	13 May 1984		Haverfordwest, Wales	
Discus throw	64.68 m	Venissa Head	18 July 1983	WAL vs. GRE	Athens, Greece	
Hammer throw	70.21 m	Amber Simpson	13 April 2024	Gary Wieneke Memorial	Memphis, United States	
Javelin throw	53.74 m	Freya Jones	19 May 2024		Loughborough, England	
Javelin throw	56.53 m (Note: by World Athletics source; 56.84 m by Welsh Athletics source, probably a typo)	Freya Jones	3 August 2025	UK Championships	Birmingham, United Kingdom	
Heptathlon	6011 pts	Abigail Pawlett	19 May 2024	Hypo-Meeting	Götzis, Austria	
Heptathlon	100m H (wind) / High jump / Shot put / 200m (wind) / Long jump (wind) / Javelin / 800m; 13.10 (+1.3 m/s) / 1.71 m / 14.39 m / 23.55 (+0.6 m/s) / 6.02 m (+0.5 m/s) / 32.09 m / 2:20.32					
Heptathlon	6320 pts	Abigail Pawlett	20 July 2025	European U23 Championships	Bergen, Norway	
Heptathlon	100m H (wind) / High jump / Shot put / 200m (wind) / Long jump (wind) / Javelin / 800m; 13.06 (+1.1 m/s) / 1.71 m / 14.53 m / 23.23 (−1.3 m/s) / 6.21 m (+0.1 m/s) / 40.67 m / 2:17.51					
35 km walk (road)	2:58:48	Bethan Davies	23 April 2022	Dudinská Päťdesiatka	Dudince, Slovakia	
4 × 100 m relay	44.51	Hannah Brier; Hannah Thomas; Mica Moore; Rachel Johncock	2 August 2014	Commonwealth Games	Glasgow, Scotland	
4 × 400 m relay	3:35.60	Carmen Smart; Kirsty McDermott; Diane Fryar; Michelle Scutt	4 July 1982		Dublin, Ireland	

== Indoor ==
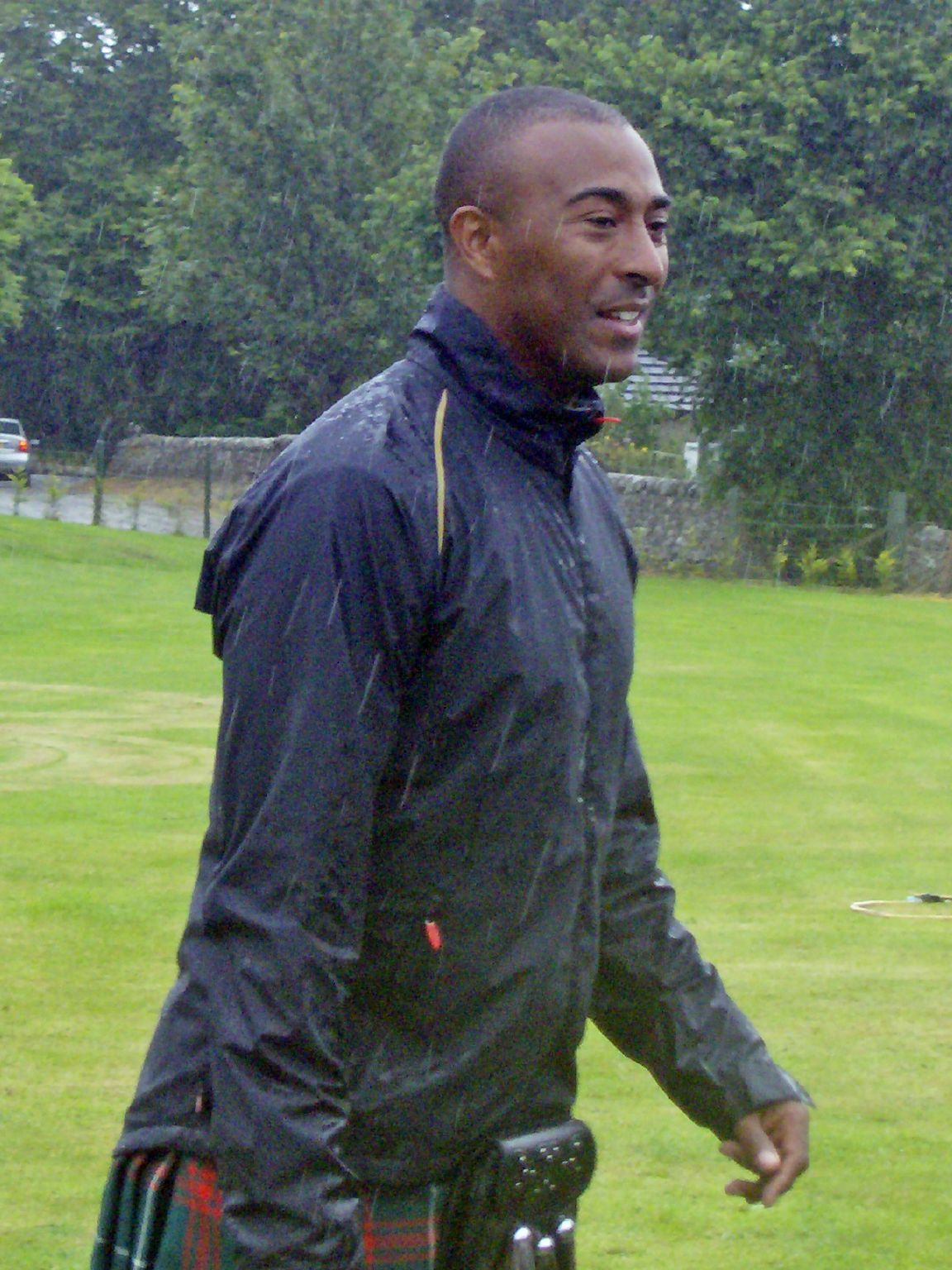
Colin Jackson's European and world record in the 60 metre hurdles remains unbeaten.

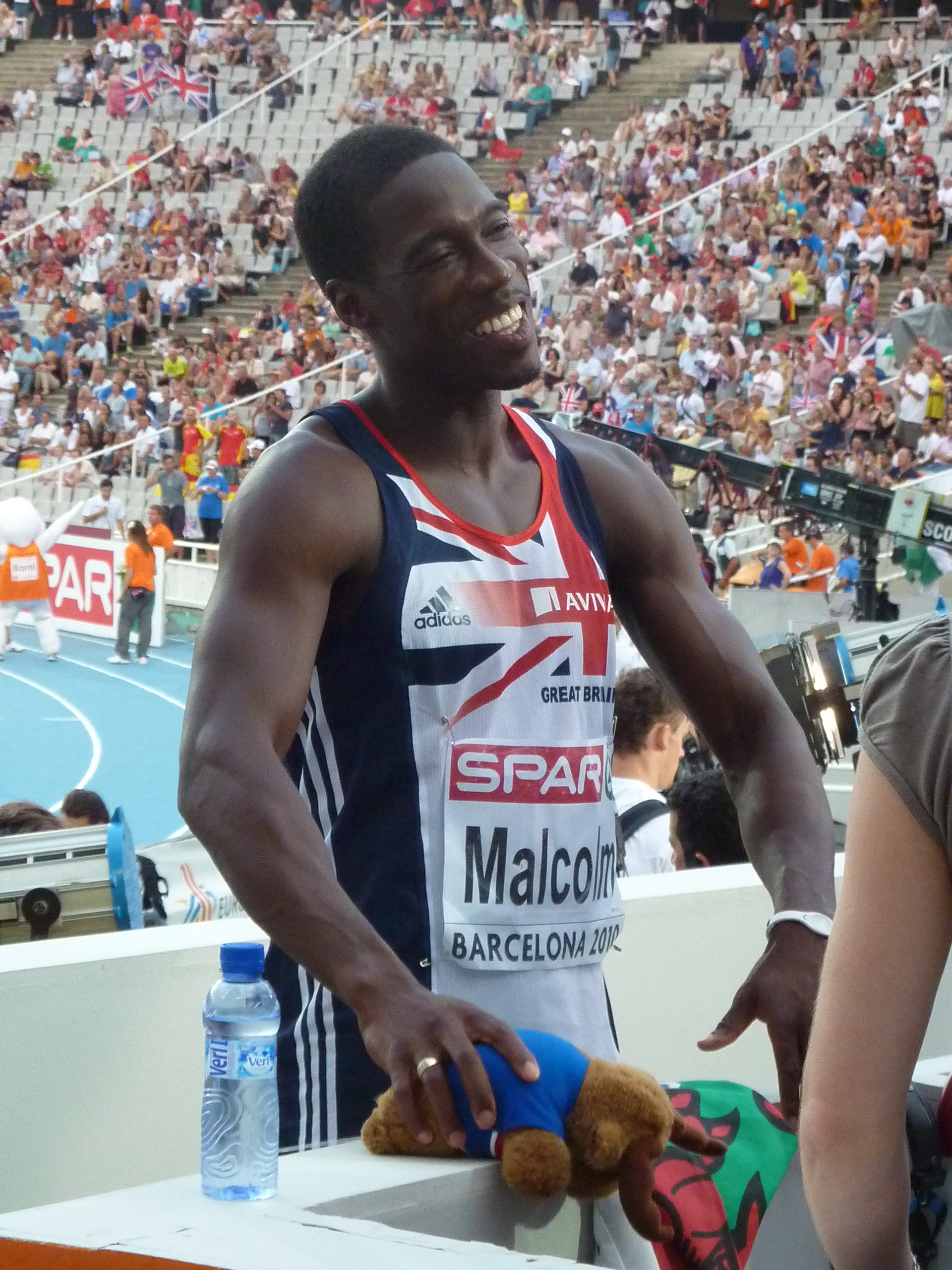
Christian Malcolm's multiple Welsh records. Welsh sprinting legend representing Wales and Great Britain in the World Championship and Olympic Games.

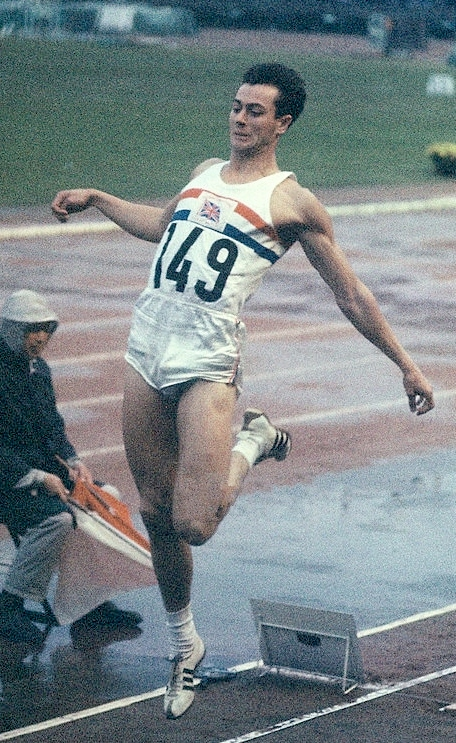
Lynn Davies, indoor and outdoor Welsh record holder in the long jump with leaps of 8.23 outdoors and 7.97 indoors respectively. Lynn remains as the only athlete to win Olympic gold in track and field since his win in the 1964 Olympic Games in Tokyo. He remains the only Welsh jumper to leap over 8 metres, and his Welsh records has remained unbeaten for 54 years.

=== Men ===
Event	Record	Athlete	Date	Meet	Place	Ref.
50 m	5.81	Christian Malcolm	24 February 2002	Meeting Hauts-de-France Pas-de-Calais	Lievin, France	
50 m	5.59+	Jeremiah Azu	9 March 2025	European Championships	Apeldoorn, Netherlands	
60 m	6.49	Colin Jackson	11 March 1994	European Championships	Paris, France	
60 m	6.49	Jeremiah Azu	9 March 2025	European Championships	Apeldoorn, Netherlands	
60 m	6.49	Jeremiah Azu	23 March 2025	World Championships	Nanjing, China	
60 m	6.45	Jeremiah Azu	20 March 2026	World Championships	Toruń, Poland	
200 m	20.54	Christian Malcolm	26 February 2000	European Championships	Ghent, Belgium	
300 m	32.7+ h	Jamie Baulch	23 February 1997	BUPA Birmingham Indoor Grand Prix	Birmingham, England	
400 m	45.39	Jamie Baulch	8 February 1997	World Championship Trials	Birmingham, England	
600 m	1:16.22	Dai Greene	26 January 2013	British Athletics International Match	Glasgow, Scotland	
800 m	1:45.78	Justin Davies	15 February 2025	Keely Klassic	Birmingham, England	
1000 m	2:21.25	Tom Marshall	4 February 2018	Non-Thomas Open	Cardiff, Wales	
1000 m	2:19.73	Piers Copeland	15 February 2025	Keely Klassic	Birmingham, England	
1500 m	3:36.12	Piers Copeland	19 February 2022	Birmingham Indoor Grand Prix	Birmingham, England	
Mile	3:54.42	Piers Copeland	1 February 2025	BU John Thomas Terrier Classic	Boston, United States	
Mile	3:53.25 OT	Jake Heyward	28 January 2022	UW Invitational	Seattle, United States	
2000 m	5:09.60	James Thie	14 March 2004	LC/UWICvW,E,IRE	Cardiff, Wales	
3000 m	7:48.83	Jake Heyward	11 February 2022	Lilac Grand Prix	Spokane, United States	
5000 m	13:44.70	Adam Bitchell	13 December 2013	Hoosier Open	Bloomington, United States	
50 m hurdles	6.40	Colin Jackson	5 February 1999	HIGP	Budapest, Hungary	
60 m hurdles	7.30	Colin Jackson	6 March 1994		Sindelfingen, Germany	
High jump	2.24 m	Rob Mitchell	24 January 2009	Welsh Championships	Cardiff, Wales	
Pole vault	5.45 m	Paul Walker	2 March 2014	Cardiff Invitation Pole Vault	Cardiff, Wales	
Long jump	7.97 m	Lynn Davies	12 February 1966		Los Angeles, United States	
Triple jump	16.39 m	Steven Shalders	19 February 2006		Sheffield, England	
Shot put	19.47 m	Paul Edwards	6 February 1994	England vs Austria vs Czech	Vienna, Austria	
Heptathlon	5834 pts	Ben Gregory	4-5 March 2017	Scottish National Combined Events	Glasgow, Scotland	
Heptathlon	60m / Long jump / Shot put / High jump / 60m H / Pole vault / 1000m; 7.29 / 7.30m / 13.22m / 1.99m / 8.22 / 4.97m / 2:40.92					
4 × 200 m relay	1:30.5		3 February 2007	Celtic Indoor Cup	Cardiff, Wales	
4 × 400 m relay	3:16.71	Rhys Smith; Adebowale Ademuyewo; Gareth Warburton; David Guest	21 February 2010	Celtic International	Cardiff, Wales	
4 × 800 m relay						

=== Women ===
Event	Record	Athlete	Date	Meet	Place	Ref.
50 m	6.4 h	Elizabeth Gill	20 February 1966		Berlin, Germany	
60 m	7.24	Rachel Johncock	21 February 2015	Sainsbury's Grand Prix	Birmingham, England	
200 m	23.35	Catherine Murphy	28 January 2001	AAA Championships	Birmingham, England	
200 m	23.25	Hannah Brier	15 February 2026	British Championships	Birmingham, England	
300 m	37.1+ h	Catherine Murphy	17 February 2002		Birmingham, England	
400 m	51.60	Seren Bundy-Davies	30 January 2016	Vienna Indoor	Vienna, Austria	
800 m	2.01.52	Hayley Tullett	15 February 1998	BUPA Birmingham Indoor Grand Prix	Birmingham, England	
800 m	1:57.43	Isabelle Boffey	30 January 2026	BU John Thomas Terrier Classic	Boston, United States	
1000 m	2:38.95	Kirsty Wade	1 February 1987	Sparkassen Cup World Meeting	Stuttgart, Germany	
1500 m	4:04.79	Melissa Courtney-Bryant	9 February 2021	Meeting Hauts-de-France Pas-de-Calais	Liévin, France	
Mile	4:23.86	Kirsty Wade	5 February 1988	Millrose Games	New York City, United States	
2000 m	5:45.81	Kirsty Wade	13 March 1987	ENG vs. USA	Cosford, England	
3000 m	8:28.69	Melissa Courtney-Bryant	2 February 2025	New Balance Indoor Grand Prix	Boston, United States	
5000 m	15:10.19	Jennifer Nesbitt	9 October 2024	BU David Hemery Valentine Invitational	Boston, United States	
50 m hurdles						
60 m hurdles	8.09	Abigail Pawlett	22 February 2025	British Championships	Birmingham, England	
High jump	1.90 m	Julie Crane	19 February 2005	Loughborough Open	Loughborough, England	
High jump	1.90 m	Julie Crane	28 February 2004		Otterberg, Germany	
Pole vault	4.42 m	Sally Peake	18 February 2012	Finale du Perche Elite Tour	Nevers, France	
Long jump	6.51 m	Ruth Howell	23 February 1974	WAL vs. NED vs. ESP	Cosford, England	
Triple jump	12.53 m	Sara Barry	24 January 2009	Welsh Open Championships	Cardiff, Wales	
Triple jump	12.53 m	Olivia Schrimshaw	11 February 2024	England U20, U17 & U15 Championships	Sheffield, England	
Triple jump	13.05 m	Reese Robinson	15 February 2026	British Championships	Birmingham, England	
Triple jump	13.02 m	Hannah Frankson	12 February 2011	Aviva European Trials & UK Championships	Sheffield, England	
Shot put	19.03 m	Venissa Head	7 April 1984	Welsh Championships	St. Athan, Wales	
Pentathlon	4082 pts	Katia Lannon	28 January 2007	Senior Combined Events International	Zaragoza, Spain	
Pentathlon	60m H / High jump / Shot put / Long jump / 800m; 8.91 / 1.75m / 11.20m / 5.80m / 2:18.76					
Pentathlon	4675 pts	Abigail Pawlett	22 February 2026	Copernicus Cup	Toruń, Poland	
Pentathlon	60m H / High jump / Shot put / Long jump / 800m; 8.18 / 1.80 m / 14.16 m / 6.32 m / 2:17.69					
4 × 200 m relay	1:39.29	Melissa Roberts; Mica Moore; Catherine Hardy; Amy Odunaiya	16 February 2019	BUCS Indoor Championships	Sheffield, England	
4 × 200 m relay	1:38.95		23 February 2014	BUCS Indoor Championships	Sheffield, England	
4 × 400 m relay	3:52.51	Bryony Turnbull; Lucy Lougher; Rhianne Jones; Rebecca Williams	22 February 2009	Celtic International	Cardiff, Wales	
4 × 800 m relay						

=== Mixed ===
Event	Record	Athlete	Date	Meet	Place	Ref.
4 × 400 m relay	3:27.58	Wales; Mark Cottam; Rhiannon Linnington-Payne; Reece Middleton; Ffion Roberts	5 February 2022	Dynamic New Athletics Indoor Match	Glasgow, United Kingdom	

== Age group records ==
=== U20 ===
Event	Record	Athlete	Club	Date	Meet	Place	Age	Ref.
100 m	10.12 (+1.6 m/s)	Christian Malcolm	Cardiff AAC	29 July 1998	World Junior Championships	Annecy, France	19 years, 56 days	
200 m	20.29 (−0.2 m/s)	Christian Malcolm	Cardiff AAC	19 September 1998	Commonwealth Games	Kuala Lumpur, Malaysia	19 years, 108 days	
400 m	46.10	Tim Benjamin	Cardiff AAC	2001				
800 m	1:47.92	Matthew Harding	Colwyn Bay AC	2017				
1500 m	3:36.90	Jake Heyward	Cardiff AAC	2018				
3000 m	7:55.17	Jake Heyward	Cardiff AAC	2018				
5000 m	13:49.26	Osian Perrin	Menai	2022				
110 m hurdles	13.17	David Omoregie	Cardiff AAC	2014				
400 m hurdles	51.14	David Greene	Swansea Harriers	2005				
2000 m steeplechase	5:34.8 h	Micky Morris	Cwmbran Harries	24 August 1975		Athens, Greece		
High jump	2.24	John Hill	Solihull	1985				
Pole vault	5.50	Neil Winter	Shaftesbury Barnet Harriers	1992				
Long jump	7.56	Colin Jackson	Cardiff AAC	1985				
Triple jump	15.99	Steven Shalders	Cardiff AAC	2000				
Shot put	17.22	Nicholas Young	Deeside AAC	2018				
Discus throw	61.64	James Tomlinson	Pembrokeshire Harriers	2019				
Hammer throw	70.88	Jac Palmer	Cardiff AAC	2015				
Javelin throw	70.80	Tom Hewson	Andover AC	13 July 2019				
Decathlon	7691 pts	David Guest	Bridgend AC	21 July 2010		Moncton, Canada		
Decathlon	100m (wind) / Long jump (wind) / Shot put / High jump / 400m / 110m H (wind) / Discus / Pole vault / Javelin / 1500m							
4 × 100 m relay								
4 × 400 m relay								

=== U17 ===
Event	Record	Athlete	Club	Date	Place
100 m	10.68 (−0.3 m/s)	Max Evans	Maldwyn Harries	27 July 2024	Birmingham
100 m	10.65 (+0.6 m/s)	Jeremiah Azu	Cardiff AAC	26 August 2017	Bedford
200 m	21.19 (+1.6 m/s)	Tim Benjamin	Cardiff AAC	31 July 1998	Belgrave
400 m	47.85	Bruce Tasker	Swansea Harries	15 August 2004	Birmingham
800 m	1:51.6 h	Neil Horsfield	Newport Harriers	31 August 1983	Cwmbran
800 m	1:51.05	Mal Edwards	Wolverhampton & Bilston	20 September 1974	Crystal Palace
1500 m	3:50.19	Ben Reynolds	Cardiff AAC	20 August 2019	Stretford
1500 m	3:46.24	Angus Maclean	Team Southampton	29 August 1997	Catania, Italy
3000 m	8:23.64	Osian Perrin	Menai	20 July 2019	Swansea
5 km (road)	14:30	Osian Perrin	Menai	8 August 2020	Barrowford, England
110 m hurdles	12.94	David Guest	Bridgend AC	21 July 2007	Newport
400 m hurdles	53.30	Mark Rowlands	Swansea Harriers	31 July 1994	Birmingham
1500 m steeplechase	4:25.04	Tristan Cumberland	Brecon AC	3 September 2022	Loughborough
High jump	2.15m	Chuka Enih-Snell	Swansea Harriers	10 September 2000	Abingdon
Pole vault	5.20m	Neil Winter	Shaftesbury Barnet Harriers	2 September 1990	Birmingham
Long jump	7.15m (−0.7 m/s)	Luca Phillips	Cardiff Archers	15 July 2023	Grangemouth
Triple jump	15.14m (+1.5 m/s)	Steven Shalders	Cardiff AAC	18 July 1998	Ayr
Shot put	17.76	Dafydd Pawlett	Pembrokeshire Harriers	18 August 2021	Sportscity
Discus throw	59.13	James Tomlinson	Pembrokeshire Harriers	31 July 2016	Swansea
Hammer throw	73.27	Thomas Williams	Wrexham AC	24 March 2024	Tullamore, Ireland
Javelin throw	74.06	Tom Hewson	Andover AC	5 August 2017	Dublin, Ireland
Decathlon					
Decathlon	100m (wind) / Long jump (wind) / Shot put / High jump / 400m / 110m H (wind) / Discus / Pole vault / Javelin / 1500m				
4 × 100 m relay					
4 × 400 m relay					

=== U15 ===
Event	Record	Athlete	Date	Club	Place	Ref.
100 m	10.99	Andrew Watkins	20 July 2002		Glasgow, Scotland	
200 m	22.13	Andrew Watkins	6 July 2002		Brecon, Wales	
400 m	50.3 h	Malcolm James	29 August 1977		Cwmbran, Wales	
800 m	1:58.65	Nikita Neary	31 July 2012		Exeter, England	
1500 m	4:07.49	Matthew Willis	12 July 2014		Birmingham, England	
3000 m	8:57.25	Matthew Willis	15 July 2014		Cardiff, Wales	
80 m hurdles	11.02	Harry Hillman	1 September 2013		Bedford, England	
High jump	1.97 m	Miles Keller-Jenkins	17 June 2012		Cardiff, Wales	
Pole vault	4.40 m	Neil Winter	2 September 1990	Shaftesbury Barnet Harriers	Birmingham, England	
Long jump	6.63 m	Ian Strange	19 July 1977	Newbridge High School	Cwmbran, Wales	
Triple jump	13.55 m	Darren Yeo	15 July 1989	Swansea Harriers	Dublin, Ireland	
Shot put	17.36 m	Mathew Evans	16 August 2003	Carmarthen Harriers	Sheffield, England	
Discus throw	50.50 m	James Tomlinson	27 September 2014	Pembrokeshire Harriers	Wrexham, Wales	
Hammer throw	61.15 m	Thomas Williams	7 August 2022	Wrexham AC	Templemore, Ireland	
Javelin throw	56.98 m	Lewie Jones	Swansea Harriers	4 September 2021	Newport, Wales	
Pentathlon	3297 pts	David Guest	23 September 2006	Bridgend AC	Exeter, England	

=== U13 (Boys) ===
Event	Record	Athlete	Club	Date	Place
100 m	12.04 (+1.1 m/s)	Regan McCarthy	Cardiff AAC	13 August 2022	Newport
200 m	24.71 (+0.1 m/s)	Jacob Barnes	Cardiff AAC	11 August 2024	Swansea
600 m	1:34.4 h	Roman Hodgson	Deeside AC	19 July 2017	Cheltenham
800 m	2:11.91	Nikita Neary	Carmarthen Harries	26 June 2010	Newport
800 m	2:10.0 h (Note: Not ratified because this race had both male and female athletes racing together.)	Osian Jones	Menai	9 July 2005	Connah's Quay
1500 m	4:31.3 h	David Powell	Wolverhampton	26 July 1977	Stretford
75 m hurdles	11.90	Harry hillman	Cardiff AAC	23 July 2011	Cardiff
High jump	1.67 m	Jamie Dalton	Preseli Harries	1992	
Pole vault	3.40 m	Neil Winter	Shaftesbury Barnet	27 July 1986	Yeovil
Long jump	5.31 m	Clive Woolmer	Milford Haven School	1982	
Shot put (3.00 kg)	12.92 m	Salem Mbimu-Kiambi	Cardiff AAC	25 August 2019	Swansea
Discus throw	38.92 m	Chris Hughes	Swansea Harries	1991	
Javelin throw (400 g)	44.80 m	Tom Norton	Cwmbran Harries	2 September 2007	Aberdare

=== U13 (Girls) ===
Event	Record	Athlete	Club	Date	Place
100 m	12.34 (+0.4 m/s)	Nell Desir	Cardiff Archers	11 August 2020	Worthing
200 m	25.66 (−1.4 m/s)	Aliyah Afolabi	Cardiff Archers	28 August 2022	Bedford
200 m	25.58	Aliyah Afolabi	Cardiff Archers	30 April 2022	London
600 m	1:37.3 h	Lisa Lanini	Wrexham AAC	19 March 2000	Wigan
800 m	2:16.1 h	Lisa Lanini	Wrexham AAC	5 August 2000	Wrexham
1500 m	4:44.35	Libby Hale	Swansea Harriers	31 July 2021	Newport
70 m hurdles	11.13 (−1.5 m/s)	Carys Poole	Swansea Harriers	16 July 2016	Newport
High jump	1.68 m	Julia Charlton	Carmarthen Harriers	6 August 1978	Dublin, Ireland
Pole vault	2.40 m	Carys Jones	Carmarthen Harries	3 August 2011	Stoke Gifford
Pole vault	2.40 m	Rhianydd Llewellyn	Bridgend AC	27 August 2006	Cardiff
Long jump	5.18 m NWI	Olivia Schrimshaw	Deeside AAC	25 September 2021	Stretford
Long jump	5.43 m NWI	Katriel Udoh	Swansea Harriers	19 May 2024	Gloucester
Shot put (2.72 kg)	11.81 m	Adele Nicoll	Oswestry Olympians	31 August 2009	Birmingham
Discus throw (0.75 kg)	31.68 m	Adele Nicoll	Oswestry Olympians	5 September 2009	Colwyn bay
Javelin throw (400 g)	37.38 m	Bethan Rees	Cannock & Staffs	8 September 2012	Bedford
4 × 100 m relay					
