= 1980 European Tour =

Golf tour season

1980 European Tour season
- Duration: 10 April 1980 – 4 October 1980
- Number of official events: 23
- Most wins: (Spain) Seve Ballesteros (4)
- Official money list: (Scotland) Sandy Lyle
- Sir Henry Cotton Rookie of the Year: (England) Paul Hoad

The 1980 European Tour, titled as the 1980 PGA European Golf Tour, was the ninth season of the European Tour, the main professional golf tour in Europe since its inaugural season in 1972.

== Changes for 1980 ==
There were several changes from the previous season, with the addition of the Newcastle Brown "900" Open, the Merseyside International Open and the Bob Hope British Classic; and the loss of the British PGA Matchplay Championship, the Portuguese Open and the Belgian Open.

The tour's money list was retitled as the "Official money list", having previously been known as the "Order of Merit".

== Schedule ==
The following table lists official events during the 1980 season.

Date	Tournament	Host country	Purse (£)	Winner (Note: The number in brackets after each winner's name is the number of European Tour events they had won up to and including that tournament. This information is only shown for European Tour members and are inclusive of the three United States-based major championships which were included on the schedule for the first time in 1998, with earlier editions having retrospectively been recognised as official tour wins.)	Notes
13 Apr	Masters Tournament	United States	US$360,000	(Spain) Seve Ballesteros (11)	Major championship (Note: Unofficial money event at the time, but retrospectively counted as an official win.)
20 Apr	Italian Open	Italy	32,500	(Italy) Massimo Mannelli (1)	
27 Apr	Madrid Open	Spain	30,000	(Spain) Seve Ballesteros (12)	
4 May	Benson & Hedges Spanish Open	Spain	42,500	(Northern Ireland) Eddie Polland (4)	
11 May	Paco Rabanne Open de France	France	37,500	(Australia) Greg Norman (3)	
18 May	Martini International	England	55,000	(Spain) Seve Ballesteros (13)	
26 May	Sun Alliance PGA Championship	England	70,000	(England) Nick Faldo (3)	
1 Jun	Avis Jersey Open	Jersey	35,000	(Spain) José María Cañizares (2)	
8 Jun	Newcastle Brown "900" Open	England	42,000	(Republic of Ireland) Des Smyth (2)	New tournament
15 Jun	U.S. Open	United States	US$355,000	(United States) Jack Nicklaus (n/a)	Major championship
22 Jun	Cold Shield Greater Manchester Open	England	35,000	(Republic of Ireland) Des Smyth (3)	
29 Jun	Coral Welsh Classic	Wales	35,000	(Scotland) Sandy Lyle (4)	
6 Jul	Scandinavian Enterprise Open	Sweden	50,000	(Australia) Greg Norman (4)	
12 Jul	Mazda Cars English Classic	England	55,000	(Spain) Manuel Piñero (4)	
20 Jul	The Open Championship	Scotland	200,000	(United States) Tom Watson (4)	Major championship
27 Jul	Dutch Open	Netherlands	32,500	(Spain) Seve Ballesteros (14)	
10 Aug	Benson & Hedges International Open	England	80,000	(Australia) Graham Marsh (7)	
10 Aug	PGA Championship	United States	US$375,000	(United States) Jack Nicklaus (n/a)	Major championship
17 Aug	Carroll's Irish Open	Ireland	70,000	(England) Mark James (4)	
24 Aug	Braun German Open	West Germany	45,000	(Zimbabwe) Mark McNulty (2)	
31 Aug	Swiss Open	Switzerland	50,000	(Zimbabwe) Nick Price (1)	
7 Sep	European Open Championship	England	105,000	(United States) Tom Kite (n/a)	
13 Sep	Merseyside International Open	England	15,000	(England) Ian Mosey (1)	New tournament
21 Sep	Haig Whisky TPC	England	55,000	(Scotland) Bernard Gallacher (6)	
28 Sep	Bob Hope British Classic	England	90,000	(Spain) José María Cañizares (3)	New tournament Pro-Am
4 Oct	Dunlop Masters	Wales	60,000	(West Germany) Bernhard Langer (1)	

=== Unofficial events ===
The following events were sanctioned by the European Tour, but did not carry official money, nor were wins official.

Date	Tournament	Host country	Purse (£)	Winner(s)	Notes
14 Sep	Hennessy Cognac Cup	England	n/a	Team GB&I	Team event
12 Oct	Suntory World Match Play Championship	England	100,000	(Australia) Greg Norman	Limited-field event
19 Oct	Trophée Lancôme	France	45,000	(United States) Lee Trevino	
26 Oct	Cacharel World Under-25 Championship	France	n/a	(United States) Jack Renner	
14 Dec	World Cup	Colombia	n/a	(Canada) Dan Halldorson and (Canada) Jim Nelford	Team event
14 Dec	World Cup Individual Trophy	Colombia	n/a	(Scotland) Sandy Lyle	

== Official money list ==
The official money list was based on prize money won during the season, calculated in Pound sterling.

Position	Player	Prize money (£)
1	(Scotland) Sandy Lyle	43,346
2	(Australia) Greg Norman	43,068
3	(Spain) Seve Ballesteros	42,376
4	(England) Nick Faldo	35,523
5	(Scotland) Brian Barnes	32,880
6	(England) Mark James	29,991
7	(Spain) José María Cañizares	29,840
8	(Scotland) Ken Brown	28,949
9	(West Germany) Bernhard Langer	26,920
10	(Republic of Ireland) Des Smyth	24,618

== Awards ==
Award	Winner	Ref.
Sir Henry Cotton Rookie of the Year	(England) Paul Hoad	
