= 1984 European Tour =

Golf tour season

1984 European Tour season
- Duration: 12 April 1984 – 4 November 1984
- Number of official events: 26 (Note: One further tournament was scheduled but was cancelled.)
- Most wins: (West Germany) Bernhard Langer (4)
- Order of Merit: (West Germany) Bernhard Langer
- Sir Henry Cotton Rookie of the Year: (Wales) Philip Parkin

The 1984 European Tour, titled as the 1984 PGA European Tour, was the 13th season of the European Tour, the main professional golf tour in Europe since its inaugural season in 1972.

== Changes for 1984 ==
The season was made up of 26 tournaments counting for the Order of Merit, and some non-counting "Approved Special Events".

There were several changes from the previous season, with the addition of the Monte Carlo Open, the Celtic International and the Cannes Open; and the loss of the Martini International and the British Masters. In addition the English Golf Classic was merged with the Lawrence Batley International.

Soon after the schedule was revealed, it was announced that the Bob Hope British Classic had been cancelled; the Sanyo Open was brought forward from October to fill the vacated dates.

=== Order of Merit name change ===
The money list reverted to its original title as the "Order of Merit", having been known as the "Official money list" for the preceding four seasons. In March, it was announced that Sperry Corporation would title sponsor the Order of Merit, being renamed as the Sperry Order of Merit.

== Schedule ==
The following table lists official events during the 1984 season.

| Date | Tournament | Host country | Purse (£) | Winner (Note: The number in brackets after each winner's name is the number of European Tour events they had won up to and including that tournament. This information is only shown for European Tour members and are inclusive of the three United States-based major championships which were included on the schedule for the first time in 1998, with earlier editions having retrospectively been recognised as official tour wins.) | Notes |
|---|---|---|---|---|---|
| 15 Apr | Tunisian Open | Tunisia | 65,000 | (Scotland) Sam Torrance (8) | |
| 15 Apr | Masters Tournament | United States | US$600,000 | (United States) Ben Crenshaw (n/a) | Major championship (Note: Unofficial money event at the time, but retrospectively counted as an official win.) |
| 29 Apr | Cepsa Madrid Open | Spain | 85,000 | (England) Howard Clark (3) | |
| 6 May | Italian Open | Italy | 85,000 | (Scotland) Sandy Lyle (9) | |
| 13 May | Car Care Plan International | England | 100,000 | (England) Nick Faldo (11) | |
| 20 May | Peugeot Open de France | France | 85,000 | (West Germany) Bernhard Langer (8) | |
| 28 May | Whyte & Mackay PGA Championship | England | 150,000 | (England) Howard Clark (4) | |
| 3 Jun | Jersey Open | Jersey | 60,000 | (Scotland) Bernard Gallacher (10) | |
| 10 Jun | St. Mellion Timeshare TPC | England | 100,000 | (Brazil) Jaime Gonzalez (1) | |
| 17 Jun | Timex Open | France | 75,000 | (Australia) Mike Clayton (1) | |
| 17 Jun | U.S. Open | United States | US$600,000 | (United States) Fuzzy Zoeller (n/a) | Major championship |
| 24 Jun | Monte Carlo Open | France | 75,000 | (England) Ian Mosey (2) | New tournament |
| 1 Jul | Glasgow Open | Scotland | 80,000 | (Scotland) Ken Brown (3) | |
| 8 Jul | Scandinavian Enterprise Open | Sweden | 135,000 | (Wales) Ian Woosnam (3) | |
| 14 Jul | Lawrence Batley International Golf Classic | England | 110,000 | (Spain) José Rivero (1) | |
| 22 Jul | The Open Championship | Scotland | 425,000 | (Spain) Seve Ballesteros (23) | Major championship |
| 29 Jul | KLM Dutch Open | Netherlands | 100,000 | (West Germany) Bernhard Langer (9) | |
| 5 Aug | Carroll's Irish Open | Ireland | 110,000 | (West Germany) Bernhard Langer (10) | |
| 12 Aug | Celtic International | Ireland | 75,000 | (Scotland) Gordon Brand Jnr (3) | New tournament |
| 19 Aug | Benson & Hedges International Open | England | 120,000 | (Scotland) Sam Torrance (9) | |
| 19 Aug | PGA Championship | United States | US$700,000 | (United States) Lee Trevino (n/a) | Major championship |
| 26 Aug | Lufthansa German Open | West Germany | 100,000 | (Australia) Wayne Grady (1) | |
| 2 Sep | Ebel European Masters Swiss Open | Switzerland | 160,000 | (Canada) Jerry Anderson (1) | |
| 9 Sep | Panasonic European Open | England | 150,000 | (Scotland) Gordon Brand Jnr (4) | |
| ~~23 Sep~~ | Bob Hope British Classic | England | – | Cancelled | Pro-Am |
| 23 Sep; ~~28 Oct~~ | Sanyo Open | Spain | 100,000 | (Scotland) Sam Torrance (10) | |
| 7 Oct | Trophée Lancôme | France | 110,000 | (Scotland) Sandy Lyle (10) | Limited-field event |
| 14 Oct | Benson & Hedges Spanish Open | Spain | 85,000 | (West Germany) Bernhard Langer (11) | |
| 21 Oct | Compagnie de Chauffe Cannes Open | France | 75,000 | (South Africa) David Frost (1) | New to European Tour |
| 4 Nov | Portuguese Open | Portugal | 55,000 | (Zimbabwe) Tony Johnstone (1) | |

=== Unofficial events ===
The following events were sanctioned by the European Tour, but did not carry official money, nor were wins official.

| Date | Tournament | Host country | Purse (£) | Winner(s) | Notes |
|---|---|---|---|---|---|
| 16 Sep | Hennessy Cognac Cup | England | n/a | Team England | Team event |
| 30 Sep | Suntory World Match Play Championship | England | 150,000 | (Spain) Seve Ballesteros | Limited-field event |
| 18 Nov | World Cup | Italy | US$150,000 | (Spain) José María Cañizares and (Spain) José Rivero | Team event |
| 18 Nov | World Cup Individual Trophy | Italy | US$150,000 | (Spain) José María Cañizares | |

== Order of Merit ==
The Order of Merit was titled as the Sperry Order of Merit and was based on prize money won during the season, calculated in Pound sterling.

| Position | Player | Prize money (£) |
|---|---|---|
| 1 | (West Germany) Bernhard Langer | 139,344 |
| 2 | (Scotland) Sam Torrance | 112,657 |
| 3 | (England) Howard Clark | 101,903 |
| 4 | (Scotland) Sandy Lyle | 99,649 |
| 5 | (Spain) Seve Ballesteros | 96,503 |
| 6 | (Wales) Ian Woosnam | 62,080 |
| 7 | (Scotland) Gordon Brand Jnr | 59,116 |
| 8 | (Spain) José María Cañizares | 57,418 |
| 9 | (Canada) Jerry Anderson | 56,121 |
| 10 | (South Africa) David Frost | 55,642 |

== Awards ==
| Award | Winner | Ref. |
|---|---|---|
| Sir Henry Cotton Rookie of the Year | (Wales) Philip Parkin | |
