= Ian Mosey =

English golfer (born 1951)

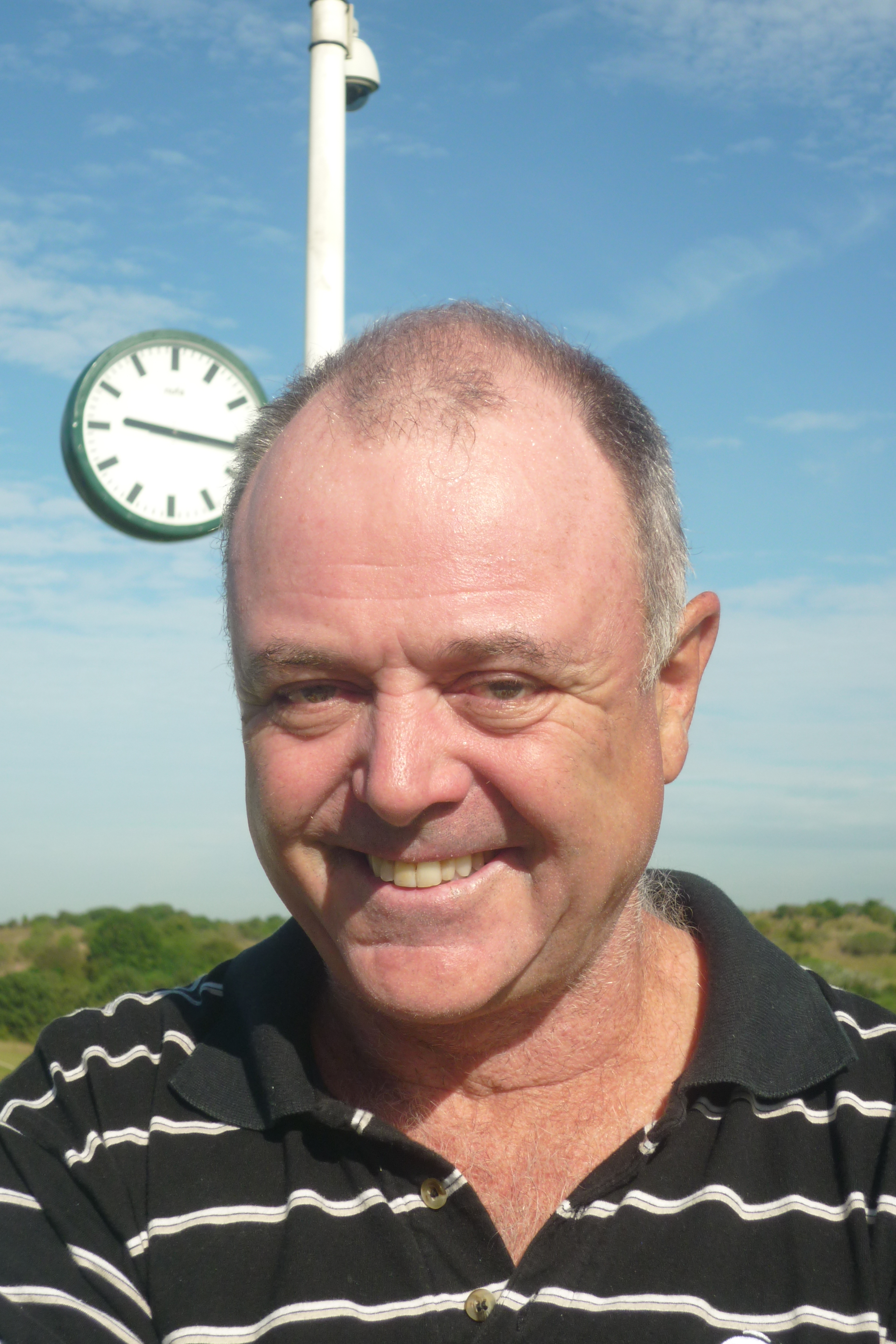

Personal information
- Full name: Ian James Mosey
- Nationality: England
- Born: 29 August 1951 (age 75) Keighley, West Riding of Yorkshire, England
- Height: 5 ft 10 in (1.78 m)

Career
- Sport: Golf
- Turned professional: 1972
- Former tours: European Tour; Southern Africa Tour; European Seniors Tour
- Professional wins: 4

Number of wins by tour
- European Tour: 2
- Sunshine Tour: 2

Best results in major championships
- Masters Tournament: DNP
- PGA Championship: DNP
- U.S. Open: DNP
- The Open Championship: T38: 1976

Ian James Mosey (born 29 August 1951) is an English professional golfer.

== Career ==
Mosey was born in Keighley, West Riding of Yorkshire, and is the son of cricket writer Don Mosey.

Mosey turned professional in 1972 and spent almost twenty years on the European Tour, during which his best Order of Merit ranking was 29th, achieved in both 1984 and 1986. He won two tournaments on the European Tour, the 1980 Merseyside International Open and the 1984 Monte Carlo Open.

Mosey also played in South Africa in the offseason and won two titles in nearby countries. He joined the European Seniors Tour in 2001, but has not won at that level.

== Personal life ==
In March 1981, Mosey married Mandy.

== Professional wins (4) ==
=== European Tour wins (2) ===
No.	Date	Tournament	Winning score	Margin of victory	Runner(s)-up
1	13 Sep 1980	Merseyside International Open	+6 (72-74-76=222)	Playoff	(England) Tony Jacklin
2	24 Jun 1984	Monte Carlo Open	−7 (68-63=131) (Note: Shortened to 36 holes due to weather.)	4 strokes	(Spain) Manuel Calero, (Australia) Peter Fowler

European Tour playoff record (1–0)

No.	Year	Tournament	Opponent	Result
1	1980	Merseyside International Open	(England) Tony Jacklin	Won with par on first extra hole

=== Southern Africa Tour wins (2) ===
No.	Date	Tournament	Winning score	Margin of victory	Runner(s)-up
1	13 Dec 1980	Kalahari Diamond Classic	−11 (69-69-67=205)	1 stroke	(South Africa) Hugh Baiocchi
2	21 Feb 1981	Holiday Inns Pro-Am	−10 (70-68-71-69=278)	Playoff	(England) Nigel Burch, (South Africa) Allan Henning

Southern Africa Tour playoff record (1–0)

No.	Year	Tournament	Opponents	Result
1	1981	Holiday Inns Pro-Am	(England) Nigel Burch, (South Africa) Allan Henning	Won with birdie on first extra hole

== Results in major championships ==
Tournament	1970	1971	1972	1973	1974	1975	1976	1977	1978	1979
The Open Championship	CUT		CUT		CUT		T38	T58		CUT

Tournament	1980	1981	1982	1983	1984	1985	1986	1987
The Open Championship	CUT	CUT		CUT		CUT		CUT

Note: Mosey only played in The Open Championship.

Did not play

CUT = missed the half-way cut (3rd round cut in 1972, 1974 and 1983 Open Championships)
"T" = tied
