= Paul Curry (golfer) =

English golfer (born 1961)

Personal information
- Full name: Paul Andrew Curry
- Nationality: England
- Born: 5 May 1961 (age 65) Colchester, Essex, England
- Height: 5 ft 11 in (1.80 m)
- Weight: 160 lb (73 kg; 11 st)

Career
- Sport: Golf
- Turned professional: 1979
- Former tours: PGA Tour; European Tour; PGA EuroPro Tour; European Seniors Tour
- Professional wins: 3

Number of wins by tour
- European Tour: 1
- Other: 2

Best results in major championships
- Masters Tournament: DNP
- PGA Championship: DNP
- U.S. Open: DNP
- The Open Championship: T54: 2001

Paul Andrew Curry (born 5 May 1961) is an English golfer.

== Career ==
Curry was born in Colchester.

In 1979, Curry turned professional. He played on the European Tour through most of the 1980s and 1990s. He finished in the top one hundred of the Order of Merit ten times, with a best of 33rd place in 1994, the year he won his only European Tour title, the Jersey European Airways Open.

Having lost his place on the European Tour, Curry moved to the United States and won a PGA Tour card at the 1999 qualifying school. During his rookie season in 2000, he made only seven cuts in twenty five outings to lose his playing status on the tour. He made several return trips to the qualifying tournament without success.

Curry played several events on the second tier Nationwide Tour in 2001, and latterly has competed on the third-tier NGA Hooters Tour.

== Professional wins (4) ==
=== European Tour wins (1) ===
No.	Date	Tournament	Winning score	Margin of victory	Runner-up
1	19 Jun 1994	Jersey European Airways Open	−22 (73-62-68-63=266)	3 strokes	(England) Mark James

=== PGA EuroPro Tour wins (2) ===
No.	Date	Tournament	Winning score	Margin of victory	Runner(s)-up
1	30 Jun 2005	Stoke by Nayland Club International Open	−7 (70-67-72=209)	Playoff	(England) Colin Mitchell, (Netherlands) Inder van Weerelt
2	29 Jun 2006	Bartercard Stoke by Nayland International Open (2)	−7 (71-70-69=210)	Playoff	(England) Mark Ramsdale

=== NGA Hooters Tour wins (1) ===
No.	Date	Tournament	Winning score	Margin of victory	Runner-up
1	15 Jan 2009	Bridgestone Winter Series at Forest Lake GC	−15 (66-69-66=201)	1 stroke	(United States) Jeff Corr

== Results in major championships ==
Tournament	1990	1991	1992	1993	1994	1995	1996	1997	1998	1999	2000	2001
The Open Championship	CUT				CUT			CUT				T54

Note: Curry only played in The Open Championship.

Did not play

CUT = missed the half-way cut
"T" = tied

== See also ==
- 1999 PGA Tour Qualifying School graduates
