= Open de España =

Spanish golf tournament

Coordinates: 40.4484°N 3.7593°W

Tournament information
- Location: Madrid, Spain
- Established: 1912
- Course: Club de Campo Villa de Madrid
- Par: 71
- Length: 7,112 yards (6,503 m)
- Tour: European Tour
- Format: Stroke play
- Prize fund: US$3,250,000
- Month played: October

Tournament record score
- Aggregate: 259 Jon Rahm (2022)
- To par: −25 as above

Current champion
- (Scotland) Grant Forrest

Location map
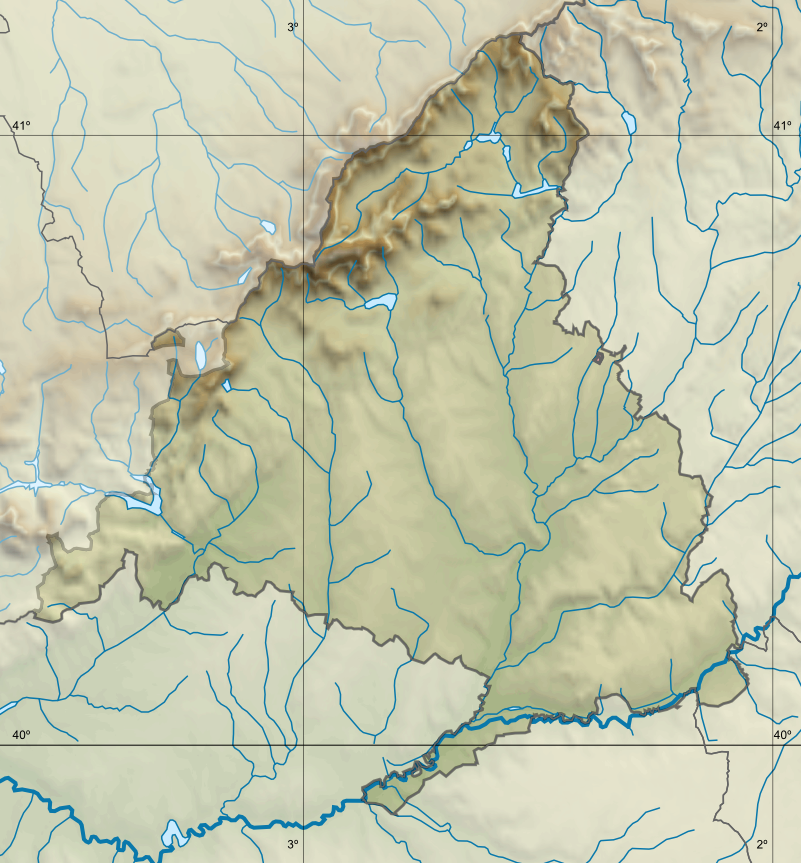
- Location in Spain Location in the Community of Madrid

The Open de España (formerly the Spanish Open) is the national open golf championship of Spain. It was founded in 1912 and has been part of the European Tour's schedule since the inception of the Tour in 1972. The tournament has been played in April or May, except for a five-year period in the early 1980s and since the 2019 edition, when the tournament was moved to October. In 2005, it was one of five European Tour events to be held in Spain. Former champions include Arnold Palmer, Seve Ballesteros, Bernhard Langer, Nick Faldo and Jon Rahm.

The tournament has been organized by the Royal Spanish Golf Federation. In April 2019, a partnership between the Royal Spanish Golf Federation, the European Tour, and Madrid Trophy Promotion (MTP) was announced. This agreement meant that MTP became the organizer of the event for the next 5 years. MTP is also the organizer of the Mutua Madrid Open, a professional tennis tournament.

== Winners ==
Year	Winner	Score	To par	Margin of victory	Runner(s)-up
Open de España
2026	(Scotland) Grant Forrest	270	−14	1 stroke	(Spain) Eugenio Chacarra (France) Victor Perez
2025	(England) Marco Penge	269	−15	Playoff	(England) Dan Brown
Acciona Open de España
2024	(Spain) Ángel Hidalgo	270	−14	Playoff	(Spain) Jon Rahm
2023	(France) Matthieu Pavon	261	−23	4 strokes	(South Africa) Zander Lombard
2022	(Spain) Jon Rahm (3)	259	−25	6 strokes	(France) Matthieu Pavon
2021	(Spain) Rafa Cabrera-Bello	265	−19	Playoff	(Spain) Adri Arnaus
Mutuactivos Open de España
2020	Cancelled due to COVID-19 pandemic				
2019	(Spain) Jon Rahm (2)	262	−22	5 strokes	(Spain) Rafa Cabrera-Bello
Open de España
2018	(Spain) Jon Rahm	268	−20	2 strokes	(Republic of Ireland) Paul Dunne
2017: No tournament
Real Club Valderrama Open de España
2016	(England) Andrew Johnston	285	+1	1 stroke	(Netherlands) Joost Luiten
Open de España
2015	(England) James Morrison	278	−10	4 strokes	(France) Édouard España (England) David Howell (Spain) Miguel Ángel Jiménez (Italy) Francesco Molinari
2014	(Spain) Miguel Ángel Jiménez	284	−4	Playoff	(Australia) Richard Green (Belgium) Thomas Pieters
2013	(France) Raphaël Jacquelin	283	−5	Playoff	(Chile) Felipe Aguilar (Germany) Maximilian Kieffer
Reale Seguros Open de España
2012	(Italy) Francesco Molinari	280	−8	3 strokes	(Spain) Alejandro Cañizares (Denmark) Søren Kjeldsen (Spain) Pablo Larrazábal
Open de España
2011	(South Africa) Thomas Aiken	278	−10	2 strokes	(Denmark) Anders Hansen
2010	(Spain) Álvaro Quirós	277	−11	Playoff	(England) James Morrison
2009	(France) Thomas Levet	270	−18	2 strokes	(Paraguay) Fabrizio Zanotti
2008	(Republic of Ireland) Peter Lawrie	273	−15	Playoff	(Spain) Ignacio Garrido
2007	(South Africa) Charl Schwartzel	272	−16	1 stroke	(India) Jyoti Randhawa
Andalucía Open de España Valle Romano
2006	(Sweden) Niclas Fasth	270	−18	Playoff	(England) John Bickerton
Jazztel Open de España en Andalucía
2005	(Sweden) Peter Hanson	280	−8	Playoff	(Sweden) Peter Gustafsson
Canarias Open de España
2004	(France) Christian Cévaër	271	−9	1 stroke	(Argentina) Ricardo González (Sweden) Peter Hedblom (Wales) David Park
2003	(England) Kenneth Ferrie	266	−22	Playoff	(Sweden) Peter Hedblom (Republic of Ireland) Peter Lawrie
2002	(Spain) Sergio García	275	−13	4 strokes	(Italy) Emanuele Canonica
Via Digital Open de España
2001	(Sweden) Robert Karlsson	277	−11	2 strokes	(France) Jean-François Remésy
Peugeot Open de España
2000	(England) Brian Davis	274	−14	3 strokes	(Austria) Markus Brier
1999	(Sweden) Jarmo Sandelin	267	−21	4 strokes	(Spain) Ignacio Garrido (Spain) Miguel Ángel Jiménez (Republic of Ireland) Paul McGinley
1998	(Denmark) Thomas Bjørn	267	−21	1 stroke	(Australia) Greg Chalmers (Spain) José María Olazábal
1997	(England) Mark James (2)	277	−11	Playoff	(Australia) Greg Norman
Peugeot Spanish Open
1996	(Republic of Ireland) Pádraig Harrington	272	−16	4 strokes	(Scotland) Gordon Brand Jnr
1995	(Spain) Seve Ballesteros (3)	274	−14	2 strokes	(Spain) Ignacio Garrido (Spain) José Rivero
1994	(Scotland) Colin Montgomerie	277	−11	1 stroke	(England) Richard Boxall (Zimbabwe) Mark McNulty (England) Mark Roe
1993	(Sweden) Joakim Haeggman	275	−13	2 strokes	(South Africa) Ernie Els (England) Nick Faldo
1992	(England) Andrew Sherborne	271	−17	1 stroke	(England) Nick Faldo
1991	(Argentina) Eduardo Romero	275	−13	Playoff	(Spain) Seve Ballesteros
1990	(Australia) Rodger Davis	277	−11	1 stroke	(England) Nick Faldo (Australia) Peter Fowler (West Germany) Bernhard Langer
1989	(West Germany) Bernhard Langer (2)	281	−7	3 strokes	(Spain) José María Cañizares (England) Paul Carrigill
1988	(England) Mark James	262	−18	3 strokes	(England) Nick Faldo
1987	(England) Nick Faldo	286	−2	2 strokes	(South Africa) Hugh Baiocchi (Spain) Seve Ballesteros
1986	(England) Howard Clark	272	−16	1 stroke	(Australia) Ian Baker-Finch
Benson & Hedges Spanish Open
1985	(Spain) Seve Ballesteros (2)	266	−14	4 strokes	(Scotland) Gordon Brand Jnr
1984	(West Germany) Bernhard Langer	275	−13	2 strokes	(England) Howard Clark
1983	(Republic of Ireland) Eamonn Darcy	277	−11	1 stroke	(Spain) Manuel Piñero
1982	(Scotland) Sam Torrance	273	−15	8 strokes	(England) Roger Chapman (Scotland) Sandy Lyle (Wales) Ian Woosnam
1981	(Spain) Seve Ballesteros	273	−15	1 stroke	(Scotland) Steve Martin
1980	(Northern Ireland) Eddie Polland (2)	276	−12	5 strokes	(Spain) Seve Ballesteros (England) Mark James
Spanish Open
1979	(South Africa) Dale Hayes (2)	278	−10	2 strokes	(Scotland) Brian Barnes
1978	(Scotland) Brian Barnes	276	−12	2 strokes	(England) Howard Clark
1977	(Scotland) Bernard Gallacher	277	−11	2 strokes	(Spain) Francisco Abreu
1976	(Northern Ireland) Eddie Polland	282	−6	2 strokes	(Australia) Bob Shearer
1975	(United States) Arnold Palmer	283	−5	1 stroke	(South Africa) John Fourie
1974	(United States) Jerry Heard	279	−9	6 strokes	(South Africa) Gary Player
1973	(England) Neil Coles	282	−6	3 strokes	(South Africa) Tienie Britz (Wales) Craig Defoy
1972	(Spain) Antonio Garrido	293	+1	Playoff	(Spain) Valentín Barrios
1971	(South Africa) Dale Hayes	275		1 stroke	(Argentina) Roberto De Vicenzo
1970	(Spain) Ángel Gallardo	284		3 strokes	(England) Neil Coles
1969	(France) Jean Garaïalde	283		1 stroke	(Spain) Valentín Barrios
1968	(Australia) Bob Shaw	286		Playoff	(Australia) Frank Phillips (Spain) Sebastián Miguel
1967	(Spain) Sebastián Miguel (3)	265		Playoff	(Australia) Randall Vines
1966	(Argentina) Roberto De Vicenzo	279		7 strokes	(England) Bernard Hunt
1965: No tournament
1964	(Spain) Ángel Miguel (2)	272		5 strokes	(Spain) Ramón Sota
1963	(Spain) Ramón Sota	287		8 strokes	(Spain) Valentín Barrios
1962: No tournament
1961	(Spain) Ángel Miguel	267		1 stroke	(Spain) Jaime Gallardo
1960	(Spain) Sebastián Miguel (2)	286		2 strokes	(Spain) Ramón Sota
1959	(Australia) Peter Thomson	286		2 strokes	(France) Jean Garaïalde (England) Syd Scott
1958	(England) Peter Alliss (2)	268		10 strokes	(Scotland) John Panton
1957	(England) Max Faulkner (3)	283		6 strokes	(England) Henry Cotton
1956	(England) Peter Alliss	285		6 strokes	(England) Bernard Hunt
1955	(France) Henri de Lamaze (a)	271		3 strokes	(Spain) Ángel Miguel
1954	(Spain) Sebastián Miguel	268		6 strokes	(Spain) Ángel Miguel
1953	(England) Max Faulkner (2)	271		6 strokes	(Spain) Carlos Sellés
1952	(England) Max Faulkner	275		2 strokes	(Scotland) Tom Haliburton
1951	(Spain) Mariano Provencio (4)	281		1 stroke	(France) Henri de Lamaze (a)
1950	(Argentina) Antonio Cerdá	277		3 strokes	(Scotland) Jimmy Adams
1949	(Spain) Marcelino Morcillo (3)	280			
1948	(Spain) Marcelino Morcillo (2)	268			
1947	(Brazil) Mário Gonzalez (a)	277		5 strokes	(Spain) Marcelino Morcillo
1946	(Spain) Marcelino Morcillo	281			
1945	(Spain) Carlos Celles	274			
1944	(Spain) Nicasio Sagardia				
1943	(Spain) Mariano Provencio (3)	286			
1942	(Spain) Gabriel González (4)	264			
1941	(Spain) Mariano Provencio (2)	283			
1940	(Spain) Gabriel González (3)				
1936–1939: No tournament
1935	(Spain) Tomás Cayarga	279			(Spain) Mariano Provencio
1934	(Spain) Mariano Provencio	276			(Spain) Francisco Alonso
1933	(Spain) Gabriel González (2)	270			(Spain) Francisco Alonso
1932	(Spain) Gabriel González	272			(Spain) Tomás Cayarga
1931: No tournament
1930	(Spain) Joaquin Bernardino (2)	291			(Spain) Gabriel González
1929	(France) Eugène Lafitte (2)	285			(France) R. Golias
1928	(France) Arnaud Massy (3)	278			(Spain) Ernesto Céspedes
1927	(France) Arnaud Massy (2)				
1926	(Spain) Joaquin Bernardino	283			(Spain) Emilio Cayarga
1925	(Spain) Ángel de la Torre (5)				
1924: No tournament
1923	(Spain) Ángel de la Torre (4)				
1922: No tournament
1921	(France) Eugène Lafitte	296			(Spain) Ángel de la Torre
1920: No tournament
1919	(Spain) Ángel de la Torre (3)	304			(France) Jean Gassiat
1918: No tournament
1917	(Spain) Ángel de la Torre (2)	288			(France) Claude Gassiat
1916	(Spain) Ángel de la Torre	293			(England) Richard Aitken
1913–1915: No tournament
1912	(France) Arnaud Massy				

== Multiple winners ==
Thirteen men have won the tournament more than once through 2022.

- 5 wins
  - Ángel de la Torre: 1916, 1917, 1919, 1923, 1925
- 4 wins
  - Mariano Provencio: 1934, 1941, 1943, 1951
  - Gabriel Gonzalez: 1932, 1933, 1940, 1942
- 3 wins
  - Arnaud Massy: 1912, 1927, 1928
  - Joaquin Bernardino: 1926, 1930, 1934
  - Marcelino Morcillo: 1946, 1948, 1949
  - Max Faulkner: 1952, 1953, 1957
  - Sebastián Miguel: 1954, 1960, 1967
  - Seve Ballesteros: 1981, 1985, 1995
  - Jon Rahm : 2018, 2019, 2022
- 2 wins
  - Eugène Lafitte: 1921, 1929
  - Peter Alliss: 1956, 1958
  - Ángel Miguel: 1961, 1964
  - Dale Hayes: 1971, 1979
  - Eddie Polland: 1976, 1980
  - Bernhard Langer: 1984, 1989
  - Mark James: 1988, 1997

== See also ==
- Open golf tournament
