= Celtic International =

Golf tournament held in Ireland

Tournament information
- Location: Salthill, Galway, Ireland
- Established: 1984
- Course: Galway Golf Club
- Par: 70
- Tour: European Tour
- Format: Pro-am stroke play
- Prize fund: £75,000
- Month played: August
- Final year: 1984

Tournament record score
- Aggregate: 272 Gordon Brand Jnr
- To par: −8 as above

Final champion
- (Scotland) Gordon Brand Jnr
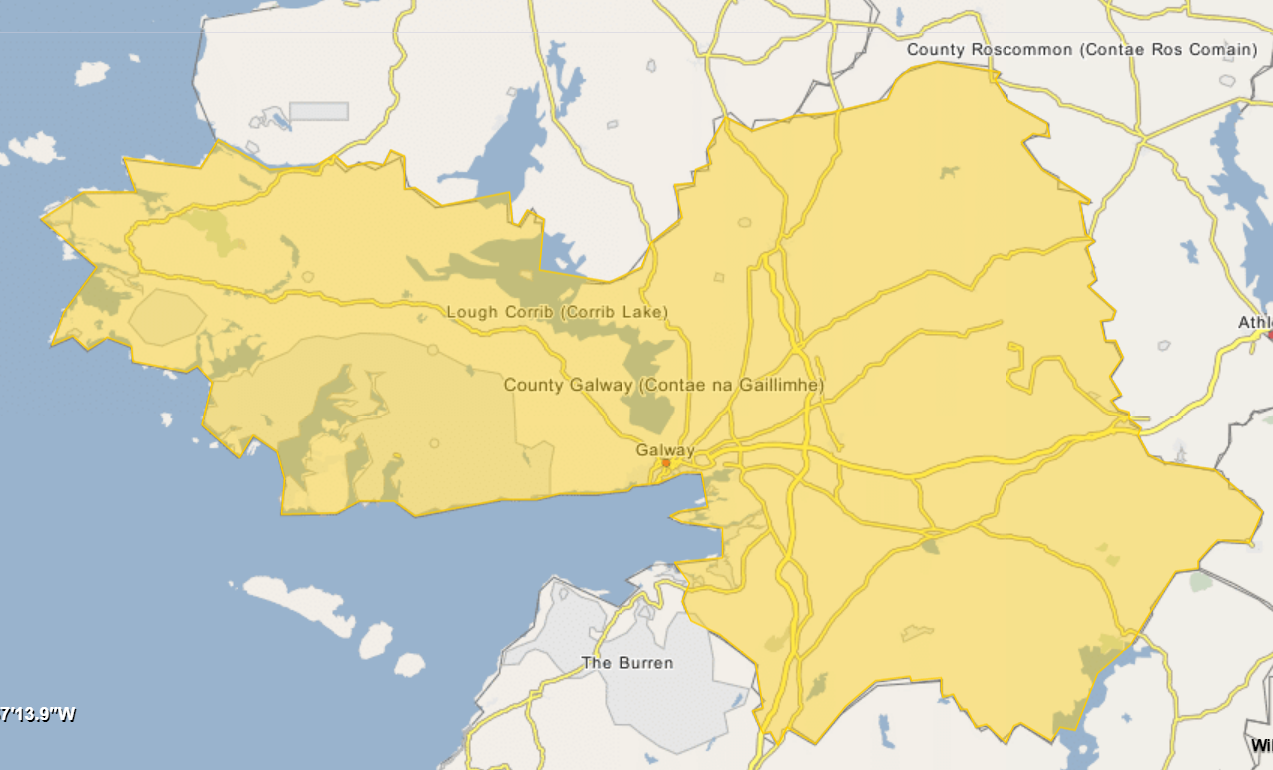
- Location in Ireland Location in County Galway

The Celtic International was a professional golf tournament held at Galway Golf Club in Salthill, Galway, Ireland in 1984. It was an event on the European Tour schedule.

It was a 72-hole pro-am stroke play tournament, and won by Scotland's Gordon Brand Jnr.

== Winners ==
Year	Winner	Score	To par	Margin of victory	Runners-up
1984	(Scotland) Gordon Brand Jnr	272	−8	3 strokes	(Australia) Ian Baker-Finch (Argentina) Vicente Fernández (Scotland) Sandy Lyle
