= Newcastle Brown "900" Open =

Tournament information
- Location: Gosforth, Newcastle upon Tyne, England
- Established: 1980
- Course: Northumberland Golf Club
- Par: 72
- Tour: European Tour
- Format: Stroke play
- Prize fund: £42,000
- Month played: June
- Final year: 1980

Tournament record score
- Aggregate: 276 Des Smyth (1980)
- To par: −12 as above

Final champion
- (Republic of Ireland) Des Smyth
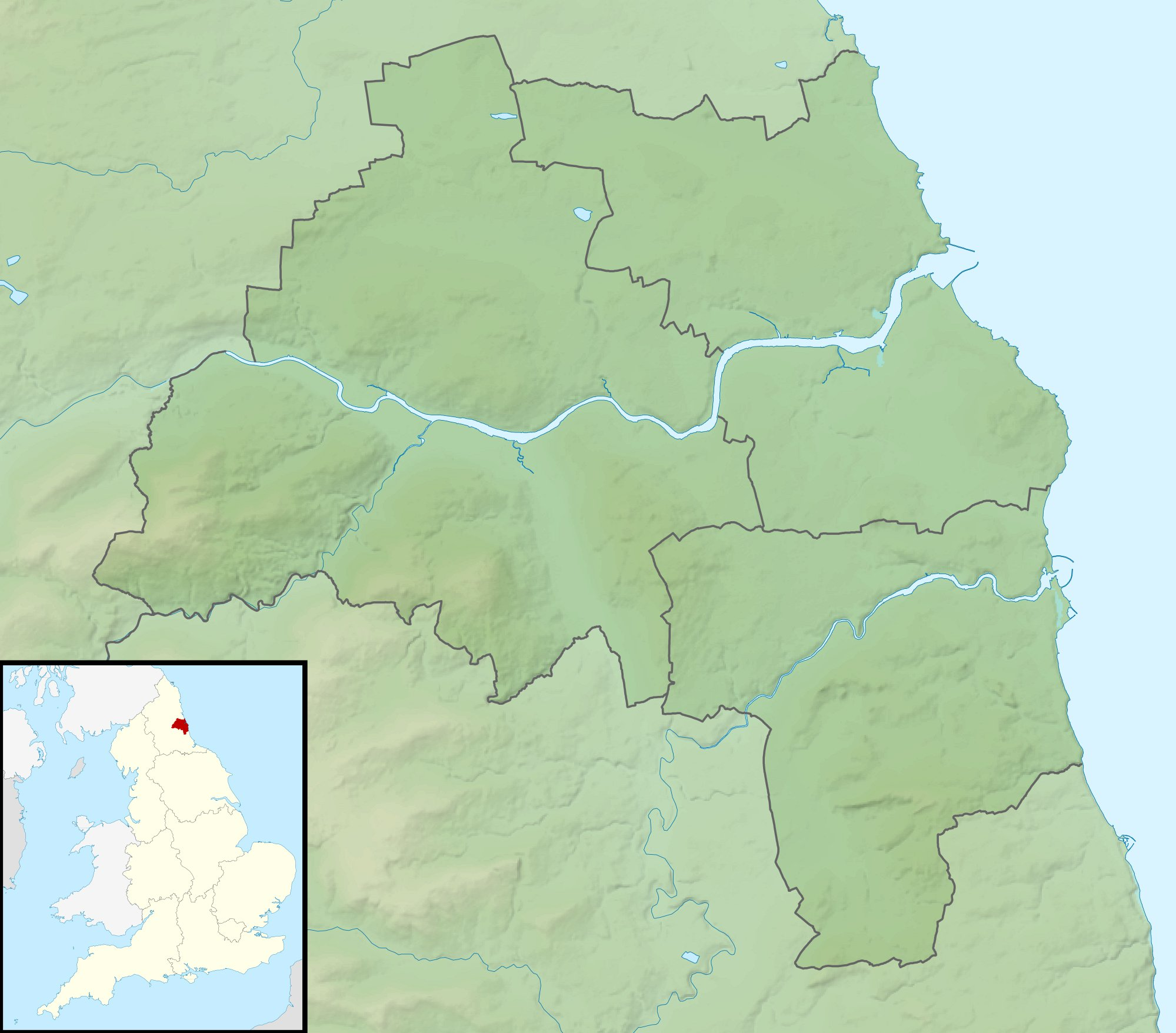
- Location in England Location in Tyne and Wear

The Newcastle Brown "900" Open was a golf tournament on the European Tour in 1980. It was held at Northumberland Golf Club in Gosforth, Newcastle upon Tyne, England and was part of the celebrations marking Newcastle's 900th anniversary.

The tournament was won by Ireland's Des Smyth, who holed a 45-foot putt on the last green to win the £7,000 first prize. It was his first stroke play win on the European Tour.

== Winners ==
Year	Winner	Score	To par	Margin of victory	Runners-up	Winner's share (£)	Ref.
1980	(Republic of Ireland) Des Smyth	276	−12	1 stroke	(England) Graham Burroughs (England) Neil Coles (Australia) Greg Norman	7,000	
