= Michelle Scutt =

British athlete (born 1960)

Michelle Scutt née Probert
Personal information
- Nationality: British
- Born: 17 June 1960 (age 66) Liverpool, England

Sport
- Sport: Athletics
- Event: 400m
- Club: Sale Harriers
Medal record
Women's athletics
Representing Great Britain
Olympic Games
| Bronze medal – third place | 1980 Moscow | 4×400m relay |
Representing Wales
Commonwealth Games
| Silver medal – second place | 1982 Brisbane | 400m |

Michelle Scutt, née Probert (born 17 June 1960) is a female former British Olympic athlete. Competing for Wales at the 1982 Commonwealth Games in Brisbane, Australia, she won a silver medal in the 400 metres, behind Australia's Raelene Boyle.

== Early life ==
Scutt is from Culcheth and attended Culcheth High School.

== Athletics career ==
Probert became the British 400 metres champion after winning the British WAAA Championships title at the 1980 WAAA Championships.

Probert married fellow international athlete Steve Scutt on 18 October 1980 in Culcheth and competed under her married name thereafter. She moved to Loughborough where her husband worked at the university.

Scutt won a bronze medal in the 1980 Summer Olympics in Moscow, running the third leg of the 4 × 400 m relay. She was Welsh champion at 100 m (1978–1982), 200 m (1978, 1980–1982) and 400 m (1979 and 1984).

Scutt regained the WAAA 400 metres title at the 1982 WAAA Championships.

She competed at the 1984 Summer Olympics in Los Angeles in the 400 m reaching the semi-final round, and in the 4 × 400 m relay reaching the final and finishing in fourth place. Her personal best time in the 400 m is 50.63, which she ran in Cwmbran in 1982, at the time a British record and still the Welsh record. In addition to her silver medal for 400 metres at the 1982 Commonwealth Games she also competed in the 200 metres and 4x400 metres relay.
