= 1984 Open Championship =

Coordinates: 56.343°N 2.803°W

- Front cover of the 1984 Open Annual

Tournament information
- Dates: 19–22 July 1984
- Location: St Andrews, Scotland
- Course: Old Course at St Andrews
- Tour(s): European Tour; PGA Tour

Statistics
- Par: 72
- Length: 6,933 yards (6,340 m)
- Field: 156 players 94 after 1st cut 63 after 2nd cut
- Cut: 148 (+4) (1st cut); 219 (+3) (2nd cut)
- Prize fund: £425,000 $550,000
- Winner's share: £55,000 $71,500

Champion
- (Spain) Seve Ballesteros
- 276 (−12)

Location in Scotland
Location in Fife, Scotland

The 1984 Open Championship was a men's major golf championship and the 113th Open Championship, held from 19 to 22 July at the Old Course in St Andrews, Scotland. Seve Ballesteros won his second Open Championship and fourth major title, two strokes ahead of runners-up Bernhard Langer and five-time champion Tom Watson, the defending champion.

In the final round, Ballesteros birdied the 18th hole for 69 while 54-hole co-leader Watson bogeyed the famous 17th (Road) for a 73, which ended his bid for a third consecutive Open.

Ballesteros' famous fist pump after his last putt is one of the enduring images of golf. It was further commemorated during the 2012 Ryder Cup at Medinah, also known as the "Miracle at Medinah" after Europe's famous comeback. It was also the first Ryder Cup after Ballesteros' death due to brain cancer in May 2011 at the age of 54, and in his memory, Team Europe's kit bore the silhouette of Ballesteros' celebration. The team also wore navy blue and white garments – his traditional Sunday colors – for the Sunday singles.

== Course ==
Hole	Name	Yards	Par	Hole	Name	Yards	Par
1	Burn	370	4	10	Bobby Jones	342	4
2	Dyke	411	4	11	High (In)	172	3
3	Cartgate (Out)	371	4	12	Heathery (In)	316	4
4	Ginger Beer	463	4	13	Hole O'Cross (In)	425	4
5	Hole O'Cross (Out)	564	5	14	Long	567	5
6	Heathery (Out)	416	4	15	Cartgate (In)	413	4
7	High (Out)	372	4	16	Corner of the Dyke	382	4
8	Short	178	3	17	Road	461	4
9	End	356	4	18	Tom Morris	354	4
Out		3,501	36	In		3,432	36
Source:				Total		6,933	72

Previous lengths of the course for The Open Championship (since 1950):

- 6,933 yards (6,340 m) - 1978
- 6,957 yards (6,361 m) - 1970
- 6,926 yards (6,333 m) - 1964
- 6,936 yards (6,342 m) - 1960, 1955

== Round summaries ==
=== First round ===
Thursday, 19 July 1984

Place	Player	Score	To par
T1	(United States) Peter Jacobsen	67	−5
T1	(Scotland) Bill Longmuir	67	−5
T1	(Australia) Greg Norman	67	−5
4	(Australia) Ian Baker-Finch	68	−4
T5	(Spain) Seve Ballesteros	69	−3
T5	(Republic of Ireland) Eamonn Darcy	69	−3
T5	(England) Nick Faldo	69	−3
T5	(Brazil) Jaime Gonzalez	69	−3
T5	(United States) Tom Kite	69	−3
T10	(Spain) José María Cañizares	70	−2
T10	(United States) Fred Couples	70	−2
T10	(Scotland) Bernard Gallacher	70	−2
T10	(England) Jeff Hall	70	−2
T10	(United States) Rick Hartmann	70	−2
T10	(England) Mark James	70	−2
T10	(Australia) Graham Marsh	70	−2
T10	(Japan) Tsuneyuki Nakajima	70	−2
T10	(England) Martin Poxon	70	−2
T10	(United States) Lee Trevino	70	−2
T10	(United States) Lanny Wadkins	70	−2

=== Second round ===
Friday, 20 July 1984

Place	Player	Score	To par
1	(Australia) Ian Baker-Finch	68-66=134	−10
T2	(Spain) Seve Ballesteros	69-68=137	−7
T2	(England) Nick Faldo	69-68=137	−7
T2	(United States) Lee Trevino	70-67=137	−7
5	(Scotland) Bill Longmuir	67-71=138	–-6
T6	(United States) Fred Couples	70-69=139	−5
T6	(West Germany) Bernhard Langer	71-68=139	−5
T6	(United States) Lanny Wadkins	70-69=139	−5
T6	(United States) Tom Watson	71-68=139	−5
T10	(Brazil) Jaime Gonzalez	69-71=140	−4
T10	(United States) Peter Jacobsen	67-73=140	−4
T10	(United States) Tom Kite	69-71=140	−4

Amateurs: Sherborne (+2), McEvoy (+4), Olazábal (+5), Sigel (+5), Wood (+8), Hawksworth (+12).

=== Third round ===
Saturday, 21 July 1984

Place	Player	Score	To par
T1	(Australia) Ian Baker-Finch	68-66-71=205	−11
T1	(United States) Tom Watson	71-68-66=205	−11
T3	(Spain) Seve Ballesteros	69-68-70=207	−9
T3	(West Germany) Bernhard Langer	71-68-68=207	−9
T5	(South Africa) Hugh Baiocchi	72-70-70=212	−4
T5	(United States) Lee Trevino	70-67-75=212	−4
T5	(United States) Lanny Wadkins	70-69-73=212	−4
T8	(Spain) José María Cañizares	70-71-72=213	−3
T8	(United States) Fred Couples	70-69-74=213	−3
T8	(England) Nick Faldo	69-68-76=213	−3
T8	(United States) Hale Irwin	75-68-70=213	−3
T8	(United States) Peter Jacobsen	67-73-73=213	−3
T8	(United States) Mark McCumber	74-67-72=213	−3
T8	(United States) Gil Morgan	71-71-71=213	−3
T8	(Northern Ireland) Ronan Rafferty	74-72-67=213	−3

Amateurs: Sherborne (+5), McEvoy (WD)

=== Final round ===
Sunday, 22 July 1984

Place	Player	Score	To par	Money (£)
1	(Spain) Seve Ballesteros	69-68-70-69=276	−12	55,000
T2	(West Germany) Bernhard Langer	71-68-68-71=278	−10	31,900
T2	(United States) Tom Watson	71-68-66-73=278	−10	31,900
T4	(United States) Fred Couples	70-69-74-68=281	−7	19,800
T4	(United States) Lanny Wadkins	70-69-73-69=281	−7	19,800
T6	(England) Nick Faldo	69-68-76-69=282	−6	16,390
T6	(Australia) Greg Norman	67-74-74-67=282	−6	16,390
8	(United States) Mark McCumber	74-67-72-70=283	−5	14,300
T9	(South Africa) Hugh Baiocchi	72-70-70-72=284	−4	11,264
T9	(Australia) Ian Baker-Finch	68-66-71-79=284	−4	11,264
T9	(Australia) Graham Marsh	70-74-73-67=284	−4	11,264
T9	(Northern Ireland) Ronan Rafferty	74-72-67-71=284	−4	11,264
T9	(Scotland) Sam Torrance	74-74-66-70=284	−4	11,264

- The exchange rate at the time was approximately 1.32 dollars (US) per pound sterling.
