= Merseyside International Open =

1980 golf tournament

Tournament information
- Location: Hoylake, Wirral, England
- Established: 1980
- Course: Royal Liverpool Golf Club
- Par: 72
- Tour: European Tour
- Format: Stroke play
- Prize fund: £15,000
- Month played: September
- Final year: 1980

Tournament record score
- Aggregate: 222 Tony Jacklin (1980); 222 Ian Mosey (1980)
- To par: +6 as above

Final champion
- (England) Ian Mosey
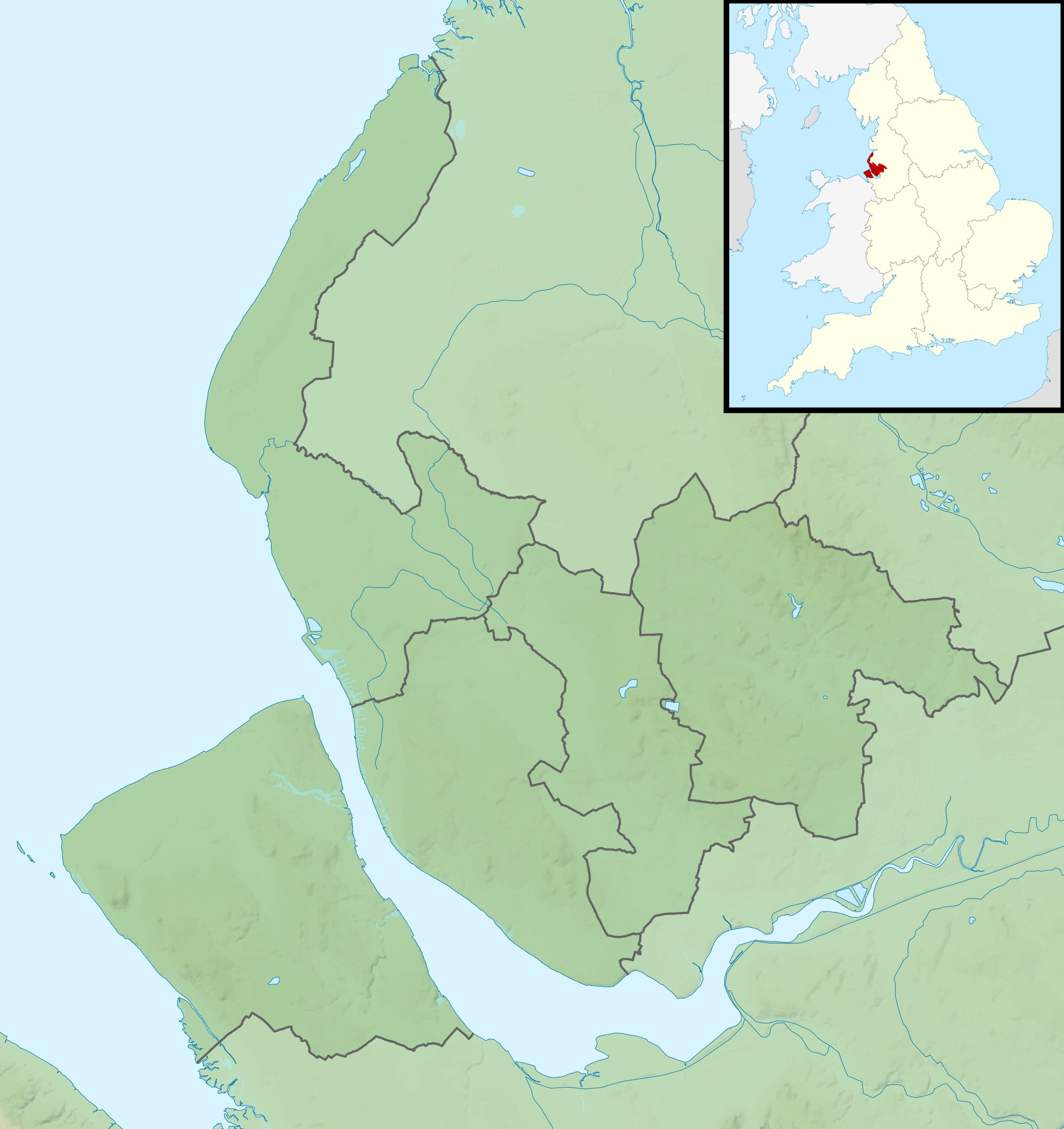
- Location in England Location in Merseyside

The Merseyside International Open was a golf tournament on the European Tour in 1980. It was held at Royal Liverpool Golf Club, Hoylake near Liverpool, England. It was won by England's Ian Mosey, who defeated Tony Jacklin in a playoff. Mosey beat Jacklin at the first extra hole.

== Winners ==
Year	Winner	Score	To par	Margin of victory	Runner-up	Winner's share (£)
1980	(England) Ian Mosey	222	+6	Playoff	(England) Tony Jacklin	2,500
