= Chris Moody =

English golfer (born 1953)

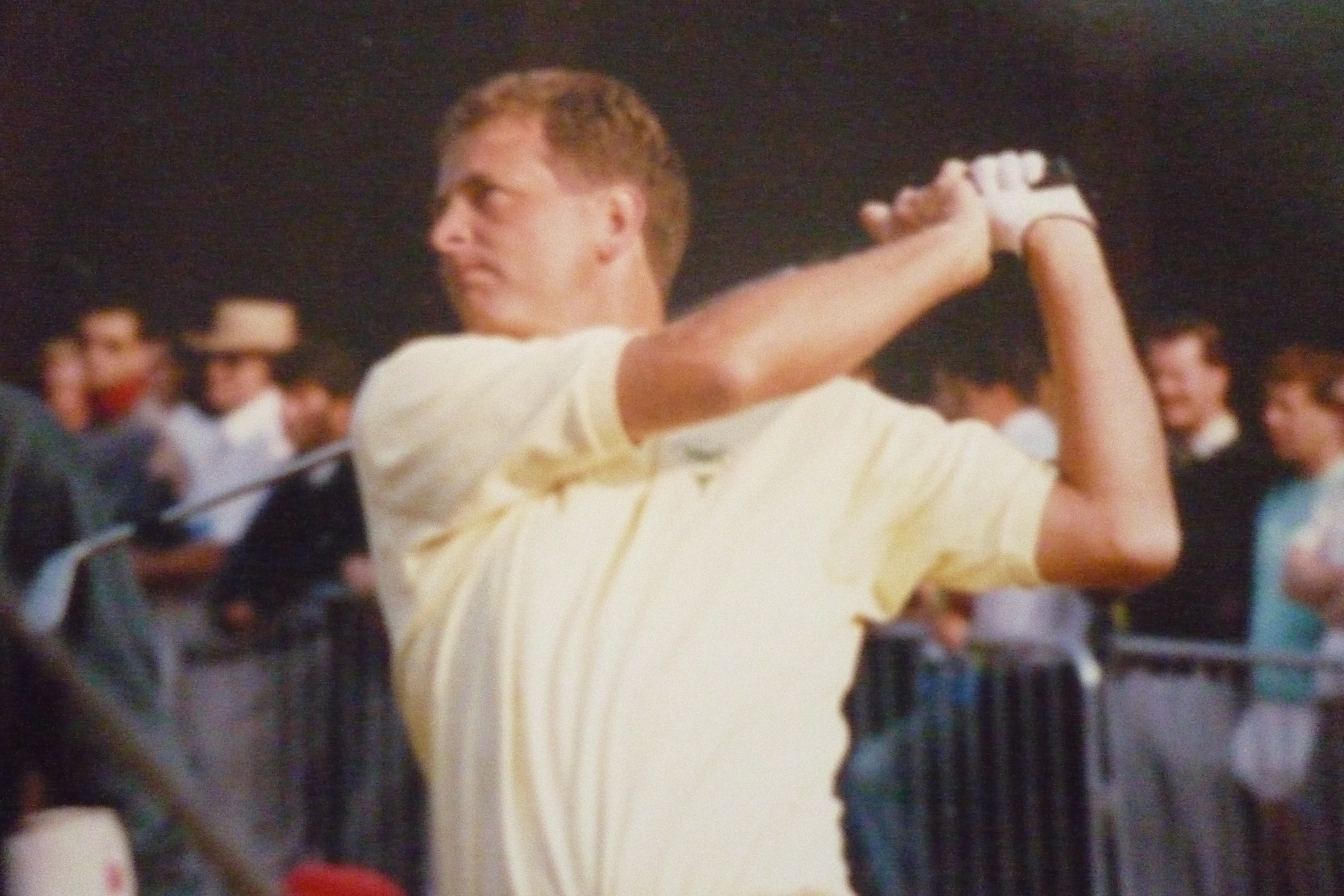
- Moody in 1990

Personal information
- Full name: Chris Moody
- Nationality: England
- Born: 19 October 1953 (age 73)
- Height: 6 ft 2 in (1.88 m)

Career
- Sport: Golf
- Turned professional: 1973
- Former tours: European Tour; European Seniors Tour
- Professional wins: 2

Number of wins by tour
- European Tour: 1
- Other: 1

Best results in major championships
- Masters Tournament: DNP
- PGA Championship: DNP
- U.S. Open: DNP
- The Open Championship: T39: 1983

Chris Moody (born 19 October 1953) is an English professional golfer.

== Career ==
In 1973, Moody turned professional. He joined the European Tour in 1979. Moody made the top one hundred on the European Tour Order of Merit twelve times between 1980 and 1992 with a best ranking of #19 in 1988. It was in 1988 that he collected his only European Title at that year's Ebel European Masters Swiss Open. Moody also had two runner-up finishes on tour.

In 2004, Moody played on the European Seniors Tour but he did not achieve any top ten finishes.

== Professional wins (1) ==
=== European Tour wins (1) ===
No.	Date	Tournament	Winning score	Margin of victory	Runners-up
1	4 Sep 1988	Ebel European Masters Swiss Open	−20 (68-68-67-65=268)	1 stroke	(Spain) Seve Ballesteros, (Sweden) Anders Forsbrand, (Wales) Ian Woosnam

=== Other wins (1) ===
- 1988 Grand Prix Triconfort (France)

== Results in major championships ==
Tournament	1981	1982	1983	1984	1985	1986	1987	1988	1989	1990	1991
The Open Championship	CUT		T39	CUT	CUT		76	CUT	CUT	CUT	T101

Note: Moody only played in The Open Championship.

Did not play

CUT = missed the half-way cut (3rd round cut in 1984 and 1985 Open Championships)
"T" = tied
