= World Senior Championship =

Tournament information
- Established: 1954
- Format: Match play
- Final year: 1978

Tournament record score
- Score: 8 & 6 Al Watrous (1957)

Final champion
- (United States) Joe Jimenez

The World Senior Championship was a golf match held between the winners of the American PGA Seniors' Championship (now Senior PGA Championship) and the British PGA Seniors Championship. It was held from 1954 to 1978. It was a 36-hole match-play event held on a single day with the exception of the first year when it was held over two days. The British PGA Seniors Championship did not start until 1957. In 1954 and 1955 the British competitor was nominated by the British Association of Golf Writers while in 1956 four leading senior golfers played to decide the British entry.

The event was initially sponsored by Teacher's (whisky) and the players competed for the Teacher International Trophy.

From 1954 to 1968 the event was held England or Scotland. From 1969 to 1971 it was played at Bide-A-Wee Golf Course in Portsmouth, Virginia and from 1972 it alternated between Scotland and Bide-A-Wee.

== Winners ==
Year	Venue	Winner	Country	Score	Runner-up	Ref
1978	Whitecraigs Golf Club	Joe Jimenez	United States	5 & 4	(Republic of Ireland) Paddy Skerritt	
1977	Bide-A-Wee Golf Course	Christy O'Connor Snr (2)	Ireland	6 & 5	(United States) Julius Boros	
1976	Whitecraigs Golf Club	Christy O'Connor Snr	Ireland	2 & 1	(United States) Pete Cooper	
1975	Bide-A-Wee Golf Course	Kel Nagle (2)	Australia	1 up	(United States) Charlie Sifford	
1974	Lundin Links	Roberto De Vicenzo	Argentina	5 & 4	(England) Eric Lester	
1973	Bide-A-Wee Golf Course	Sam Snead (5)	United States	41 holes	(Australia) Kel Nagle	
1972	Longniddry Golf Club	Sam Snead (4)	United States	3 & 2	(England) Ken Bousfield	
1971	Bide-A-Wee Golf Course	Kel Nagle	Australia	4 & 3	(United States) Julius Boros	
1970	Bide-A-Wee Golf Course	Sam Snead (3)	United States	3 & 2	(England) Max Faulkner	
1969	Bide-A-Wee Golf Course	Tommy Bolt	United States	39 holes	(Scotland) John Panton	
1968	Downfield Golf Club	Chandler Harper	United States	2 up	(England) Max Faulkner	
1967	Wallasey Golf Club	John Panton	Scotland	3 & 2	(United States) Sam Snead	
1966	Dalmahoy	Fred Haas	United States	3 & 2	(Wales) Dai Rees	
1965	Formby Golf Club	Sam Snead (2)	United States	37 holes	(England) Charlie Ward	
1964	Wentworth Club	Sam Snead	United States	7 & 6	(England) Syd Scott	
1963	St Annes Old Links	Herman Barron	United States	3 & 2	(England) George Evans	
1962	Prestwick Golf Club	Paul Runyan (2)	United States	2 & 1	(England) Sam King	
1961	Fairhaven Golf Club	Paul Runyan	United States	3 & 1	(England) Sam King	
1960	Gleneagles Hotel	Dick Metz	United States	2 & 1	(England) Reg Horne	
1959	Bruntsfield Links	Willie Goggin	United States	5 & 3	(England) Arthur Lees	
1958	Wallasey Golf Club	Norman Sutton	England	2 & 1	(United States) Gene Sarazen	
1957	Pollok Golf Club	Al Watrous	United States	8 & 6	(England) John Burton	
1956	Prenton Golf Club	Bob Kenyon	England	4 & 3	(United States) Pete Burke	
1955	Williamwood Golf Club	Mortie Dutra	United States	2 up	(England) John Burton	
1954	Southport & Ainsdale GC	Gene Sarazen	United States	4 & 3	(England) Percy Alliss	
