= Bob Kenyon =

English golfer

Personal information
- Full name: Ernest William Henry Kenyon
- Nationality: England
- Born: 16 March 1905 Exmouth, Devon, England
- Died: 15 March 1988 (aged 82) Letchworth, Hertfordshire, England

Career
- Sport: Golf
- Status: Professional
- Professional wins: 4

Best results in major championships
- Masters Tournament: DNP
- PGA Championship: DNP
- U.S. Open: DNP
- The Open Championship: T9: 1939

Ernest William Henry "Bob" Kenyon (16 March 1905 – 15 March 1988) was an English professional golfer. He won the Irish Open in 1931 and 1933 and finished tied for ninth place in the 1939 Open Championship. He won the World Senior Championship in 1956.

== Early life ==
Kenyon, who was born in Exmouth, Devon, England on 16 March 1905, was the son of Ernest Kenyon (1879–1958), the professional at Exmouth Golf Club from 1903 to 1938.

== Golf career ==
Kenyon was at Whitchurch Golf Club and Creigiau Golf Club in Wales and was then professional at West Lancashire Golf Club from late 1929 to 1935 where he was replaced by Ted Jarman. In 1936 Kenyon moved to Beaconsfield Golf Club, replacing Percy Alliss. After World War II, he joined Worsley Golf Club and, from 1956, Letchworth Golf Club.

=== Irish Open ===
He won the Irish Open in 1931 and again in 1933.

=== 1939 Open Championship ===
The 1939 Open Championship was held 5–7 July at the Old Course at St Andrews in St Andrews, Scotland. Kenyon played solid, consistent golf and carded rounds of 73-75-74-74=296 finishing +4 for the tournament. He tied with Bobby Locke and Percy Alliss for ninth place and won £11 13s 4d.

=== World Senior Championship ===
Kenyon won the World Senior Championship in 1956. He played at Prenton Golf Club against the Pete Burke who had won the American PGA Seniors' Championship, winning the 36-hole match 4 & 3. From 1957 the British representative in this match was given to the winner of the British PGA Seniors Championship but in 1956 four leading senior golfers played to decide the British entry.

== Death and legacy ==
Kenyon died on 15 March 1988 in Letchworth, Hertfordshire, England. He is remembered for twice winning the Irish Open.

== Tournament wins (4) ==
- 1931 Irish Open
- 1932 Leeds Cup
- 1933 Irish Open
- 1956 World Senior Championship

== Results in major championships ==
| Tournament | 1928 | 1929 |
|---|---|---|
| The Open Championship | T47 | |

| Tournament | 1930 | 1931 | 1932 | 1933 | 1934 | 1935 | 1936 | 1937 | 1938 | 1939 |
|---|---|---|---|---|---|---|---|---|---|---|
| The Open Championship | T48 | T29 | T22 | T44 | | T12 | | | T28 | T9 |

| Tournament | 1940 | 1941 | 1942 | 1943 | 1944 | 1945 | 1946 | 1947 | 1948 | 1949 |
|---|---|---|---|---|---|---|---|---|---|---|
| The Open Championship | NT | NT | NT | NT | NT | NT | CUT | | | 29 |

| Tournament | 1950 | 1951 | 1952 | 1953 | 1954 | 1955 |
|---|---|---|---|---|---|---|
| The Open Championship | CUT | | | | | CUT |

Note: Kenyon only played in The Open Championship.

Top 10
Did not play

NT = No tournament
CUT = missed the half-way cut
"T" indicates a tie for a place

== Team appearances ==
- England–Scotland Professional Match (representing England): 1932 (winners)
- England–Ireland Professional Match (representing England): 1932 (winners)
