= England–Ireland Professional Match =

Annual golf competition held in 1932 and 1933

Tournament information
- Established: 1932
- Format: Team match play
- Month played: July/August
- Final year: 1933

Final champion
- England

The England–Ireland Professional Match was an annual men's professional golf competition between teams representing England and Ireland. It was played in 1932 and 1933 before the Irish Open. The matches followed the same form as the England–Scotland Professional Match that had been played just before the Open Championship. The match was played on a single day with 12 players in each team who played 6 foursomes and 12 singles matches. England won the first match 16–2 and the second match 13–3 after which the match was discontinued. The teams met again in 1938 as part of the Llandudno International Golf Trophy.

== Results ==
Year	Date	Venue	Winners	Score	Ref
1932	22 August	Cork Golf Club, Irish Free State	England	16–2	
1933	25 July	Malone Golf Club, Northern Ireland	England	13–3	

== Appearances ==
The following are those who played in at least one of the two matches. Bert Hodson played for Wales in the 1937 Triangular Professional Tournament and the 1938 Llandudno International Golf Trophy. Sydney Fairweather played for Scotland in the England–Scotland Professional Match in 1933, 1935, 1936 and in the Llandudno International Golf Trophy in 1938.

=== England ===
- Percy Alliss 1932
- Tom Barber 1932, 1933
- John Burton 1933
- Archie Compston 1932
- Bill Davies 1932, 1933
- Syd Easterbrook 1933
- Bert Gadd 1933
- Arthur Havers 1932, 1933
- Bert Hodson 1933
- Bob Kenyon 1932
- Arthur Lacey 1932, 1933
- Alf Padgham 1932, 1933
- Alf Perry 1932
- Mark Seymour 1932, 1933
- Bill Twine 1932
- Charlie Ward 1932
- Charles Whitcombe 1933
- Ernest Whitcombe 1933

=== Ireland ===
- Denis Cassidy 1933
- Sydney Fairweather 1932
- John Hamill 1932, 1933
- Willie Holley 1932, 1933
- Paddy Mahon 1932, 1933
- Hugh McNeill 1932
- Joe McCartney 1932, 1933
- Matt McDermott 1932
- John McKenna 1933
- Willie Nolan 1932, 1933
- Pat O'Connor 1932, 1933
- Jack O'Neill 1933
- Moses O'Neill 1933
- Ernie Patterson 1932, 1933
- Charlie Pope 1932
- Philip Stevenson 1933
- Leo Wallace 1932
