= Nick Dougherty =

English professional golfer (born 1982)

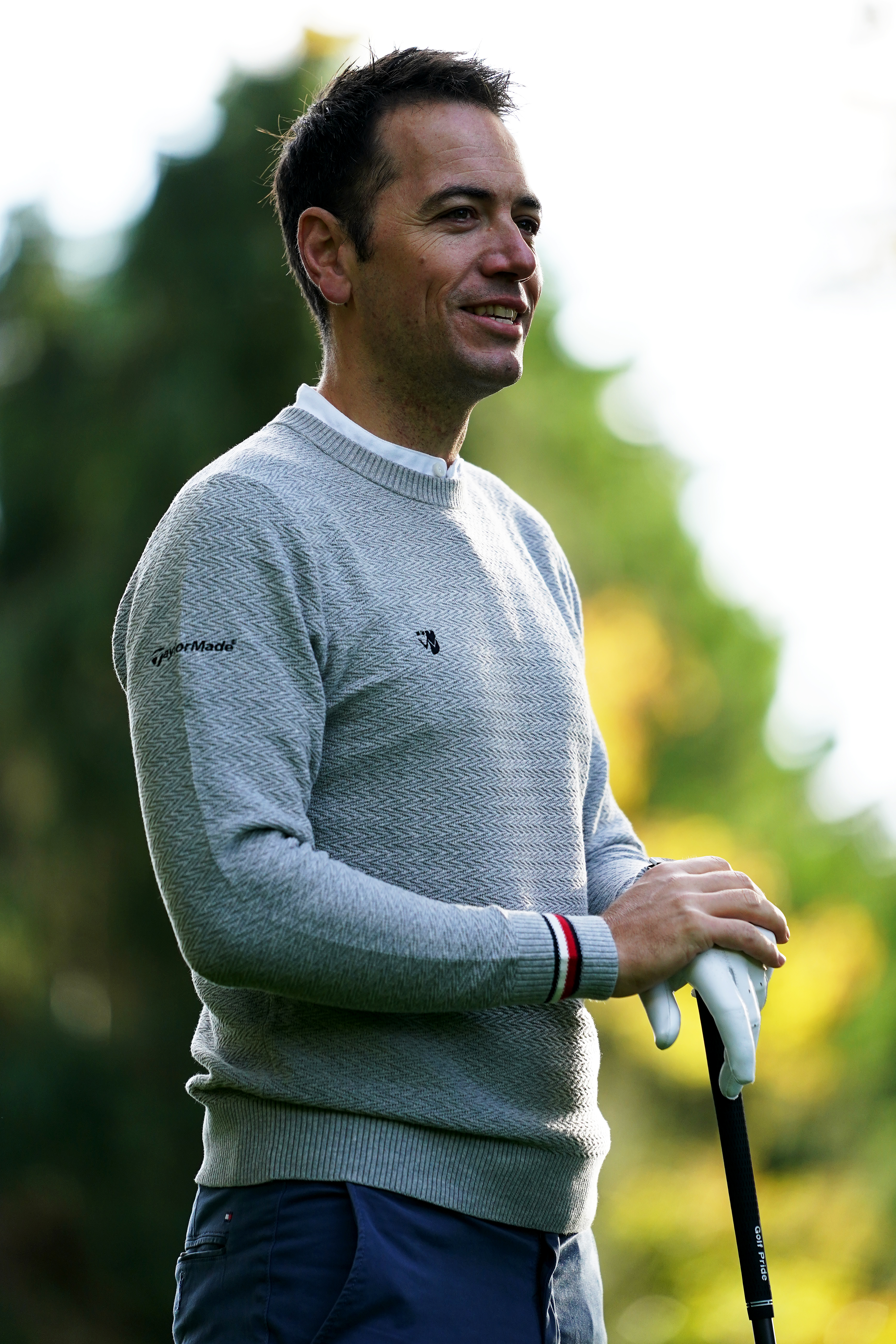
- Dougherty in 2020

Personal information
- Full name: Nicholas James Dougherty
- Nationality: England
- Born: 24 May 1982 (age 44) Bootle, Liverpool, England
- Height: 6 ft 0 in (1.83 m)
- Spouses: Di Stewart (m. 2010; div. 2023) Selena Oliver (m. 2025)
- Children: 2

Career
- Sport: Golf
- Turned professional: 2001
- Former tours: European Tour; Challenge Tour
- Professional wins: 3
- Highest ranking: 46 (17 February 2008)

Number of wins by tour
- European Tour: 3
- Asian Tour: 1

Best results in major championships
- Masters Tournament: T33: 2008
- PGA Championship: CUT: 2005, 2006, 2007, 2008, 2009
- U.S. Open: T7: 2007
- The Open Championship: T38: 2009

Achievements and awards
- Sir Henry Cotton Rookie of the Year: 2002

Nicholas James Dougherty (born 24 May 1982) is an English former professional golfer and broadcaster.

Dougherty started his career by winning the 1999 World Boys Championship and three Faldo Junior Series events. He soon after began a professional golf career, becoming a member of the European Tour in 2002, and scoring his first victory in 2005, and his second victory in 2007. Dougherty lost his European Tour membership in 2011 though joined the Challenger Tour in 2013. Since 2019, he has retired golf and is a Sky Sports Golf presenter.

== Early life and amateur career ==
Dougherty was born in Bootle, Merseyside, and attended Queen Elizabeth's Grammar School in Blackburn, Lancashire.

Dougherty is a protégé of former professional golfer, Nick Faldo, and had an exceptional amateur career. He won numerous tournaments including the 1999 World Boys Championship and three Faldo Junior Series events. In 2001, he was a member of the victorious Great Britain and Ireland Walker Cup team.

== Professional career ==
In 2001, Dougherty turned professional. He gained membership to the European Tour for 2002 via the final qualifying school. In his début season he finished 36th on the Order of Merit, and was named the Sir Henry Cotton Rookie of the Year. He was hindered by glandular fever in 2003, and his 2004 season was also disappointing when he slipped to 97th on the Order of Merit. In early 2005 he earned his first victory on the European Tour at the Caltex Masters in Singapore, going on to reach the top 100 of the Official World Golf Rankings in the middle of the year, and ended it in 15th place on the final European Tour Order of Merit. He also made a strong start to the 2006 season before struggling later in the year.

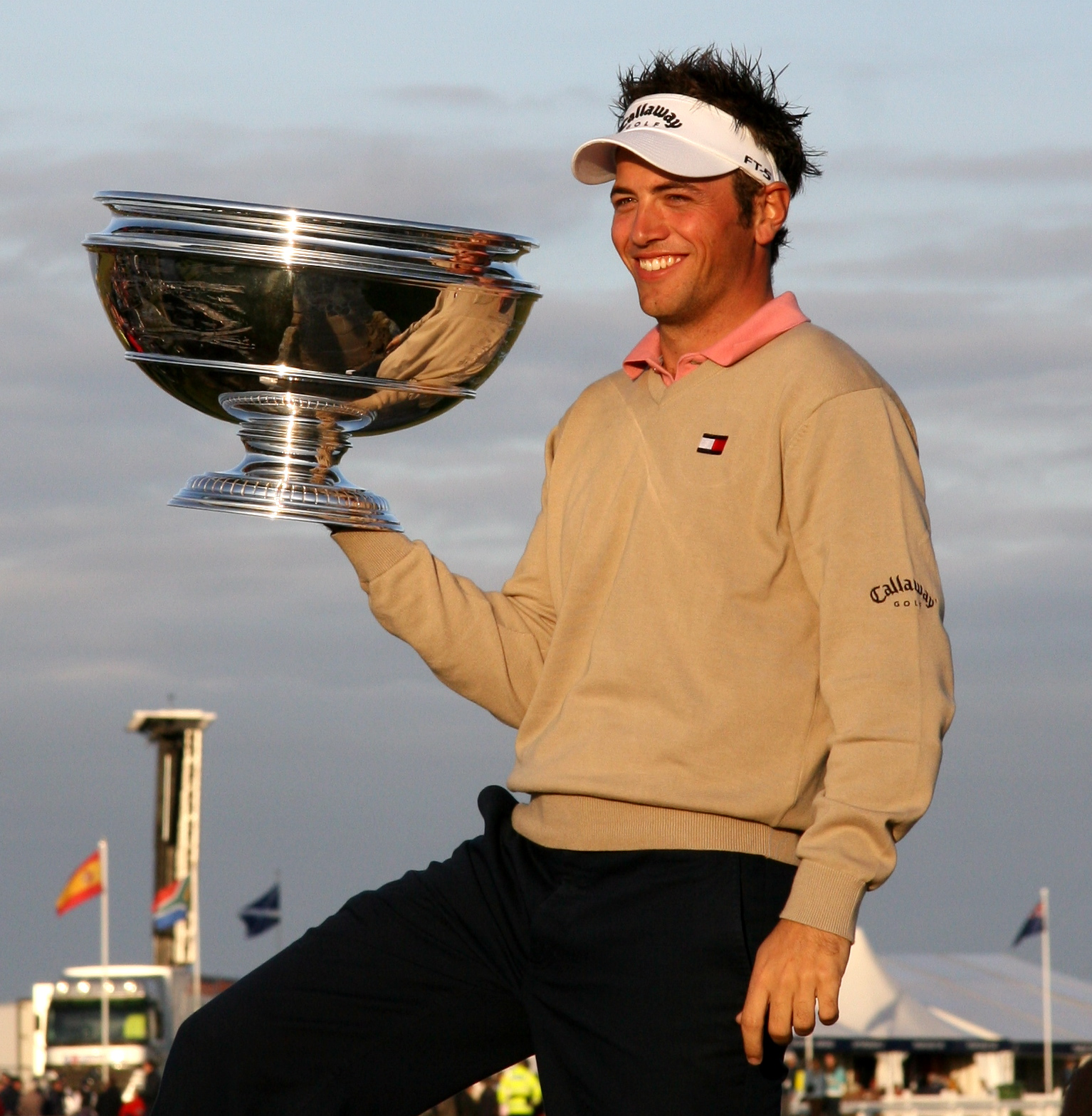
Nick Dougherty after winning the 2007 Alfred Dunhill Links Championship

Dougherty would bounce back in 2007, and was the leader after the first round of the 107th US Open at Oakmont Country Club with a two-under-par round of 68. He eventually finished the tournament in a tie for seventh place. This is, to date, his best finish in a major championship, and was also enough to gain automatic entry into the following year's championship and the US Masters. Later that year he secured his second European Tour victory at the Alfred Dunhill Links Championship, and finished the season placed 11th on the Order of Merit.

After a disappointing 2008 season which was marred by the sudden death of his mother, Dougherty recorded his third European Tour victory at the 2009 BMW International Open in Munich, Germany. He was three shots behind 54-hole leader Retief Goosen going into the final round. He shot a final round of 64 and ended with a one stroke victory over Rafael Echenique, who made an albatross 2 on the par-5 18th, and by four over Goosen. The win secured Dougherty a spot in his first major of 2009, The Open Championship at Turnberry in July.

Dougherty ended up losing his European Tour card in 2011 after making only one cut during 32 events. Although he finished 45th at the Omega European Masters with a first day 63 helping him to prize money of 10,600 euros, it was not enough to retain his 2012 tour card. He attended the European Qualifying School in late 2011, but was unsuccessful and consequently settled for membership on the Challenge Tour. At the end of 2013 he found himself at Q school on the Challenge Tour where he stated he was much happier with his game than he had been for a while, but success continued to elude him. Dougherty has not played a European Tour-sanctioned event since 2016.

After his retirement from playing Dougherty moved into the media with a position at Sky Sports Golf as a presenter. Since 2019, Dougherty has been the Sky Sports golf lead presenter for all men's majors and the Ryder Cup.

== Awards and honors ==
In 2002, Dougherty earned the European Tour's Sir Henry Cotton Rookie of the Year award.

== Amateur wins ==
- 1997 Faldo Junior Series, Golf Foundation Player of the Year
- 1999 Faldo Junior Series, European Under 21 Championship, World Boys Championship, Polo Classic Under 19 Championship (United States)
- 2000 Faldo Junior Series, Polo Golf Classic Stroke Play Championship (United States), Guatemalan Amateur Open Championship
- 2001 Lake Macquarie Amateur

== Professional wins (3) ==
=== European Tour wins (3) ===
No.	Date	Tournament	Winning score	Margin of victory	Runner(s)-up
1	30 Jan 2005	Caltex Masters^{1}	−18 (68-67-68-67=270)	5 strokes	(Netherlands) Maarten Lafeber, (Scotland) Colin Montgomerie
2	7 Oct 2007	Alfred Dunhill Links Championship	−18 (67-66-66-71=270)	2 strokes	(England) Justin Rose
3	28 Jun 2009	BMW International Open	−22 (69-65-68-64=266)	1 stroke	(Argentina) Rafael Echenique

^{1}Co-sanctioned by the Asian Tour

== Results in major championships ==
Tournament	2005	2006	2007	2008	2009
Masters Tournament				T33	
U.S. Open	T52	CUT	T7	CUT	
The Open Championship		CUT	T42	T78	T38
PGA Championship	CUT	CUT	CUT	CUT	CUT

Top 10
Did not play

CUT = missed the half-way cut
"T" = tied

=== Summary ===
Tournament	Wins	2nd	3rd	Top-5	Top-10	Top-25	Events	Cuts made
Masters Tournament	0	0	0	0	0	0	1	1
U.S. Open	0	0	0	0	1	1	4	2
The Open Championship	0	0	0	0	0	0	4	3
PGA Championship	0	0	0	0	0	0	5	0
Totals	0	0	0	0	1	1	14	6

- Most consecutive cuts made – 2 (2007 U.S. Open – 2007 Open Championship)
- Longest streak of top-10s – 1

== Results in World Golf Championships ==
Tournament	2005	2006	2007	2008	2009
Match Play				R64	
Championship	T51			T51	
Invitational	T51			T61	T51
Champions					T74

Note that the HSBC Champions did not become a WGC event until 2009.

Did not play

QF, R16, R32, R64 = Round in which player lost in match play
' "T" = tied

== Team appearances ==
Amateur

- European Boys' Team Championship (representing England): 1998, 1999 (winners), 2000
- European Amateur Team Championship (representing England): 2001
- Walker Cup (representing Great Britain & Ireland): 2001 (winners)
- St Andrews Trophy (representing Great Britain & Ireland): 2000 (winners)
- Jacques Léglise Trophy (representing Great Britain & Ireland): 1998 (winners), 1999 (winners)
- World Boys: 1998 (winners), 1999 (winners)

Professional

- Seve Trophy (representing Great Britain & Ireland): 2005 (winners), 2007 (winners), 2009 (winners)
- Royal Trophy (representing Europe): 2009
