= Killarney Golf & Fishing Club =

- Location in Ireland
- 52.060459°N 9.563379°W

Club information
- Location: Killarney, County Kerry, Ireland
- Established: 1893, 133 years ago
- Type: Private
- Total holes: 18
- Tournaments: Irish Open (1991–92, 2010–11); Curtis Cup (1996)
- Website: killarneygolfclub.ie

Killeen
- Par: 72
- Length: 7,252 yards (6,631 m)
- Course record: David Feherty (65, 1991)

Killarney Golf and Fishing Club is a golfing venue located in Killarney National Park, in Killarney, Ireland. It has hosted the Irish Open on six separate occasions and is home to two 18-hole Championship Courses and The Killarney Golf Academy which encompasses a 9 Hole Academy Course, a Driving Range and extensive practice facilities.

It is a private - members owned golf club on the shore of Lough Leane just west of Killarney, County Kerry, Ireland. The club has two 18-hole golf courses, Killeen and Mahony's Point & a 9-Hole Course called Lackabane. It also has full practice facilities including covered driving bays, pitch, chipping & putting Greens The Killeen Course measures 7,031 yards and plays to a par of 72. It has been the venue for the European Tour's Irish Open in 1991, 1992, 2010 and 2011 and the Curtis Cup in 1996.
