= Maarten Lafeber =

Dutch professional golfer (born 1974)

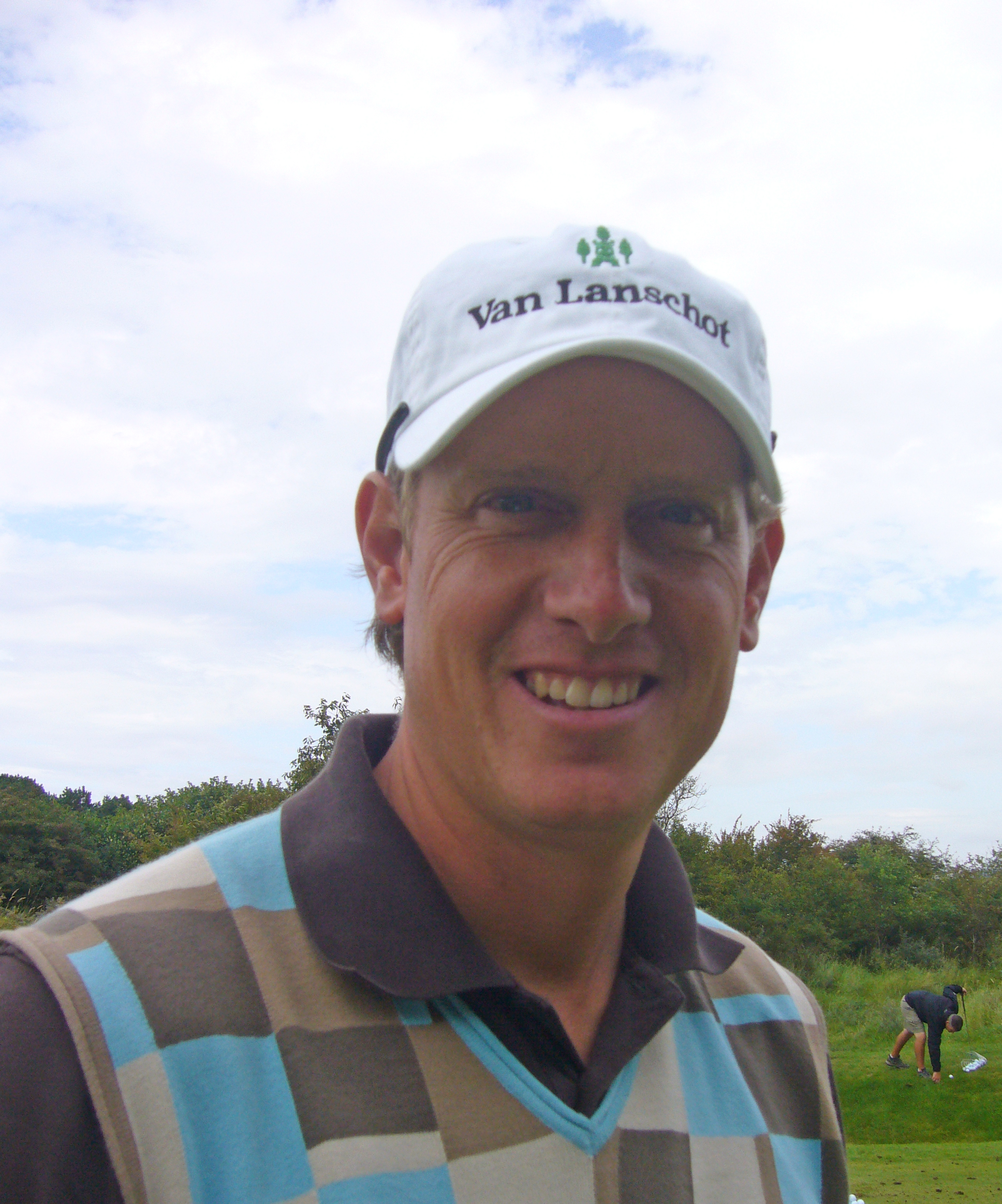

Personal information
- Nationality: Netherlands
- Born: 11 December 1974 (age 51) Eindhoven, Netherlands
- Height: 6 ft 3 in (1.91 m)
- Weight: 166 lb (75 kg; 11.9 st)

Career
- Sport: Golf
- Turned professional: 1997
- Former tours: European Tour; Challenge Tour
- Professional wins: 2
- Highest ranking: 88 (17 July 2005)

Number of wins by tour
- European Tour: 1
- Challenge Tour: 1

Best results in major championships
- Masters Tournament: DNP
- PGA Championship: CUT: 2005
- U.S. Open: CUT: 2003, 2006, 2011
- The Open Championship: T41: 2005

Maarten Lafeber (born 11 December 1974) is a Dutch professional golfer.

== Early life and amateur career ==
Lafeber was born in Eindhoven, North Brabant. He won the Dutch, Swiss and Spanish amateur championships in his youth.

== Professional career ==
Lafeber turned professional in 1997. He earned a European Tour card at the first attempt but lost it at the end of 1998.

Lafeber played on the second-tier Challenge Tour where he won the 1999 Tusker Kenya Open. He regained his place on the main tour for the 2000 season. In 2003, he became the first home player to win the Dutch Open since Joop Rühl 1947, and that remains his only win on the European Tour. In July 2005, he reached a career high ranking of 88 in the World Golf Ranking.

Lafeber once sold shares in himself to Dutch businessmen to help finance his career.

== Personal life ==
In June 2025, Lafeber's son Guus made his debut appearance at the KLM Open as an amateur, where Maarten acted as his caddy. Later in August 2025, Guus went on to win the Boys Amateur Championship at County Louth Golf Club in Ireland.

== Amateur wins ==
- 1995 Dutch Amateur Stroke Play Championship
- 1997 Dutch Amateur Championship, Spanish Amateur Open Championship, Swiss Amateur Open Championship

== Professional wins (2) ==
=== European Tour wins (1) ===
| No. | Date | Tournament | Winning score | Margin of victory | Runners-up |
|---|---|---|---|---|---|
| 1 | 12 Oct 2003 | Dutch Open | −13 (67-69-64-67=267) | 1 stroke | (Sweden) Mathias Grönberg, (Denmark) Søren Hansen |

=== Challenge Tour wins (1) ===
| No. | Date | Tournament | Winning score | Margin of victory | Runner-up |
|---|---|---|---|---|---|
| 1 | 14 Mar 1999 | Tusker Kenya Open | −19 (66-66-69-64=265) | 3 strokes | (Sweden) Erik Andersson |

== Results in major championships ==
| Tournament | 2000 | 2001 | 2002 | 2003 | 2004 | 2005 | 2006 | 2007 | 2008 | 2009 |
|---|---|---|---|---|---|---|---|---|---|---|
| U.S. Open | | | | CUT | | | CUT | | | |
| The Open Championship | CUT | | | | CUT | T41 | | | | |
| PGA Championship | | | | | | CUT | | | | |

| Tournament | 2010 | 2011 |
|---|---|---|
| U.S. Open | | CUT |
| The Open Championship | | |
| PGA Championship | | |

Note: Lafeber never played in the Masters Tournament.

Did not play

CUT = missed the half-way cut
"T" = tied

== Team appearances ==
Amateur

- European Amateur Team Championship (representing the Netherlands): 1993, 1995, 1997
- European Youths' Team Championship (representing the Netherlands): 1994
- Eisenhower Trophy (representing the Netherlands): 1994, 1996
- St Andrews Trophy (representing the Continent of Europe): 1996

Professional

- World Cup (representing the Netherlands): 1999, 2001, 2004, 2005, 2007
- Seve Trophy (representing Continental Europe): 2005

== See also ==
- 2011 European Tour Qualifying School graduates
