= Ballyliffin Golf Club =

Golf club in County Donegal, Ireland

- Location in Ireland
- 55.292612°N 7.373285°W

Club information
- Location: Ballyliffin, County Donegal, Ireland
- Established: 1947, 79 years ago
- Type: Private
- Tota holes: 36
- Tournaments: Dubai Duty Free Irish Open (2018); North West of Ireland Open (2002)
- Website: ballyliffingolfclub.com

The Glashedy Links
- Designed by: Pat Ruddy, Tom Craddock
- Par: 72
- Length: 7,423 yards (6,788 m)
- Course record: 65: Jorge Campillo (2018); Andy Sullivan (2018); Erik van Rooyen (2018)

The Old Links
- Designed by: Nick Faldo
- Par: 71
- Length: 6,937 yards (6,343 m)
- Course record: 64: Hugh O'Neill

Ballyliffin Golf Club (Irish: Cumann Gailf Bhaile Lifín) is a golf club located in Ballyliffin, County Donegal, Ireland.

== History ==
The club was founded in 1947.

It hosted the 1998 Ladies Irish Open.

It hosted the Irish Open in 2018.

It hosted The Amateur Championship in 2024.

=== Course record ===
The course record was 67, set by Jean-François Lucquin in 2002, before Rory McIlroy shot a 66 in 2006. The course record was eventually broken again in the 2018 Irish Open when Erik van Rooyen, Andy Sullivan and Jorge Campillo all carded rounds of 65 to share the honour of owning the course record on the Glashedy Links.

== Scorecards ==
Glashedy Links – Championship tees

Hole	Name	Yards	Par	Hole	Name	Yards	Par
1	Creig a'Bhainne	422	4	10	Stúca Buí	394	4
2	Creig na Caillighe	458	4	11	Carriag a'Bracaigh	418	4
3	Ligean	426	4	12	Odhran	441	4
4	Glas Éide	585	5	13	Bun a'Chnoic	571	5
5	Clochán Beag	172	3	14	Camus	182	3
6	Doras Mór	406	4	15	Tobar Mhuiris	451	4
7	Loch na nDeor	171	3	16	Creig na Sí	436	4
8	Scaithán	424	4	17	Paírc na mBó	562	5
9	Bárr na Gaoithe	452	4	18	Gort na Móna	452	4
Out		3,516	35	In		3,907	37
				Total		7,423	72

Old Links – Championship tees

Hole	Name	Yards	Par	Hole	Name	Yards	Par
1	The Mounds	397	4	10	The Castles	341	4
2	Road to the Isle	428	4	11	Cruachan	392	4
3	Glashedy	383	4	12	The Dell	217	3
4	Lagan	558	5	13	Banba's Crown	454	4
5	The Tank	179	3	14	Bulbin	565	5
6	Aughrim	376	4	15	Ardascanlan	480	4
7	Ardagh	185	3	16	The Valley	439	4
8	O'Kane's	382	4	17	The Hump	172	3
9	The Tochar	403	4	18	Callaghan's Straid	586	5
Out		3,291	35	In		3,646	36
				Total		6,937	71

== See also ==
- Royal Portrush Golf Club
- Portstewart Golf Club
