= Irish Open (golf) =

Golf tournament

Coordinates: 53.307°N 6.625°W

Amgen Irish Open
Tournament information
- Location: Doonbeg, Ireland
- Established: 1927
- Course: Trump International Golf Links & Hotel Ireland, Doonbeg
- Par: 70
- Length: 6,838 yards (6,253 m)
- Tour: European Tour
- Format: Stroke play
- Prize fund: US$6,000,000
- Month played: September

Tournament record score
- Aggregate: 257 Shane Lowry (2026)
- To par: −24 Jon Rahm (2017)

Current champion
- (Republic of Ireland) Shane Lowry

Location map
- Location in Ireland

The Irish Open, currently titled as the Amgen Irish Open for sponsorship reasons, is a professional golf tournament on the European Tour. The Irish Open was first played in 1927 and was played annually, except for the war years, until 1950. There was a tournament in 1953, but the event was then not played again until revived in 1975. It has been contested annually since then. From 1963 to 1974 Carroll's sponsored a tournament, generally called the Carroll's International and in 1975 they became the sponsor of the Irish Open which became known as the Carroll's Irish Open.

== History ==
The first Irish Open in 1927 was played at Portmarnock Golf Club from 16 to 18 August. There were 18 holes played on the first two days with the leading 60 players and ties playing a further 36 holes on the final day. In a stiff breeze local professional Willie Nolan led after the first day with a course record 72. On the second day Nolan faded after an 83 and the lead was taken by Henry Cotton on 146 with Jack Smith a shot behind. The cut was 165 and exactly 60 players qualified, including 6 amateurs. Conditions were very poor on the final day with the refreshment and press tents blown down and rain falling in torrents. Jack Smith had an excellent 77 in the morning and with Henry Cotton taking 86, Smith had an eight-shot lead over Cotton and Archie Compston. Smith, however, went to pieces and had a final round of 91 and was overtaken by Cotton, who took 81. George Duncan, starting the final round 14 shots behind, scored 74 and finished with a total of 312, beating Smith by three and Cotton by one. Duncan's score of 74 was remarkable in that it was only two strokes over the new course record, on a day when his 74 and Smith's 77 in the morning were the only two rounds under 80 on the final day. Duncan took the Championship Gold Medal and the first prize of £150. Nolan was the leading Irishman, finishing fifth.

After Duncan's win in 1927, the event was dominated by English golfers, the only other non-English winner before World War II being Bobby Locke in 1938. Ernest Whitcombe won in 1928, the first of four wins by the Whitcombe brothers; Ernest won again in 1935 while Charles won in 1930 and Reg won in 1936. Ernest Whitcombe had rounds of 68 and 69 on the first two days of the 1928 event, to take a seven stroke lead. Rounds of 73 and 78 on the final day were enough to give him a four stroke victory. The 1929 championship was played again at Portmarnock and resulted in a three-way tie on 309, just 3 strokes better than Duncan's score there in 1927. There was a 36-hole playoff the following day. Abe Mitchell and Archie Compston were level after the first round on 75 with Len Holland five behind. Mitchell scored another 75 in the afternoon to win by two strokes from Compston and ten from Holland. Charles Whitcombe dominated the 1930 tournament, winning by 8 strokes from defending champion Abe Mitchell. Whitcombe led by four after the first two rounds and full away further on the final day. the 1931 championship was won by a relative unknown, Bob Kenyon, who won by two after a final round 70. Five players tied for second place, including Ernest Whitcombe who finished with a course-record 66 on the Royal Dublin links.

Alf Padgham won in 1932 with steady rounds of 71-71-71-70, one ahead of Bill Davies. Bob Kenyon won for the second time in 1933. Defending champion Padgham had led after two rounds but had a disappointing third round 76 and finished runner-up, two behind. Syd Easterbrook won at Portmarnock in 1934 with a total of 284, 25 better than the winning score there in 1929, to win by 7 strokes from the Irish amateur, Joe Brown, who.recorded the best finish by an Irish golfer at that time. Two of the Whitcombe brothers, Ernest and Reg, tied in 1935. Bob Kenyon had a good chance to win for the third time but had 5s at the last two holes to finish a shot behind. In the playoff Reg had a bad start, taking 7 at the first hole. He recovered to be level early in the second round but had another 7 and Ernest eventually won by three strokes.

In 1932 and 1933, the Irish Open was preceded by an international match between teams of English and Irish professionals. England won the first match 16–2 and the second match 13–3 with two halves. The matches followed the same form as the England–Scotland Professional Match that had been played just before the Open Championship.

After his playoff loss in 1935, Reg Whitcombe won in 1936, two ahead of Bill Davies who was a runner-up for the third time. Whitcombe had final day rounds of 68 and 69 for a record low total of 281. Jimmy Adams seemed the likely winner at Royal Portrush in 1937 after finishing on 285. However Bert Gadd finished with two 3s (eagle-birdie) to win by a shot. 20-year-old Bobby Locke, who had recently turned professional, broke the run of English winners in 1938. Henry Cotton had seemed the likely winner but finished 4-5-5-5 while Locke finished 2-4-4-4 and finished a stroke behind. Arthur Lees won in 1939 with a total 287 with Reg Whitcombe two behind. 19-year-old Irish amateur Jimmy Bruen led after two rounds but scored 75 and 81 on the final day to drop into 6th place, leading amateur for the third successive year.

When the event resumed at Portmarnock in 1946, Fred Daly became the first Irish winner. The tournament turned in a contest between Daly and Bobby Locke, Daly eventually winning by 4 strokes. No one else was within 10 shots of Daly. There was a second Irish winner at Royal Portrush in 1947 when Harry Bradshaw won the title, two ahead of Flory Van Donck. Max Faulkner led after three rounds but a final round 76 dropped him down to third place. Dai Rees won in 1948, his total of 295 being two better than Norman Von Nida. Faulkner again led after three round but a 77 left him tied for third place. Bradshaw won for a second time at Belvoir Park in 1949. Bobby Locke came close to matching him but finished a stroke behind. The 1950 tournament was won by the Australian Ossie Pickworth, two ahead of John Panton and Norman Von Nida.

The event was not held in 1951 or 1952 but was held again in 1953 at Belvoir Park. Eric Brown won with a score of 272, a stroke ahead of Harry Weetman. 22-year-old Peter Alliss had taken an early clubhouse lead on 274 but was eventually beaten by Weetman and then Brown, finishing in third place. After 1953, the event was not played again until 1975; plans to revive the tournament in 1970 were abandoned after backers Pepsi pulled out.

Since 1963 Carroll's had sponsored a major tournament, the Carroll's International at Woodbrook Golf Club, which had been a European Tour event since the tour started in 1972. For the 1975 European Tour season the Carroll's International was dropped and Carroll's became the sponsor of the revived Irish Open, which took its place on the tour and was played at Woodbrook in the first year. Christy O'Connor Jnr became the third Irish winner, finishing one ahead of Harry Bannerman, and took the first prize of £5,000.

The Irish Open was one of the European Tour Rolex Series events form 2017–2020. The Rolex Series started in 2017, with each tournament in the series having a minimum prize fund of $7 million. During this period, the date was moved to early July, two weeks before The Open Championship. It is currently held in early September.

From 2014 to 2022 (except in 2016), it was one of the Open Qualifying Series with the leading three players who have not already qualified and who finish in the top ten, qualifying for The Open Championship.

== Venues ==
Locations of the venues on the island of Ireland

Venue	County	Province	First	Last	Times
Portmarnock	Dublin	Leinster	1927	2003	19
Royal County Down (Championship)	Down	Ulster	1928	2024	5
Royal Portrush (Dunluce)	Antrim	Ulster	1930	2012	4
Royal Dublin	Dublin	Leinster	1931	1985	6
Cork	Cork	Munster	1932	1932	1
Malone	Antrim	Ulster	1933	1933	1
Belvoir Park	Antrim	Ulster	1949	1953	2
Woodbrook	Wicklow	Leinster	1975	1975	1
Killarney (Killeen)	Kerry	Munster	1991	2011	4
Mount Juliet	Kilkenny	Leinster	1993	2022	5
Druids Glen (Glen)	Wicklow	Leinster	1996	1999	4
Ballybunion (Old)	Kerry	Munster	2000	2000	1
Fota Island Resort (Deerpark)	Cork	Munster	2001	2014	3
County Louth	Louth	Leinster	2004	2009	2
Carton House (Montgomerie)	Kildare	Leinster	2005	2013	3
Adare Manor	Limerick	Munster	2007	2008	2
K Club (Palmer North)	Kildare	Leinster	2016	2025	3
Portstewart (Strand)	Londonderry	Ulster	2017	2017	1
Ballyliffin (Glashedy)	Donegal	Ulster	2018	2018	1
Lahinch (Old)	Clare	Munster	2019	2019	1
Galgorm Castle	Antrim	Ulster	2020	2020	1
Doonbeg	Clare	Munster	2026	2026	1

- Connacht province has never hosted the event

=== Future venues ===
Year	Edition	Venue	County	Province	Dates
2027	72nd	K Club (Palmer North)	Kildare	Leinster	TBD

== Tournament notes ==
The Irish Open has been played at a variety of dates from mid-May to the end of August, but since the start of the Rolex series in 2017 it has been held in early July, two weeks before the Open Championship.

The tournament enjoys one of the largest galleries on the European Tour. In 2010, the Irish Open at Killarney Golf & Fishing Club had an attendance of 85,179 over four days, second only to the BMW PGA Championship. In 2011, Killarney Golf & Fishing Club tallied in excess of 86,500 over four days. This was again the second highest on the European Tour to the BMW PGA Championship. In 2012, Royal Portrush Golf Club had a record attendance of 112,000 over four days; 131,000 over the six days. This was the only time a European Tour event had sold out prior to play on all four days and was the highest attendance ever recorded on the European Tour.

Since 2008, it has been the only European Tour event played in Ireland. The European Open was held at the K Club in Straffan for thirteen years from 1995 to 2007 while the 2007 Seve Trophy and the 2006 Ryder Cup were the last important men's professional team competitions played in Ireland.

In April 2022 it was announced that The K Club had agreed a long-term deal with the European Tour, seeing them host the tournament in 2023, 2025 and 2027.

== Recent sponsorship ==
Following the departure of Nissan as title sponsor in 2006, Adare Golf Club, part of the Adare Manor Hotel and Golf Resort in County Limerick, had planned to host the tournament for three years, from 2007 to 2009. After two years, it was announced in January 2009 that they could no longer sustain the losses incurred by hosting the event for a third year. In early March, the European Tour confirmed the national championship would return to County Louth Golf Club, Baltray, which had last hosted in 2004, with a new sponsor, 3 Mobile.

Fáilte Ireland, the National Tourism Development Authority of the Republic of Ireland, agreed to sponsor in 2011, but with a reduced purse, cut in half to €1.5 million. In 2015 the event was sponsored by Dubai Duty Free in conjunction with the Rory Foundation. In October 2015, it was announced that Dubai Duty Free had extended their sponsorship to 2018 along with the Rory Foundation. In May 2018, it was announced that Dubai Duty Free would extend their sponsorship to 2022. In August 2021 it was announced that the prize money for the tournament would increase to €5 million from 2022.

In February 2022, it was announced that Horizon Therapeutics would become the new title sponsor in a six-year deal lasting until 2027. Due to Amgen's takeover of Horizon Therapeutics in October 2023, the 2024 edition of the tournament was renamed as the Amgen Irish Open.

== Winners ==
European Tour (Rolex Series)	2017–2019
European Tour (Regular)	1975–2016, 2020–
Pre-European Tour	1927–1953

#	Year	Winner	Score	To par	Margin of victory	Runner(s)-up	Winner's share (€)	Venue
Amgen Irish Open
71st	2026	(Republic of Ireland) Shane Lowry (2)	257	−23	11 strokes	(Chile) Joaquín Niemann (United States) Patrick Reed	878,529	Doonbeg
70th	2025	(Northern Ireland) Rory McIlroy (2)	271	−17	Playoff	(Sweden) Joakim Lagergren	873,464	K Club (Palmer North)
69th	2024	(Denmark) Rasmus Højgaard	275	−9	1 stroke	(Northern Ireland) Rory McIlroy	920,330	Royal County Down (Championship)
Horizon Irish Open
68th	2023	(Sweden) Vincent Norrman	274	−14	1 stroke	(Germany) Hurly Long	951,047	K Club (Palmer North)
67th	2022	(Poland) Adrian Meronk	268	−20	3 strokes	(New Zealand) Ryan Fox	974,606	Mount Juliet
Dubai Duty Free Irish Open
66th	2021	(Australia) Lucas Herbert	269	−19	3 strokes	(Sweden) Rikard Karlberg	484,990	Mount Juliet
65th (Note: The 2020 tournament was originally scheduled as a Rolex Series event but was downgraded as a result of rescheduling with a reduced prize fund due to the COVID-19 pandemic.)	2020	(United States) John Catlin	270	−10	2 strokes	(England) Aaron Rai	208,334	Galgorm Castle
64th	2019	(Spain) Jon Rahm (2)	264	−16	2 strokes	(England) Andy Sullivan (Austria) Bernd Wiesberger	1,034,478	Lahinch (Old)
63rd	2018	(Scotland) Russell Knox	274	−14	Playoff	(New Zealand) Ryan Fox	998,425	Ballyliffin (Glashedy)
62nd	2017	(Spain) Jon Rahm	264	−24	6 strokes	(Scotland) Richie Ramsay (England) Matthew Southgate	1,019,362	Portstewart (Strand)
61st	2016	(Northern Ireland) Rory McIlroy	276	−12	3 strokes	(Wales) Bradley Dredge (Scotland) Russell Knox	666,660	K Club (Palmer North)
60th	2015	(Denmark) Søren Kjeldsen	282	−2	Playoff	(England) Eddie Pepperell (Austria) Bernd Wiesberger	416,660	Royal County Down (Championship)
Irish Open
59th	2014	(Finland) Mikko Ilonen	271	−13	1 stroke	(Italy) Edoardo Molinari	333,330	Fota Island (Deerpark)
58th	2013	(England) Paul Casey	274	−14	3 strokes	(Netherlands) Joost Luiten (England) Robert Rock	333,330	Carton House (Montgomerie)
57th	2012	(Wales) Jamie Donaldson	270	−18	4 strokes	(Spain) Rafa Cabrera-Bello (England) Anthony Wall (Paraguay) Fabrizio Zanotti	333,330	Royal Portrush (Dunluce)
56th	2011	(England) Simon Dyson	269	−15	1 stroke	(Australia) Richard Green	250,000	Killarney (Killeen)
3 Irish Open
55th	2010	(England) Ross Fisher	266	−18	2 strokes	(Republic of Ireland) Pádraig Harrington	500,000	Killarney (Killeen)
54th	2009	(Republic of Ireland) Shane Lowry (a)	271	−17	Playoff	(England) Robert Rock	500,000 (Note: As Lowry was an amateur, he received no prize money. The winner's share was awarded to the leading professional, Robert Rock.)	County Louth
Irish Open
53rd	2008	(England) Richard Finch	278	−10	2 strokes	(Chile) Felipe Aguilar	416,600	Adare Manor
52nd	2007	(Republic of Ireland) Pádraig Harrington	283	−5	Playoff	(Wales) Bradley Dredge	416,600	Adare Manor
Nissan Irish Open
51st	2006	(Denmark) Thomas Bjørn	283	−5	1 stroke	(England) Paul Casey	366,660	Carton House (Montgomerie)
50th	2005	(Wales) Stephen Dodd	279	−9	Playoff	(England) David Howell	333,330	Carton House (Montgomerie)
49th	2004	(Australia) Brett Rumford	274	−14	4 strokes	(Republic of Ireland) Pádraig Harrington (France) Raphaël Jacquelin	316,660	County Louth
48th	2003	(New Zealand) Michael Campbell	277	−11	Playoff	(Denmark) Thomas Bjørn (Sweden) Peter Hedblom	300,000	Portmarnock
Murphy's Irish Open
47th	2002	(Denmark) Søren Hansen	270	−14	Playoff	(England) Richard Bland (Sweden) Niclas Fasth (South Africa) Darren Fichardt	266,600	Fota Island (Deerpark)
46th	2001	(Scotland) Colin Montgomerie (3)	266	−18	5 strokes	(Northern Ireland) Darren Clarke (Sweden) Niclas Fasth (Republic of Ireland) Pádraig Harrington	266,600	Fota Island (Deerpark)
45th	2000	(Sweden) Patrik Sjöland	270	−14	2 strokes	(Sweden) Freddie Jacobson	267,319	Ballybunion (Old)
44th	1999	(Spain) Sergio García	268	−16	3 strokes	(Argentina) Ángel Cabrera	233,320	Druids Glen (Glen)
43rd	1998	(England) David Carter	278	−6	Playoff	(Scotland) Colin Montgomerie	223,988	Druids Glen (Glen)
42nd	1997	(Scotland) Colin Montgomerie (2)	269	−15	7 strokes	(England) Lee Westwood	159,090	Druids Glen (Glen)
41st	1996	(Scotland) Colin Montgomerie	279	−5	1 stroke	(Scotland) Andrew Oldcorn (Australia) Wayne Riley	178,571	Druids Glen (Glen)
40th	1995	(Scotland) Sam Torrance (2)	277	−11	Playoff	(England) Stuart Cage (England) Howard Clark	155,550	Mount Juliet
39th	1994	(Germany) Bernhard Langer (3)	275	−13	1 stroke	(Australia) Robert Allenby (United States) John Daly	138,271	Mount Juliet
Carroll's Irish Open
38th	1993	(England) Nick Faldo (3)	276	−12	Playoff	(Spain) José María Olazábal	135,282	Mount Juliet
37th	1992	(England) Nick Faldo (2)	274	−14	Playoff	(South Africa) Wayne Westner	106,784	Killarney (Killeen)
36th	1991	(England) Nick Faldo	283	−5	3 strokes	(Scotland) Colin Montgomerie	85,344	Killarney (Killeen)
35th	1990	(Spain) José María Olazábal	282	−6	3 strokes	(United States) Mark Calcavecchia (New Zealand) Frank Nobilo	81,036	Portmarnock
34th	1989	(Wales) Ian Woosnam (2)	278	−10	Playoff	(Republic of Ireland) Philip Walton	61,296	Portmarnock
33rd	1988	(Wales) Ian Woosnam	278	−10	7 strokes	(England) Nick Faldo (Spain) José María Olazábal (Spain) Manuel Piñero (Republic of Ireland) Des Smyth	54,166	Portmarnock
32nd	1987	(West Germany) Bernhard Langer (2)	269	−19	10 strokes	(Scotland) Sandy Lyle	50,174	Portmarnock
31st	1986	(Spain) Seve Ballesteros (3)	285	−3	2 strokes	(Australia) Rodger Davis (Zimbabwe) Mark McNulty	44,380	Portmarnock
30th	1985	(Spain) Seve Ballesteros (2)	278	−10	Playoff	(West Germany) Bernhard Langer	28,000	Royal Dublin
29th	1984	(West Germany) Bernhard Langer	267	−21	4 strokes	(England) Mark James	25,662	Royal Dublin
28th	1983	(Spain) Seve Ballesteros	271	−17	2 strokes	(Scotland) Brian Barnes	25,662	Royal Dublin
27th	1982	(Republic of Ireland) John O'Leary	287	−1	1 stroke	(England) Maurice Bembridge	18,742	Portmarnock
26th	1981	(Scotland) Sam Torrance	276	−12	5 strokes	(England) Nick Faldo	18,659	Portmarnock
25th	1980	(England) Mark James (2)	284	−4	1 stroke	(Scotland) Brian Barnes	16,730	Portmarnock
24th	1979	(England) Mark James	282	−6	1 stroke	(United States) Ed Sneed	14,000	Portmarnock
23rd	1978	(Scotland) Ken Brown	281	−7	1 stroke	(Spain) Seve Ballesteros (Republic of Ireland) John O'Leary	14,000	Portmarnock
22nd	1977	(United States) Hubert Green	283	−5	1 stroke	(United States) Ben Crenshaw	11,200	Portmarnock
21st	1976	(United States) Ben Crenshaw	284	−4	2 strokes	(Scotland) Brian Barnes (United States) Billy Casper (England) Martin Foster	9,800	Portmarnock
20th	1975	(Republic of Ireland) Christy O'Connor Jnr	275	−21	1 stroke	(Scotland) Harry Bannerman	7,000	Woodbrook
Irish Open
1954–1974: No tournament
19th	1953	(Scotland) Eric Brown	272		1 stroke	(England) Harry Weetman	700	Belvoir Park
1951–52: No tournament
18th	1950	(Australia) Ossie Pickworth	287		2 strokes	(Scotland) John Panton (Australia) Norman Von Nida	400	Royal Dublin
17th	1949	(Republic of Ireland) Harry Bradshaw (2)	286		1 stroke	(South Africa) Bobby Locke	400	Belvoir Park
16th	1948	(Wales) Dai Rees	295		2 strokes	(Australia) Norman Von Nida	400	Portmarnock
15th	1947	(Republic of Ireland) Harry Bradshaw	290		2 strokes	(Belgium) Flory Van Donck		Royal Portrush
14th	1946	(Northern Ireland) Fred Daly	288		4 strokes	(South Africa) Bobby Locke		Portmarnock
1940–1945: No tournament due to World War II
13th	1939	(England) Arthur Lees	287		2 strokes	(England) Reg Whitcombe		Royal County Down (Championship)
12th	1938	(South Africa) Bobby Locke	292		1 stroke	(England) Henry Cotton	150	Portmarnock
11th	1937	(England) Bert Gadd	284		1 stroke	(Scotland) Jimmy Adams		Royal Portrush (Dunluce)
10th	1936	(England) Reg Whitcombe	281		2 strokes	(England) Bill Davies		Royal Dublin
9th	1935	(England) Ernest Whitcombe (2)	292		Playoff	(England) Reg Whitcombe		Royal County Down (Championship)
8th	1934	(England) Syd Easterbrook	284		7 strokes	(Republic of Ireland) Joe Brown (a)		Portmarnock
7th	1933	(England) Bob Kenyon (2)	286		2 strokes	(England) Alf Padgham		Malone
6th	1932	(England) Alf Padgham	283		1 stroke	(England) Bill Davies		Cork
5th	1931	(England) Bob Kenyon	291		2 strokes	(England) Bill Davies (Wales) Bert Hodson (England) Abe Mitchell (England) Mark Seymour (England) Ernest Whitcombe		Royal Dublin
4th	1930	(England) Charles Whitcombe	289		8 strokes	(England) Abe Mitchell		Royal Portrush (Dunluce)
3rd	1929	(England) Abe Mitchell	309		Playoff	(England) Archie Compston (England) Len Holland		Portmarnock
2nd	1928	(England) Ernest Whitcombe	288		4 strokes	(England) Archie Compston	150	Royal County Down (Championship)
1st	1927	(Scotland) George Duncan	312		1 stroke	(England) Henry Cotton	150	Portmarnock

== See also ==
- Open golf tournament
