= 2005 Seve Trophy =

Coordinates: 54.6262°N 1.3370°W

- Dates: 22–25 September
- Venue: Wynyard Golf Club
- Location: County Durham, England
- Captains: Colin Montgomerie (GB&I); José María Olazábal (Europe)
(United Kingdom) (Republic of Ireland)	16½	11½	(Europe)
- Great Britain and Ireland wins the Seve Trophy

The 2005 Seve Trophy took place 22–25 September at Wynyard Golf Club, in North East England. The team captain for Great Britain and Ireland was Colin Montgomerie, with the captain for Continental Europe being José María Olazábal. The overall tournament host was Seve Ballesteros as he was unable to compete through injury. The trophy was retained for the second time by Great Britain and Ireland.

== Format ==
The format remained the same as in 2003 with the teams competing over four days with five fourball matches on both Thursday and Friday, four greensomes matches on Saturday morning, four foursomes matches on Saturday afternoon and ten singles on Sunday. It means a total of 28 points were available with 14½ points required for victory.

Each member of the winner team received €125,000, the losing team €75,000 each, giving a total prize fund of €2,000,000.

== Teams ==
The teams were made up of the captain, the leading four players from the Official World Golf Ranking as of Monday 5 September 2005, the leading four players (not otherwise qualified) from the European Order of Merit after the Linde German Masters (11 September 2005), and one captain's pick.

Team GB&I
Name	Country	Qualification
Colin Montgomerie	Scotland	Playing captain
Pádraig Harrington	Ireland	World rankings
David Howell	England	World rankings
Paul McGinley	Ireland	World rankings
Graeme McDowell	Northern Ireland	World rankings
Nick Dougherty	England	European points
Stephen Dodd	Wales	European points
Ian Poulter	England	European points
Bradley Dredge	Wales	European points
Paul Casey	England	Captain's pick

Team Continental Europe
Name	Country	Qualification
José María Olazábal	Spain	Playing Captain
Thomas Bjørn	Denmark	World rankings
Miguel Ángel Jiménez	Spain	World rankings
Henrik Stenson	Sweden	World rankings
Niclas Fasth	Sweden	World rankings
Peter Hanson	Sweden	European points
Maarten Lafeber	Netherlands	European points
Jean-François Remésy	France	European points
Emanuele Canonica	Italy	European points
Thomas Levet	France	Captain's pick

== Day one ==
Thursday, 22 September 2005

=== Fourball ===
	Results
Poulter/Dougherty	(Europe) 2 up	Bjørn/Stenson
Montgomerie/McDowell	(United Kingdom) (Republic of Ireland) 4 & 2	Lafeber/Canonica
Dodd/Dredge	(Europe) 4 & 2	Jiménez/Olazábal
Howell/Casey	(Europe) 3 & 2	Fasth/Hanson
Harrington/McGinley	(Europe) 1 up	Remésy/Levet
1	Session	4
1	Overall	4

== Day two ==
Friday, 23 September 2005

=== Fourball ===
	Results
McGinley/Harrington	(United Kingdom) (Republic of Ireland) 3 & 1	Fasth/Hanson
Casey/Howell	(United Kingdom) (Republic of Ireland) 5 & 4	Jiménez/Olazábal
Montgomerie/McDowell	(Europe) 3 & 2	Bjørn/Stenson
Dodd/Dredge	(Europe) 2 up	Lafeber/Canonica
Dougherty/Poulter	(United Kingdom) (Republic of Ireland) 5 & 4	Remésy/Levet
3	Session	2
4	Overall	6

== Day three ==
Saturday, 24 September 2005

=== Morning greensomes ===
	Results
McGinley/Harrington	(United Kingdom) (Republic of Ireland) 3 & 2	Levet/Olazábal
Howell/Casey	(United Kingdom) (Republic of Ireland) 2 up	Fasth/Hanson
Dodd/McDowell	halved	Jiménez/Canonica
Poulter/Dougherty	halved	Bjørn/Stenson
3	Session	1
7	Overall	7

=== Afternoon foursomes ===
	Results
McGinley/Harrington	halved	Levet/Remésy
Howell/Casey	(United Kingdom) (Republic of Ireland) 2 & 1	Jiménez/Canonica
Dredge/Poulter	(Europe) 1 up	Fasth/Stenson
Montgomerie/Dougherty	(United Kingdom) (Republic of Ireland) 1 up	Bjørn/Lafeber
2½	Session	1½
9½	Overall	8½

== Day four ==
Sunday, 25 September 2005

=== Singles ===
	Results
Colin Montgomerie	(Europe) 2 & 1	José María Olazábal
Paul Casey	(United Kingdom) (Republic of Ireland) 4 & 3	Niclas Fasth
Ian Poulter	halved	Peter Hanson
David Howell	(United Kingdom) (Republic of Ireland) 6 & 5	Thomas Bjørn
Stephen Dodd	(United Kingdom) (Republic of Ireland) 2 & 1	Jean-François Remésy
Bradley Dredge	(United Kingdom) (Republic of Ireland) 2 & 1	Thomas Levet
Graeme McDowell	(United Kingdom) (Republic of Ireland) 5 & 4	Maarten Lafeber
Paul McGinley	(United Kingdom) (Republic of Ireland) 1 up	Miguel Ángel Jiménez
Pádraig Harrington	(Europe) 2 & 1	Emanuele Canonica
Nick Dougherty	halved	Henrik Stenson
7	Session	3
16½	Overall	11½
