= Portstewart Golf Club =

Golf course in Portstewart, Northern Ireland

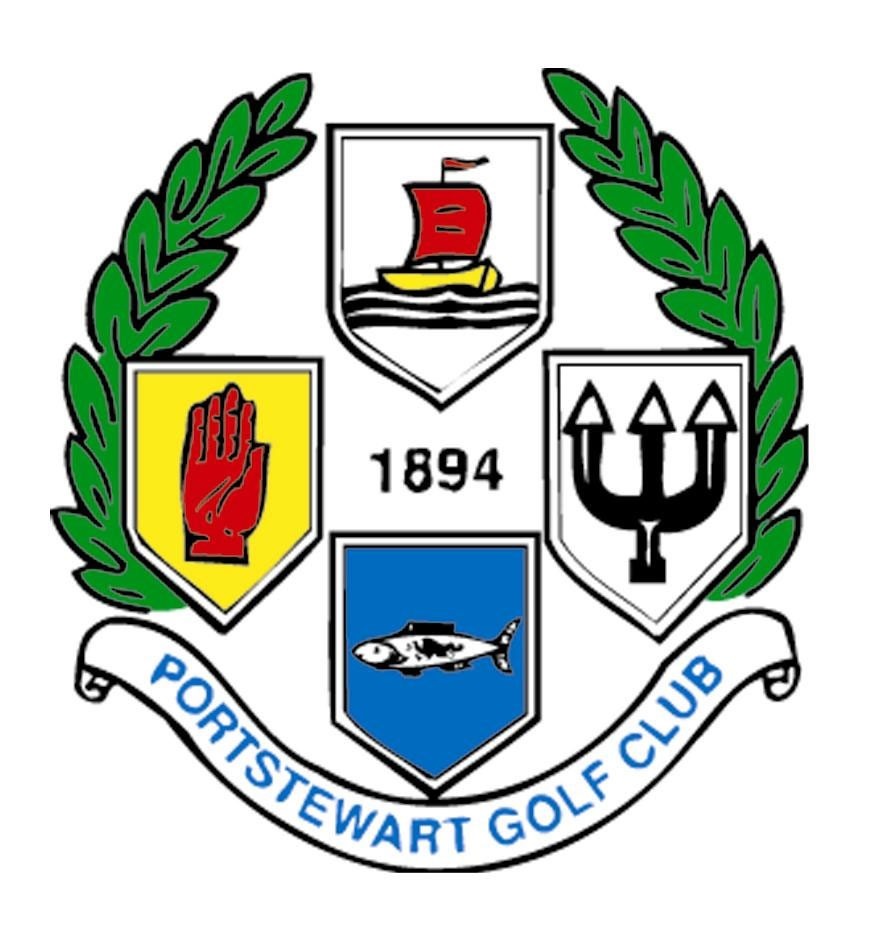

- Location in Northern Ireland
- 55.167°N 6.726°W

Club information
- Location: Portstewart, County Londonderry, Northern Ireland
- Established: 1894, 132 years ago
- Total holes: 54
- Tournaments: Irish PGA Championship (1931, 1974); Ladies Irish Open (1982, 1983); The Amateur Championship (2014); British Ladies Amateur (2015); Irish Open (2017); Boys Amateur Championship (2018)
- Website: www.portstewartgc.co.uk

Strand Course
- Designed by: Des Giffin
- Par: 72
- Length: 7,118 yards (6,509 m)
- Course record: 63: David Drysdale (2017)

Riverside Course
- Par: 68
- Length: 5,674 yards (5,188 m)

Old Course
- Par: 64
- Length: 4,822 yards (4,409 m)

Portstewart Golf Club consists of three 18-hole courses situated in the town of Portstewart, County Londonderry, Northern Ireland. Golf was first played there as far back as 1889.

The three courses are: the Strand Course (par 72), a championship course, the Riverside Course (par 68) and the Old Course (par 64), which is where the club was founded in 1894.

Portstewart Golf Club hosted the Dubai Duty Free Irish Open in 2017, setting up a three-week spell of links golf culminating in The Open Championship.

== History ==
The club was founded in 1894 and started off as 9 holes at the existing location of the Old Course. This was upgraded to 18 holes in 1934.

In 1920 the club built another clubhouse at Strand Head and Willie Park Jr. designed 18 holes and this is now currently the Strand Course. In 1986 the club purchased land in the sand dunes known as 'Thistly Hollow' which allowed seven new stunning holes to be built in these towering dunes and in natural links land, these holes were designed by club member Des Giffin.

Due to this makeover on the Strand Course left an extra 9 holes from the original layout, which was expanded to 18 holes in 2001 and this is now currently the Riverside Course.

== Tournaments ==
The club held a qualifying round for The Open Championship in 1951 when it was played at Royal Portrush. The club played host to the Irish Amateur Close Championship in 1992, and has hosted other events such as the Irish Professional and Irish Amateur. The British Girls Championship was also hosted in 2006, won by Belen Mozo of Spain.

Most recently it has co-hosted The Amateur Championship in 2014 along with Royal Portrush which was won by Bradley Neil of Scotland. It also co-hosted the Boys Amateur Championship in 2018 alongside Royal Portrush which was won by Conor Gough of England. It has hosted the British Ladies Amateur Championship as well in 2015, won by Céline Boutier of France.

In 2017, Portstewart hosted the Dubai Duty Free Irish Open, from 6–9 July for the first time in the club's history. This was by far the biggest tournament the club had ever hosted and attracted crowds of 92,000+ for the whole week. The young Spaniard Jon Rahm took the title and shot an Irish Open record score of 24 under par for 4 days. David Drysdale broke the course record for The Strand Course by carding a 63 on the final day.

Portstewart hosted the North of Ireland Amateur Championship in 2019 along with Castlerock due to Royal Portrush's closure as the 2019 Open Championship host.

== Scorecard ==
Strand Links – Championship tees

Hole	Name	Yards	Par	Hole	Name	Yards	Par
1	Tubber Patrick	427	4	10	Fisherman's Walk	407	4
2	Devil's Hill	366	4	11	Fernside	407	4
3	The Settlement	218	3	12	Barmouth	167	3
4	Thistly Hollow	583	5	13	Cashlandoo	555	5
5	Rifle Range	461	4	14	The Hill	522	5
6	Five Penny Piece	143	3	15	Articlave	198	3
7	Strawberry Hill	516	5	16	The Plateau	418	4
8	Portnahapple	445	4	17	Agherton	436	4
9	Larkhill	378	4	18	Strand Head	471	4
Out		3,537	36	In		3,581	36
				Total		7,118	72

== See also ==
- Royal Portrush Golf Club
- Royal County Down Golf Club
- Ballyliffin Golf Club
