= Steve Webster (golfer) =

English professional golfer

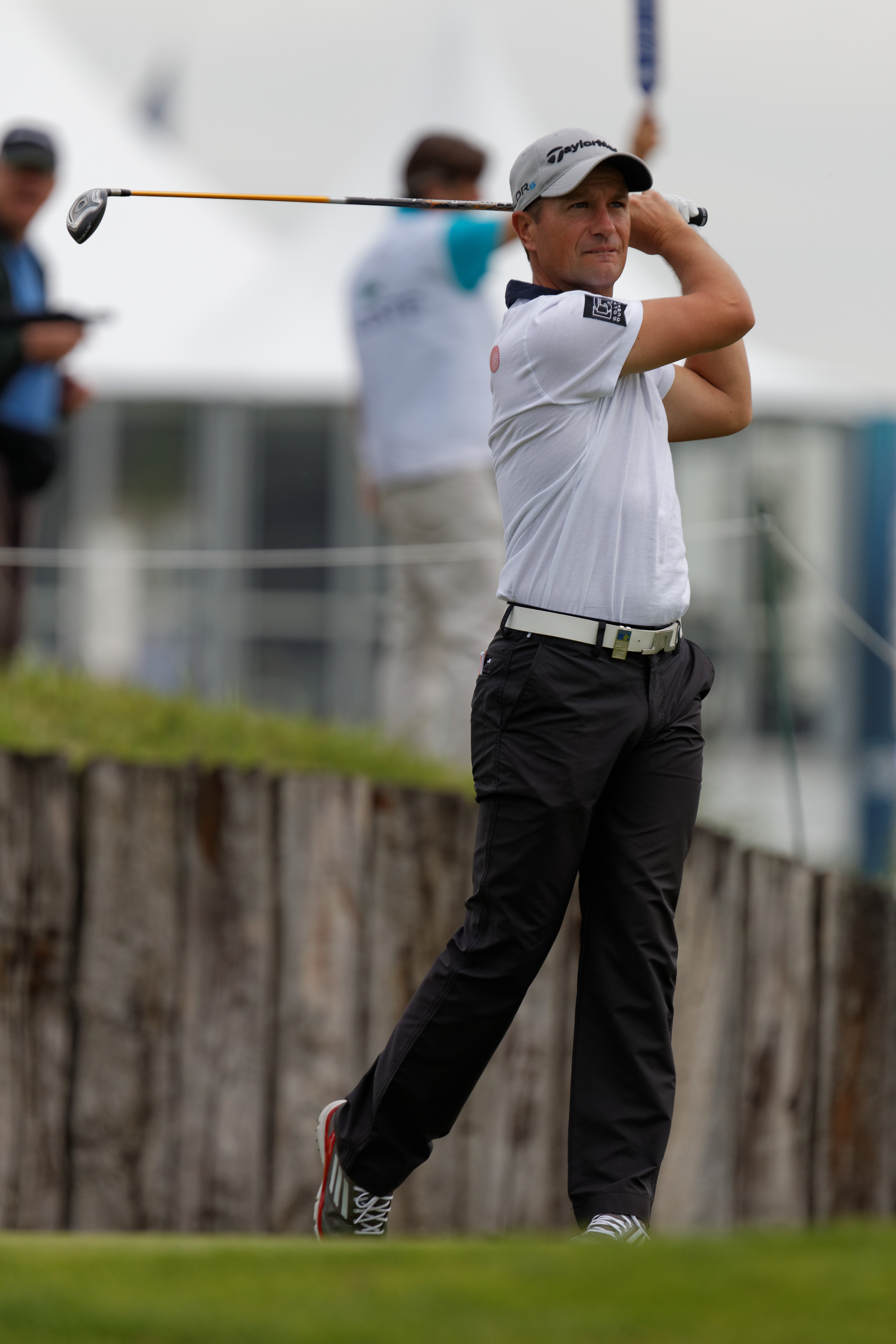

Personal information
- Full name: Steve Webster
- Nationality: England
- Born: 17 January 1975 (age 51) Nuneaton, Warwickshire, England
- Height: 5 ft 8 in (1.73 m)
- Weight: 154 lb (70 kg; 11.0 st)

Career
- Sport: Golf
- Turned professional: 1995
- Current tour: European Senior Tour
- Former tours: European Tour; Challenge Tour
- Professional wins: 3
- Highest ranking: 72 (27 January 2008)

Number of wins by tour
- European Tour: 2
- European Senior Tour: 1

Best results in major championships
- Masters Tournament: DNP
- PGA Championship: T59: 2005
- U.S. Open: DNP
- The Open Championship: T24: 1995

Steve Webster (born 17 January 1975) is an English professional golfer.

== Early life and amateur career ==
Webster was born in Nuneaton, Warwickshire and was brought up in nearby Atherstone. He finished tied for 24th place in the 1995 Open Championship at St Andrews, winning the silver medal as low amateur ahead of Tiger Woods.

== Professional career ==
In 1995, he turned professional. Webster was medalist at the 1995 European Tour Qualifying School. He finished in 129th place on the Order of Merit in his rookie season, just missing out on retaining his playing privileges and forcing him to return to qualifying school, where he was again successful. Since 1997 he has made the top 100 on the Order of Merit every season, to comfortably retain his place on Europe's elite tour.

In 2005, Webster won his first European Tour title at the Telecom Italia Open, and finished a career best 29th on the Order of Merit. In 2007, he won his second European Tour event at the Portugal Masters.

== Amateur wins ==
- 1992 McGregor Trophy
- 1993 Peter McEvoy Trophy

== Professional wins (3) ==
=== European Tour wins (2) ===
No.	Date	Tournament	Winning score	Margin of victory	Runner(s)-up
1	8 May 2005	Telecom Italia Open	−18 (68-68-66-68=270)	3 strokes	(Wales) Bradley Dredge, (England) Richard Finch, (Denmark) Anders Hansen
2	21 Oct 2007	Portugal Masters	−25 (66-66-67-64=263)	2 strokes	(Sweden) Robert Karlsson

European Tour playoff record (0–2)

No.	Year	Tournament	Opponent(s)	Result
1	2001	Telefónica Open de Madrid	(South Africa) Retief Goosen	Lost to birdie on third extra hole
2	2012	Nelson Mandela Championship	(Spain) Eduardo de la Riva, (Scotland) Scott Jamieson	Jamieson won with par on second extra hole de la Riva eliminated by par on first hole

=== European Senior Tour wins (1) ===
No.	Date	Tournament	Winning score	Margin of victory	Runners-up
1	24 Aug 2025	Grass & Co. English Legends	−12 (68-66-73=207)	2 strokes	(Wales) Bradley Dredge, (South Africa) Keith Horne

== Team appearances ==
- Seve Trophy (representing Great Britain & Ireland): 2002 (winners), 2009 (winners)

== Results in major championships ==
Tournament	1995	1996	1997	1998	1999
The Open Championship	T24LA				
PGA Championship					

Tournament	2000	2001	2002	2003	2004	2005	2006	2007	2008	2009
The Open Championship	CUT					T41			CUT	
PGA Championship						T59			CUT	CUT

Note: Webster never played in the Masters Tournament or the U.S. Open.

Did not play

LA = Low amateur
CUT = missed the half-way cut
"T" = tied

== Results in World Golf Championships ==
Tournament	2008
Match Play	
Championship	
Invitational	T61

Did not play

"T" = Tied

== Team appearances ==
Amateur

- European Boys' Team Championship (representing England): 1994 (winners)
- Jacques Léglise Trophy (representing Great Britain and Ireland): 1994 (winners)

Professional

- Seve Trophy (representing Great Britain & Ireland): 2002 (winners), 2009 (winners)
