= 1946 Open Championship =

Coordinates: 56.343°N 2.803°W

Tournament information
- Dates: 3–5 July 1946
- Location: St Andrews, Scotland
- Course: Old Course at St Andrews

Statistics
- Par: 73
- Length: 6,863 yards (6,276 m)
- Field: 100, 38 after cut
- Cut: 156 (+10)
- Prize fund: £1,000 $4,000
- Winner's share: £150 $600

Champion
- (United States) Sam Snead
- 290 (−2)

Location in Scotland
Location in Fife, Scotland

The 1946 Open Championship was the 75th Open Championship, played 3–5 July at the Old Course at St Andrews, Scotland. Due to World War II, it was the first Open since 1939, also held at St Andrews. Sam Snead won his only Open title, four strokes ahead of runners-up Johnny Bulla and Bobby Locke. It was the first win by an American in thirteen years and the second of Snead's seven major titles. Four Americans were in the field of 100; the three that made the cut all finished in the top ten.

Qualifying took place on 1–2 July, Monday and Tuesday, with 18 holes on the Old Course and 18 holes on the New Course. The number of qualifiers was limited to a maximum of 100, ties for 100th place would not qualify. The qualifying score was 159 and exactly 100 players qualified. The Australian Norman Von Nida led the qualifiers at 145. The maximum number of players making the cut after 36 holes was set at forty and ties for 40th place did not make the cut.

In his second Open Championship appearance and first since 1937, Snead did not endear himself to the St Andrews crowd on arrival. His first impression of the course was "It looks like an old abandoned kinda place," ensuring a cold reception at the start of the tournament. He opened with a round of 71, two behind the lead of Locke, who led by one from Henry Cotton and Von Nida. Cotton took the lead after 36-holes with consecutive rounds of 70, one ahead of Snead and two ahead of Dai Rees.

Snead, Bulla, and Rees were tied for the lead at 215 (−4) going into the final round on Friday afternoon, with Cotton one behind. Snead best navigated the strong winds of the final round; after dropping four shots on the front-nine, he was able to use his length and accuracy to record a 35 on the back for a round of 75 and a 290 total. Locke moved into second with a 76, while Bulla finished with a 79 to tie Locke for third place. Rees tied for fourth with the help of a tournament record-tying round of 67 in the second round.

Snead's win here was his only Open Championship title and he played the tournament only three more times, not returning until 1962. He was the first American to win the title since Denny Shute in 1933. The next was Ben Hogan in 1953 at Carnoustie in his only trip to Britain, then Arnold Palmer's consecutive wins in 1961 and 1962.

Dick Burton, the defending champion from 1939, relinquished the trophy after seven years and finished in twelfth place.

== Round summaries ==
=== First round ===
Wednesday, 3 July 1946

Place	Player	Score	To par
1	(South Africa) Bobby Locke	69	−4
T2	(England) Henry Cotton	70	−3
T2	(Australia) Norman Von Nida	70	−3
T4	(United States) Johnny Bulla	71	−2
T4	(England) Bill Hancock	71	−2
T4	(Australia) Joe Kirkwood Sr.	71	−2
T4	(United States) Sam Snead	71	−2
T4	(England) Reg Whitcombe	71	−2
9	(England) Charlie Ward	73	E
T10	(England) Percy Alliss	74	+1
T10	(England) Dick Burton	74	+1

=== Second round ===
Thursday, 4 July 1946

Place	Player	Score	To par
1	(England) Henry Cotton	70-70=140	−6
2	(United States) Sam Snead	71-70=141	−5
3	(Wales) Dai Rees	75-67=142	−4
T4	(United States) Johnny Bulla	71-72=143	−3
T4	(South Africa) Bobby Locke	69-74=143	−3
T6	(England) Percy Alliss	74-72=146	E
T6	(Australia) Joe Kirkwood Sr.	71-75=146	E
T6	(Australia) Norman Von Nida	70-76=146	E
T6	(England) Charlie Ward	73-73=146	E
10	(England) Reg Whitcombe	71-76=147	+1

=== Third round ===
Friday, 5 July 1946 (morning)

Place	Player	Score	To par
T1	(United States) Johnny Bulla	71-72-72=215	−4
T1	(Wales) Dai Rees	75-67-73=215	−4
T1	(United States) Sam Snead	71-70-74=215	−4
4	(England) Henry Cotton	70-70-76=216	−3
5	(South Africa) Bobby Locke	69-74-75=218	−1
6	(England) Charlie Ward	73-73-73=219	E
7	(Australia) Norman Von Nida	70-76-74=220	−1
T8	(Northern Ireland) Fred Daly	77-71-76=224	+5
T8	(Australia) Joe Kirkwood Sr.	71-75-78=224	+5
10	(United States) Lawson Little	78-75-72=225	+6

=== Final round ===
Friday, 5 July 1946 (afternoon)

Place	Player	Score	To par	Money (£)
1	(United States) Sam Snead	71-70-74-75=290	−2	150
T2	(United States) Johnny Bulla	71-72-72-79=294	+2	87 ½
T2	(South Africa) Bobby Locke	69-74-75-76=294	+2	87 ½
T4	(England) Henry Cotton	70-70-76-79=295	+3	26 ¼
T4	(Wales) Dai Rees	75-67-73-80=295	+3	26 ¼
T4	(Australia) Norman Von Nida	70-76-74-75=295	+3	26 ¼
T4	(England) Charlie Ward	73-73-73-76=295	+3	26 ¼
T8	(Northern Ireland) Fred Daly	77-71-76-74=298	+6	15
T8	(Australia) Joe Kirkwood Sr.	71-75-78-74=298	+6	15
10	(United States) Lawson Little	78-75-72-74=299	+7	15

Amateurs: Bell (+24), Wilson (+25), Dowie (+27), White (+28), Urry (+38).
