= Carlos Durán =

Chilean football manager (born 1958)

Personal information
- Full name: Carlos Durán
- Date of birth: 10 August 1958 (age 68)
- Place of birth: Santiago, Chile
- Height: 1.78 m (5 ft 10 in)

Managerial career
- Years: Team
- 1999: Colo-Colo (caretaker)
- 2000: Deportes Temuco

Carlos Durán (born 10 August 1958) is a Chilean football manager.

== Club career ==
During the 1990s, Durán worked with Colo-Colo youth ranks forming players like Sebastián González, Claudio Maldonado or Luis Ignacio Quinteros. In 1999 after Brazilian Nelsinho Baptista departure he was appointed as club's caretaker coach, staying in the charge two weeks before Uruguayan Fernando Morena arrival.

On 24 January 2000, it was confirmed his division from the team after a break with the club's board. Then on mid year he joined Primera B de Chile side Deportes Temuco, signing a three-year contract. However, he failed to continue at Temuco–based team after legal issues between both where Durán won a lawsuit for $40 million pesos due to contractual irregularities.
