= 2002 Seve Trophy =

Coordinates: 53.0932°N 6.0785°W

- Dates: 19–21 April 2002
- Venue: Druids Glen
- Location: Newtownmountkennedy, County Wicklow, Ireland
- Captains: Colin Montgomerie (GB&I); Seve Ballesteros (Europe)
(United Kingdom) (Republic of Ireland)	14½	11½	(Europe)
- Great Britain and Ireland wins the Seve Trophy

The 2002 Seve Trophy golf tournament took place 19–21 April at Druids Glen, Newtownmountkennedy, County Wicklow, Ireland. The team captain for Great Britain and Ireland was Colin Montgomerie, with the captain for Continental Europe being Seve Ballesteros. The competition was won by Great Britain and Ireland.

== Format ==
The teams competed over three days with four greensomes matches and four foursomes matches on Friday, four fourball matches and four foursomes matches on Saturday and ten singles on Sunday.

Each member of the winner team received €150,000, the losing team €90,000 each, giving a total prize fund of €2,400,000.

== Teams ==
Both captains played and had one wild card selection each. The remaining 8 players in each team were the top 8 from the Seve Trophy points table, which started with the Open de Espana (19–22 April 2001) and which was finalised on 31 March 2002.

Team GB&I
Name	Country	Qualification
Colin Montgomerie	Scotland	Playing captain
Paul Casey	England	Seve Trophy points
Darren Clarke	Northern Ireland	Seve Trophy points
Pádraig Harrington	Ireland	Seve Trophy points
Paul Lawrie	Scotland	Seve Trophy points
Andrew Oldcorn	Scotland	Seve Trophy points
Paul McGinley	Ireland	Seve Trophy points
Steve Webster	England	Seve Trophy points
Ian Woosnam	Wales	Seve Trophy points
Lee Westwood	England	Captain's pick

Oldcorn was a late replacement for David Howell.

Team Continental Europe
Name	Country	Qualification
Seve Ballesteros	Spain	Playing captain
Thomas Bjørn	Denmark	Seve Trophy points
Niclas Fasth	Sweden	Seve Trophy points
Mathias Grönberg	Sweden	Seve Trophy points
Raphaël Jacquelin	France	Seve Trophy points
Miguel Ángel Jiménez	Spain	Seve Trophy points
Robert Karlsson	Sweden	Seve Trophy points
Thomas Levet	France	Seve Trophy points
José María Olazábal	Spain	Seve Trophy points
Alex Čejka	Germany	Captain's pick

== Day one ==
Friday, 19 April 2002

=== Morning greensomes ===
	Results
Montgomerie/Lawrie	(Europe) 2 & 1	Bjørn/Karlsson
Woosnam/Webster	(United Kingdom) (Republic of Ireland) 3 & 2	Olazábal/Jiménez
Harrington/McGinley	(United Kingdom) (Republic of Ireland) 1 up	Grönberg/Čejka
Westwood/Clarke	(Europe) 2 & 1	Levet/Jacquelin
2	Session	2
2	Overall	2

=== Afternoon foursomes ===
	Results
Montgomerie/Oldcorn	(United Kingdom) (Republic of Ireland) 2 & 1	Fasth/Karlsson
Webster/Casey	(Europe) 1 up	Olazábal/Jiménez
Harrington/McGinley	(United Kingdom) (Republic of Ireland) 1 up	Jacquelin/Levet
Clarke/Westwood	(United Kingdom) (Republic of Ireland) 3 & 2	Bjørn/Čejka
3	Session	1
5	Overall	3

== Day two ==
Saturday, 20 April 2002

=== Morning fourball ===
	Results
Lawrie/Casey	(United Kingdom) (Republic of Ireland) 2 & 1	Bjørn/Fasth
Montgomerie/Woosnam	(United Kingdom) (Republic of Ireland) 4 & 3	Karlsson/Grönberg
Harrington/McGinley	(Europe) 2 & 1	Olazábal/Ballesteros
Westwood/Clarke	(United Kingdom) (Republic of Ireland) 1 up	Jacquelin/Jiménez
3	Session	1
8	Overall	4

=== Afternoon foursomes ===
	Results
Woosnam/Webster	halved	Bjørn/Karlsson
Harrington/McGinley	(United Kingdom) (Republic of Ireland) 1 up	Čejka/Fasth
Lawrie/Oldcorn	halved	Levet/Jacquelin
Montgomerie/Clarke	(Europe) 1 up	Olazábal/Jiménez
2	Session	2
10	Overall	6

== Day three ==
Sunday, 21 April 2002

=== Singles ===
	Results
Colin Montgomerie	(Europe) 1 up	Seve Ballesteros
Darren Clarke	(United Kingdom) (Republic of Ireland) 4 & 3	Thomas Bjørn
Paul Casey	(Europe) 4 & 3	Miguel Ángel Jiménez
Paul Lawrie	(Europe) 1 up	Robert Karlsson
Andrew Oldcorn	halved	Niclas Fasth
Lee Westwood	(United Kingdom) (Republic of Ireland) 3 & 2	Raphaël Jacquelin
Pádraig Harrington	(United Kingdom) (Republic of Ireland) 3 & 2	José María Olazábal
Paul McGinley	(United Kingdom) (Republic of Ireland) 4 & 3	Mathias Grönberg
Steve Webster	(Europe) 2 & 1	Thomas Levet
Ian Woosnam	(Europe) 5 & 4	Alex Čejka
4½	Session	5½
14½	Overall	11½
