= Baltray =

Village in County Louth, Ireland

Baltray Baile Trá
- Village
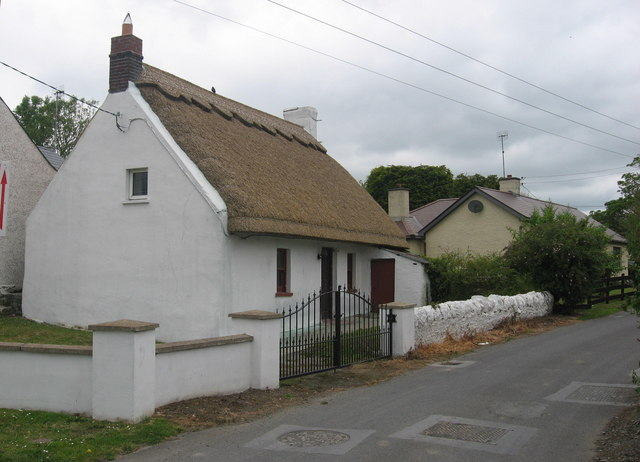
- Restored thatched cottage in Baltray

- Location in Ireland
- Coordinates: 53°44′N 6°16′W
- Country: Ireland
- Province: Leinster
- County: County Louth

Population (2016)
  - Total: 132

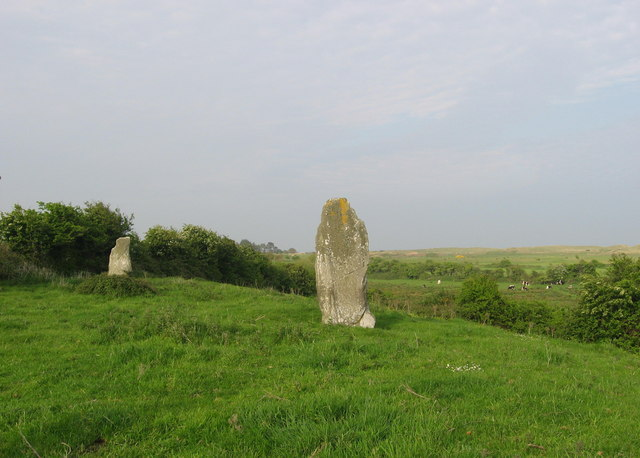
Standing Stones at Baltray

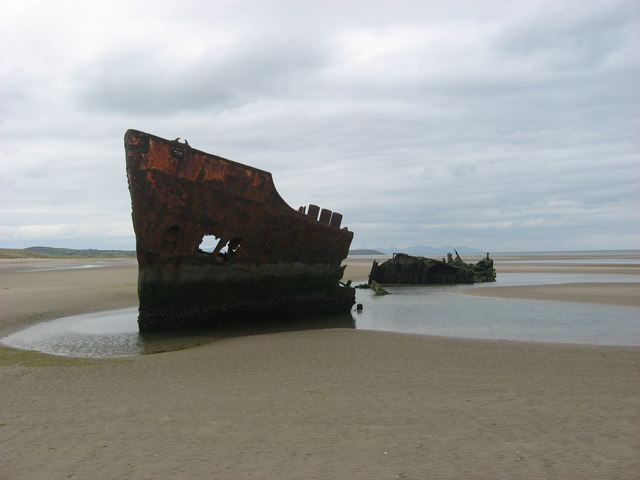
Shipwreck on Baltray strand

Baltray (historically Ballytra, from Irish: Baile Trá, meaning 'town of the beach') is a village and townland in County Louth, Ireland. It sits on the northern shore of the River Boyne estuary.

== Amenities ==
The village has developed since the latter half of the twentieth century as a dormitory village serving the nearby town of Drogheda, which is located inland, to the west of Baltray. Baltray has a public house.

Baltray is home to the County Louth Golf Club. This links course has hosted several championships over its history, including the Irish Open in 2004 and 2009.

The area is also known for the "Baltray standing stones", a group of megaliths.

== Transport ==
Bus Éireann route 168 serves Baltray several times a day linking it to Drogheda, Duleek, Ashbourne, Termonfeckin and Clogherhead. Drogheda railway station is approximately 8 km distant.

== Conservation ==
Baltray is home to the Little Tern Conservation Project which is run by Louth Nature Trust. The project began in 2007 and runs each year from May to August when part of the beach at the Haven is fenced to protect nesting Little Terns. These birds are an Annex 1 species under the EU Birds Directive (79/409/EEC), thus EU member states are required to take special conservation measures to ensure that little terns remain at a favourable conservation status.
