= 1939 Open Championship =

Coordinates: 56.343°N 2.803°W

Tournament information
- Dates: 5–7 July 1939
- Location: St Andrews, Scotland
- Course: Old Course at St Andrews

Statistics
- Par: 73
- Length: 6,842 yards (6,256 m)
- Field: 129 players, 34 after cut
- Cut: 150 (+4)
- Prize fund: £500
- Winner's share: £100

Champion
- (England) Dick Burton
- 290 (−2)

Location in Scotland
Location in Fife, Scotland

The 1939 Open Championship was the 74th Open Championship, held 5–7 July at the Old Course in St Andrews, Scotland. Dick Burton won his only major title, two strokes ahead of runner-up Johnny Bulla. The purse was £500 with a winner's share of £100. It was the last Open played for seven years, due to World War II.

Qualifying took place on 3–4 July, Monday and Tuesday, with 18 holes on the Old Course and 18 holes on the New Course. As in the previous year, the number of qualifiers was limited to a maximum of 130, and ties for 130th place did not qualify. For the first time a prize of £20 was awarded to the professional with the lowest qualifying score. Amateur Jimmy Bruen led the qualifiers on 138 with Henry Cotton next on 142; the qualifying score was 156 and 129 players advanced.

Despite taking an eight at the 14th hole, Bobby Locke opened the championship on Wednesday with a round of 70 (−3), tying Burton for the lead. In the second round on Thursday, Locke again found trouble on 14, and after a ball out of bounds fell out of the lead. The maximum number of players making the cut after 36 holes was increased from 40 to 44, and ties for 44th place did not make the cut. Eleven players tied for 35th place, so only 34 players made the cut.

John Fallon was the surprise leader after 54 holes by two shots, but he could not cope with the strong winds and fell back to 3rd place with a final round 79 (+6). Bulla, the only American to make the 36-hole cut, began the final round on Friday afternoon four strokes behind Fallon. At the second hole, he hooked his drive over the parallel 17th fairway and into a railway yard; he finished with a round of even-par 73 and established a clubhouse lead of at even par 292. Burton, setting out just as Bulla was finishing, needed a 72 to win the title and came to the 18th needing a par four. He hit a drive over 300 yards (270 m), pitched to 15 feet (4.5 m), then holed the birdie putt for a two-shot win.

The previous three Opens at St Andrews had been won by Americans; Burton was the first Briton to win the Open at the Old Course since 1910, won by James Braid of Scotland. Since Burton's 1939 win, the sole British winner at St Andrews was Nick Faldo of England in 1990. Burton enlisted in the Royal Air Force shortly after his win.

This was the last Open for seven years, until 1946; World War II started in September 1939 and the championship was canceled through 1945. Birkdale Golf Club was scheduled as the venue for the 1940 championship, its first, but did not host until 1954.

== Course ==
Hole	Name	Yards	Par	Hole	Name	Yards	Par
1	Burn	374	4	10	Tenth ^	314	4
2	Dyke	411	4	11	High (In)	170	3
3	Cartgate (Out)	367	4	12	Heathery (In)	316	4
4	Ginger Beer	424	4	13	Hole O'Cross (In)	422	4
5	Hole O'Cross (Out)	576	5	14	Long	564	5
6	Heathery (Out)	377	4	15	Cartgate (In)	424	4
7	High (Out)	354	4	16	Corner of the Dyke	380	4
8	Short	163	3	17	Road	466	5
9	End	359	4	18	Tom Morris	381	4
Out		3,405	36	In		3,437	37
Source:				Total		6,842	73

^ The 10th hole was posthumously named for Bobby Jones in 1972

== Round summaries ==
=== First round ===
Wednesday, 5 July 1939

Place	Player	Score	To par
T1	(England) Dick Burton	70	−3
T1	(England) Harry Busson	70	−3
T1	(England) Max Faulkner	70	−3
T1	(South Africa) Bobby Locke	70	−3
T5	(England) Bill Davies	71	−2
T5	(Scotland) John Fallon	71	−2
T5	(England) Alf Perry	71	−2
T5	(Argentina) Martin Pose	71	−2
T5	(Wales) Dai Rees	71	−2
T5	(England) Reg Whitcombe	71	−2

=== Second round ===
Thursday, 6 July 1939

Place	Player	Score	To par
1	(England) Dick Burton	70-72=142	−4
2	(Argentina) Martin Pose	71-72=143	−3
3	(Scotland) John Fallon	71-73=144	−2
T4	(England) Harry Busson	70-75=145	−1
T4	(England) Syd Easterbrook	74-71=145	−1
T4	(South Africa) Bobby Locke	70-75=145	−1
T4	(England) Alf Perry	71-74=145	−1
T4	(Wales) Dai Rees	71-74=145	−1
T4	(Australia) Bill Shankland	72-73=145	−1
T10	(England) Henry Cotton	74-72=146	E
T10	(England) Max Faulkner	70-76=146	E
T10	(England) Sam King	74-72=146	E
T10	(England) Reg Whitcombe	71-75=146	E

=== Third round ===
Friday, 7 July 1939 (morning)

Place	Player	Score	To par
1	(Scotland) John Fallon	71-73-71=215	−4
2	(Australia) Bill Shankland	72-73-72=217	−2
3	(England) Alf Perry	71-74-73=218	−1
T4	(United States) Johnny Bulla	77-71-71=219	E
T4	(England) Dick Burton	70-72-77=219	E
T4	(Argentina) Martin Pose	71-72-76=219	E
T7	(Wales) Dai Rees	71-74-75=220	+1
T7	(England) Reg Whitcombe	71-75-74=220	+1
T9	(England) Sam King	74-72-75=221	+2
T9	(South Africa) Bobby Locke	70-75-76=221	+2

=== Final round ===
Friday, 7 July 1939 (afternoon)

Place	Player	Score	To par	Money (£)
1	(England) Dick Burton	70-72-77-71=290	−2	100
2	(United States) Johnny Bulla	77-71-71-73=292	E	75
T3	(Scotland) John Fallon	71-73-71-79=294	+2	29
T3	(England) Sam King	74-72-75-73=294	+2	29
T3	(England) Alf Perry	71-74-73-76=294	+2	29
T3	(Australia) Bill Shankland	72-73-72-77=294	+2	29
T3	(England) Reg Whitcombe	71-75-74-74=294	+2	29
8	(Argentina) Martin Pose	71-72-76-76=295	+3	15
T9	(England) Percy Alliss	75-73-74-74=296	+4	11; 13s 4d
T9	(England) Bob Kenyon	73-75-74-74=296	+4	11; 13s 4d
T9	(South Africa) Bobby Locke	70-75-76-75=296	+4	11; 13s 4d

Amateurs: Bruen (+5), Kyle (+8), Crowley (+10), Dowie (+16), Sweeny (+16)
