= Malone Golf Club =

Golf club near Belfast, Northern Ireland

- Location near Belfast Malone Golf Club (Northern Ireland) Malone Golf Club (island of Ireland) Malone Golf Club (the United Kingdom)
- 54.538681°N 5.978420°W

Club information
- Location: Dunmurry, County Antrim, Northern Ireland
- Established: 1895, 131 years ago
- Type: Private
- Tota holes: 27
- Tournaments: Irish Open (1933)
- Website: malonegolfclub.co.uk

Drumbridge / Ballydrain
- Par: 70
- Length: 6,689 yards (6,116 m)

Edenderry
- Par: 36
- Length: 3,211 yards (2,936 m)

Malone Golf Club is a golf club located near Belfast, Northern Ireland.

== History ==
The club, founded in 1895, hosted the 1933 Irish Open, won by Bob Kenyon.

== Scorecards ==
Drumbridge

Hole	Name	Yards	Par
1		382	4
2		543	5
3		456	4
4		166	3
5		438	4
6		195	3
7		487	4
8		365	4
9		365	4
Out		3,597	35

Ballydrain

Hole	Name	Yards	Par
1		420	4
2		394	4
3		193	3
4		428	4
5		423	4
6		169	3
7		309	4
8		525	5
9		431	4
Out		3,292	35
