= Druids Glen =

Golf resort in County Wicklow, Ireland

Druid's Glen
- Location within Ireland
- 53.0932°N 6.0785°W

Club information
- Location: Newtownmountkennedy, County Wicklow, Ireland
- Established: 1995, 31 years ago
- Type: Private
- Tota holes: 36
- Tournaments: Seve Trophy - (2002); Irish Open (1996–99)
- Website: druidsglenresort.com

Druids Glen - (1995)
- Par: 71
- Length: 7,046 yards (6,443 m)

Druid's Glen is a hotel and golf resort in Newtownmountkennedy, Republic of Ireland, situated about 35 kilometres (22 mi) south of Dublin in County Wicklow. The resort consists of the 5-star Druid's Glen Hotel & Country Club, two championship golf courses, and Woodstock House, the clubhouse at Druid's Glen.

The "Druids Glen Golf Course", opened in 1995, and was the venue for the Irish Open between 1996 and 1999, and the 2002 Seve Trophy. The second course on the site is the "Druids Heath Golf Course", which opened in 2003 and has hosted 'the Irish PGA'.

Druids Glen has now been reconstructed on HB studios The Golf Club Game on PS4, Xbox1 and PC via Steam in 2015.
