= Seve Trophy =

Golf tournament

Tournament information
- Location: 2013: Paris, France
- Established: 2000
- Course: 2013: Golf de Saint-Nom-la-Bretèche
- Par: 2013: 71
- Length: 2013: 6,983 yd (6,385 m)
- Tour: European Tour
- Format: Match play
- Prize fund: 2013: €1,750,000
- Final year: 2013

Final champion
- Continental Europe

The Seve Trophy was a biennial golf tournament between teams of professional male golfers; one team representing Great Britain and Ireland, the other team representing Continental Europe. The tournament was played in years when there is no Ryder Cup. The competition was held eight times from 2000 to 2013.

The Trophy was named after five times major winner Seve Ballesteros, the most successful golfer ever from Continental Europe who was one of the key instigators of the tournament. He made an exceptional contribution to the European Ryder Cup successes of the 1980s and 1990s, and came to be regarded as an exceptionally keen team man in a usually individualistic sport.

A sponsorship deal with the French media conglomerate Vivendi meant that the 2009 was known as The Vivendi Trophy with Seve Ballesteros, the 2011 event was the Vivendi Seve Trophy and the 2013 event was known as the Seve Trophy by Golf+.

== Schedule ==
The event was played in years when there is no Ryder Cup. Initially this meant even numbered years, but because the 2001 Ryder Cup was postponed by a year due to the terrorist attacks on 11 September 2001, the Seve Trophy was then played in odd numbered years. In 2002 both events were played.

In 2000 and 2002, the event was played in April but from 2003 it was played in the autumn. In 2005, 2007 and 2013 it was held in the same week as Europe's Ryder Cup opponents, Team USA, took on the "International Team" in the Presidents Cup, while in 2009 and 2011 it was scheduled during the PGA Tour's FedEx Cup playoffs.

The Seve Trophy was an "approved special event" on the European Tour. A week in the tour schedule was set aside for it, but the prize money did not count towards the Race to Dubai (previously the Order of Merit).

The 2013 event was the last.

== Format ==
The Seve Trophy was a team event for professional male golfers; one team representing Great Britain and Ireland, the other team representing Continental Europe.

In 2000 and 2002 the trophy was contested over three days (Friday to Sunday) with 8 foursomes/fourball/greensomes matches on each of the first two days (4 in the morning, 4 in the afternoon) and 10 singles matches on the last day. The format was therefore similar to that of the Ryder Cup except that there were less singles matches, since each team consisted of ten players, whereas in the Ryder Cup there are twelve players on each team. An unusual feature was the inclusion of one set of greensome matches.

In 2003, the trophy was extended to four days (Thursday to Sunday). On the first two days there were 5 fourball matches each day. The third day had 4 greensomes in the morning and 4 foursomes in the afternoon, with 10 singles matches on the fourth day. This format remained the same until 2013 when the greensome matches on the third morning were replaced with foursomes matches.

The winner of each match scores a point for his team, with ½ a point each for any match that is tied after the 18 holes. In 2000 and 2002 there were 26 points available and so 13½ points were required for victory. Since 2003 there have been 28 points available and so 14½ are now required for victory.

A foursomes match is a competition between two teams of two golfers. The golfers on the same team take alternate shots throughout the match, with the same ball. Each hole is won by the team that completes the hole in the fewest shots. A greensomes match is similar to a foursomes match except that both players tee off on every hole. Each pair then chooses one of their balls and alternate strokes are then played with that ball to complete the hole. A fourball match is also a competition between two teams of two golfers, but all four golfers play their own ball throughout the round rather than alternating shots, and each hole is won by the team whose individual golfer has the lowest score. A singles match is a standard match play competition between two golfers.

== Team qualification and selection ==
Two captains were chosen by the European Tour. From 2000 to 2005 the captain was automatically one of the members of his team. From 2007 they were non-playing captains.

Eligibility for the Seve Trophy was similar that of the Europe team in the Ryder Cup. Players had to be Europeans and be a member of the European Tour.

From 2000 to 2005, the captain had one "captain's pick", a player chosen at the discretion of the team captains, while in 2007 this was increased to two. However from 2009 team qualification was based solely on qualification criteria:

- The leading five eligible players in the Official World Golf Rankings
- The leading five eligible players on the European Tour Race to Dubai, not already selected on the first criterion

== Results ==
| Year | Venue | Winning team | Score | Britain and Ireland captain | Europe captain |
|---|---|---|---|---|---|
| 2013 | Golf de Saint-Nom-la-Bretèche, France | Continental Europe | 15–13 | Sam Torrance | José María Olazábal |
| 2011 | Golf de Saint-Nom-la-Bretèche, France | (United Kingdom) Great Britain and (Republic of Ireland) Ireland | 15½–12½ | Paul McGinley | Jean van de Velde |
| 2009 | Golf de Saint-Nom-la-Bretèche, France | (United Kingdom) Great Britain and (Republic of Ireland) Ireland | 16½–11½ | Paul McGinley | Thomas Bjørn |
| 2007 | The Heritage Golf & Spa Resort, Ireland | (United Kingdom) Great Britain and (Republic of Ireland) Ireland | 16½–11½ | Nick Faldo | Seve Ballesteros |
| 2005 | Wynyard Golf Club, England | (United Kingdom) Great Britain and (Republic of Ireland) Ireland | 16½–11½ | Colin Montgomerie | José María Olazábal |
| 2003 | Campo de Golf Parador El Saler, Spain | (United Kingdom) Great Britain and (Republic of Ireland) Ireland | 15–13 | Colin Montgomerie | Seve Ballesteros |
| 2002 | Druids Glen, Ireland | (United Kingdom) Great Britain and (Republic of Ireland) Ireland | 14½–11½ | Colin Montgomerie | Seve Ballesteros |
| 2000 | Sunningdale Golf Club, England | Continental Europe | 13½–12½ | Colin Montgomerie | Seve Ballesteros |

Of the 8 matches, the Great Britain and Ireland team won 6 while the Continental Europe team won 2.

== Appearances ==
The following are those who played in at least one of the matches.

=== Great Britain and Ireland ===
Paul Casey and Colin Montgomerie made the most appearances on the Great Britain and Ireland side, playing in five events each.

- (England) Phillip Archer 2007
- (England) John Bickerton 2000
- (England) Paul Casey 2002, 2003, 2005, 2007, 2013
- (Northern Ireland) Darren Clarke 2000, 2002, 2011
- (England) Brian Davis 2003
- (Wales) Stephen Dodd 2005
- (Wales) Jamie Donaldson 2011, 2013
- (England) Nick Dougherty 2005, 2007, 2009
- (Wales) Bradley Dredge 2005, 2007
- (England) Simon Dyson 2007, 2009, 2011
- (England) Ross Fisher 2009, 2011
- (England) Tommy Fleetwood 2013
- (England) Mark Foster 2011
- (Scotland) Stephen Gallacher 2013
- (Republic of Ireland) Pádraig Harrington 2000, 2002, 2003, 2005
- (England) David Horsey 2011
- (England) David Howell 2000, 2003, 2005
- (Scotland) Scott Jamieson 2011, 2013
- (England) Simon Khan 2013
- (Scotland) Paul Lawrie 2000, 2002, 2003, 2013
- (England) David Lynn 2013
- (Northern Ireland) Graeme McDowell 2005, 2009
- (Republic of Ireland) Paul McGinley 2002, 2005
- (Northern Ireland) Rory McIlroy 2009
- (Scotland) Colin Montgomerie 2000, 2002, 2003, 2005, 2007
- (Scotland) Andrew Oldcorn 2002
- (Scotland) Gary Orr 2000
- (England) Ian Poulter 2003, 2005, 2011
- (Wales) Phillip Price 2000, 2003
- (England) Robert Rock 2009, 2011
- (England) Justin Rose 2003, 2007
- (England) Graeme Storm 2007
- (England) Anthony Wall 2009
- (Scotland) Marc Warren 2007, 2013
- (England) Steve Webster 2002, 2009
- (England) Lee Westwood 2000, 2002, 2003, 2011
- (England) Oliver Wilson 2007, 2009
- (England) Chris Wood 2009, 2013
- (Wales) Ian Woosnam 2000, 2002

=== Continental Europe ===
Miguel Ángel Jiménez was the only golfer to play in all eight Seve Trophy events on the Continental side.

- (Spain) Seve Ballesteros 2000, 2002, 2003, 2007
- (Denmark) Thomas Bjørn 2000, 2002, 2003, 2005, 2007, 2011, 2013
- (France) Grégory Bourdy 2013
- (Austria) Markus Brier 2007
- (Italy) Emanuele Canonica 2005
- (Germany) Alex Čejka 2000, 2002, 2003
- (Belgium) Nicolas Colsaerts 2011, 2013
- (Sweden) Niclas Fasth 2002, 2003, 2005
- (Spain) Gonzalo Fernández-Castaño 2007, 2009, 2013
- (Spain) Sergio García 2000, 2003
- (Spain) Ignacio Garrido 2003
- (Sweden) Mathias Grönberg 2002
- (Denmark) Anders Hansen 2009, 2011
- (Denmark) Søren Hansen 2007, 2009
- (Sweden) Peter Hanson 2005, 2007, 2009, 2011
- (France) Grégory Havret 2007
- (Finland) Mikko Ilonen 2007, 2013
- (Sweden) Freddie Jacobson 2003
- (France) Raphaël Jacquelin 2002, 2003, 2007, 2011
- (Spain) Miguel Ángel Jiménez 2000, 2002, 2003, 2005, 2007, 2009, 2011, 2013
- (Sweden) Robert Karlsson 2000, 2002, 2007, 2009
- (Denmark) Søren Kjeldsen 2009
- (Netherlands) Maarten Lafeber 2005
- (Germany) Bernhard Langer 2000
- (Spain) Pablo Larrazábal 2011
- (France) Thomas Levet 2002, 2005
- (Netherlands) Joost Luiten 2013
- (Italy) Matteo Manassero 2011, 2013
- (Italy) Francesco Molinari 2009, 2011, 2013
- (Sweden) Alex Norén 2011
- (Spain) José María Olazábal 2000, 2002, 2003, 2005
- (Denmark) Thorbjørn Olesen 2013
- (Spain) Álvaro Quirós 2009
- (France) Jean-François Remésy 2005
- (Sweden) Jarmo Sandelin 2000
- (Sweden) Henrik Stenson 2005, 2009
- (France) Jean van de Velde 2000

== See also ==
- Hero Cup
