= Wynyard Golf Club =

Golf club in County Durham, England

- Interactive map of Wynyard Golf Club
- 54.6262°N 1.3370°W

Club information
- Location: Wynyard, England
- Established: 1996
- Type: Public
- Tota holes: 18
- Tournaments: Seve Trophy

Wellington Course
- Designed by: Hawtree
- Par: 72
- Length: 6851 yards

Wynyard Golf Club is a golf club situated in the village of Wynyard near Sedgefield, County Durham, England. The course was built in 1996 alongside the building of the Wynyard Estates development and was designed by Hawtree.

The Wellington Course has been acknowledged by the European Tour as a high-quality golf course. As a result, Wynyard Golf Club was chosen to host the 2005 Seve Trophy between Great Britain and Ireland and Continental Europe. The trophy was won 16½–11½ by Great Britain and Ireland.

The course has also hosted one of the qualifying stages for the European Tour (PQ1). The highest finishers moved on to the next stage before earning the tour cards for the next year. Also, it has hosted Challenge Tour events alongside local charity events.
