= John Burton (golfer) =

English golfer (1903–1973)

Personal information
- Nationality: England
- Born: 6 December 1903 Darwen, Lancashire, England
- Died: 19 October 1973 (aged 69) Southport, Lancashire, England

Career
- Sport: Golf
- Status: Professional
- Professional wins: 3

Best results in major championships
- Masters Tournament: DNP
- PGA Championship: DNP
- U.S. Open: DNP
- The Open Championship: 12th: 1934

John Burton (6 December 1903 – 19 October 1973) was an English professional golfer. He was the older brother of Dick Burton, the winner of the 1939 Open Championship.

Burton won the 1933 Penfold-Porthcawl Tournament by two strokes from Reg Whitcombe, winning the first prize of £150. In 1946 he was runner-up in the News Chronicle Tournament, a stroke behind Norman Von Nida.

Burton won the 1949 Penfold Tournament in partnership with Max Faulkner, beating his brother Dick and Flory Van Donck in the final. Later in the year he tied with Charlie Ward in the Dunlop Masters but lost the 36-hole playoff by a single shot.

In April 1957, at the age of 53, he won the Teacher Senior Professional Championship, the first PGA Seniors Championship, winning the first prize of £250. In June he played Al Watrous for the Teachers International Senior Professional Championship, but lost 8&6 in the 36-hole match.

The Liverpool Golf Alliance play for the "John Burton Trophy". The trophy was presented to the Alliance in 1974 following his death.

== Tournament wins ==
- 1933 Penfold-Porthcawl Tournament
- 1949 Penfold Tournament (with Max Faulkner)
- 1957 PGA Seniors Championship

== Results in major championships ==
Tournament	1931	1932	1933	1934	1935	1936	1937	1938	1939
The Open Championship	T53	T56		12			T29		CUT

Tournament	1940	1941	1942	1943	1944	1945	1946	1947	1948	1949
The Open Championship	NT	NT	NT	NT	NT	NT		24		

Tournament	1950	1951	1952	1953	1954	1955	1956	1957	1958	1959	1960	1961
The Open Championship				49	CUT	T35	CUT	CUT	CUT			CUT

Note: Burton only played in The Open Championship.

Did not play

CUT = missed the half-way cut
"T" indicates a tie for a place

== Team appearances ==
- England–Ireland Professional Match (representing England): 1933 (winners)
