= Emanuele Canonica =

Italian professional golfer

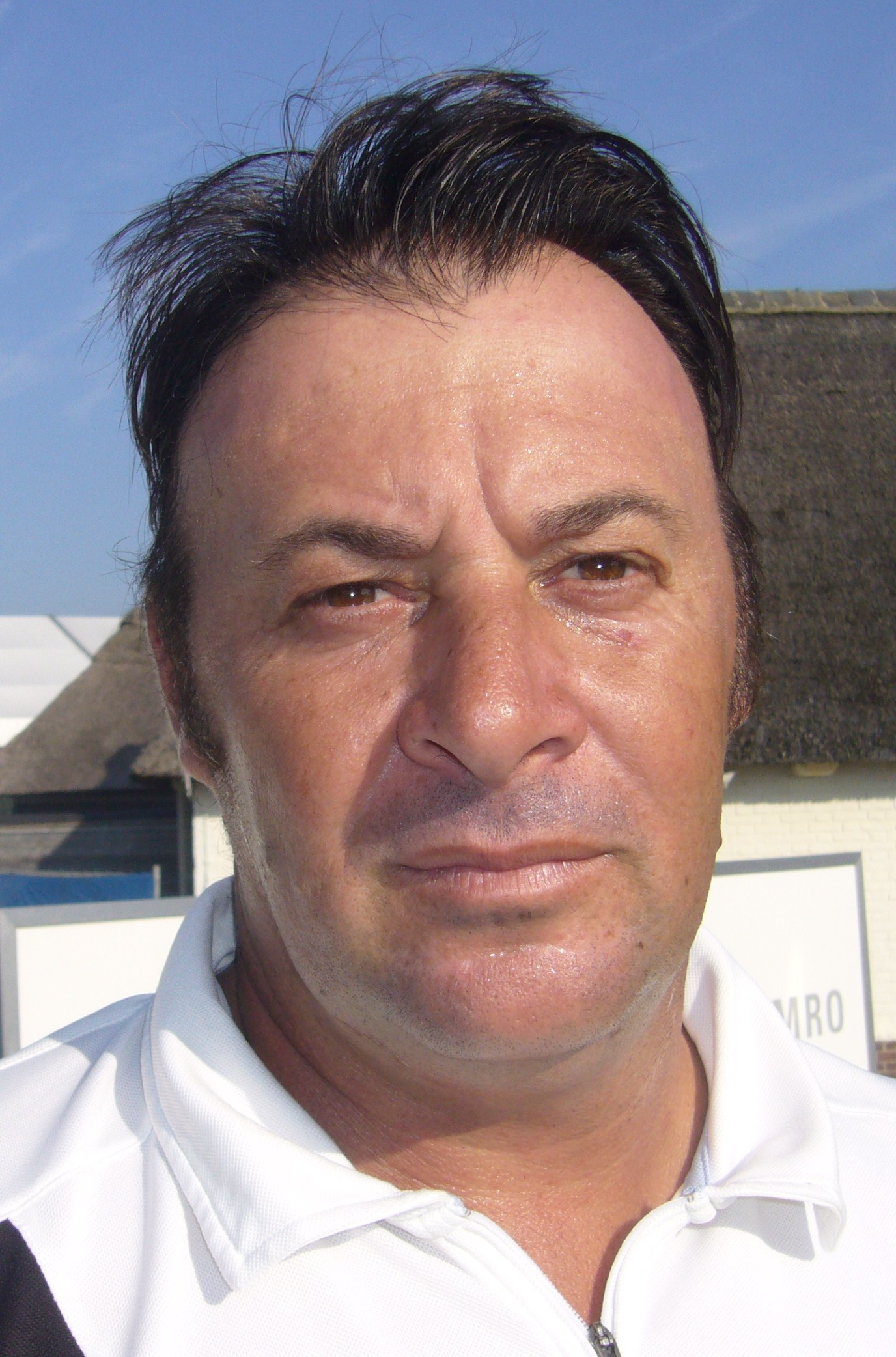

Personal information
- Full name: Emanuele Canonica
- Nationality: Italy
- Born: 7 January 1971 (age 55) Moncalieri, Italy
- Height: 1.65 m (5 ft 5 in)

Career
- Sport: Golf
- Turned professional: 1991
- Current tour: European Senior Tour
- Former tours: PGA Tour; European Tour
- Professional wins: 1

Number of wins by tour
- European Tour: 1

Emanuele Canonica (born 7 January 1971) is an Italian professional golfer.

== Early life and amateur career ==
Canonica was born at Moncalieri in the province of Turin in the Piedmont region. He won the Italian National Juniors Championship in 1990 and was part of the gold medal winning Italian team at the European Youths' Team Championship that year. He was also part of the Italian team finishing second at the 1991 European Amateur Team Championship in Madrid, Spain. He turned professional later in 1991.

== Professional career ==
Having played in several Challenge Tour events, Canonica qualified for the 1995 European Tour at the 1994 qualifying school. He initially struggled to keep his tour card, finishing 117th on the Order of Merit in each of his first two seasons. 121st place the following year meant limited playing opportunities in 1998, but after regaining full playing status via qualifying school his performances improved, finishing 70th on the money list in 1999 and then a career best 27th in 2000.

A disappointing 2001, where he played just 11 events and finished 132nd on the money list, meant another season with fewer tournament invitations in 2002. He made the most of the invites he did receive with three top 10 finishes, including the Canarias Open de España where he was joint runner up, to end the season in 52nd place on the Order of Merit and regain his European Tour card. In 2005 he won for the first time on the European Tour at the Johnnie Walker Championship at Gleneagles, securing his place on tour for two years.

Despite his relatively small stature, Canonica has topped the European Tour driving distance statistics several times. In April 2009, he caddied for José María Olazábal at the Masters Tournament.

== Professional wins (1) ==
=== European Tour wins (1) ===
No.	Date	Tournament	Winning score	Margin of victory	Runners-up
1	7 Aug 2005	Johnnie Walker Championship at Gleneagles	−7 (70-71-69-71=281)	2 strokes	(Belgium) Nicolas Colsaerts, (Wales) Bradley Dredge, (England) Barry Lane, (England) David Lynn

== Team appearances ==
Amateur

- European Youths' Team Championship (representing Italy): 1990 (winners)
- European Amateur Team Championship (representing Italy): 1991

Professional

- Alfred Dunhill Cup (representing Italy): 1996, 1999
- World Cup (representing Italy): 1999, 2006
- Seve Trophy (representing Continental Europe): 2005

== See also ==
- 2000 PGA Tour Qualifying School graduates
