= Di Stewart =

British television presenter

Diana Stewart (born 18 January 1979) is an English television presenter, best known for her work for Sky Sports.

Stewart was born in Salford, Greater Manchester and educated at Stockport Grammar School. She then went to the University of Newcastle upon Tyne, where she studied German. While at university she played golf and netball.

Stewart's media career began when she joined Galaxy Radio as part of their ground crew. She later joined Sky Sports as a runner before becoming one of the presenters on the Sky Sports News channel. In 2007, Sky launched a dedicated golf programme and Stewart was selected to be one the show's host presenters.

Stewart has also appeared on other programmes, including Sky3's More Big Ideas, which is shown after the Sky1 show The Big Idea, in which she speaks to the winner and losers of the show. In May 2009, she appeared in a series of adverts for Titleist golf balls alongside ESPN's Scott Van Pelt. Di also co-presents Game Changers on Sky 1 on Saturday mornings. Stewart has also appeared in two episodes of the Raidió Teilifís Éireann and BBC Scotland sitcom Mrs. Brown's Boys as the character Mrs. Annette Curtain.

Stewart started playing golf aged six and was soon representing Cheshire Girls' and Cheshire Ladies' teams. At 17 years old she had a handicap of 6. She played in the amateur teams during the Dunhill Links Championship in 2005. She has appeared in a Titleist advertising campaign alongside Scott Van Pelt.

Stewart is a former girlfriend of England rugby player Jonny Wilkinson. She married European Tour golfer, Nick Dougherty on New Year's Eve 2010. They got divorced in 2023.
