= Johnny Bulla =

American professional golfer (1914–2003)

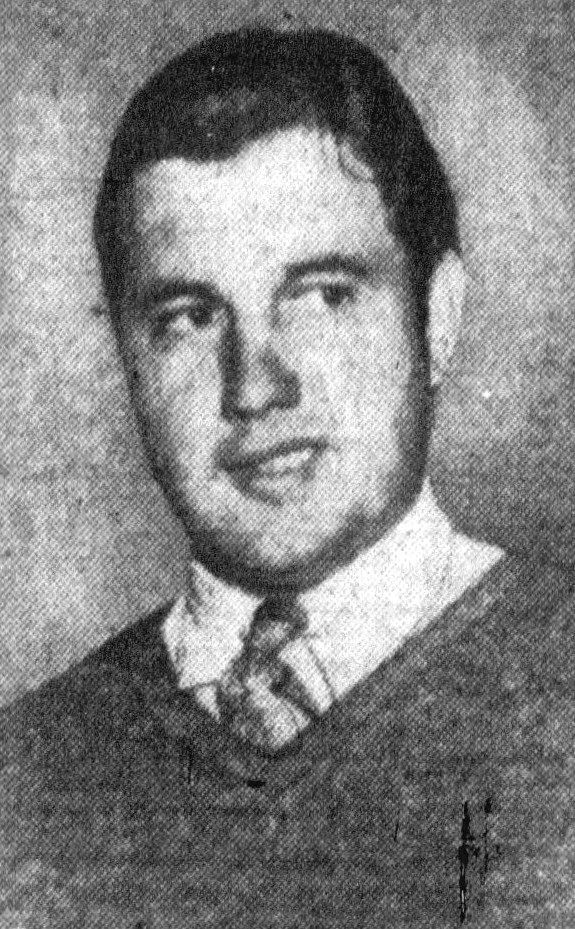
- Bulla, circa 1950

Personal information
- Full name: John Guthrie Bulla
- Nationality: United States
- Born: June 2, 1914 Newell, West Virginia, U.S.
- Died: December 7, 2003 (aged 89) Phoenix, Arizona, U.S.

Career
- Sport: Golf
- Status: Professional
- Former tour: PGA Tour
- Professional wins: 8

Number of wins by tour
- PGA Tour: 1
- Other: 7

Best results in major championships
- Masters Tournament: T2: 1949
- PGA Championship: T5: 1948, 1951
- U.S. Open: T3: 1941
- The Open Championship: 2nd/T2: 1939, 1946

John Guthrie Bulla (June 2, 1914 – December 7, 2003) was an American professional golfer.

== Early life ==
Bulla was born in Newell, West Virginia.

== Professional career ==
Bulla played on what is now called the PGA Tour. His only win was at the 1941 Los Angeles Open. Bulla was the first to endorse merchandise sold outside the golf pro shop. He won the L.A. Open in 1941 with a discount golf ball, which sold for a quarter at Walgreens.

Bulla had extraordinary success at the major golf championships. He finished runner-up three times in the majors, including twice to Sam Snead; at the British Open in 1946 and the Masters in 1949. Bulla's greatest moment might have been the British Open in 1939 at St Andrews. In miserable conditions, he drove flawlessly and never missed a fairway. The driver is on display in the Royal & Ancient Golf Club Museum, but his name is missing from the Claret Jug. Bulla finished early that day and was the leader in the clubhouse, which he held until Dick Burton, in the final group, caught him and won with a birdie on the last hole. Although Bulla never won a major, he finished in the top-10 twelve times; twice each in the Masters and PGA Championship and four times each at the British Open and U.S. Open.

=== Pilot career ===
Bulla was a private pilot and before World War II, he flew himself to various tournaments. He was later a commercial pilot with Eastern Airlines, and shortly after the war, Bulla and several other touring pros bought a C-47 cargo plane from the U.S. Army Air Forces to fly themselves and their wives to golf tournaments, with Bulla at the controls. He then co-founded Arizona Airways, which became Frontier Airlines in 1950.

== Awards and honors ==
In 2000, the Carolinas Golf Reporters Association inducted Bulla into the Carolinas Golf Hall of Fame

== Professional wins (8) ==
=== PGA Tour wins (1) ===
- 1941 Los Angeles Open

=== Other wins (7) ===
- 1947 Arizona Open
- 1950 Arizona Open
- 1951 Pennsylvania Open Championship, Arizona Open
- 1958 Southern California PGA Championship, Arizona Open
- 1959 Arizona Open

== Results in major championships ==
Tournament	1935	1936	1937	1938	1939
Masters Tournament					
U.S. Open	63	T45			6
The Open Championship					2
PGA Championship					

Tournament	1940	1941	1942	1943	1944	1945	1946	1947	1948	1949
Masters Tournament	T21	39		NT	NT	NT	T16	13	T13	T2
U.S. Open	DQ	T3	NT	NT	NT	NT	T22	T35	T8	T14
The Open Championship	NT	NT	NT	NT	NT	NT	T2	T6	T7	27
PGA Championship				NT				R32	QF	R32

Tournament	1950	1951	1952	1953	1954	1955	1956	1957	1958	1959
Masters Tournament	31	T8	DQ	T51				CUT		
U.S. Open	T12	52	4	T33	CUT	DQ	T24			
The Open Championship	T14					T37				
PGA Championship		QF								CUT

Tournament	1960	1961	1962	1963	1964	1965	1966	1967	1968	1969
Masters Tournament										
U.S. Open	CUT						T54			
The Open Championship					CUT					
PGA Championship		T57	CUT		CUT		CUT	63	CUT	CUT

Top 10
Did not play

NT = no tournament
DQ = disqualified
CUT = missed the half-way cut (3rd round cut in 1959 PGA Championship)
R32, R16, QF, SF = round in which player lost in PGA Championship match play
"T" indicates a tie for a place

=== Summary ===
Tournament	Wins	2nd	3rd	Top-5	Top-10	Top-25	Events	Cuts made
Masters Tournament	0	1	0	1	2	6	11	9
U.S. Open	0	0	1	2	4	8	18	14
The Open Championship	0	2	0	2	4	5	8	7
PGA Championship	0	0	0	2	2	4	11	6
Totals	0	3	1	7	12	23	48	36

- Most consecutive cuts made – 23 (1941 Masters – 1951 PGA)
- Longest streak of top-10s – 4 (1948 U.S. Open – 1949 Masters)
