= Whitchurch Golf Club =

Golf club in Cardiff, Wales

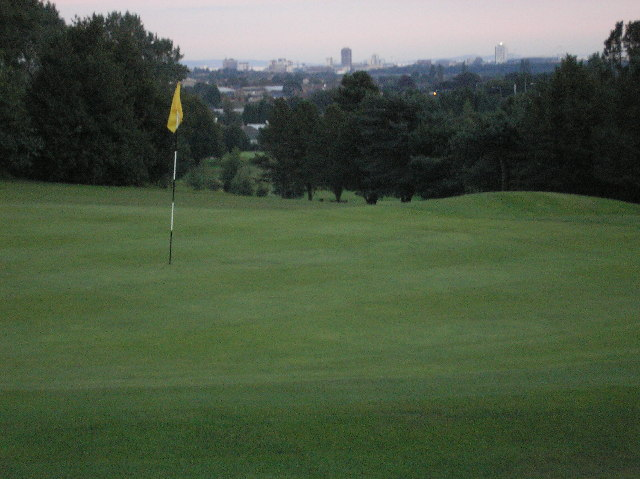

- Whitchurch (Cardiff) Golf Club within Wales
- 51.52201°N 3.157232°W

Club information
- Location: Cardiff, Wales
- Established: 24 July 1914
- Type: Golf Club
- Tota holes: 18
- Website: whitchurchcardiffgolfclub.co.uk
- Par: 71
- Length: 6212 yards

Whitchurch Golf Club (Welsh: Clwb Golff Yr Eglwys Newydd) is a golf club based in Rhiwbina in Cardiff, Wales. It is an 18-hole parkland course. The club record is held by Ian Woosnam with a par of 62. In 2005, 2006, and 2008 the club won the award for the best golf club in Wales in Bloom and by “Welsh Club Golfer” as being “the best inland golf course in Wales”. During World War II, a part of the course was used to grow vegetables. The club welcomes visitors and society golf.

The club celebrated its centenary in July 2014. The celebration was attended by the likes of Peter Alliss.
