= Syd Easterbrook =

English golfer (1905–1975)

Personal information
- Full name: Sydney John Philip Easterbrook
- Nationality: England
- Born: 22 January 1905 Sidmouth, Devon, England
- Died: 30 January 1975 (aged 70) Sidmouth, Devon, England

Career
- Sport: Golf
- Status: Professional
- Professional wins: 3

Best results in major championships
- Masters Tournament: DNP
- PGA Championship: DNP
- U.S. Open: WD: 1931
- The Open Championship: T3: 1933

Sydney John Philip Easterbrook (22 January 1905 – 30 January 1975) was an English professional golfer.

== Early life ==
In 1905, Easterbrook was born. He had two brothers, Algy (1899–1960) and Cyril (1901–1975) who were also golfers.

== Professional career ==
Easterbrook won the Irish Open in 1934 and was a member of the Great Britain Ryder Cup team in 1931 and 1933. In 1933, he won the deciding match for Great Britain by beating Denny Shute on the final hole.

== Professional wins ==
This list may be incomplete

- 1934 Irish Open, Dunlop-West of England Tournament
- 1939 West of England Professional Championship

== Results in major championships ==
Tournament	1926	1927	1928	1929	1930	1931	1932	1933	1934	1935	1936	1937	1938	1939
U.S. Open						WD								
The Open Championship	WD		CUT			T40	T13	T3	T31	T7	T34		CUT	T20

Note: Easterbrook only played in The U.S. Open and The Open Championship.

Top 10
Did not play

WD = withdrew
CUT = missed the half-way cut
"T" indicates a tie for a place

== Team appearances ==
- Ryder Cup (representing Great Britain): 1931, 1933 (winners)
- Seniors vs Juniors (representing the Juniors): 1928
- England–Scotland Professional Match (representing England): 1932 (winners), 1933 (winners), 1934 (winners), 1935 (winners), 1938 (winners)
- England–Ireland Professional Match (representing England): 1933 (winners)
