= County Louth Golf Club =

Golf course in County Louth, Ireland

- Location within Ireland
- 53°44′31.42″N 6°15′15.12″W

Club information
- Location: Baltray, County Louth, Ireland
- Established: 1938
- Tournaments: Irish Open 2004 and 2009
- Website: http://www.countylouthgolfclub.com
- Designed by: Tom Simpson
- Par: 72
- Length: 7,031 yards (6,429 m)

County Louth Golf Club is a links golf course located in the village of Baltray, County Louth in Ireland. It is situated approximately 4 miles from the town of Drogheda.

The Irish Open professional golf tournament which is part of the PGA European Tour has been held there on two occasions, in 2004 and 2009.

The current course was designed in 1938 by Tom Simpson and is laid out over 190 acres (77 ha) of land. The 18-hole course par score is 72 with a course length of 7031 yards.
