= Prenton Golf Club =

Golf club in Merseyside, England

- Location within Merseyside
- 53.3647°N 3.0411°W

Club information
- Location: Prenton, Merseyside, England
- Established: 1905
- Type: Parkland
- Operator: Gareth Irwin
- Tota holes: 18
- Website: www.prentongolfclub.co.uk
- Designed by: James Braid

Prenton Golf Club is a golf club to the south of Prenton, Merseyside, England. Prenton Golf Club was established in 1905 and was designed by the famous golf architect of his time James Braid. The course is a scenic parkland course of 6,457 yards and has held many a Cheshire Union County fixture and tournament over its illustrious history. The course has views to the west across the Wirral Peninsula with the Welsh mountains in the distance – and yet it is located close to the cities of Liverpool and Chester.
