= 1989 Swedish Golf Tour =

Golf tour season

1989 Swedish Golf Tour season
- Duration: 19 May 1989 – 24 September 1989
- Number of official events: 14
- Order of Merit: (Sweden) Magnus Sunesson

The 1989 Swedish Golf Tour was the sixth season of the Swedish Golf Tour, the main professional golf tour in Sweden since it was formed in 1984, with most tournaments being incorporated into the Challenge Tour between 1989 and 1998.

== Schedule ==
The following table lists official events during the 1989 season.

Date	Tournament	Location	Purse (SKr)	Winner (Note: The number in brackets after each winner's name is the number of Swedish Golf Tour events they had won up to and including that tournament. As most Swedish Golf Tour events are incorporated into the Challenge Tour schedules, details of these wins are displayed there instead.)	Main tour (Note: CHA − Challenge Tour.)
21 May	Naturgas Open	Skåne	250,000	(England) Jeff Hall	CHA
28 May	Ramlösa Open	Västergötland	300,000	(Germany) Heinz-Peter Thül	CHA
4 Jun	Nescafé Cup	Skåne	300,000	(Sweden) Thomas Nilsson	CHA
11 Jun	Teleannons Grand Prix	Skåne	500,000	(Sweden) Mats Lanner	CHA
18 Jun	Stiga Open	Småland	250,000	(Sweden) Thomas Nilsson	CHA
2 Jul	Volvo Albatross	Småland	400,000	(Sweden) Magnus Sunesson	CHA
9 Jul	Wermland Open	Värmland	400,000	(Sweden) Anders Gillner	CHA
16 Jul	Scandinavian Tipo Trophy	Finland	250,000	(Denmark) René Michelsen	CHA
30 Jul	SM Match Play	Uppland	325,000	(Sweden) Magnus Grankvist	CHA
13 Aug	Gevalia Open	Gästrikland	400,000	(Sweden) Mats Lanner	CHA
27 Aug	Esab Open	Halland	250,000	(Sweden) Carl-Magnus Strömberg	CHA
10 Sep	Västerås Kentab Open	Västmanland	325,000	(Sweden) Clas Hultman	CHA
17 Sep	SI Aragon Open	Närke	400,000	(Sweden) Anders Gillner	CHA
24 Sep	Länsförsäkringar Open	Halland	600,000	(Sweden) Leif Hederström	CHA

== Order of Merit ==
The Order of Merit was titled as the Diners Club Order of Merit and was based on prize money won during the season, calculated in Swedish krona.

Position	Player	Prize money (SKr)
1	(Sweden) Magnus Sunesson	245,250
2	(Sweden) Anders Gillner	203,550
3	(Sweden) Mats Lanner	163,300
4	(Sweden) Magnus Grankvist	160,100
5	(Sweden) Thomas Nilsson	157,750

== See also ==
- 1989 Swedish Golf Tour (women)
