= Magnus Sunesson =

Swedish professional golfer

Personal information
- Full name: Arvid Magnus Sunesson
- Nationality: Sweden
- Born: 26 March 1964 (age 62) Landskrona, Sweden
- Spouse: Julie Sunesson

Career
- Sport: Golf
- Turned professional: 1982
- Former tour: European Tour (1987–1994)
- Professional wins: 5

Number of wins by tour
- Challenge Tour: 1
- Other: 4

Best results in major championships
- Masters Tournament: DNP
- PGA Championship: DNP
- U.S. Open: DNP
- The Open Championship: T12: 1991

Achievements and awards
- Swedish Golf Tour Order of Merit winner: 1989

Arvid Magnus Sunesson (born 26 March 1964) is a Swedish professional golfer who played on the European Tour between 1987 and 1994.

== Amateur career ==
Sunesson won the unofficial 1978 Swedish Youth Championship, Colgate Cup, at his age level (14 years old). The year after, his one year younger clubmate at Landskrona Golf Club, Magnus Persson, won the same category and the two of them was considered among the most promising young golfers in the country at the time.

He represented the Continent of Europe at the 1981 Jacques Léglise Trophy at Gullane Golf Club, East Lothian, Scotland, and Sweden at the 1982 European Youths' Team Championship at Racing Club de La Boulie, Paris, France, both times with Magnus Persson among his teammates.

== Professional career ==
He turned professional in 1982 and played on the Swedish Golf Tour, where he won four tournaments, beating Mats Lanner by five strokes at the 1984 Maggi Cup and Anders Forsbrand at the 1988 Teleannons Grand Prix. In 1989 he won the Swedish Golf Tour Order of Merit, ahead of Anders Gillner and Mats Lanner.

He was part of the winning Swedish team at the 1986 Europcar Cup together with Anders Forsbrand, Per-Arne Brostedt and Magnus Grankvist.

Joining the European Tour in 1987, he played seven seasons on the tour, 1987–1988 and 1990–1994, collecting €365,415 in winnings. He recorded six top-10 finishes, including a fourth at the 1990 Cepsa Madrid Open at Real Club de la Puerta de Hierro, three strokes behind Bernhard Langer, and a T4 at the 1992 Volvo PGA Championship at Wentworth Golf Club in Surrey, England.

His best result at a major golf championship was a tie for 12th at the 1991 Open Championship at Royal Birkdale Golf Club. After final rounds of 68 and 67 he found himself one stroke behind the T9 trio of Seve Ballesteros, Bernhard Langer and Greg Norman, and 8 strokes behind winner Ian Baker-Finch who finished with rounds of 64 and 66.

== Later career ==
After retiring from tour, Sunesson became a PGA Club Professional and served as head pro at Royal Drottningholm Golf Club, outside Stockholm, 1995–1998. He was coach for the Swedish National Team at the Swedish Golf Federation 1995–2002, along with coaching the Hello Sweden Future Team 1999–2004 which included Henrik Stenson, Peter Hanson and Christian Nilsson.

From 2007 to 2012, he was broadcaster for Viasat Golf covering the European Tour and some PGA Tour events such as the U.S. Open.

He has also briefly served as assistant greenskeeper at international tournament courses Vasatorp GC and Barsebäck Golf & Country Club, as well as General Manager at Rya GC.

In 2014 Sunesson started a career in golf course design. Up until 2024 he was involved in improving 57 courses, including Mölle GK and Lunds Akademiska GK.

He won the Swedish Hickory Championship in 2015 ahead of Magnus Persson Atlevi, and successfully defended the title in 2016.

== Professional wins (5) ==
=== Challenge Tour wins (1) ===
| No. | Date | Tournament | Winning score | Margin of victory | Runner-up |
|---|---|---|---|---|---|
| 1 | 2 Jul 1989 | Volvo Albatross | −7 (71-72-66=209) | Playoff | (Denmark) Ole Eskildsen |

Challenge Tour playoff record (1–0)

| No. | Year | Tournament | Opponent | Result |
|---|---|---|---|---|
| 1 | 1989 | Volvo Albatross | (Denmark) Ole Eskildsen | Won with birdie on first extra hole |
| 2 | 1991 | Länsförsäkringar Open | (Sweden) Johan Ryström | Lost to par on first extra hole |

=== Swedish Golf Tour wins (3) ===
| No. | Date | Tournament | Winning score | Margin of victory | Runner-up |
|---|---|---|---|---|---|
| 1 | 16 Jun 1984 | Maggi Cup | +1 (75-72-71-71=289) | 5 strokes | (Sweden) Mats Lanner |
| 2 | 15 Jun 1986 | Stiab Grand Prix | 19 holes | | (Republic of Ireland) Eamonn Darcy |
| 3 | 12 Jun 1988 | Teleannons Grand Prix (2) | SKr 95,000 | SKr 56,000 | (Sweden) Anders Forsbrand |

=== Other wins (1) ===
- 2005 Skåne Open

== Results in major championships ==
| Tournament | 1990 | 1991 | 1992 | 1993 | 1994 |
|---|---|---|---|---|---|
| The Open Championship | | T12 | CUT | T65 | |

Note: Sunesson only played in The Open Championship.

Did not play

CUT = missed the half-way cut
"T" = tied

== Team appearances ==
Amateur

- European Boys' Team Championship (representing Sweden): 1980
- Jacques Léglise Trophy (representing the Continent of Europe): 1981
- European Youths' Team Championship (representing Sweden): 1982

Professional

- Europcar Cup (representing Sweden): 1986 (winners)
