= Leonard Crawley =

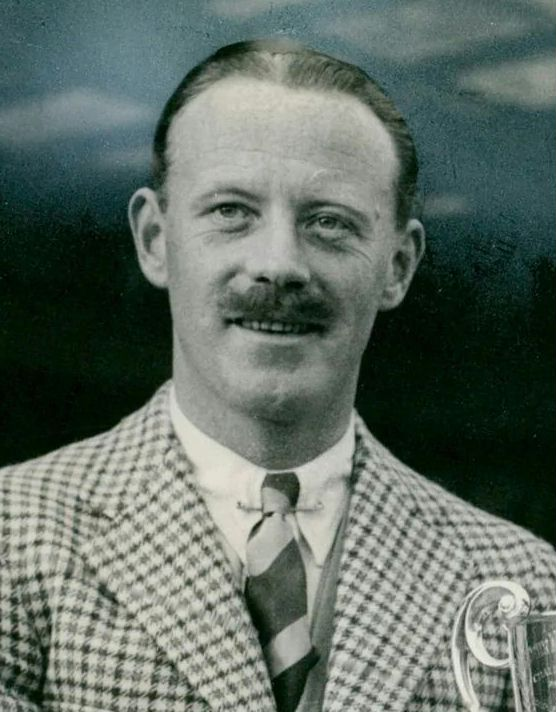

Personal information
- Full name: Leonard George Crawley
- Born: 26 July 1903; Nacton, Suffolk, England
- Died: 9 July 1981 (aged 77); Worlington Lodge, Suffolk, England
- Batting: Right-handed
- Bowling: Right arm fast / occ. WK

Domestic team information
- Years: Team
- 1922–1923: Worcestershire
- 1923–1925: Cambridge University
- 1925/26–1939: Marylebone Cricket Club (MCC)
- 1926–1936: Essex

Career statistics
Competition	FC
Matches	109
Runs scored	5,227
Batting average	31.11
100s/50s	8/22
Top score	222
Balls bowled	102
Wickets	0
Bowling average	-
5 wickets in innings	0
10 wickets in match	0
Best bowling	-
Catches/stumpings	42/0
- Source: CricketArchive, 9 July 2008

Leonard George Crawley (26 July 1903 – 9 July 1981) was an English sportsman and later journalist. He was most accomplished at golf and cricket, but also played tennis to a very high standard and was an excellent ice-skater, a good rackets player and a fine shot.

== Golf ==
Crawley was a very accomplished golfer, playing four times in the Walker Cup and winning the English Amateur in 1931, and after retiring from playing sport, he spent a quarter of a century as golf correspondent for the Daily Telegraph.

As correspondent for the Daily Telegraph newspaper, Crawley was the only British journalist present at Hazeltine National Golf Club in 1970 when Tony Jacklin became the first Briton to win the U.S. Open since 1924. Crawley accompanied Jacklin during the tournament and became increasingly conscious of his responsibility as Jacklin improved his lead with each passing day. "By God, I have all England at my feet" he was heard to say.

He played for Cambridge University v Oxford University in 1925. He won the English Amateur Championship in 1931, and was a beaten finalist (at 37th) in 1934 and 1937. Won the Presidents Putter in 1932, 1947, 1951 and 1952. Won the Worplesdon Mixed Foursomes in 1937 with Molly Heppel and in 1949 and 1950 with Frances Stephens Won the London Amateur Foursomes with Philip Scrutton in 1952. Won the Berkshire Trophy in 1948. Runner-up in the French Open in 1937. Played for Great Britain & Ireland in the Walker Cup in 1932, 1934, 1938, and 1947. Played for England in the Home International Matches in 1931-32-33-34-36-37-46-47-48-49. Won numerous amateur events in the 1930s and 1940s and many medals in the Royal and Ancient Golf club's Spring and Autumn meetings. Was a member of numerous Harrovian winning Halford Hewitt sides. In 1932 he received an enquiry as to his availability to go to Australia on the M.C.C. Tour (the Bodyline Series) but had to decline as he had already been selected for the Walker Cup match at Brookline, at which he was the only British player to score a point.

== Cricket ==
After some excellent performances for the Harrow XI, including a century against Eton at Lord's in 1921, Crawley made his first-class debut for Worcestershire against Somerset in early August 1922, even before he had appeared for Cambridge. Although he did little in that game, against Glamorgan a few days later he – named as captain – made 91 out of 198 in Worcestershire's first innings.

In 1923 Crawley appeared regularly for Cambridge, fitting his Worcestershire appearances around those for the university, and he had a very successful year, ending with 801 first-class runs (his highest season's aggregate) at an average of 44.50. His three games for Worcestershire in August included his maiden hundred: a knock of 161 against Northamptonshire at Worcester. In this game, he shared a third-wicket stand of 304 with William Fox; however, Marylebone Cricket Club (MCC) declared both Crawley and Fox's qualifications to play for the county invalid. Fox was to play on for Worcestershire after a two-season break, but Crawley left the county at the end of the summer.

Crawley went with MCC to the Caribbean in the winter of 1925–26, although as West Indies had yet to attain Test status this was not considered a major tour, and he played no first-class games. Upon his return he joined Essex, with whom he remained until the end of his county career. Although he never turned out for more than a few games each summer, he produced some notable feats of batting, such as the second-innings 176 not out he hit, under pressure of time, to beat Sussex in 1927.

Crawley's highest score of 222 was made in 1928 against Glamorgan, although this was a drawn game in which the teams' combined first innings approached a thousand. A more impressive feat came in July 1936 (not 1937 as his Wisden obituary states) when he played his first match of the season (again against Glamorgan). In this game, he made 118 in an innings where no other batsman passed 18. The effort involved, however, meant that he was unable to bat in the second innings. This was in fact to be the last century of his career, as he effectively retired at the end of the season, save only for one final outing, for MCC against Cambridge, in 1939.

A number of Crawley's relatives played first-class cricket: the most significant of these was his cousin Aidan Crawley, who played 87 first-class matches, mostly between 1927 and 1932.

== Golf team appearances ==
Amateur

- Walker Cup (representing Great Britain & Ireland): 1932, 1934, 1938 (winners), 1947
- England–Scotland Amateur Match (representing England): 1931
- England–Ireland Amateur Match (representing England): 1931 (winners)
