= Bill Laidlaw =

Scottish golfer

Personal information
- Nationality: Scotland
- Born: 1914 Perth, Scotland
- Died: 20 October 1941 (aged 27) Bremen, Nazi Germany

Career
- Sport: Golf
- Turned professional: 1932
- Professional wins: 1

Best results in major championships
- Masters Tournament: DNP
- PGA Championship: DNP
- U.S. Open: DNP
- The Open Championship: T7: 1937

William Laidlaw (1914 – 20 October 1941) was a Scottish professional golfer. He finished tied for 7th place in the 1937 Open Championship and won the 1938 Daily Mirror Assistants' Tournament. He was killed during an RAF bombing raid on Bremen, aged 27.

== Golf career ==
Laidlaw was an assistant professional at Gleneagles Hotel (from 1932) and Malden (from 1934) and then with Henry Cotton at Ashridge Golf Club from the start of 1937. He became a full professional at West Herts Golf Club in early 1939.

Laidlaw's big win was in the 1938 Daily Mirror Assistants' Tournament at Blackpool North Shore. He scored 289 for the 72 holes and won by 9 strokes from Alan Waters and Geoff White. Later in 1938 he was second in the Czechoslovak Open, although 11 strokes behind the winner, Henry Cotton.

== Death ==
Pilot Officer Laidlaw was killed during an RAF raid on the night of 20/21 October 1941. Laidlaw was in No. 50 Squadron RAF and was involved in a raid on Bremen. He had left RAF Swinderby in a Handley Page Hampden.

Laidlaw married Pamela Mary Tanner, a singer, in 1940. They had a son, William, who was born in 1942.

== Tournament wins ==
- 1938 Daily Mirror Assistants' Tournament

== Results in major championships ==
Tournament	1934	1935	1936	1937	1938
The Open Championship	T35	T18		T7	CUT

Note: Laidlaw only played in The Open Championship.

Top 10
Did not play

CUT = missed the half-way cut
"T" indicates a tie for a place

== Team appearances ==
- England–Scotland Professional Match (representing Scotland): 1935, 1936, 1938
- Triangular Professional Tournament (representing Scotland): 1937 (winners)
