= Filip Mrůzek =

Czech professional golfer (born 1991)

Personal information
- Nationality: Czech Republic
- Born: 22 September 1991 (age 35) Mariánské Lázně, Czechoslovakia
- Height: 175 cm (5 ft 9 in)

Career
- Sport: Golf
- Turned professional: 2010
- Current tour: Challenge Tour
- Former tours: Pro Golf Tour; MENA Golf Tour
- Professional wins: 7

Number of wins by tour
- Challenge Tour: 1
- Other: 6

Filip Mrůzek (born 22 September 1991) is a Czech professional golfer and Challenge Tour player. He won the 2026 Interwetten Open.

== Career ==
Mrůzek was born in Mariánské Lázně and has been attached to Royal Golf Club Mariánské Lázně. He turned professional in August 2010 and made his European Tour debut at the 2010 Czech Open. After the tournament lost European Tour sanctioning he won the event a record four times between 2015 and 2024.

Mrůzek joined the Pro Golf Tour in 2014, and was runner-up at the Castanea Resort Open in Germany his rookie season. In 2025, he recorded two victories and finished 6th in the Order of Merit.

He joined the Challenge Tour in 2017, after earning status at Q-School. His breakthrough came in 2026 when he won the Interwetten Open in Austria, a stroke ahead of Louis Albertse from South Africa.

Mrůzek played on the 2022–23 MENA Tour, where he finished 4th twice.

== Professional wins (7) ==
=== Challenge Tour wins (1) ===
No.	Date	Tournament	Winning score	Margin of victory	Runner-up
1	14 Jun 2026	Interwetten Open	−18 (65-65-63-65=258)	1 stroke	(South Africa) Louis Albertse

=== Pro Golf Tour wins (2) ===
No.	Date	Tournament	Winning score	Margin of victory	Runner-up
1	18 Mar 2025	Red Sea Egyptian Classic	−21 (65-67-63=195)	5 strokes	(Egypt) Issa Abou El Ela (a)
2	8 May 2025	Raiffeisen Pro Golf Tour St. Pölten	−21 (62-67-66=195)	1 stroke	(Austria) Bernard Neumayer

=== Czech PGA Tour wins (4) ===
No.	Date	Tournament	Winning score	Margin of victory	Runner-up
1	6 Sep 2015	WGM Czech Open	−6 (68-71-71-72=282)	1 stroke	(Czech Republic) Ondřej Lieser
2	18 Aug 2018	WGM Czech Open (2)	−22 (71-65-62-68=266)	1 stroke	(Portugal) Tiago Cruz
3	15 Aug 2021	GolfAdvisor.golf Czech Open (3)	−24 (68-64-67-65=264)	3 strokes	(Czech Republic) Matěj Bača
4	25 Aug 2024	Czech Open (4)	−32 (61-65-64-62=252)	7 strokes	(Slovakia) Jakub Hrinda
