= 1993 Volvo PGA Championship =

Tournament information
- Dates: 28–31 May 1993
- Location: Virginia Water, Surrey, England; 51.40°N 0.59°W
- Courses: Wentworth Club; West Course
- Tour: European Tour

Statistics
- Par: 72
- Field: 150 players, 66 after cut
- Cut: 145 (+1)
- Prize fund: €701,050
- Winner's share: €186,662

Champion
- (Germany) Bernhard Langer
- 274 (−14)

Location map
- Location in England Location in Surrey

The 1993 Volvo PGA Championship was the 39th edition of the Volvo PGA Championship, an annual professional golf tournament on the European Tour. It was held 28–31 May at the West Course of Wentworth Club in Virginia Water, Surrey, England, a suburb southwest of London.

Bernhard Langer won his second Volvo PGA Championship with a final-round 68, beating the chasing pack by six shots.

== Round summaries ==
=== First round ===
Friday, 28 May 1993

Place	Player	Score	To par
1	(England) Gary Evans	66	−6
2	(Sweden) Magnus Sunesson	67	−5
T3	(South Africa) De Wet Basson	68	−4
T3	(Sweden) Mats Hallberg	68	−4
T3	(England) Mark James	68	−4
T3	(Canada) Danny Mijovic	68	−4
T3	(Australia) Peter O'Malley	68	−4
T3	(Northern Ireland) Ronan Rafferty	68	−4
T3	(England) Andrew Sherborne	68	−4
T10	(Trinidad and Tobago) Stephen Ames	69	−3
T10	(England) Peter Baker	69	−3
T10	(Scotland) Gordon Brand Jnr	69	−3
T10	(England) Howard Clark	69	−3
T10	(England) Andrew Murray	69	−3
T10	(England) Jamie Spence	69	−3
T10	(Denmark) Steen Tinning	69	−3
T10	(Scotland) Sam Torrance	69	−3
T10	(South Africa) Wayne Westner	69	−3

=== Second round ===
Saturday, 29 May 1993

Place	Player	Score	To par
1	(England) Mark James	68-68=136	−8
T2	(Argentina) José Cóceres	70-67=137	−7
T2	(Northern Ireland) Ronan Rafferty	68-69=137	−7
T4	(England) Andrew Murray	69-69=138	−6
T4	(Scotland) Andrew Oldcorn	70-68=138	−6
T4	(Sweden) Jesper Parnevik	70-68=138	−6
T7	(United States) Glen Day	72-67=139	−5
T7	(Sweden) Joakim Haeggman	70-69=139	−5
T7	(Germany) Bernhard Langer	70-69=139	−5
T7	(Scotland) Colin Montgomerie	70-69=139	−5
T7	(New Zealand) Frank Nobilo	72-67=139	−5
T7	(Australia) Peter O'Malley	70-69=139	−5

=== Third round ===
Sunday, 30 May 1993

Place	Player	Score	To par
1	(Germany) Bernhard Langer	70-69-67=206	−10
T2	(England) Mark James	68-68-73=209	−7
T2	(Zimbabwe) Tony Johnstone	74-66-69=209	−7
T2	(New Zealand) Frank Nobilo	72-67-70=209	−7
5	(Scotland) Colin Montgomerie	70-69-71=210	−6
T6	(Zimbabwe) Mark McNulty	72-71-69=212	−4
T6	(England) Peter Mitchell	73-70-69=212	−4
T6	(Northern Ireland) Ronan Rafferty	68-69-75=212	−4
T9	(South Africa) De Wet Basson	68-75-70=213	−3
T9	(Scotland) Gordon Brand Jnr	69-71-73=213	−3
T9	(United States) Glen Day	72-67-74=213	−3
T9	(England) Carl Mason	71-71-71=213	−3
T9	(Wales) Mark Mouland	72-68-73=213	−3
T9	(Argentina) Eduardo Romero	71-71-71=213	−3
T9	(England) Andrew Sherborne	68-72-73=213	−3
T9	(New Zealand) Greg Turner	73-69-71=213	−3

=== Final round ===
Monday, 31 May 1993

Place	Player	Score	To par	Money (€)
1	(Germany) Bernhard Langer	70-69-67-68=274	−14	163,324
T2	(Scotland) Gordon Brand Jnr	69-71-73-67=280	−8	73,075
T2	(Scotland) Colin Montgomerie	70-69-71-70=280	−8	73,075
T2	(New Zealand) Frank Nobilo	72-67-70-71=280	−8	73,075
5	(Zimbabwe) Mark McNulty	72-71-69-69=281	−7	41,496
6	(Zimbabwe) Tony Johnstone	74-66-69-74=283	−5	34,300
T7	(United States) Glen Day	72-67-74-71=284	−4	25,251
T7	(Argentina) Eduardo Romero	71-71-71-71=284	−4	25,251
T7	(New Zealand) Greg Turner	73-69-71-71=284	−4	25,251
T10	(South Africa) De Wet Basson	68-75-70-72=285	−3	16,611
T10	(Argentina) José Cóceres	70-67-79-69=285	−3	16,611
T10	(Australia) Peter Fowler	73-71-71-70=285	−3	16,611
T10	(England) Peter Mitchell	73-70-69-73=285	−3	16,611
T10	(Spain) José María Olazábal	74-70-73-68=285	−3	16,611
T10	(England) Andrew Sherborne	68-72-73-72=285	−3	16,611
