= 1947 Walker Cup =

Golf tournament

11th Walker Cup Match
- Dates: 16–17 May 1947
- Venue: Old Course at St Andrews
- Location: St Andrews, Scotland
- Captains: John Beck (GB&I); Francis Ouimet (USA)
(United Kingdom) (Republic of Ireland)	4	8	(United States)
- United States wins the Walker Cup

The 1947 Walker Cup, the 11th Walker Cup Match, was played on 16 and 17 May 1947, on the Old Course at St Andrews, Scotland. The United States won by 8 matches to 4.

The match should have been played in the United States; the previous match, in 1938, having been played at St. Andrews. However, the Royal and Ancient decided that it would have been impossible to send a team to the United States. Rather than postpone the match, the USGA agreed that the match would take place in Britain.

== Format ==
Four 36-hole matches of foursomes were played on Friday and eight singles matches on Saturday. Each of the 12 matches was worth one point in the larger team competition. If a match was all square after the 36th hole extra holes were not played. The team with most points won the competition. If the two teams were tied, the previous winner would retain the trophy.

== Teams ==
Nine players for the United States and Great Britain & Ireland participated in the event plus one non-playing captain for each team. The U.S. team was announced in January and included Cary Middlecoff. Middlecoff immediately withdrew from the team, as he intended turning professional, and was replaced by the first reserve George Hamer. The British team was announced less than a week before the match after a series of trial matches. The United States used the same eight players on both day, Hamer being left out. For Great Britain and Ireland, Micklem was left out of the foursomes while Kyle was left out of the singles.

=== Great Britain & Ireland ===
&
Captain: (England) John Beck

- (Republic of Ireland) Joe Carr
- (England) Leonard Crawley
- (Republic of Ireland) Cecil Ewing
- (Scotland) Alex Kyle
- (England) Laddie Lucas
- (England) Gerald Micklem
- (England) Charlie Stowe
- (England) Ronnie White
- (Scotland) James Wilson

=== United States ===
Captain: Francis Ouimet

- Ted Bishop
- Dick Chapman
- George Hamer
- Fred Kammer
- Smiley Quick
- Skee Riegel
- Frank Stranahan
- Willie Turnesa
- Bud Ward

== Friday's foursomes ==
&	Results
Carr/Ewing	(United States) 3 & 2	Bishop/Riegel
Crawley/Lucas	(United Kingdom) (Republic of Ireland) 5 & 4	Ward/Quick
Kyle/Wilson	(United States) 5 & 4	Turnesa/Kammer
White/Stowe	(United Kingdom) (Republic of Ireland) 4 & 3	Stranahan/Chapman
2	Foursomes	2
2	Overall	2

== Saturday's singles ==
&	Results
Leonard Crawley	(United States) 5 & 3	Bud Ward
Joe Carr	(United Kingdom) (Republic of Ireland) 5 & 3	Ted Bishop
Gerald Micklem	(United States) 6 & 5	Skee Riegel
Cecil Ewing	(United States) 6 & 5	Willie Turnesa
Charlie Stowe	(United States) 2 & 1	Frank Stranahan
Ronnie White	(United Kingdom) (Republic of Ireland) 4 & 3	Fred Kammer
James Wilson	(United States) 8 & 6	Smiley Quick
Laddie Lucas	(United States) 4 & 3	Dick Chapman
2	Singles	6
4	Overall	8
