= John Beck (golfer) =

English golfer

Personal information
- Full name: John Beaumont Beck
- Nationality: England
- Born: 13 August 1899 Luton, Bedfordshire, England
- Died: 20 June 1980 (aged 80) Kent, England

Career
- Sport: Golf
- Status: Amateur

Best results in major championships
- Masters Tournament: DNP
- PGA Championship: DNP
- U.S. Open: DNP
- The Open Championship: CUT: 1949

John Beaumont Beck MC (13 August 1899 – 20 June 1980) was an English amateur golfer. He played in the 1928 Walker Cup but is best remembered for being the captain in 1938, when Great Britain and Ireland won the Cup for the first time after nine defeats. He was also the non-playing captain in 1947.

Towards the end of the First World War, Beck served as a second lieutenant in the Coldstream Guards. In 1919, he was awarded the Military Cross.

Beck played in the 1928 Walker Cup at Chicago Golf Club in Wheaton, Illinois, a match the Americans won 11–1. He played in the foursomes, but was not selected for the singles.

Beck was selected as captain of the 1938 Walker Cup team, played on the Old Course at St Andrews. He was one of the 10-man team, but did not select himself for any of the matches. Great Britain and Ireland won the match 7–4, their first Walker Cup victory.

Beck was chosen as the non-playing captain of the 1947 Walker Cup team, again played on the Old Course at St Andrews.

He married Dorothy Pim in 1934. She was an Irish international golfer. She won the Irish Women's Amateur Close Championship in 1938, winning the title on the first day of the Walker Cup match.

R. C. Robertson-Glasgow said of Beck:

Indeed on the links he is an artist; self-reliant and, as you might say, self-supporting; more tightly strung as to temperament than his genial and healthy aspect might convey to the casual eye; fitly framed for strong battle, but not impervious to the access of sometimes unreasonable mistrust in his own skill; an artist in the execution of strokes, especially the spoon shot and the pitch-and-run obediently halting at the correct station; a past master - almost totally 'past' in a world of sullen standardisation - at the selection of those hickory clubs which restore to the mind's fond eye the picture of the professional in the shop parting from some fruits of his craft as reluctantly as a lover from his loved.

== Amateur wins ==
- 1921 Kashmir Cup
- 1925 Golf Illustrated Gold Vase (tied with Ernest Holderness)
- 1927 Lord Warden Challenge Cup
- 1932 Lord Warden Challenge Cup
- 1933 Royal St. George's Challenge Cup
- 1937 President's Putter
- 1946 Berkshire Trophy (tie with Robert Sweeny Jr.)

== Team appearances ==
- Walker Cup (representing Great Britain): 1928, 1938 (playing captain, winners), 1947 (non-playing captain)
- England–Scotland Amateur Match (representing England): 1926 (winners), 1930 (winners)
