= Jim Payne (golfer) =

English golfer (born 1970)

Personal information
- Full name: James Robert Payne
- Nationality: England
- Born: 17 April 1970 (age 56) Louth, Lincolnshire
- Height: 6 ft 4 in (1.93 m)
- Spouse: Jinnie Payne (m. 1998)

Career
- Sport: Golf
- Turned professional: 1991
- Former tour: European Tour
- Professional wins: 3
- Highest ranking: 96 (20 June 1993)

Number of wins by tour
- European Tour: 2
- Other: 1

Best results in major championships
- Masters Tournament: DNP
- PGA Championship: DNP
- U.S. Open: DNP
- The Open Championship: T38: 1991

Achievements and awards
- Sir Henry Cotton Rookie of the Year: 1992

James Robert Payne (born 17 April 1970) is an English professional golfer.

== Early life and amateur career ==
In 1970, Payne was born in Louth, Lincolnshire.

As an amateur he won the 1991 European Amateur and the British Youths Open Amateur Championship. He played with Jack Nicklaus in the final round of the 1991 Open Championship at Royal Birkdale and finished as leading amateur.

== Professional career ==
In 1991, Payne turned professional after playing in the Walker Cup later that year.

In 1992, Payne earned Rookie of the Year honors on the European Tour. He won two European Tour events, the 1993 Turespana Iberia Open de Baleares and the 1996 Italian Open. His last season on the European Tour was 2000. He had a promising career as a tournament golfer which petered out by his early thirties, partly due to injury problems which had required him to undergo a spinal fusion operation at the age of 24.

In 2003, he took a position as club professional at Southport and Ainsdale Golf Club, a two time venue of the Ryder Cup.

== Awards and honors ==
In 1992, Payne was awarded the Sir Henry Cotton Rookie of the Year.

== Amateur wins ==
- 1986 McGregor Trophy
- 1987 McGregor Trophy
- 1991 European Amateur, British Youths Open Amateur Championship

== Professional wins (3) ==
=== European Tour wins (2) ===
No.	Date	Tournament	Winning score	Margin of victory	Runner-up
1	14 Mar 1993	Turespaña Iberia Open de Baleares	−11 (73-66-71-67=277)	Playoff	(Sweden) Anders Gillner
2	5 May 1996	Conte of Florence Italian Open	−9 (70-71-67-67=275)	1 stroke	(Sweden) Patrik Sjöland

European Tour playoff record (1–0)

No.	Year	Tournament	Opponent	Result
1	1993	Turespaña Iberia Open de Baleares	(Sweden) Anders Gillner	Won with par on first extra hole

=== Other wins (1) ===
- 2000 Northern Open

== Results in major championships ==
Tournament	1991	1992	1993	1994	1995	1996	1997	1998	1999	2000	2001	2002	2003	2004	2005	2006
The Open Championship	T38 LA	CUT				T56	T48									CUT

Note: Payne only played in The Open Championship.

Did not play

LA = Low amateur
CUT = missed the half-way cut
"T" = tied

== Team appearances ==
Amateur

- Jacques Léglise Trophy (representing Great Britain & Ireland): 1987 (winners)
- St Andrews Trophy (representing Great Britain & Ireland): 1990 (winners)
- Walker Cup (representing Great Britain & Ireland): 1991
- European Amateur Team Championship (representing England): 1991 (winners), 1993

Professional

- World Cup (representing England): 1996
