= Volvo Albatross =

Golf tournament

Tournament information
- Location: Gothenburg, Sweden
- Established: 1985
- Course: Albatross Golfklubb
- Par: 72
- Tours: Challenge Tour; Swedish Golf Tour
- Format: Stroke play
- Prize fund: kr 400,000
- Final year: 1989

Tournament record score
- Aggregate: 283 Mats Lanner (1985)
- To par: −5 as above

Final champion
- (Sweden) Magnus Sunesson

Location map
- Location in Sweden

The Volvo Albatross was a golf tournament on the Swedish Golf Tour 1985–1989. It was played near Gothenburg, Sweden.

== Winners ==
Year	Tour (Note: CHA − Challenge Tour; SWE − Swedish Golf Tour.)	Winner	Score	To par	Margin of victory	Runner(s)-up	Venue	Ref.
Volvo Albatross
1989	CHA	(Sweden) Magnus Sunesson	209	−7	Playoff	(Denmark) Ole Eskildsen	Albatross	
1988	SWE	(Sweden) Nils Lindeblad	220	+4	4 strokes	(Denmark) Ole Eskildsen	Albatross	
1987	SWE	(Denmark) Anders Sørensen	213	−3	1 stroke	(Sweden) Anders Haglund (Sweden) Leif Hederström (Sweden) Magnus Persson	Albatross	
Owell Open
1986	SWE	(Sweden) Magnus Persson	208	−8	6 strokes	(Sweden) Anders Forsbrand	Albatross	
1985	SWE	(Sweden) Mats Lanner	283	−5	7 strokes	(Sweden) Anders Forsbrand	Växjö	
