= Alex Kyle =

Scottish golfer

Personal information
- Full name: Alexander Thompson Kyle
- Nationality: Scotland
- Born: 16 April 1907 Hawick, Roxburghshire, Scotland
- Died: 7 April 1990 (aged 82) Harrogate, North Yorkshire, England

Career
- Sport: Golf
- Status: Amateur

Best results in major championships (wins: 1)
- Masters Tournament: DNP
- PGA Championship: DNP
- U.S. Open: DNP
- The Open Championship: T20: 1939
- British Amateur: Won: 1939

Alexander Thompson Kyle (16 April 1907 – 7 April 1990) was a Scottish amateur golfer. He won the 1939 Amateur Championship and was in the British Walker Cup team in 1938, 1947 and 1951.

Kyle was born in Hawick, Roxburghshire, Scotland but his family moved to Peebles when he was about two years old. Kyle learnt his golf at Peebles Golf Club. Kyle moved to Yorkshire in 1931 and was a member of Sand Moor Golf Club, north of Leeds.

Kyle was selected for the 1938 Walker Cup team. Kyle was last out in the singles on the final day, playing Fred Haas. With just two matches unfinished, Great Britain and Ireland led by a point and needed to win of the two remaining matches. The Cecil Ewing/Ray Billows match went to the final hole but Kyle won his match 5&4 to give Britain their first win in the Walker Cup after nine defeats.

In 1939 Kyle won the Amateur Championship beating Welshman Tony Duncan 2&1 in the final. The match was level after 33 holes but Duncan missed a short putt at the 34th and went out-of-bounds at the 35th to give Kyle victory.

Kyle played in two further Walker Cup matches, in 1947 and 1951. He won his final singles match in 1951, beating Willie Turnesa by 2 holes having been 4 down at lunch.

Kyle married Edith Mary Rhodes in 1949, herself an England golf internationalist who represented Great Britain in the 1939 Vagliano Trophy. Edith died in 1959 aged 52.

== Amateur wins ==
this list is incomplete

- 1939 The Amateur Championship

== Major championships ==
=== Wins (1) ===
Year	Championship	Winning score	Runner-up
1939	Amateur Championship	2 & 1	(Wales) Tony Duncan

=== Results timeline ===
Tournament	1939	1940	1941	1942	1943	1944	1945	1946	1947	1948	1949	1950	1951	1952
The Open Championship	T20	NT	NT	NT	NT	NT	NT	CUT						T34

Note: Kyle only played in The Open Championship.

Did not play

NT = No tournament
CUT = missed the half-way cut
"T" indicates a tie for a place

== Team appearances ==
Amateur

- Walker Cup (representing Great Britain): 1938 (winners), 1947, 1951
