= Naturgas Open =

Tournament information
- Location: Lund, Sweden
- Established: 1986
- Course: Lunds Akademiska Golklubb
- Par: 71
- Tours: Challenge Tour; Nordic Golf League; Swedish Golf Tour
- Format: Stroke play
- Prize fund: kr 200,000
- Month played: May
- Final year: 2007

Tournament record score
- Aggregate: 199 Ludwig Nordeklint
- To par: −11 as above

Final champion
- (Sweden) Ludwig Nordeklint

Location map
- Location in Sweden

The Naturgas Open was a golf tournament on the Swedish Golf Tour between 1986 and 2007 held in Lund, Sweden. It featured on the inaugural Challenge Tour in 1989 and was always played at Lunds Akademiska, except in 2005 when it was held at nearby Örestad Golf Club.

== Winners ==
Year	Tour (Note: CHA − Challenge Tour; NGL − Nordic Golf League; SWE − Swedish Golf Tour.)	Winner	Score	To par	Margin of victory	Runner(s)-up	Purse	Ref.
Gambro Open
2007	NGL	(Sweden) Ludwig Nordeklint	199	−11	1 stroke	(Sweden) Robin Wingårdh (a)	200,000	
2006	NGL	(Sweden) Johan Carlsson (a)	204	−6	Playoff	(Sweden) Per Barth	200,000	
2005	NGL	(Sweden) Jimmy Kawalec	208	−5	4 strokes	(Sweden) Björn Bäck (Sweden) Fredrik Söderström	175,000	
2004	NGL	(Sweden) Björn Bäck	211	−5	2 strokes	(Sweden) Henrik Allenbrant	175,000	
2003	NGL	(Sweden) Johan Möller	210	−6	1 stroke	(Sweden) Pelle Edberg (Sweden) Marcus Norgren	200,000	
1990–2002: No tournament
Naturgas Open
1989	CHA	(England) Jeff Hall	210	−6	2 strokes	(Sweden) Fredrik Gemmel (Sweden) Joakim Haeggman (Sweden) Mikael Karlsson (Sweden) Olle Nordberg (England) Tony Stevens	250,000	
1988	SWE	(Australia) Terry Price	210	−6	Playoff	(England) Joe Higgins	250,000	
1987	SWE	(Sweden) Carl-Magnus Strömberg	215	−1	3 strokes	(Sweden) Ulf Nilsson (Sweden) Johan Ryström	200,000	
1986	SWE	(Australia) Mike Harwood	214	−2	3 strokes	(Sweden) Per-Arne Brostedt	175,000	
