= Czechoslovak Open =

Tournament information
- Location: Czechoslovakia
- Established: 1935
- Format: Stroke play
- Month played: August
- Final year: 1938

Tournament record score
- Aggregate: 276 Mark Seymour (1935)

Final champion
- Henry Cotton

Location in modern Czech Republic

The Czechoslovak Open was a professional golf tournament played from 1935 to 1938. Mark Seymour won the inaugural 1935 championship with a score a 276, a record low aggregate for an open championship. Seymour retained the title in 1936 while Henry Cotton won in 1937 and 1938. The first three championships were held near Marienbad at the Royal Golf Club Mariánské Lázně.

== Winners ==
Year	Winner	Country	Venue	Score	Margin of victory	Runner-up	Ref
1935	Mark Seymour	England	Marienbad	276	4 strokes	(England) Arthur Lees	
1936	Mark Seymour	England	Marienbad	295	10 strokes	(England) G Wilson	
1937	Henry Cotton	England	Marienbad	279	5 strokes	(England) Arthur Lees	
1938	Henry Cotton	England	Carlsbad	282	11 strokes	(Scotland) Bill Laidlaw	
