= Alex Hay =

Scottish professional golfer (1933–2011)

Alex Hay (10 May 1933 – 11 July 2011) was a Scottish professional golfer, golf instructor, writer and a former BBC sports commentator. Hay was best known for his commentating partnership with Peter Alliss where their banter, often displaying humour or wit became regarded by many as the "Voice of Golf". He was a former Ryder Cup referee.

== Early life ==
In 1933, Hay was born in Edinburgh, Scotland. He was educated at Musselburgh Grammar School. Hay joined Ben Sayers as an apprentice golf club maker before becoming assistant to Bill Shankland at Potters Bar.

== Professional career ==
Hay was the professional at East Herts and Dunham Forest. For 12 years, he was the professional at Ashridge Golf Club between 1964 and 1976. In 1977, he became professional and then the managing director of the Woburn Golf Club in England. Hay worked as a professional golfer until 1994.

In 1978, he started working for the BBC. He worked for them until 2004. He co-presented all the major golf tournaments with fellow commentator Peter Alliss during this period. Hay and Alliss were also renowned for their enduring friendship outside of the commentary. Hay also provided commentary with Alliss in the Actua Golf video game series.

Although Hay retired from broadcasting, he remained involved in the professional golf scene. He was noted for his golfing instruction, particularly the techniques of the swing. He wrote numerous works on the subject.

== Personal life ==
His son David, also a golfer, is proprietor of the Galloway's Restaurant in Woburn, England.

Hay died on 11 July 2011, following a short illness. He was aged 78.
