= John Pritchett (golfer) =

English golfer (1931–1958)

Personal information
- Full name: John D'Ewes Pritchett
- Nationality: England
- Born: 1931 England
- Died: 30 October 1958 (aged 27) Hartley Wintney, Hampshire, England

Career
- Sport: Golf
- Turned professional: 1949
- Professional wins: 1

Best results in major championships
- Masters Tournament: DNP
- PGA Championship: DNP
- U.S. Open: DNP
- The Open Championship: CUT: 1956

John D'Ewes Pritchett (1931 – 30 October 1958) was an English professional golfer. He was Boys Amateur Champion in 1948 and won the Daks Tournament in 1955. He was killed in a road traffic accident at the age of 27.

== Golf career ==
Pritchett won the Boys Amateur Championship in 1948 beating David Reid, a Scot. Pritchett had been 5 down with 10 holes to play and was dormie-3. However he won the next four holes to win the championship at the 37th hole. Pritchett played for England against Scotland in the Boys International played prior to the championship. He attended Bishop Vesey's Grammar School in Sutton Coldfield.

Pritchett became an assistant professional at Sunningdale Golf Club in 1949. In 1953, at the age of 21, he was a runner-up in the Silver King Tournament behind Flory Van Donck. He won the 1955 Daks Tournament, which was played at Sunningdale, beating Dai Rees by 2 strokes and winning the first prize of £600. He became full professional at Stoneham Golf Club near Southampton in late 1957.

== Death ==
Pritchett died in a road traffic accident on 30 October 1958 aged 27. He was in a car being driver by Philip Scrutton, a leading amateur golfer, when they were hit by an army lorry on the A30, just west of Blackbushe Airport, Hampshire. Scrutton was also killed. Pritchett and Scrutton had played together in the 1958 Wentworth Foursomes, losing in the final. Pritchett had married Annie Eirwen Evans in 1956. Annie did not remarry and died in 1989.

== Amateur wins ==
- 1948 Boys Amateur Championship

== Professional wins ==
- 1955 Daks Tournament

== Results in major championships ==
Tournament	1956
The Open Championship	CUT

Note: Pritchett only played in The Open Championship.

CUT = Missed the cut
