= 1984 Swedish Golf Tour =

Golf tour season

1984 Swedish Golf Tour season
- Duration: 31 May 1984 – 30 September 1984
- Number of official events: 8
- Most wins: (Sweden) Anders Forsbrand (2)
- Order of Merit: (Sweden) Mats Lanner

The 1984 Swedish Golf Tour was the inaugural season of the Swedish Golf Tour, the main professional golf tour in Sweden since it was formed in 1984.

== Schedule ==
The following table lists official events during the 1984 season.

Date	Tournament	Location	Purse (SKr)	Winner (Note: The number in brackets after each winner's name is the number of Swedish Golf Tour events they had won up to and including that tournament.)
2 Jun	Martini Cup Helsingborg Open	Skåne	125,000	(Sweden) Anders Johnsson (1)
16 Jun	Maggi Cup	Skåne	125,000	(Sweden) Magnus Sunesson (1)
30 Jun	PLM Open	Skåne	250,000	(England) Tommy Horton (n/a)
4 Aug	Swedish PGA Championship	Värmland	200,000	(Sweden) Per-Arne Brostedt (1)
11 Aug	Swedish International	Västerbotten	200,000	(Sweden) Anders Forsbrand (1)
18 Aug	Gevalia Open	Gästrikland	150,000	(Sweden) Anders Forsbrand (2)
23 Sep	Stiab Grand Prix	Skåne	220,000	(Sweden) Mats Lanner (1)
30 Sep	Kullenburg Play-Off	Östergötland	150,000	(Sweden) Mats Lanner (2)

== Order of Merit ==
The Order of Merit was based on prize money won during the season, calculated in Swedish krona.

Position	Player	Prize money (SKr)
1	(Sweden) Mats Lanner	158,925
2	(Sweden) Anders Forsbrand	121,625
3	(Sweden) Per-Arne Brostedt	90,250
4	(Sweden) Peter Carsbo	66,875
5	(Sweden) Mats Hallberg	60,950
