= Berkshire Trophy =

Tournament information
- Location: England
- Established: 1946
- Course: The Berkshire Golf Club
- Format: Stroke play
- Month played: June

Current champion
- Aaron Moody

The Berkshire Trophy is the amateur stroke play golf championship played at The Berkshire Golf Club in England. It has been played annually since 1946. The format is 72 hole stroke play contested over two days. Both the Blue and Red courses are used on the Saturday with the leading 40 scores and ties going through to play two further rounds on the Red course on the Sunday. If two or more players are tied after 72 holes they share the trophy; there is no playoff.

The player with the lowest combined aggregate over the Brabazon and Berkshire Trophies is awarded the "Philip Scrutton Jug".

== Winners ==
Year	Winner	Country	Score
2026	Aaron Moody	England	271
2025	Jake Sowden	England	280
2024	Freddie Turnell	England	276
2023	Max Berrisford; Freddie Turnell	England; England	271 (tie)
2022	Alex James	Wales	276
2021	Zachary Chegwidden	England	270
2020	Cancelled		
2019	Oliver Farrell; Haider Hussain	England; England	271 (tie)
2018	George Gardner; Matthew Roberts	England; Wales	278 (tie)
2017	Adam Lumley	England	269
2016	Steffan Harm	Germany	273
2015	Billy McKenzie	England	278
2014	Ryan Cornfield	England	280
2013	Ryan Evans	England	279
2012	Joshua White	England	280
2011	Joshua White	England	277
2010	Eddie Pepperell	England	275
2009	Farren Keenan	England	268
2008	Farren Keenan	England	279
2007	Luke Collins	England	276
2006	David Hewan	South Africa	273
2005	Adam Gee	England	275
2004	Sam Osborne	England	267
2003	Adam Blyth; Ross Fisher	Australia; England	275 (tie)
2002	Gary Wolstenholme	England	267
2001	Greg Evans	England	283
2000	Colin Edwards; Kevin Freeman	England; England	281 (tie)
1999	Darren Henley	England	275
1998	Mark Hilton	England	284
1997	Gary Wolstenholme	England	275
1996	Gary Wolstenholme	England	274
1995	Gary Harris	England	275
1994	James Knight; Andrew Marshall	England; England	274 (tie)
1993	Van Phillips	England	271
1992	Van Phillips	England	274
1991	John Bickerton	England	280
1990	Jerome O'Shea	England	271
1989	John Metcalfe	England	272
1988	Russell Claydon	England	276
1987	Jeremy Robinson	England	275
1986	Richard Muscroft	England	280
1985	Peter McEvoy	England	279
1984	Jonathan Plaxton	England	276
1983	Stephen Hamer	England	288
1982	Stephen Keppler	England	278
1981	David Blakeman	England	280
1980	Paul Downes	England	280
1979	David Williams	England	274
1978	Peter Hedges	England	281
1977	Sandy Lyle	Scotland	279
1976	Peter Hedges	England	284
1975	Nick Faldo	England	281
1974	John Downie	England	280
1973	Peter Hedges	England	278
1972	Peter Davidson	England	280
1971	Michael Bonallack; John Davies	England; England	277 (tie)
1970	Michael Bonallack	England	274
1969	John Davies	England	278
1968	Michael Bonallack	England	273
1967	Dudley Millensted	England	283
1966	Peter Oosterhuis	England	287
1965	Michael Bonallack	England	278
1964	Rodney Foster	England	281
1963	David Frame	England	289
1962	Sandy Saddler	Scotland	279
1961	Michael Bonallack	England	275
1960	Guy Wolstenholme	England	276
1959	Joe Carr	Ireland	279
1958	Arthur Perowne; Guy Wolstenholme	England; England	284 (tie)
1957	Michael Bonallack	England	291
1956	Guy Wolstenholme	England	285
1955	Kim Hall; Gerald Micklem	Wales; England	282 (tie)
1954	Edward Bromley-Davenport	England	303
1953	John Llewellyn Morgan	Wales	289
1952	Philip Scrutton	England	286
1951	Philip Scrutton	England	301
1950	Philip Scrutton	England	296
1949	Laddie Lucas	England	300
1948	Leonard Crawley	England	301
1947	Laddie Lucas	England	298
1946	John Beck; Robert Sweeny Jr.	England; United States	148 (tie)
