= Mike Harwood =

Australian professional golfer (born 1959)

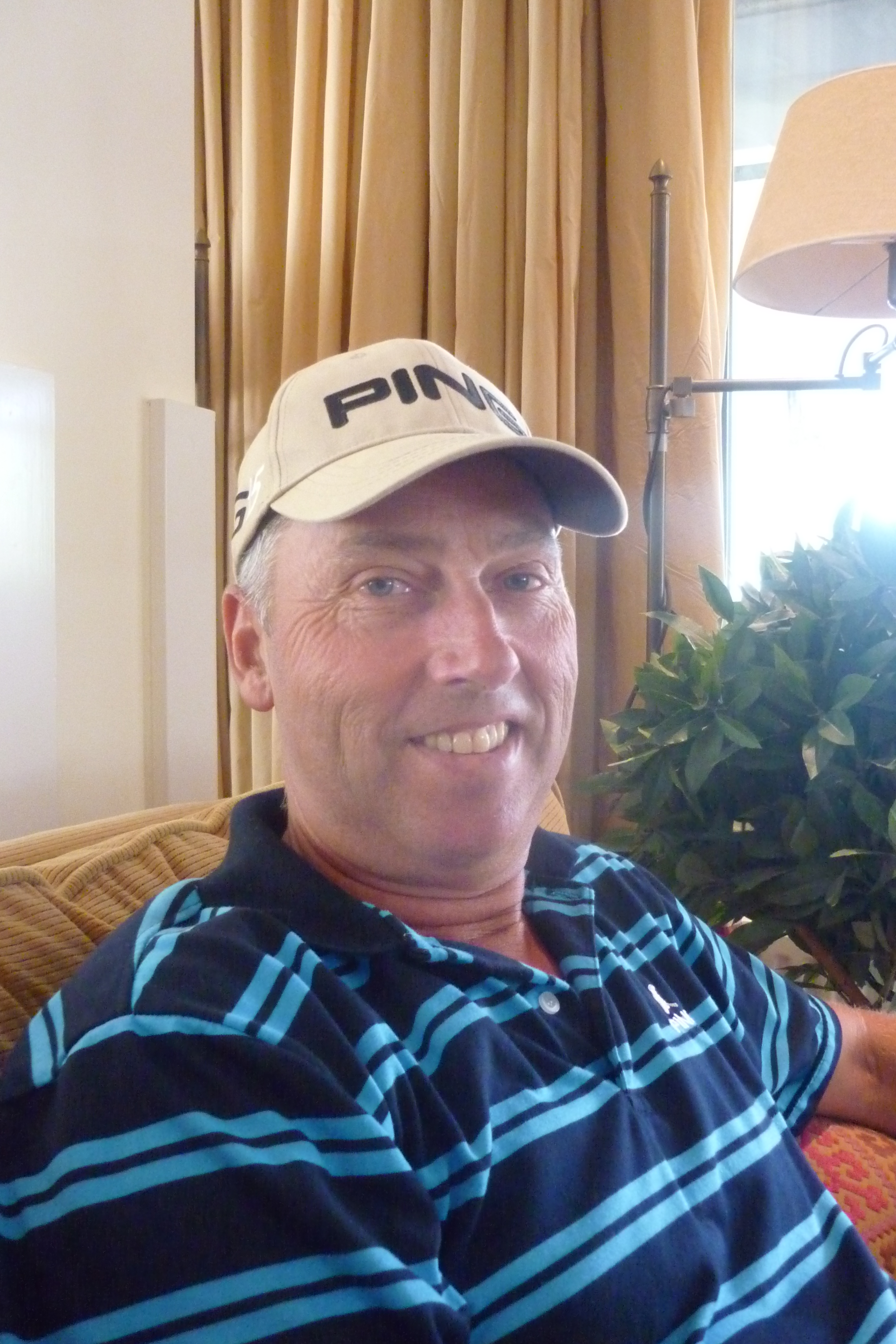

Personal information
- Full name: Michael Geoffrey Harwood
- Nationality: Australia
- Born: 8 January 1959 (age 67) Sydney, New South Wales, Australia
- Height: 6 ft 4 in (1.93 m)
- Weight: 200 lb (91 kg; 14 st)
- Spouse: Donna
- Children: 5

Career
- Sport: Golf
- Turned professional: 1979
- Current tour: European Senior Tour
- Former tours: European Tour; PGA Tour of Australasia
- Professional wins: 72
- Highest ranking: 20 (22 September 1991)

Number of wins by tour
- European Tour: 5
- PGA Tour of Australasia: 2
- European Senior Tour: 1
- Other: 65

Best results in major championships
- Masters Tournament: DNP
- PGA Championship: CUT: 1991, 1992
- U.S. Open: T49: 1991
- The Open Championship: 2nd: 1991

Achievements and awards
- European Senior Tour Rookie of the Year: 2009

Michael Geoffrey Harwood (born 8 January 1959) is an Australian professional golfer, who finished second at the 1991 Open Championship.

== Career ==
In 1959, Harwood was born in Sydney, Australia.

In 1979, Harwood turned professional and has extensive experience on the PGA Tour of Australasia and the European Tour. His first Australian title was the 1986 Australian PGA Championship. He won five times on the European Tour; the first was at the 1988 Portuguese Open and the second was the 1989 PLM Open. In 1990, his first of three major Europe wins was the European Tour's flagship tournament at Wentworth, which was then called the Volvo PGA Championship, later that year he won the Volvo Masters at Valderrama, two weeks later in Australia he won the West End South Australian Open by five strokes. He achieved a career best European Tour Order of Merit ranking of sixth that year.

The following year, 1991, he was runner-up to fellow Australian Ian Baker-Finch at the Open Championship at Royal Birkdale, several weeks later he won the GA European Open at Walton Heath. In his prime, he played occasionally in the United States but never had a top-10 finish in any PGA Tour event. In late 1991, Harwood achieved his highest world ranking of #20. His round of 61 at the Australian PGA Championship at Concord in 1992 was his best professional score recorded. Harwood served as a board member of the Australian PGA in the early 2000s.

=== Senior career ===
Harwood won his first title on the European Senior Tour at the season ending OKI Castellón Senior Tour Championship by three strokes. Harwood to finish 9th on the 2009 final money list and earned him the title of Rookie of the Year. Despite over 100 Pro-Am victories, it marked his first professional tournament win in 18 years. He again finished in the top-10 of the European Senior Tour Order of Merit in 2011.

Harwood won the Order of Merit and Rookie of the Year honours on the Australian Senior Tour (PGA Legends Tour) in 2009. He won the Order of Merit a second time in 2015, by a significant margin. He has won over 75 events on the senior tour including the Australian Senior Open, Australian PGA Seniors Championship, and twice winning the Senior TPC Championship.

In 2019, he won the first two event of season, the Victorian Senior Masters and Victorian Senior PGA Championship. He also won 2019 Legend Tour Player of year.

== Awards and honors ==
- In 2009, Harwood won the European Senior Tour Rookie of the Year award.
- Also in 2009, Harwood earned Australian PGA Legends Tour Rookie of the Year honors.

== Professional wins (72) ==
=== European Tour wins (5) ===
Legend
Flagship events (1)
Tour Championships (1)
Other European Tour (3)

No.	Date	Tournament	Winning score	Margin of victory	Runner(s)-up
1	1 May 1988	Portuguese Open	−8 (73-70-68-69=280)	1 stroke	(Republic of Ireland) Eamonn Darcy
2	20 Aug 1989	PLM Open	−13 (66-70-67-68=271)	1 stroke	(Australia) Peter Senior
3	28 May 1990	Volvo PGA Championship	−17 (69-68-67-67=271)	1 stroke	(South Africa) John Bland, (England) Nick Faldo
4	28 Oct 1990	Volvo Masters	+2 (70-72-73-71=286)	1 stroke	(England) Steven Richardson, (Scotland) Sam Torrance
5	1 Sep 1991	GA European Open	−11 (70-72-70-65=277)	2 strokes	(Scotland) Sandy Lyle

=== PGA Tour of Australia wins (2) ===
No.	Date	Tournament	Winning score	Margin of victory	Runner(s)-up
1	2 Nov 1986	Toshiba Australian PGA Championship	−13 (69-69-73-64=275)	2 strokes	(Australia) Greg Norman
2	18 Nov 1990	West End South Australian Open	−14 (66-71-73-68=278)	5 strokes	(Australia) Paul Moloney, (New Zealand) Simon Owen

=== Swedish Golf Tour wins (1) ===
No.	Date	Tournament	Winning score	Margin of victory	Runner-up
1	25 May 1986	Naturgas Open	−2 (73-72-69=214)	3 strokes	(Sweden) Per-Arne Brostedt

=== Other wins (4) ===
- 1984 Fiji Open, Pacific Harbour Open (Fiji), Western Samoan Open
- 1996 Victorian PGA Championship

=== European Senior Tour wins (1) ===
Legend
Tour Championships (1)
Other European Senior Tour (0)

No.	Date	Tournament	Winning score	Margin of victory	Runner-up
1	8 Nov 2009	OKI Castellón Senior Tour Championship	−13 (65-72-66=203)	3 strokes	(Paraguay) Ángel Franco

=== Asia Pacific Champions Tour wins (1) ===
- 2011 City of South Perth Masters Pro-Am

=== PGA of Australia Legends Tour wins (58) ===
note: this list is probably incomplete

- 2009 (3) Australian Senior Open, Tasmanian Senior Open, NSW PGA Seniors Championship
- 2010 (3) NZ Handa Seniors PGA Championship, Tasmanian Senior Open, Queensland PGA Senior Championship
- 2011 (1) NSW PGA Seniors Championship
- 2012 (2) Australian PGA Seniors Championship, Tasmanian Senior Open
- 2013 (3) Victorian Senior Open, TPC Championship, Kiama Legends Pro-Am (with Noel Ratcliffe)
- 2014 (5) Moran Healthcare Group Senior Pro-Am (with Peter Fowler), John Newell Mazda Legends Pro-Am, Wayne Riley Hurstville City Council Legends Pro-Am, Kiama Legends Pro-Am, STA, CPA & Dental Solutions Tewantin Noosa Legends Pro-Am (with Simon Corbett)
- 2015 (17) Vertigan Partners Tasmanian Senior Open, Southern Wide Tokarahi Legends Pro-Am, Lakes Resort Pauanui Legends Pro-Am (with Peter Fowler), Bega Cheese Legends Pro-Am, VIC PGA Senior Foursomes Championship (with three others), Portsea Legends Pro-Am, Nelson Hotel Blue Lake Legends Pro-Am, Mini Jumbuk PGA Legends Pro-Am (with two others), SA PGA Senior Foursomes Championship (with Lucian Tinkler), Swanbury Penglase SA PGA Senior Championship, Bargara Legends Pro-Am, Bermagui Legends Pro-Am, NSW/ACT PGA Senior Championship, Tooheys Senior Pro-Am, Kids Xpress Legends Charity Pro-Am, Kareela Moran Group Pro-Am, Fiji Masters Legends Pro-Am
- 2016 (4) Tasmanian Senior Open, Bermagui Legends Pro-Am, David Mercer Senior Classic, Sylvania BMW 2016 Legends Pro-Am
- 2017 (4) Sandhurst Club Legends Pro-Am, Innovative Pest Control Legends Pro-Am (with Peter Woodward), Sylvania BMW Legends Pro-Am, Wayne Riley Georges River Council Legends Pro-Am
- 2018 (5) Media Works Legends Pro Am (with John Onions), Elanora Country Club Legends Pro-Am, JL Pierce Transport Pymble Legends Pro-Am, Stacks Finance Taree Legends Pro-Am (with Chris Hollingsworth), Australian Legends Tour Championship
- 2019 (8) Peach's Fruit Market Victorian Senior Masters, Shepparton BMW Black Bull Victorian PGA Seniors Championship, Newshub Legends Pro Am, Hanmer Springs Thermal Pools Legends Pro-Am, The Bruce Green Legends Pro-Am, Kerry Campbell Homes Fraser Coast Classic (with two others), CMBM Facility Services City Legends Pro-Am, Townsville Legends Pro-Am, Bendigo Community Bank Strathfield
- 2021 (2) Elgin Valley Beerwah Legends Pro-Am (with Peter Senior), The Toowoomba Golf Club Legends Pro Am presented by The Ninth Middle Ridge
- 2022 (1) Barwon Cleaning Supplies Portarlington Legends Pro-Am

=== Other senior wins (1) ===
- 2012 SriLankan Airlines Senior Golf Masters

== Results in major championships ==
Tournament	1986	1987	1988	1989	1990	1991	1992	1993	1994
U.S. Open						T49	CUT		
The Open Championship	CUT	CUT	CUT	T39	CUT	2	T45	T73	CUT
PGA Championship						CUT	CUT		

Note: Harwood never played in the Masters Tournament.

Top 10
Did not play

CUT = missed the half-way cut
"T" = tied

== Team appearances ==
- World Cup (representing Australia): 1984, 1991
- Dunhill Cup (representing Australia): 1991
- Four Tours World Championship (representing Australasia): 1991
