= Czech Open (golf) =

Golf tournament in Beroun, Czech Republic

Tournament information
- Location: Beroun, Czech Republic
- Established: 1990
- Course: Royal Beroun Golf Club
- Par: 71
- Tours: European Tour; Alps Tour; Czech PGA Tour
- Format: Stroke play
- Prize fund: 600,000 Kč
- Month played: August

Tournament record score
- Aggregate: 252 Filip Mrůzek (2024)
- To par: −32 as above

Current champion
- (Czech Republic) Filip Mrůzek

Location map
- Location in the Czech Republic

The Czech Open is a professional golf tournament, currently played on the Czech PGA Tour. It was formerly played on the European Tour between 1994−1998 and 2009−2012.

== History ==
The tournament first appeared on the European Tour schedule between 1994 and 1997 as the Chemapol Trophy Czech Open, and was the first European Tour event staged east of the former Iron Curtain after the fall of the Berlin Wall. The first three of those events were held at the Golf Club Mariánské Lázně in Mariánské Lázně, before moving to the Prague Karlstein Golf Club, overlooked by Karlštejn Castle, just outside Prague. Germany's former World Number 1 Bernhard Langer was much the most distinguished of the four champions.

Following flood disasters in the Czech Republic in 1997, the Czech Open in the following year was canceled at the request of the sponsors, and lost its place on the European Tour schedule as a result. In its final year, the prize fund was £804,788, which was above average for a European Tour event at that time.

Having been contested on the satellite Alps Tour in 2008, the Czech Open returned to the European Tour schedule for the 2009 season, when it was played at the Miguel Ángel Jiménez designed Prosper Golf Resort in Čeladná towards the end of July with a prize fund of €2.5 million. It was titled as the Moravia Silesia Open in 2009, and retitled again in 2010 to the Czech Open. The 2011 Czech Open was the last one held, with the 2012 edition being scheduled, but ultimately canceled due to a lack of funds.

Since 2014, the tournament has been part of the Czech PGA Tour.

== Winners ==
Year	Tour (Note: ALP − Alps Tour; CZE − Czech PGA Tour; EUR − European Tour.)	Winner	Score	To par	Margin of victory	Runner(s)-up
Czech Open
2024	CZE	(Czech Republic) Filip Mrůzek (4)	252	−32	7 strokes	(Slovakia) Jakub Hrinda
2023	CZE	(Hungary) Bence Bertényi	270	−18	2 strokes	(Czech Republic) Matěj Bača
2022	CZE	(France) Julien Brun	265	−23	Playoff	(Czech Republic) Aleš Kořínek
GolfAdvisor.golf Czech Open
2021	CZE	(Czech Republic) Filip Mrůzek (3)	264	−24	3 strokes	(Czech Republic) Matěj Bača
WGM Czech Open
2020	CZE	Cancelled due to the COVID-19 pandemic				
2019	CZE	(Czech Republic) Jan Cafourek	267	−21	5 strokes	(Slovakia) Štefan Páleník
2018	CZE	(Czech Republic) Filip Mrůzek (2)	266	−22	1 stroke	(Portugal) Tiago Cruz
2017	CZE	(Czech Republic) Petr Nič	270	−18	2 strokes	(Czech Republic) Filip Mrůzek
2016	CZE	(Czech Republic) Ondřej Lieser	282	−6	Playoff	(England) Luke Groves
2015	CZE	(Czech Republic) Filip Mrůzek	282	−6	1 stroke	(Czech Republic) Ondřej Lieser
2014	CZE	(Czech Republic) Martin Příhoda	278	−10	2 strokes	(Czech Republic) Jan Cafourek (Czech Republic) Lukáš Tintěra
Czech Open
2013: No tournament
2012	EUR	Cancelled due to lack of funding				
2011	EUR	(England) Oliver Fisher	275	−13	2 strokes	(Sweden) Mikael Lundberg
2010	EUR	(Sweden) Peter Hanson	278	−10	Playoff	(England) Gary Boyd (Republic of Ireland) Peter Lawrie
Moravia Silesia Open
2009	EUR	(Sweden) Oskar Henningsson	275	−13	2 strokes	(England) Sam Little (England) Steve Webster
Czech Golf Open
2008	ALP	(Austria) Clemens Prader	203	−13	7 strokes	(Austria) Michael Moser
Chemapol Trophy Czech Open
1999–2007: No tournament
1998	EUR	Cancelled due to flooding				
1997	EUR	(Germany) Bernhard Langer	264	−20	4 strokes	(Sweden) Niclas Fasth (Spain) Ignacio Garrido (Spain) Miguel Ángel Jiménez
1996	EUR	(England) Jonathan Lomas	272	−12	1 stroke	(Sweden) Daniel Chopra
1995	EUR	(United States) Peter Teravainen	268	−16	1 stroke	(England) Howard Clark
1994	EUR	(Sweden) Per-Ulrik Johansson	237 (Note: Shortened to 66 holes due to frost.)	−11	3 strokes	(Sweden) Klas Eriksson
Czech Open
1993: No tournament
1992		(Germany) Alex Čejka (2)				
1991: No tournament
1990		(Germany) Alex Čejka				

== See also ==
- Open golf tournament
- D+D Real Czech Masters
