= Open de Baleares =

Tournament information
- Location: Mallorca, Spain
- Established: 1988
- Course: Santa Ponsa Golf
- Par: 72
- Tour: European Tour
- Format: Stroke play
- Prize fund: £250,000
- Month played: March
- Final year: 1995

Tournament record score
- Aggregate: 269 Seve Ballesteros (1990); 269 Magnus Persson (1990); 269 Barry Lane (1994)
- To par: −19 as above

Final champion
- (New Zealand) Greg Turner
- Location in Spain Location in the Balearic Islands Location in Mallorca

The Open de Baleares was a European Tour golf tournament which was played annually from 1988 to 1995. It had five names in eight years. It was staged at various courses on Mallorca, the largest of the Balearic Islands of Spain. The most notable winner was five times major championship winner Seve Ballesteros, who won three of the first five events. The prize fund in sterling terms peaked at £300,000 in 1993 and by 1995 it was down to £250,000, which was one of the smallest on the European Tour that year.

== Winners ==
Year	Winner	Score	To par	Margin of victory	Runner(s)-up
Turespaña Open de Baleares
1995	(New Zealand) Greg Turner	274	−14	2 strokes	(Italy) Costantino Rocca
1994	(England) Barry Lane	269	−19	2 strokes	(England) Jim Payne
Turespaña Iberia Open de Baleares
1993	(England) Jim Payne	277	−11	Playoff	(Sweden) Anders Gillner
Turespaña Open de Baleares
1992	(Spain) Seve Ballesteros (3)	277	−11	Playoff	(Sweden) Jesper Parnevik
Open de Baleares
1991	(South Africa) Gavan Levenson	282	−6	1 stroke	(England) Steven Richardson
Open Renault de Baleares
1990	(Spain) Seve Ballesteros (2)	269	−19	Playoff	(Sweden) Magnus Persson
1989	(Sweden) Ove Sellberg	279	−9	2 strokes	(Zimbabwe) Mark McNulty (Spain) José María Olazábal (Wales) Philip Parkin
Mallorca Open de Baleares
1988	(Spain) Seve Ballesteros	272	−16	6 strokes	(Spain) José María Olazábal
