= Mark Nichols (golfer) =

English golfer

Personal information
- Full name: Mark Andrew Nichols
- Nationality: England
- Born: 29 December 1965 (age 60) Isle of Sheppey, Kent, England
- Height: 5 ft 7 in (1.70 m)

Career
- Sport: Golf
- Status: Professional
- Former tour: European Tour

Best results in major championships
- Masters Tournament: DNP
- PGA Championship: DNP
- U.S. Open: DNP
- The Open Championship: T101: 1995

Mark Andrew Nichols (born 29 December 1965) is an English professional golfer.

== Career ==
Nichols was born on the Isle of Sheppey. He played on the European Tour in 1994 and 1995, and the second tier Challenge Tour from 1990 to 1993, and again in 1996. He appeared in just one major, the 1995 Open Championship at St Andrews, where he made the cut.

Since leaving the tour, Nichols works as a teaching professional, and is currently employed at Moscow City Golf Club.

Nichols played in two Challenge Tour events in 2010, the Kazakhstan Open and the M2M Russian Challenge Cup which was played at the Tseleevo Golf & Polo Club, where Nichols used to work as Director.

== Playoff record ==
Challenge Tour playoff record (0–1)

No.	Year	Tournament	Opponents	Result
1	1992	Zambia Open	(Sweden) Mathias Grönberg, (England) Jeremy Robinson	Robinson won with birdie on first extra hole

== Results in major championships ==
Tournament	1995
The Open Championship	T101

Note: Nichols only played in The Open Championship.
"T" = tied
