= Jeff Hall (golfer) =

English golfer (born 1957)

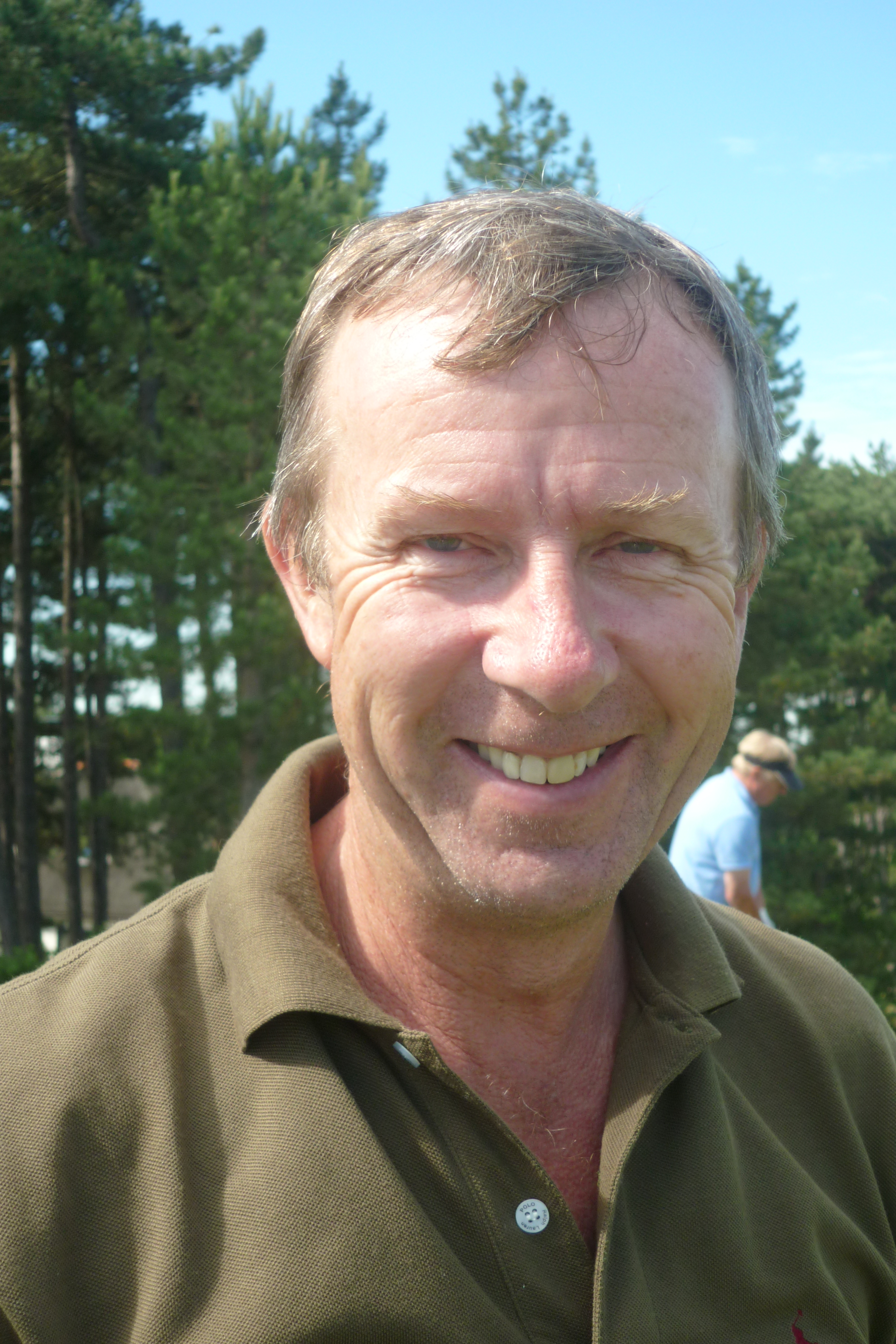

Personal information
- Full name: Jeffrey R. Hall
- Nationality: England
- Born: 4 July 1957 (age 69) Bristol, England
- Height: 5 ft 10 in (1.78 m)
- Spouse: Maria
- Children: 3

Career
- Sport: Golf
- Turned professional: 1976
- Former tours: European Tour; Challenge Tour; European Seniors Tour
- Professional wins: 3

Number of wins by tour
- European Tour: 1
- Challenge Tour: 2

Best results in major championships
- Masters Tournament: DNP
- PGA Championship: DNP
- U.S. Open: DNP
- The Open Championship: CUT: 1983, 1984, 1985, 1986

Jeffrey R. Hall (born 4 July 1957) is an English professional golfer.

== Career ==
In 1957, Hall was born in Bristol, England. In 1976, he turned professional and joined the European Tour the following year. He finished in the top one hundred of the European Tour Order of Merit seven times (1978–1984), with a best ranking of 28th in 1983. His sole European Tour win came at the 1983 Jersey Open.

Hall also won the 1992 Memorial Olivier Barras on the second-tier Challenge Tour.

== Professional wins (3) ==
=== European Tour wins (1) ===
No.	Date	Tournament	Winning score	Margin of victory	Runners-up
1	12 Jun 1983	Jersey Open	−10 (71-68-67-72=278)	1 stroke	(Scotland) Bernard Gallacher, (England) Michael King

=== Challenge Tour wins (2) ===
No.	Date	Tournament	Winning score	Margin of victory	Runner(s)-up
1	21 May 1989	Naturgas Open	−6 (70-69-71=210)	2 strokes	(Sweden) Fredrik Gemmel, (Sweden) Joakim Haeggman, (Sweden) Mikael Karlsson, (Sweden) Olle Nordberg, (England) Tony Stevens
2	28 Jun 1992	Memorial Olivier Barras	−8 (69-69-67=205)	Playoff	(Wales) Stephen Dodd

Challenge Tour playoff record (1–0)

No.	Year	Tournament	Opponent	Result
1	1992	Memorial Olivier Barras	(Wales) Stephen Dodd	Won with birdie on second extra hole

== Results in major championships ==
Tournament	1983	1984	1985	1986
The Open Championship	CUT	CUT	CUT	CUT

Note: Hall only played in The Open Championship.
CUT = missed the halfway cut (3rd round cut in 1984 Open Championship)
