= 1938 Walker Cup =

Golf tournament

10th Walker Cup Match
- Dates: 3–4 June 1938
- Venue: Old Course at St Andrews
- Location: St Andrews, Scotland
- Captains: John Beck (GB&I); Francis Ouimet (USA)
(United Kingdom) (Republic of Ireland)	7	4	(United States)
- Great Britain & Ireland wins the Walker Cup

The 1938 Walker Cup, the 10th Walker Cup Match, was played on 3 and 4 June 1938, on the Old Course at St Andrews, Scotland. Great Britain and Ireland won by 7 matches to 4 with one match halved. It was their first victory in the Walker Cup.

Great Britain & Ireland took a one-point lead after the first day foursomes. On the second day they won 5 of the 8 singles matches. They took a winning 6–4 lead when Alex Kyle beat Fred Haas, later increased to 7–4 when Cecil Ewing beat Ray Billows on the final green.

== Format ==
Four 36-hole matches of foursomes were played on Friday and eight singles matches on Saturday. Each of the 12 matches was worth one point in the larger team competition. If a match was all square after the 36th hole extra holes were not played. The team with most points won the competition. If the two teams were tied, the previous winner would retain the trophy.

== Teams ==
The United States selected a team of 8 and a non-playing captain in January. Great Britain and Ireland selected their captain, John Beck, in February, initially as a non-player. 8 members of the British team were selected in early May, at which time Beck was given the option of playing himself if he chose. Cecil Ewing was selected as the final member of the team in late May, after reaching the final of the Amateur Championship. In the end, Beck did not select himself for any matches. Ewing did not play in the foursomes but replaced Harry Bentley in the singles.

=== Great Britain & Ireland ===
&
Playing captain: (England) John Beck

- (England) Harry Bentley
- (Republic of Ireland) Jimmy Bruen
- (England) Leonard Crawley
- (Republic of Ireland) Cecil Ewing
- (Scotland) Alex Kyle
- (England) Frank Pennink
- (Scotland) Gordon Peters
- (England) Charlie Stowe
- (Scotland) Hector Thomson

=== United States ===
Captain: Francis Ouimet

- Ray Billows
- Johnny Fischer
- Johnny Goodman
- Fred Haas
- Chuck Kocsis
- Reynolds Smith
- Bud Ward
- Charlie Yates

== Friday's foursomes ==
&	Results
Bentley/Bruen	halved	Fischer/Kocsis
Peters/Thomson	(United Kingdom) (Republic of Ireland) 4 & 2	Goodman/Ward
Kyle/Stowe	(United States) 3 & 2	Yates/Billows
Pennink/Crawley	(United Kingdom) (Republic of Ireland) 3 & 1	Smith/Haas
2	Foursomes	1
2	Overall	1

== Saturday's singles ==
&	Results
Jimmy Bruen	(United States) 2 & 1	Charlie Yates
Hector Thomson	(United Kingdom) (Republic of Ireland) 6 & 4	Johnny Goodman
Leonard Crawley	(United States) 3 & 2	Johnny Fischer
Charlie Stowe	(United Kingdom) (Republic of Ireland) 2 & 1	Chuck Kocsis
Frank Pennink	(United States) 12 & 11	Bud Ward
Cecil Ewing	(United Kingdom) (Republic of Ireland) 1 up	Ray Billows
Gordon Peters	(United Kingdom) (Republic of Ireland) 9 & 8	Reynolds Smith
Alex Kyle	(United Kingdom) (Republic of Ireland) 5 & 4	Fred Haas
5	Singles	3
7	Overall	4
