= 1988 Swedish Golf Tour =

Golf tour season

1988 Swedish Golf Tour season
- Duration: 5 May 1988 – 2 October 1988
- Number of official events: 17
- Most wins: (Sweden) Leif Hederström (2) (Sweden) Jesper Parnevik (2)
- Order of Merit: (Sweden) Jesper Parnevik

The 1988 Swedish Golf Tour was the fifth season of the Swedish Golf Tour, the main professional golf tour in Sweden since it was formed in 1984.

== Schedule ==
The following table lists official events during the 1988 season.

Date	Tournament	Location	Purse (SKr)	Winner (Note: The number in brackets after each winner's name is the number of Swedish Golf Tour events they had won up to and including that tournament.)
8 May	Sapa Torekov Open	Skåne	350,000	(Sweden) Carl-Magnus Strömberg (4)
14 May	Lacoste Spalding Open	Denmark	225,000	(Sweden) Leif Hederström (1)
22 May	Naturgas Open	Skåne	250,000	(Australia) Terry Price (n/a)
29 May	Ramlösa Open	Västergötland	300,000	(Sweden) Jesper Parnevik (1)
5 Jun	Nescafé Cup	Skåne	275,000	(Sweden) Jan Tilmanis (1)
12 Jun	Teleannons Grand Prix	Skåne	400,000	(Sweden) Magnus Sunesson (3)
19 Jun	Stiga Open	Småland	225,000	(Sweden) Clas Hultman (1)
26 Jun	Odense Open	Denmark	225,000	(Sweden) Jesper Parnevik (2)
3 Jul	SI Trygg-Hansa Open	Gästrikland	275,000	(Norway) Per Haugsrud (1)
10 Jul	Scandinavian Tipo Trophy	Finland	225,000	(Sweden) Daniel Westermark (1)
24 Jul	SM Match Trygg-Hansa Cup	Småland	325,000	(Sweden) Mikael Krantz (1)
7 Aug	Länsförsäkringar Open	Halland	500,000	(Fiji) Vijay Singh (n/a)
21 Aug	Gevalia Open	Gästrikland	300,000	(Sweden) Dennis Edlund (1)
28 Aug	Karlstad Open	Värmland	225,000	(Sweden) Leif Hederström (2)
11 Sep	Västerås Kentab Open	Västmanland	225,000	(Sweden) Johan Ryström (4)
18 Sep	Esab Open	Halland	260,000	(Sweden) Ove Sellberg (2)
2 Oct	Volvo Albatross	Småland	400,000	(Sweden) Nils Lindeblad (2)

== Order of Merit ==
The Order of Merit was based on prize money won during the season, calculated in Swedish krona.

Position	Player	Prize money (SKr)
1	(Sweden) Jesper Parnevik	243,100
2	(Sweden) Carl-Magnus Strömberg	193,000
3	(Sweden) Johan Ryström	187,650
4	(Norway) Per Haugsrud	165,650
5	(Sweden) Mikael Krantz	159,400

== See also ==
- 1988 Swedish Golf Tour (women)
