= Philip Scrutton =

English golfer (1923–1958)

Personal information
- Full name: Philip Furse Scrutton
- Nationality: England
- Born: 1923 England
- Died: 30 October 1958 (aged 35) Hartley Wintney, Hampshire, England

Career
- Sport: Golf
- Status: Amateur

Best results in major championships
- Masters Tournament: DNP
- PGA Championship: DNP
- U.S. Open: DNP
- The Open Championship: CUT: 1958

Philip Furse Scrutton (1923 – 30 October 1958) was an English amateur golfer. He played in the Walker Cup in 1955 and 1957. He was killed in a road traffic accident at the age of 35.

== Golf career ==
Scrutton remains one the few amateur golfers to have won the Brabazon and Berkshire Trophies in the same year, the others being Guy Wolstenholme (1960), Michael Bonallack (1968, 1971), Peter Hedges (1976), Sandy Lyle (1977) and Jeremy Robinson (1987). He is also one of the few amateurs to have won the Brabazon Trophy outright on at least three separate occasions, the others being Michael Bonallack and Ronnie Shade.

At Woodhall Spa in 1954, in a gale of wind and rain, Scrutton produced a brilliant final round to win the Brabazon Trophy. He was seven strokes behind with 9 holes to play. In a thrilling finish he birdied three of the last four holes to win by a stroke. Walton Heath professional Harry Busson, braving the weather, followed Scrutton and said afterwards that it was the greatest round of golf he ever witnessed.

Scrutton reached the semi-final of the Amateur Championship in 1955, losing 5 and 4 to the eventual winner Joe Conrad. The renowned golfing commentator Herbert Warren Wind wrote the following about Scrutton after watching his quarter final match at Royal Lytham:

The more you see of Scrutton, the more he strikes you as a person you expect to bump into only in fiction, so much "in character" are the highly individual manners and mannerisms of this wealthy young man who owns about eight cars and, in pursuit of a first-class golf game, spent the winter of 1951 on the winter circuit in America. Scrutton's woods, just as you would expect, are encased in leopard-skin covers. During his match with Patton he wore an off-yellow sweater with a matching beret and, in addition to his caddy, employed a retainer to carry a folding chair on which he could sit when Patton was shooting. But Scrutton, mechanical as is the delivery of his swing, can play golf, and he ran clear away from Billy Joe, losing the first and then winning eight of the next nine holes and, in due course, the match, 7 and 6.

Partnered with Philomena Garvey, Scrutton won the Worplesdon Mixed Foursomes in 1955. He had reached the final in 1954 with Jean McIntyre, but lost by two holes to Frances Stephens and Tony Slark.

Scrutton competed in the World Championship of Golf held at the Tam O'Shanter Golf Course, Chicago in August 1951. He was the only Briton in the field.

Scrutton was a member at several golf clubs including The Royal and Ancient Golf Club of St Andrews, Sunningdale Golf Club and The Addington Golf Club.

== Death ==
Scrutton died in a road traffic accident on 30 October 1958 aged 35. He was driving a car in which John Pritchett, a leading professional golfer, was a passenger, when they were hit by an army lorry on the A30, just west of Blackbushe Airport, Hampshire. Pritchett was also killed. Scrutton and Pritchett had played together in the 1958 Wentworth Foursomes, losing in the final.

Scrutton was twice married, to Elizabeth Ann Todhunter in 1952 and to Audrey Mary Dubery in 1957. Scrutton was chairman of a firm of stevedores and master porters and an underwriting member of Lloyd's of London. He was a wealthy individual. In 1958 his estate was valued in excess of £600,000 at a time when average annual earnings in the UK were approximately £400.

== Philip Scrutton Jug ==
In 1959 Scrutton's mother and his widow donated the "Philip Scrutton Jug" which is awarded to the player with the lowest combined aggregate over the Brabazon and Berkshire Trophies.

Doug Sewell was the first winner in 1959. He came close to winning the Berkshire Trophy in April, finishing a stroke behind Joe Carr after making a bogey at the final hole. In June Sewell won his second Brabazon Trophy after a playoff with Michael Bonallack. His aggregate score of 580 made him the first winner.

== Tournament wins ==
- 1949 Royal St George's Challenge Cup
- 1950 Berkshire Trophy
- 1951 Berkshire Trophy, Royal St George's Challenge Cup
- 1952 Berkshire Trophy, Brabazon Trophy, Sunningdale Foursomes (with Alan Waters)
- 1954 Brabazon Trophy, Sunningdale Foursomes (with Alan Waters)
- 1955 Brabazon Trophy, Royal St George's Challenge Cup, Worplesdon Mixed Foursomes (with Philomena Garvey)
- 1956 Wentworth Amateur-Professional Foursomes (with Bob French), Prince Of Wales Challenge Cup (Royal Cinque Ports Golf Club)
- 1957 Royal St George's Challenge Cup, George Hillyard Trophy (West Sussex GC)
- 1958 Royal St George's Challenge Cup (Tournament won by Jack Nicklaus in 1959), The Hampshire Hog (North Hants GC)

Other notable results:

- 1949 Runner-up in the French Open Amateur Championship
- 1957 Runner-up in the Silver Medal (The R&A Spring Meeting)

== Results in major championships ==
Tournament	1946	1947	1948	1949	1950	1951	1952	1953	1954	1955	1956	1957	1958
The Amateur Championship	R128		R128		R64	R64	R512			SF	R32	R16	R16
The Open Championship													CUT
U.S. Amateur												R128	

Note: Scrutton only played in the Amateur Championship, the Open Championship and the U.S. Amateur.

Top 10
Did not play

CUT = Missed the cut
R512, R256, R128, R64, R32, R16, QF, SF = Round in which player lost in match play

== Team appearances ==
- Walker Cup (representing Great Britain & Ireland): 1955, 1957
- Amateurs–Professionals Match (representing the Amateurs): 1956, 1957
