= Jeremy Robinson (golfer) =

English golfer (born 1966)

Personal information
- Full name: Jeremy Gordon Robinson
- Nationality: England
- Born: 21 January 1966 (age 60) Scarborough, England
- Height: 6 ft 1 in (1.85 m)
- Weight: 189 lb (86 kg; 13.5 st)

Career
- Sport: Golf
- College: Florida State University
- Turned professional: 1987
- Former tours: European Tour; Challenge Tour
- Professional wins: 5

Number of wins by tour
- Challenge Tour: 5 (Tied-8th all-time)

Best results in major championships
- Masters Tournament: DNP
- PGA Championship: DNP
- U.S. Open: DNP
- The Open Championship: T58: 1999

Jeremy Gordon Robinson (born 21 January 1966) is an English professional golfer.

== Early life ==
In 1966, Robinson was born in Scarborough, England. He learned golf as a junior member at Woodhall Spa Golf Club in Lincolnshire where his father and brother were also members at the time. He was a talented junior golfer and won the Peter McEvoy Trophy in 1982.

== Amateur career ==
Robinson studied Economics at Florida State University in the United States where he was twice named Most Outstanding Athlete in the Metro Conference. In 1987, he won the Brabazon Trophy, Berkshire Trophy, and Philip Scrutton Jug. That year, he also represented Great Britain and Ireland in the Walker Cup (with a 2–2–0 record). Robinson is one of the few amateur golfers to have won both The Berkshire and Brabazon Trophies in the same calendar year, the others being Philip Scrutton (1952), Guy Wolstenholme (1960), Michael Bonallack (1968, 1971), Peter Hedges (1976) and Sandy Lyle (1977).

== Professional career ==
In 1987, Robinson turned pro. He played on the European Tour and the developmental Challenge Tour between 1988 and 2002. Robinson played in over 250 European Tour events. He had most success on the Challenge Tour where he won five tournaments. In 2009, he represented Great Britain and Ireland in the 2009 PGA Cup. Since leaving the tour he has worked as a teaching professional, and is also a partner in Sports Masters International.

Robinson is now a Director of BlackStar Golf and a member of European Senior Tour. His eldest son Ben Robinson is now a professional golfer having graduated from Louisiana Tech University.

== Amateur wins ==
- 1982 Peter McEvoy Trophy
- 1985 Lagonda Trophy, Lincolnshire Amateur Championship
- 1986 North of England Open Amateur Youth Championship
- 1987 Brabazon Trophy, Berkshire Trophy, Scrutton Jug

== Professional wins (5) ==
=== Challenge Tour wins (5) ===
| No. | Date | Tournament | Winning score | Margin of victory | Runner(s)-up |
|---|---|---|---|---|---|
| 1 | 1989 | Air France Trophy | | | |
| 2 | 8 Jun 1989 | Old Links Satellite | −7 (67-68-64=209)* | 1 stroke | (Scotland) Adam Hunter |
| 3 | 27 Jan 1991 | Kenya Open | −15 (68-62-69-70=269) | 1 stroke | (Wales) Paul Affleck, (England) Philip Golding, (Scotland) Sandy Stephen |
| 4 | 19 Jan 1992 | Zambia Open | −8 (70-74-71-69=284) | Playoff | (Sweden) Mathias Grönberg, (England) Mark Nichols |
| 5 | 31 May 1992 | Open de Dijon Bourgogne | −8 (69-72-68-71=280) | 1 stroke | (United States) Charles Raulerson |

Challenge Tour playoff record (1–1)

| No. | Year | Tournament | Opponents | Result |
|---|---|---|---|---|
| 1 | 1992 | Zambia Open | (Sweden) Mathias Grönberg, (England) Mark Nichols | Won with birdie on first extra hole |
| 2 | 1992 | Open des Volcans | (England) Craig Cassells, (Sweden) Mikael Krantz, (United States) Ronald Stelten | |

== Results in major championships ==
| Tournament | 1986 | 1987 | 1988 | 1989 | 1990 | 1991 | 1992 | 1993 | 1994 | 1995 | 1996 | 1997 | 1998 | 1999 |
|---|---|---|---|---|---|---|---|---|---|---|---|---|---|---|
| The Open Championship | CUT | CUT | | | | | CUT | | | | | | | T58 |

Robinson only played in The Open Championship.

Did not play

CUT = missed the half-way cut
"T" = tied

== Team appearances ==
Amateur

- Jacques Léglise Trophy (representing Great Britain & Ireland): 1983 (winners)
- European Amateur Team Championship (representing England): 1987
- Walker Cup (representing Great Britain & Ireland): 1987
- England at Under 18, Under 21 and Men's Team

Professional

- PGA Cup (representing Great Britain & Ireland): 2009

== See also ==
- List of golfers with most Challenge Tour wins
