= Royal Golf Club Mariánské Lázně =

Golf club in the Czech Republic

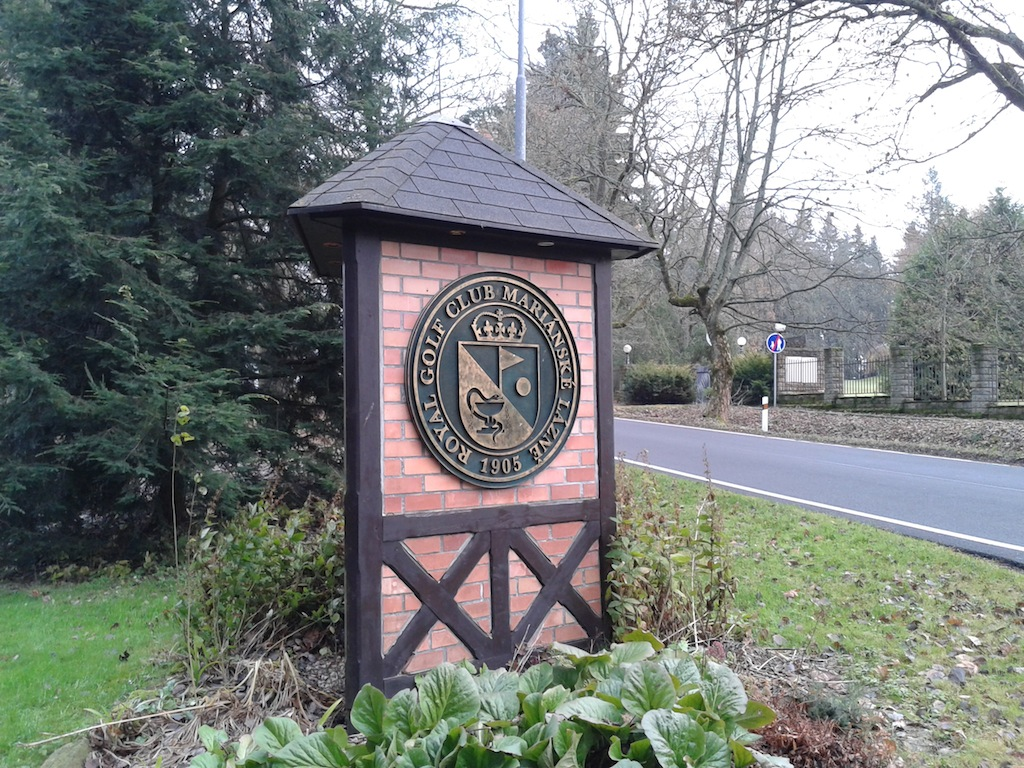

- Location in Czech Republic
- 49.9792°N 12.7364°E

Club information
- Location: Mariánské Lázně, Czech Republic
- Established: 1905, 121 years ago
- Type: Public
- Tota holes: 18
- Tournaments: Czechoslovak Open; Czech Open
- Website: golfml.cz

Old Course
- Designed by: Robert Doig
- Par: 72
- Length: 6,135 metres (6,709 yd)

Royal Golf Club Mariánské Lázně, also known as Royal Marienbad Golf Club, is a golf club in the spa town of Mariánské Lázně (German: Marienbad) in the Karlovy Vary Region of the Czech Republic.

== History ==
The club, one of the oldest in Central Europe, was at the time of its founding located in the empire of Austria-Hungary. Marienbad, as it was then known, enjoyed a golden era as one of the Great Spa Towns of Europe, where many celebrities and European rulers came to enjoy the curative carbon dioxide springs. The original 9-hole golf course and clubhouse were opened in 1905, in response to numerous requests from western spa guests. The course was built according to plans by Robert Doig of Musselburgh, Scotland, and sits at an elevation of 787 meters above sea level.

King Edward VII, who financially supported the club, together with the British ambassador to Vienna, became two of club's first members. The first game at the newly opened 9-hole course was played on 1 June 1905, while the clubhouse opening ceremony took place on 21 August 1905, in the presence of Edward VII. A tournament was also organised, with prizes donated by the king.

The course was presented at the Imperial Austrian Exhibition world's fair held at Earl's Court in London in 1906., where the special Marienbad section featured a relief model of the course. The club became popular particularly among the English and American guests, and some noteworthy visitors to the club in the summer months included British Prime Minister David Lloyd George, his friend Lord Reading, and Rudyard Kipling.

The course was extended to 18 holes in 1923. Queen Elisabeth II bestowed Royal status on the club in February 2003, and Prince Edward, Earl of Wessex visited the course to mark its centennial in 2005.

== Notable members ==
Members include Alex Čejka, who has won two majors on the PGA Tour Champions, and tennis legend turned golfer Ivan Lendl.

== Notable tournaments hosted ==
The club has hosted both amateur and professional international championships, including the Czechoslovak Open in the 1930s and the Czech Open on the European Tour in the 1990s.

=== Professional ===
Year	Tour	Tournament	Winner	Ref
1935		Czechoslovak Open	(England) Mark Seymour	
1936		Czechoslovak Open	(England) Mark Seymour	
1937		Czechoslovak Open	(England) Henry Cotton	
1992	CHA	Playboy Charity Challenge	(Australia) Lucien Tinkler	
1993	CHA	Corfin Charity Challenge	(England) Ian Spencer	
1994	EUR	Chemapol Trophy Czech Open	(Sweden) Per-Ulrik Johansson	
1995	EUR	Chemapol Trophy Czech Open	(United States) Peter Teravainen	
1996	EUR	Chemapol Trophy Czech Open	(England) Jonathan Lomas	
1997	EUR	Chemapol Trophy Czech Open	(Germany) Bernhard Langer	

=== Amateur ===
- European Youths' Team Championship – 1979
- European Amateur Team Championship – 1993
- St Andrews Trophy – 2006
- Jacques Léglise Trophy – 2006
