= Ashridge Golf Club =

Golf club in Little Gaddesden, England

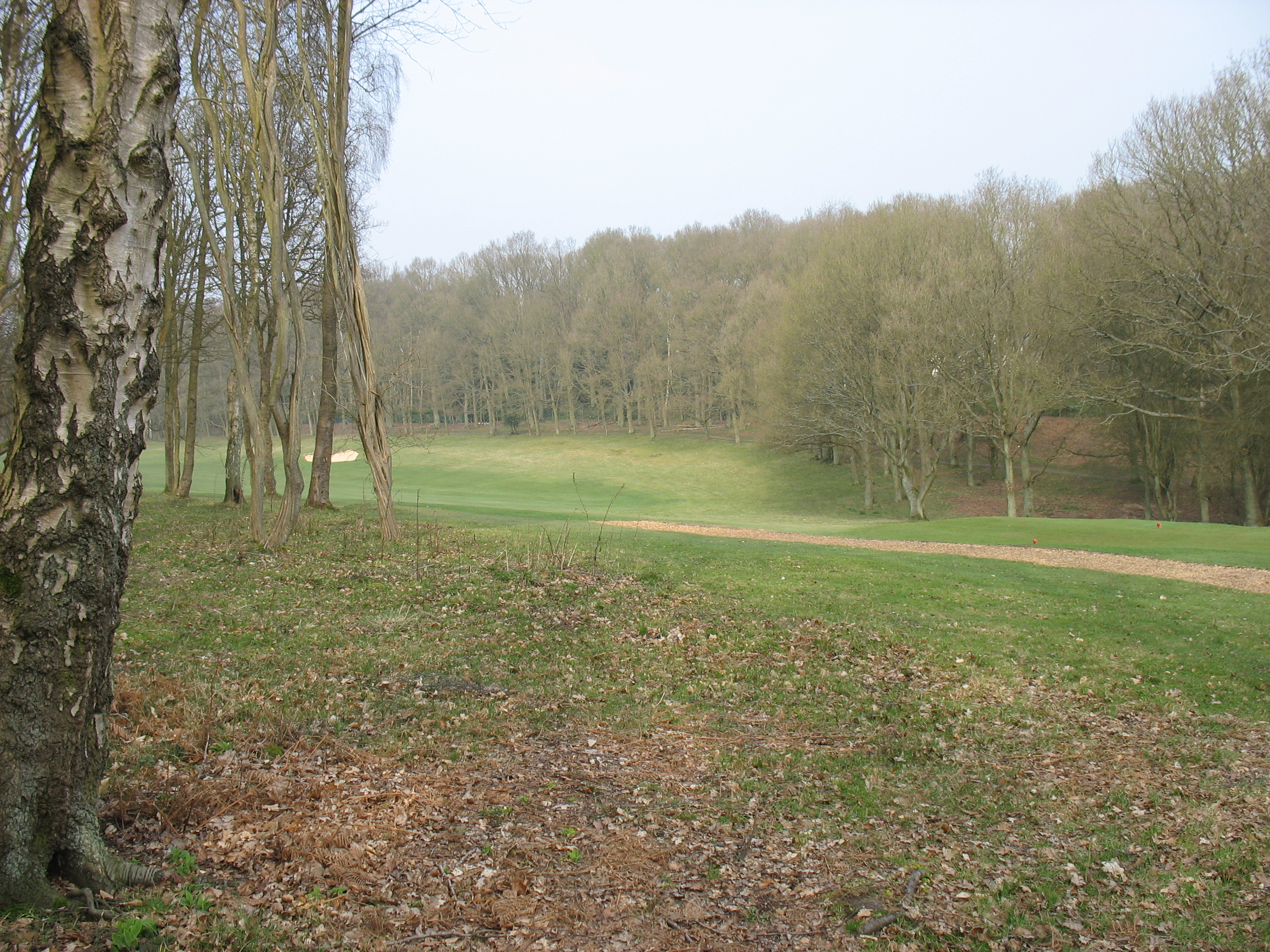

- Location within Hertfordshire
- 51.81°N 0.57°W

Club information
- Location: Little Gaddesden, Hertfordshire, England
- Established: 1932
- Tota holes: 18

Ashridge Golf Club, also Ashridge Artisans Golf Club, is a golf club in Little Gaddesden, on the border of Hertfordshire and Bedfordshire, England, 2.5 miles south along the B4506 road from Dagnall, Buckinghamshire, and five miles northwest of Berkhamsted. It was established in 1932 on the Ashridge Estate. The club has hosted the numerous PGA events and hosted the Open Championship' Regional Qualifying Competition for six years between 2003 and 2008. The course measures 6,663 yards. A new clubhouse was built to accommodate for the Open Championship qualifiers in 2003.

Sir Henry Cotton was a Professional at the club in the late thirties during which time he won the 1937 Open at Carnoustie. The 337 yard 9th is nicknamed "Cottons" in his honour. Between 1964 and 1976, former golfer and golf commentator Alex Hay spent 12 years as Professional at the club.
