= 1991 Open Championship =

Coordinates: 53.622°N 3.033°W

Tournament information
- Dates: 18–21 July 1991
- Location: Southport, England
- Course: Royal Birkdale Golf Club
- Tour(s): European Tour; PGA Tour

Statistics
- Par: 70
- Length: 6,940 yards (6,346 m)
- Field: 156 players, 113 after cut
- Cut: 148 (+8)
- Prize fund: £900,000 $1,512,000
- Winner's share: £90,000 $151,200

Champion
- (Australia) Ian Baker-Finch
- 272 (−8)

Location in England
Location in Southport, Merseyside,
north of Liverpool, England

The 1991 Open Championship was a men's major golf championship and the 120th Open Championship, held from 18 to 21 July at Royal Birkdale Golf Club in Southport, England. Ian Baker-Finch won his only major championship, two strokes ahead of runner-up Mike Harwood.

Baker-Finch was two-over after two rounds in a tie for 28th place, then was ten-under on the weekend. His 66 on Sunday was bolstered by a 29 on the front nine, with birdies on five of the first seven holes.

The cut at 148 (+8) included those within ten strokes of the lead, which resulted in a record 113 players on the weekend, nearly three-quarters of the field.

== Course ==
Hole	1	2	3	4	5	6	7	8	9	Out	10	11	12	13	14	15	16	17	18	In	Total
Yards	448	417	409	203	346	473	156	458	414	3,324	395	409	184	475	199	543	414	525	472	3,616	6,940
Par	4	4	4	3	4	4	3	4	4	34	4	4	3	4	3	5	4	5	4	36	70

Lengths of the course for previous Opens (since 1950):

- 1983: 6,968 yards (6,372 m), par 71
- 1976: 7,001 yards (6,402 m), par 72
- 1971: 7,080 yards (6,470 m), par 73
- 1965: 7,037 yards (6,435 m), par 73
- 1961: 6,844 yards (6,258 m)
- 1954: 6,867 yards (6,279 m)

== Round summaries ==
=== First round ===
Thursday, 18 July 1991

Place	Player	Score	To par
1	(Spain) Seve Ballesteros	66	−4
T2	(United States) Chip Beck	67	−3
T2	(England) Martin Gates	67	−3
T2	(Spain) Santiago Luna	67	−3
T5	(England) Nick Faldo	68	−2
T5	(United States) Gary Hallberg	68	−2
T5	(Australia) Mike Harwood	68	−2
T5	(England) Barry Lane	68	−2
T5	(Wales) Mark Mouland	68	−2
T5	(United States) Mike Reid	68	−2
T5	(Italy) Costantino Rocca	68	−2

=== Second round ===
Friday, 19 July 1991

Place	Player	Score	To par
T1	(United States) Gary Hallberg	68-70=138	−2
T1	(Australia) Mike Harwood	68-70=138	−2
T1	(Scotland) Andrew Oldcorn	71-67=138	−2
T4	(Spain) Seve Ballesteros	66-73=139	−1
T4	(Australia) Steve Elkington	71-68=139	−1
T4	(England) David Gilford	72-67=139	−1
T4	(Australia) Wayne Grady	69-70=139	−1
T4	(United States) Mark O'Meara	71-68=139	−1
T4	(United States) Mike Reid	68-71=139	−1
T10	(England) Richard Boxall	71-69=140	E
T10	(England) Roger Chapman	74-66=140	E
T10	(England) Howard Clark	71-69=140	E
T10	(England) Mark James	72-68=140	E
T10	(England) Barry Lane	68-72=140	E
T10	(Scotland) Colin Montgomerie	71-69=140	E
T10	(Fiji) Vijay Singh	71-69=140	E

Amateurs: Mickelson (+4), Payne (+4), Allenby (+9), Roblin (+11), Coltart (+13), Evans (+13), Muntz (+14), Wilshire (+15).

=== Third round ===
Saturday, 20 July 1991

Place	Player	Score	To par
T1	(Australia) Ian Baker-Finch	71-71-64=206	−4
T1	(United States) Mark O'Meara	71-68-67=206	−4
T3	(Republic of Ireland) Eamonn Darcy	73-68-66=207	−3
T3	(Australia) Mike Harwood	68-70-69=207	−3
5	(Spain) Seve Ballesteros	66-73-69=208	−2
T6	(United States) Mike Reid	68-71-70=209	−1
T6	(Fiji) Vijay Singh	71-69-69=209	−1
T8	(England) Mark James	72-68-70=210	E
T8	(Wales) Mark Mouland	68-74-68=210	E
T8	(Australia) Craig Parry	71-70-69=210	E
T8	(England) Martin Poxon	71-72-67=210	E

=== Final round ===
Sunday, 21 July 1991

Place	Player	Score	To par	Money (£)
1	(Australia) Ian Baker-Finch	71-71-64-66=272	−8	90,000
2	(Australia) Mike Harwood	68-70-69-67=274	−6	70,000
T3	(United States) Fred Couples	72-69-70-64=275	−5	55,000
T3	(United States) Mark O'Meara	71-68-67-69=275	−5	55,000
T5	(Republic of Ireland) Eamonn Darcy	73-68-66-70=277	−3	34,167
T5	(United States) Jodie Mudd	72-70-72-63=277	−3	34,167
T5	(United States) Bob Tway	75-66-70-66=277	−3	34,167
8	(Australia) Craig Parry	71-70-69-68=278	−2	27,500
T9	(Spain) Seve Ballesteros	66-73-69-71=279	−1	22,833
T9	(Germany) Bernhard Langer	71-71-70-67=279	−1	22,833
T9	(Australia) Greg Norman	74-68-71-66=279	−1	22,833

Amateurs: Payne (+4), Mickelson (+8)
