= The Halford Hewitt =

United Kingdom golf tournament

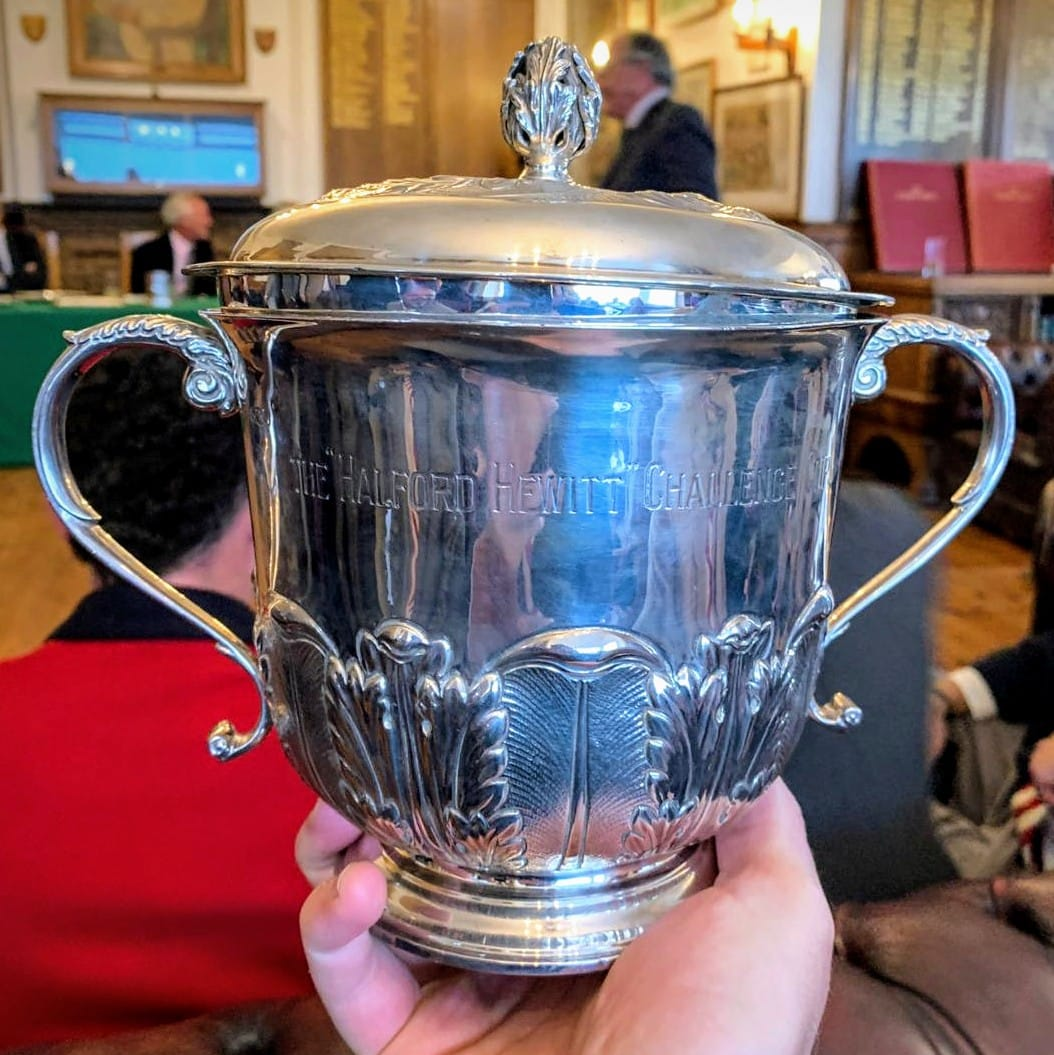
The Halford Hewitt Cup trophy, awarded to the winning team each year.

Founded in 1924, The Halford Hewitt is a highly competitive golf tournament in Britain, where teams of 10 former pupils from the 64 schools that comprise the Public Schools Golfing Society compete. Each school fields five foursomes pairs, making 640 competitors in all. It is the largest scratch amateur event in the world in terms of starting competitors.

The Halford Hewitt has been described by the golf writer Nick Tremayne as ‘the greatest of all truly amateur tournaments’.

== The Competitions ==
The Halford Hewitt Cup: teams of five pairs of golfers playing scratch foursomes knockout match play.

The Peter Kenyon Bowl: a handicap foursomes stableford competition open all members of an appropriate Old Boys Golf Society.

The Prince's Plate: a scratch foursomes knockout for first round losers in the main competition.

== The Courses ==
The Royal Cinque Ports Golf Club is a primary host of the Halford Hewitt tournament. The links course is noted for the difficulty of its final seven holes.

As the competition expanded beyond the capacity of a single club in 1950, the Royal St Georges Golf Club was invited to assist, and since then, half the field has played its initial two rounds at the Royal St Georges Golf Club.

In addition to the main event, the Peter Kenyon bowl has traditionally been held as a consolation competition that welcomes both competitors and spectators. This tournament is played at the Princes Golf Club.

More recently, in 2001, a knockout plate competition was introduced with the same format as the Hewitt, featuring teams composed of three pairs of golfers. This tournament takes place at the Princes Golf Club.

== The Halford Hewitt Cup Results ==
| Year | Winner | Runner-up | Score |
|---|---|---|---|
| 1924 | Eton | Winchester | 4 to 1 |
| 1925 | Eton | Harrow | 3 to 2 |
| 1926 | Eton | Winchester | 3 to 2 |
| 1927 | Harrow | Rugby | 3.5 to 1.5 |
| 1928 | Eton | Charterhouse | 3 to 2 |
| 1929 | Harrow | Charterhouse | 4 to 1 |
| 1930 | Charterhouse | Uppingham | 4 to 1 |
| 1931 | Harrow | Winchester | 3 to 2 |
| 1932 | Charterhouse | Rugby | 3.5 to 1.5 |
| 1933 | Rugby | Harrow | 3 to 2 |
| 1934 | Charterhouse | Watson's | 4 to 1 |
| 1935 | Charterhouse | Shrewsbury | 4 to 1 |
| 1936 | Charterhouse | Rugby | 3.5 to 1.5 |
| 1937 | Charterhouse | Liverpool | 3.5 to 1.5 |
| 1938 | Marlborough | Harrow | 3.5 to 1.5 |
| 1939 | Charterhouse | Harrow | 3 to 2 |
| 1940 | No Competition Held | | |
| 1941 | No Competition Held | | |
| 1942 | No Competition Held | | |
| 1943 | No Competition Held | | |
| 1944 | No Competition Held | | |
| 1945 | No Competition Held | | |
| 1946 | No Competition Held | | |
| 1947 | Harrow | Charterhouse | 3.5 to 1.5 |
| 1948 | Winchester | Watson's | 3 to 2 |
| 1949 | Charterhouse | Rugby | 3 to 2 |
| 1950 | Rugby | Stowe | 3 to 2 |
| 1951 | Rugby | Harrow | 3 to 2 |
| 1952 | Harrow | Rossall | 4 to 1 |
| 1953 | Harrow | Watson's | 4 to 1 |
| 1954 | Rugby | Wellington | 3 to 2 |
| 1955 | Eton | Harrow | 3.5 to 1.5 |
| 1956 | Eton | Rugby | 3.5 to 1.5 |
| 1957 | Watson's | Harrow | 3 to 2 |
| 1958 | Harrow | Charterhouse | 3 to 2 |
| 1959 | Wellington | Charterhouse | 3 to 2 |
| 1960 | Rossall | Fettes | 4 to 1 |
| 1961 | Rossall | Rugby | 4 to 1 |
| 1962 | Oundle | Stowe | 3 to 2 |
| 1963 | Repton | Fettes | 3 to 2 |
| 1964 | Fettes | Shrewsbury | 3.5 to 1.5 |
| 1965 | Rugby | Merchiston | 3.5 to 1.5 |
| 1966 | Charterhouse | Malvern | 4 to 1 |
| 1967 | Eton | Wellington | 4 to 1 |
| 1968 | Eton | Cranleigh | 3 to 2 |
| 1969 | Eton | Uppingham | 4 to 1 |
| 1970 | Merchiston | Harrow | 3.5 to 1.5 |
| 1971 | Charterhouse | Marlborough | 3 to 2 |
| 1972 | Marlborough | Harrow | 4.5 to 0.5 |
| 1973 | Rossall | Loretto | 3 to 2 |
| 1974 | Charterhouse | Rugby | 4 to 1 |
| 1975 | Harrow | Merchant Taylors' | 3.5 to 1.5 |
| 1976 | Merchiston | Whitgift | 3 to 2 |
| 1977 | Watson's | Marlborough | 4.5 to 0.5 |
| 1978 | Harrow | Stowe | 3.5 to 1.5 |
| 1979 | Stowe | Marlborough | 3.5 to 1.5 |
| 1980 | Shrewsbury | Epsom | 4.5 to 0.5 |
| 1981 | Watson's | Charterhouse | 3 to 2 |
| 1982 | Charterhouse | Dulwich | 4 to 1 |
| 1983 | Charterhouse | Shrewsbury | 3 to 2 |
| 1984 | Charterhouse | Malvern | 3 to 2 |
| 1985 | Harrow | Shrewsbury | 4 to 1 |
| 1986 | Repton | Malvern | 3 to 2 |
| 1987 | Merchiston | Tonbridge | 3.5 to 1.5 |
| 1988 | Stowe | Bradfield | 4.5 to 0.5 |
| 1989 | Eton | Shrewsbury | 3 to 2 |
| 1990 | Tonbridge | Malvern | 3 to 2 |
| 1991 | Shrewsbury | Lancing | 3.5 to 1.5 |
| 1992 | Tonbridge | Malvern | 3.5 to 1.5 |
| 1993 | Shrewsbury | Clifton | 3 to 2 |
| 1994 | Tonbridge | Stowe | 3 to 2 |
| 1995 | Harrow | Watson's | 4 to 1 |
| 1996 | Radley | Malvern | 3 to 2 |
| 1997 | Oundle | Harrow | 3 to 2 |
| 1998 | Charterhouse | Tonbridge | 3 to 2 |
| 1999 | Watson's | Tonbridge | 3 to 2 |
| 2000 | Epsom | Merchiston | 3.5 to 1.5 |
| 2001 | Tonbridge | Bradfield | 3 to 2 |
| 2002 | Charterhouse | Whitgift | 3 to 2 |
| 2003 | Edinburgh | Charterhouse | 3.5 to 1.5 |
| 2004 | Tonbridge | Malvern | 3 to 2 |
| 2005 | Tonbridge | Rossall | 4 to 1 |
| 2006 | Malvern | Sherborne | 3 to 2 |
| 2007 | Watson's | Epsom | 4.5 to 0.5 |
| 2008 | Tonbridge | Malvern | 4 to 1 |
| 2009 | Tonbridge | Merchant Taylors' | 3 to 2 |
| 2010 | Clifton | Charterhouse | 3 to 2 |
| 2011 | Watson's | Malvern | 3.5 to 1.5 |
| 2012 | Charterhouse | Epsom | 3 to 2 |
| 2013 | Eton | Tonbridge | 3 to 2 |
| 2014 | Merchiston | Bradfield | 4.5 to 0.5 |
| 2015 | Eton | Kings, Canterbury | 4.5 to 0.5 |
| 2016 | Tonbridge | Radley | 3 to 2 |
| 2017 | Epsom | Ampleforth | 4 to 1 |
| 2018 | Winchester | Ampleforth | 4 to 1 |
| 2019 | Malvern | Ampleforth | 3 to 2 |
| 2020 | No Competition Held | | |
| 2021 | Loretto | Sherborne | 4.5 to 0.5 |
| 2022 | Loretto | Tonbridge | 3.5 to 1.5 |
| 2023 | Loretto | Epsom | 3 to 2 |
| 2024 | Eton | Bedford | 4 to 1 |
| 2025 | Bradfield | Winchester | 3.5 to 1.5 |
| 2026 | Rossall | Winchester | 4 to 1 |

== The Prince's Plate Results ==
| Year | Winner | Runner-up |
|---|---|---|
| 2001 | Charterhouse | Uppingham |
| 2002 | Marlborough | Ampleforth |
| 2003 | Tonbridge | St. Paul's |
| 2004 | Bradfield | Rugby |
| 2005 | Wellington | Chigwell |
| 2006 | Epsom | Repton |
| 2007 | Liverpool | Harrow |
| 2008 | Whitgift | Berkhamsted |
| 2009 | Ampleforth | Rossall |
| 2010 | Radley | Edinburgh AC |
| 2011 | Canford | Winchester |
| 2012 | Loretto | Hurstpierpoint |
| 2013 | Haileybury | The Leys |
| 2014 | Edinburgh AC | Ampleforth |
| 2015 | Sherborne | Epsom |
| 2016 | The Leys | Merchiston |
| 2017 | Merchant Taylors' | Bedford |
| 2018 | Malvern | Edinburgh AC |
| 2019 | Lancing | Epsom |
| 2020 | No Competition Held | |
| 2021 | Epsom | Hurstpierpoint |
| 2022 | Uppingham | The Leys |
| 2023 | Bedford | Forest |
| 2024 | Forest | Epsom |
| 2025 | Radley | Eton |
| 2026 | Radley | Bedford |
