= Anders Gillner =

Swedish professional golfer

Personal information
- Nationality: Sweden
- Born: 6 August 1967 (age 59) Västerås, Sweden
- Height: 6 ft 0 in (1.83 m)

Career
- Sport: Golf
- Turned professional: 1988
- Former tours: European Tour; Challenge Tour
- Professional wins: 3

Number of wins by tour
- Challenge Tour: 3

Best results in major championships
- Masters Tournament: DNP
- PGA Championship: DNP
- U.S. Open: DNP
- The Open Championship: CUT: 1994

Anders Gillner (born 6 August 1967) is a Swedish former professional golfer who played on the European Tour.

Gillner represented Sweden at the 1984 European Boys' Team Championship at the Royal St George's Golf Club. He turned professional in 1988 and played on the Swedish Golf Tour where he won the Wermland Open and Swedish International Stroke Play Championship – Aragon Open in 1989, and was runner-up at the 1988 Swedish Matchplay Championship and 1991 Västerås Open.

Turning his attention to Europe, on the 1992 Challenge Tour Gillner had 9 top-10 finishes, including third place at Club Med Open in Bogogno, runner-up at the Audi Quattro Trophy one stroke behind Pierre Fulke, and winning the season-ending Tessali Open in Italy after a playoff with Baldovino Dassù, finishing 8th on the Challenge Tour ranking.

Playing on the European Tour 1993–1997, the 1993 season was his best. He finished 73rd on the Order of Merit after coming close to securing his maiden win at Turespana Iberia Open de Baleares, beaten by Jim Payne in a playoff. He played in the 1994 Open Championship at Turnberry.

== Professional wins (3) ==
=== Challenge Tour wins (3) ===
No.	Date	Tournament	Winning score	Margin of victory	Runner(s)-up
1	9 Jul 1989	Wermland Open	−7 (72-68-70-71=281)	1 stroke	(Sweden) Anders Haglund, (Norway) Per Haugsrud, (Sweden) Peter Hedblom, (Sweden) Jon Heimer, (Sweden) Olle Nordberg
2	17 Sep 1989	SI Aragon Open	−7 (71-72-67-67=277)	2 strokes	(Sweden) Mikael Högberg, (Sweden) Stephen Lindskog, (England) Jeremy Robinson
3	12 Apr 1992	Tessali Open	−5 (69-72-69-69=279)	Playoff	(Italy) Baldovino Dassù

== Playoff record ==
European Tour playoff record (0–1)

No.	Year	Tournament	Opponent	Result
1	1993	Turespaña Iberia Open de Baleares	(England) Jim Payne	Lost to par on first extra hole

== Results in major championships ==
Tournament	1994
The Open Championship	CUT

CUT = missed the halfway cut
Note: Gillner only played in The Open Championship.

== Team appearances ==
Amateur

- European Boys' Team Championship (representing Sweden): 1985
