= 1989 Challenge Tour =

Golf tour season

1989 Challenge Tour season
- Number of official events: 36
- Most wins: (Sweden) Anders Gillner (2) (Sweden) Mats Lanner (2) (France) Laurent Lassalle (2) (Sweden) Thomas Nilsson (2) (England) Jeremy Robinson (2)
- Rankings: (England) Neal Briggs

The 1989 Challenge Tour, titled as the 1989 Satellite Tour, was the inaugural season of the Challenge Tour, the official development tour to the European Tour.

== Rankings ==
The rankings were based on tournament results during the season, calculated using a points-based system. The top five players on the rankings earned status to play on the 1990 European Tour (Volvo Tour).

Rank	Player	Points
1	(England) Neal Briggs	9,464
2	(Scotland) Peter Smith	9,398
3	(Italy) Costantino Rocca	8,968
4	(Italy) Silvio Grappasonni	7,216
5	(France) Roger Sabarros	6,498

== See also ==
- 1989 Swedish Golf Tour
