= List of golf courses in the United Kingdom =

This is a list of notable golf courses in the United Kingdom.

== England ==
=== Bedfordshire ===
- Ashridge Golf Club
- Aspley Guise & Woburn Sands Golf Club
- Bedford & County Golf Club
- Bedfordshire Golf Club
- Dunstable Downs Golf Club
- John O'Gaunt Golf Club
- Leighton Buzzard Golf Club
- South Beds Golf Club

=== Berkshire ===
- Bearwood Lakes Golf Club
- East Berkshire Golf Club
- Goring & Streatley Golf Club
- Maidenhead Golf Club
- Newbury & Crookham Golf Club
- Royal Ascot Golf Club
- Sunningdale Golf Club
  - New Course
  - Old Course
- Swinley Forest Golf Club
- Temple Golf Club
- West Berkshire Golf Club

=== Buckinghamshire ===
- Beaconsfield Golf Club
- Buckinghamshire Golf Club
- Burnham Beeches Golf Club
- Gerrards Cross Golf Club
- Harewood Downs Golf Club
- Lambourne Golf Club
- Woburn Golf Club
  - Duchess Course
  - Dukes Course
  - Marquess Course

=== Cambridgeshire ===
- Gog Magog Golf Club
  - Old Course
  - Wandlebury Course

=== Cheshire ===
- Chester Golf Club (Curzon Park)

=== Cornwall and Isles of Scilly ===
- St Mellion International Resort
- Trevose Golf & Country Club

=== Derbyshire ===
- Buxton and High Peak Golf Club
- Cavendish Golf Club

=== Devon ===
- Royal North Devon Golf Club
- Saunton Golf Club
  - East Course
  - West Course

=== Dorset ===
- Ferndown Forest Golf Club
- Meyrick Park Golf Course
- Queen's Park Golf Course

=== County Durham ===
- Blackwell Grange Golf Club
- Hartlepool Golf Club
- Heworth Golf Club (18 holes parkland)
- Seaton Carew Golf Club (22 holes, 5 "courses")
- Stressholme Golf Club
- Woodham Golf and Country Club
- Wynyard Golf Club

=== East Sussex ===
- East Sussex National Golf Club - Uckfield

=== Essex ===
- Essex Golf & Country Club - Colchester
- Frinton Golf Club - Colchester

=== Greater London ===
- Brent Valley Golf Club - Hanwell
- Hounslow Heath Golf Club - Hounslow
- London Scottish Golf Club - Wimbledon
- Richmond Golf Club - Petersham
- Richmond Park Golf Club - Roehampton
- Riverside Golf Club - Eltham
- Roehampton Club - Roehampton
- Royal Mid Surrey Golf Club - Richmond

=== Greater Manchester ===
- Bury Golf Club - Unsworth
- Chorlton-cum-Hardy Golf Club - Northenden
- Manchester Golf Club - Middleton

=== Hampshire ===
- Army Golf Club - Aldershot
- Gosport and Stokes Bay Golf Club - Haslar
- Southampton City Golf Club - Southampton

=== Hertfordshire ===
- Ashridge Golf Club - Berkhamsted
- Bassingbourn Barracks Golf Club - Royston
- Batchwood Hall Golf Club - St Albans
- Bushey Hall Golf Club - Bushey
- Forest Hills Golf Club (Hertford) - Hertford
- The Grove - Watford
- Hanbury Manor Golf Club - Thundridge
- Harpenden Common Golf Club - Harpenden
- Moor Park Golf Club - Rickmansworth
- Oxhey Golf Club - Watford

=== Kent ===
- Ashford (Kent) Golf Club - Ashford
- Canterbury Golf Club - Canterbury
- Chart Hills Golf Club - Headcorn
- Kingshill Golf Club - West Malling
- Prince's Golf Club - Sandwich
- Royal Cinque Ports Golf Club - Deal
- Royal St George's Golf Club - Sandwich
- The London Golf Club - Sevenoaks

=== Lancashire ===
- Blackpool Park Golf Club - Blackpool
- Darwen Golf Club - Blackburn
- Fairhaven Golf Club - Lytham St Annes
- Lancaster Golf Club - Lancaster
- Lytham Green Drive Golf Club - Lytham St Annes
- Royal Lytham & St Annes Golf Club - Lytham St Annes
- St Annes Old Links Golf Club - St Annes on Sea
- Silverdale Golf Club - Carnforth
- Wilpshire Golf Club - Blackburn

=== Lincolnshire ===
- Woodhall Spa Golf Club - Woodhall Spa

=== Merseyside ===
- Formby Golf Club - Formby
- Hillside Golf Club - Southport
- Huyton & Prescot Golf Club - Huyton
- Prenton Golf Club - Birkenhead
- Royal Birkdale Golf Club - Southport
- Royal Liverpool Golf Club, Hoylake
- Southport and Ainsdale Golf Club - Southport
- Wellington Golf Club - Wirral

=== Norfolk ===
- Hunstanton Golf Club - Old Hunstanton
- Richmond Park Golf Club - Thetford
- Royal West Norfolk Golf Club - King's Lynn
- Sheringham Golf Club - Sheringham

=== Northamptonshire ===
- Collingtree Park Golf Club - Northampton
- Northampton Golf Club - Northampton
- Whittlebury Park - Whittlebury

=== Northumberland ===
- Close House
- Matfen Hall
- Slaley Hall

=== Nottinghamshire ===
- Notts Golf Club (Hollinwell)
- Radcliffe-on-Trent Golf Club

=== Oxfordshire ===
- Frilford Heath Golf Club
  - Blue Course
  - Green Course
  - Red Course
- The Oxfordshire Golf Club

=== Shropshire ===
- Church Stretton Golf Club
- Llanymynech Golf Club

=== Somerset ===
- Burnham & Berrow Golf Club
  - Championship Course
  - Channel Course (9 holes)
- Enmore Park Golf Club
- Long Ashton Golf Club

=== Staffordshire ===
- Little Aston Golf Club

=== Suffolk ===
- Felixstowe Ferry Golf Club - Felixstowe

=== Surrey ===
- Foxhills Golf Club - Ottershaw
- Guildford Golf Club - Guildford
- Oak Park Golf Club - Farnham
- Walton Heath Golf Club - Tadworth
- Wentworth Golf Club - Bagshot

=== Warwickshire ===
- The Belfry
  - Brabazon Course
  - Derby Course
  - PGA National Course
- Forest of Arden Hotel & Country Club

=== West Sussex ===
- Mannings Heath Golf Club - Horsham
- Worthing Golf Club - Worthing

=== Worcestershire ===
- Blackwell Golf Club

=== Yorkshire ===
==== North Yorkshire ====
- Fulford Golf Club - York
- Ganton Golf Club - Scarborough
- Ilkley Golf Club - Ilkley
- Skipton Golf Club - Skipton

==== South Yorkshire ====
- Lindrick Golf Club - Worksop

==== West Yorkshire ====
- Alwoodley Golf Club - Leeds
- Horsforth Golf Club - Horsforth
- Huddersfield Golf Club - Fixby, Huddersfield
- Moor Allerton Golf Club - Leeds
- Moortown Golf Club - Leeds
- Sand Moor Golf Club - Leeds

== Northern Ireland ==
=== County Antrim and Belfast ===
- Balmoral Golf Club - Belfast
- Belvoir Park Golf Club - Belfast
- Cliftonville Golf Club - Belfast
- Dunmurry Golf Club - Dunmurry
- Malone Golf Club - Belfast
- Royal Portrush Golf Club - Portrush

=== County Down ===
- Royal Belfast Golf Club - Holywood
- Royal County Down Golf Club - Newcastle

=== County Londonderry ===
- Moyola Park Golf Club - Castledawson
- Portstewart Golf Club - Portstewart

== Scotland ==
=== Aberdeenshire and Grampian ===
- Aboyne Golf Club - Aboyne
- Buckpool Golf Club - Buckie
- Duff House Royal Golf Club - Banff
- Murcar Links Golf Club - Aberdeen
- Newburgh On Ythan Golf Club - Newburgh
- Peterhead Golf Club - Peterhead
- Portlethen Golf Club - Aberdeen
- Royal Aberdeen Golf Club - Aberdeen

=== Fife ===
- Crail Golfing Society, Balcomie Links - Crail
- Elie Golf Club - Elie and Earlsferry
- Fairmont St Andrews, Kittocks Course - St Andrews
- Old Course at St Andrews - St Andrews
- St Andrews Links, Balgove Course - St Andrews
- Scotscraig Golf Club - Tayport

=== Highland ===
- Moray Golf Club - Lossiemouth
- Nairn Golf Club - Nairn
- Royal Dornoch Golf Club - Dornoch
- Wick Golf Club - Wick

=== Lothians ===
- Broomieknowe Golf Club - Bonnyrigg
- Bruntsfield Links - Edinburgh
- Muirfield - Gullane
- North Berwick Golf Club - Berwick
- The Royal Burgess Golfing Society of Edinburgh - Edinburgh
- Royal Musselburgh Golf Club - Prestonpans
- Tantallon Golf Club - Berwick
- Turnhouse Golf Club - Edinburgh

=== Scottish Borders ===
- Galashiels Golf Club - Galashiels

=== Tayside ===
- King James VI Golf Club - Perth
- Murrayshall Country Estate & Golf Club - Scone
- Panmure Golf Club - Carnoustie
- Royal Perth Golfing Society - Perth

=== West Coast ===
- Erskine Golf Club - Bishopton
- Glasgow Golf Club - Glasgow
- Kilmarnock (Barassie) Golf Club - Troon
- Kirkhill Golf Club - Cambuslang
- Loch Lomond Golf Club - Dunbartonshire
- Machrihanish Golf Club - Campbeltown
- Prestwick Golf Club - Prestwick
- Renfrew Golf Club - Renfrew
- Royal Troon Golf Club - Troon

== Wales ==
=== Cardiff and Vale of Glamorgan ===
- Glamorganshire Golf Club - Penarth
- Llanishen Golf Club - Cardiff
- Radyr Golf Club - Cardiff
- Wenvoe Castle Golf Club -Wenvoe
- Whitchurch Golf Club - Cardiff

=== Carmarthenshire ===
- Glyn Abbey Golf Club - Kidwelly
- Machynys Peninsula Golf Club - Llanelli

=== Denbighshire / Flintshire / Wrexham ===
- Denbigh Golf Club - Denbigh
- Holywell Golf Club - Holywell
- Mold Golf Club - Mold
- Old Padeswood Golf Club - Mold
- Rhyl Golf Club - Rhyl

=== Gwynedd and Conwy ===
- Abergele Golf Club - Abergele
- Abersoch Golf Club - Abersoch
- Nefyn & District Golf Club - Pwllheli

=== Newport / Monmouthshire / Torfaen / Blaenau Gwent ===
- Alice Springs Golf Club - Usk
- Celtic Manor Hotel & Country Club - Newport
- Llanwern Golf Club - Llanwern
- Monmouth Golf Club - Monmouth
- The Rolls of Monmouth Golf Club - Monmouth
- Monmouthshire Golf Club - Abergavenny

=== Powys ===
- Builth Wells Golf Club - Builth Wells
- Cradoc Golf Club - Brecon
- Llandrindod Wells Golf Club - Llandrindod Wells
- Llanymynech Golf Club - Llanymynech

=== Rhondda Cynon Taff / Merthyr Tydfil County Borough / Caerphilly ===
- Aberdare Golf Club - Aberdare
- Caerphilly Golf Club - Caerphilly
- Merthyr Tydfil (Cilsanws) Golf Club - Merthyr Tydfil

=== Swansea / Neath Port Talbot / Bridgend ===
- Inco Golf Club - Swansea
- Langland Bay Golf Club - Swansea
- Royal Porthcawl Golf Club - Porthcawl
- Southerndown Golf Club - Bridgend
