= Listed buildings in Fairfield, Derbyshire =

Fairfield is a district in the town of Buxton in the High Peak district of Derbyshire, England. The district of Fairfield contains nine listed buildings that are recorded in the National Heritage List for England. All the listed buildings are designated at Grade II, the lowest of the three grades, which is applied to "buildings of national importance and special interest". Apart from a church, all the listed buildings are houses, farmhouses or cottages.

== Buildings ==
Name and location	Photograph	Date	Notes
Yhelt Cottage; 53.26392°N 1.89596°W		c. 1600	The cottage is in limestone with gritstone dressings, quoins, and a stone slate roof. There are two storeys, and an L-shaped plan with a later cross-wing. Most of the windows are mullioned with hood moulds. On the front facing the road is a gabled porch with a triangular-headed doorway, and a three-light gabled dormer through the eaves.
Hawthorne Farmhouse; 53.26298°N 1.90103°W		Early 17th century	A farmhouse that has been extended, later a guest house, it is in whitewashed stone with gritstone dressings, a roof of tile and slate, and two storeys. Originally it consisted of a hall and cross-wing, later a staircase extension was added in the angle, and in 1905 a rear wing was added. The entrance front has a square bay window, the other windows are a mix of casements and sashes, and in the staircase extension is a stair window.
Fairfield Vicarage; 53.26377°N 1.90076°W		17th century (possible)	The vicarage, which has been altered and extended, is in rendered and painted stone, and has a stone slate roof with moulded coped gables, kneelers and finials. There are three storeys and a front of three bays, the right bay gabled. On the front is a gabled porch, above it is a single-light windows, and the other windows are mullioned, all with sashes. In the right return is a lean-to porch and similar windows.
Cherry Tree Farmhouse and adjoining house 53.26382°N 1.89714°W		Late 17th century	The building, which was later extended and altered, is in limestone, the house whitewashed, with gritstone dressings, a stone slate roof to the farmhouse and a corrugated asbestos roof to the house, and two storeys. On the front are doorways, one with a porch, and varying windows; some are mullioned, some are casements, and some are sashes.
Elm House and outbuildings 53.26370°N 1.90174°W	—	Late 17th century	A farmhouse, later a private house, and the outbuilding, are in limestone with gritstone dressings, quoins, a roof of tile to the left part, and stone slate to the right, and two storeys. The main block has four bays and a projecting block to the right. There is a central doorway, above which is an oval plaque, and three-light mullioned windows. To the left is a recessed block with two doorways and casement windows, and further to the left is a projecting outbuilding wing.
Dakin Cottage and wall 53.26425°N 1.89311°W	—	1683	A farmhouse, later a private house, it is in limestone with gritstone dressings, quoins, and a stone slate roof with coped gables, kneelers and finials. There are two storeys and a T-shaped plan. The doorway in the west front has a hood on brackets, and the windows vary; some are mullioned, and elsewhere are casements. Attached to the house is an embattled wall including the Dakin crest.
Old Hall Cottages; 53.26358°N 1.89843°W	—	1687	A house, later divided, it is in whitewashed stone with gritstone dressings, quoins, and tile roofs. There are two storeys, and an H-shaped plan, with a six-bay hall range, a cross-wing, a rear wing, and a lean-to between the wings. The windows are mullioned, some with Tudor hood moulds.
5–11 St Peter's Road; 53.26358°N 1.90139°W		Mid 18th century	A row of four stone cottages, whitewashed on the front, with quoins, tiles on the roof of the main range, and Welsh slate on the rear wing. There are two storeys, a main range of eight bays, and a rear wing with a single-storey lean-to. Above the doorways are canopies, and the windows are casements.
St Peter's Church; 53.26428°N 1.90135°W		1839	The porch was added to the church in 1897, followed by the transepts, chancel, vestry and organ chamber in 1901–02. The church is built in millstone grit with a Welsh slate roof, and consists of a nave, north and south transepts, a chancel, a south east vestry, a northeast organ chamber, and a west tower. The tower has three stages, lancet windows, two-light bell openings with Y-tracery, and at the top are moulded cornice battlements and corner pinnacles.
