= Buxton Racecourse =

Former horse racing venue at Buxton in Derbyshire

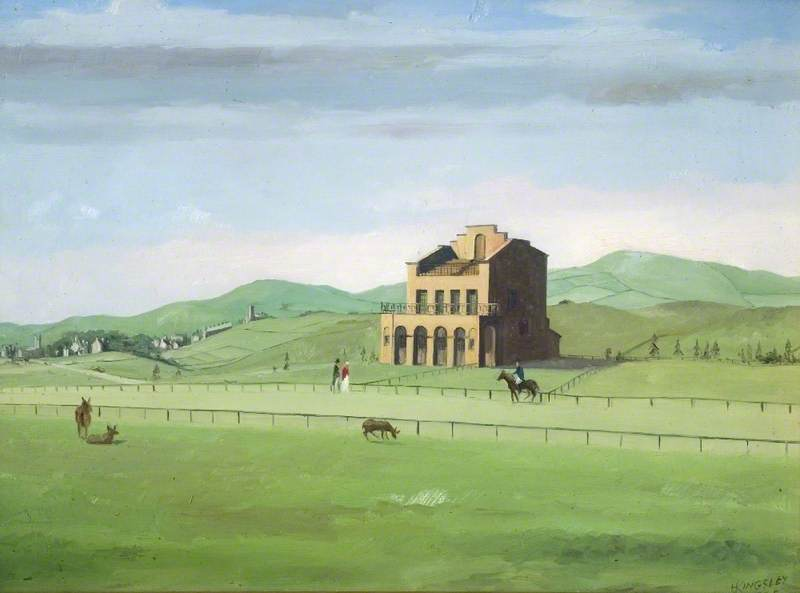
- Race Course on Fairfield Common in 1825 by Harry Kingsley
- Interactive map of Buxton Racecourse
- Location: Fairfield, Derbyshire
- Coordinates: 53.26816°N 1.89889°W
- Owned by: Defunct
- Date opened: Early 1800s
- Date closed: 1840
- Course type: Flat
- Notable races: Duke of Devonshire's Gold Cup

Buxton Racecourse was a horse racing track in the 19th century on Fairfield Common near Buxton in Derbyshire, England. In 1804 an earlier racecourse field was recorded at Heathfield Nook, on the other side of Buxton town.

Fairfield Common was established centuries ago as common grazing land. A racecourse was laid out on the common in the early 1800s. From 1821 racing and county cock fighting meetings were held each summer. The 6th Duke of Devonshire commissioned a grandstand building costing £1,000 which stood in the 1830s. The race programme for the meeting on 16–17 June 1830 lists the Duke of Devonshire's Gold Cup race, The Noblemen's and Gentlemen's Subscription Plate race and the Farmers' Stakes race. That year a mass riot and fight broke out.

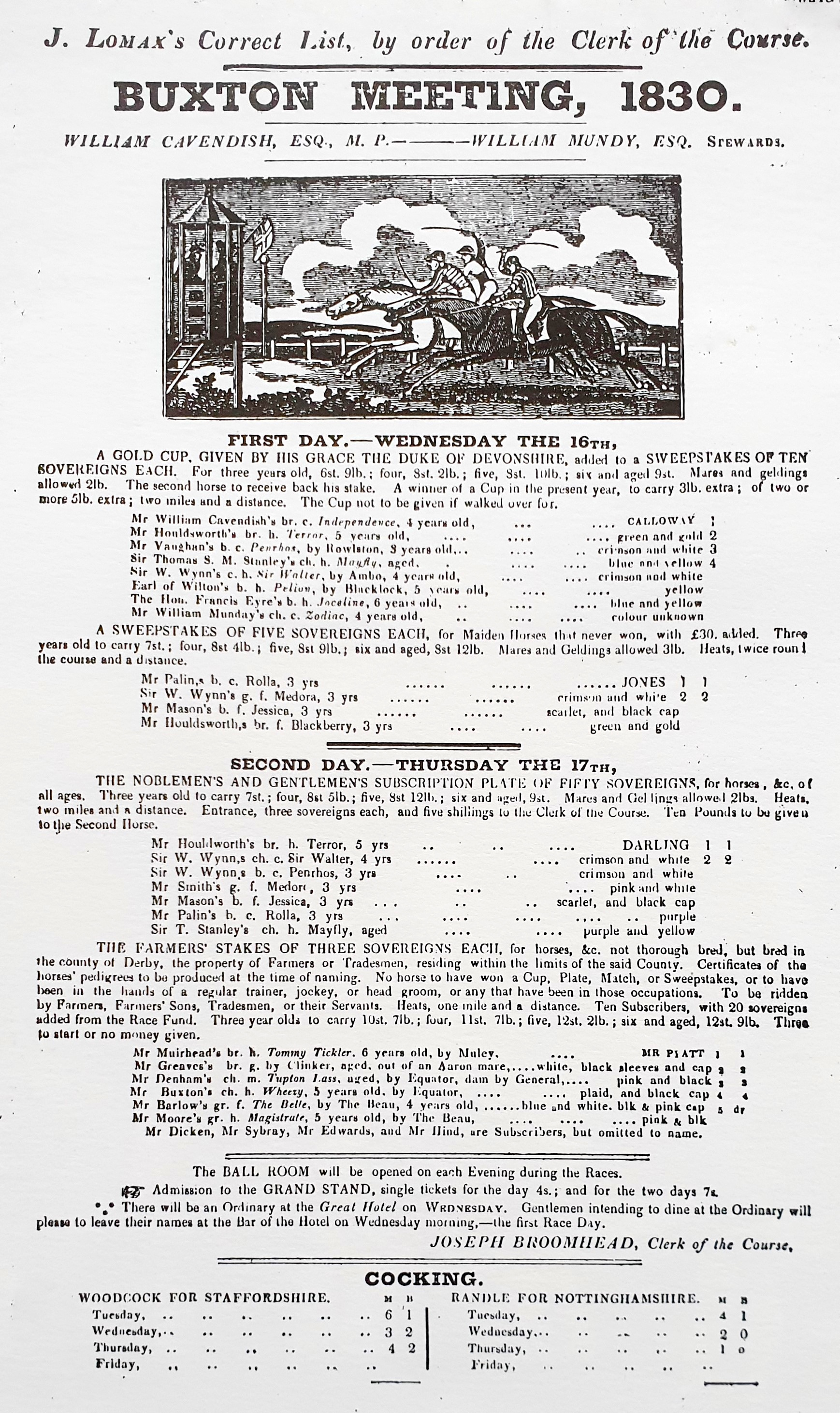
Buxton race meeting programme 16th-17th June 1830

Pigot's Commercial Directory for Derbyshire of 1835 reported:

"On a large tract of waste ground, an excellent round course is formed, where horse-races take place on the Wednesday and Thursday in the week after the meeting at Newton-in-the-Willows; and it is provided with a handsome stand for the accommodation of visitors."

The racecourse closed after the last race meeting in 1840 and the grandstand was subsequently pulled down. Timbers from the stand were reused in the building of the Methodist Chapel at Higher Buxton in 1849. The racetrack's grandstand is shown on the 1841 tithe map of Fairfield and the track itself is shown on an old OS map from c.1830s.

Buxton and High Peak Golf Club was founded in 1887, after a nine-hole course was laid out on Fairfield Common in 1886. The course was extended to 18 holes in 1893. The 9th par 5 hole is called Stand Side, which refers to where the racecourse grandstand once stood.

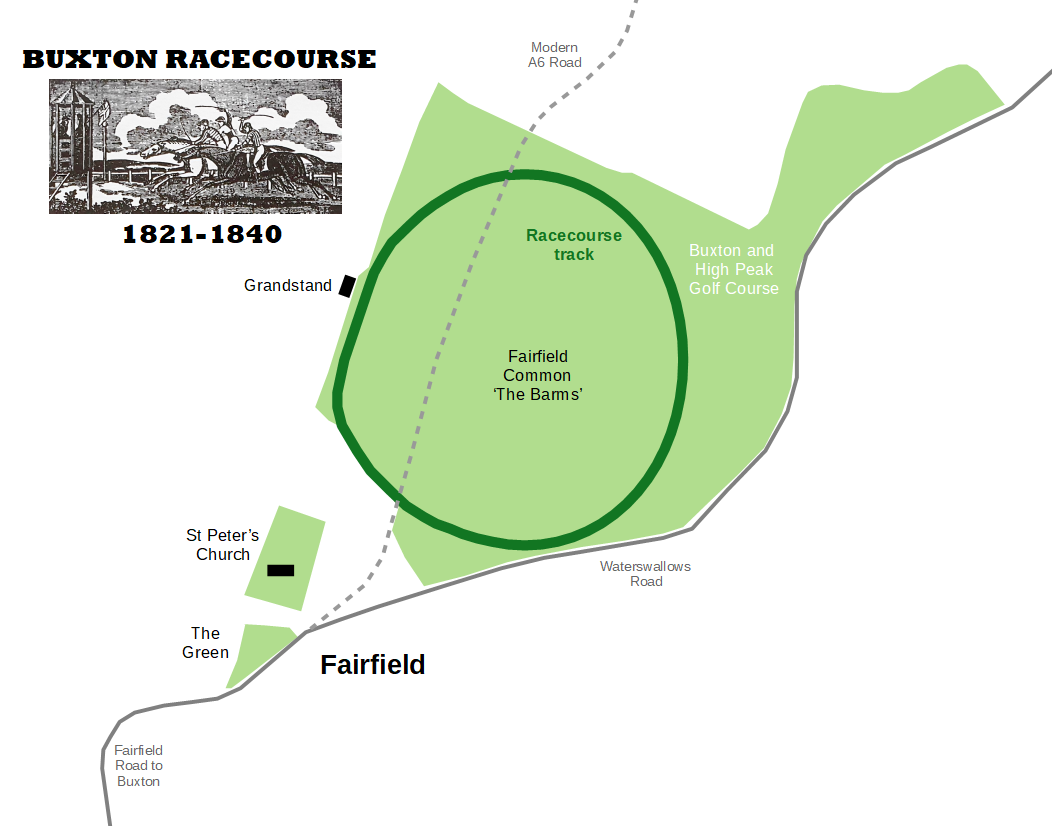

Another local race track is Buxton Raceway, which is a modern oval motorsport track 3 miles south of Buxton. Racing started at the site in 1974 when it was known as 'High Edge'.
