= Cavendish Golf Club =

Golf course in Derbyshire, England

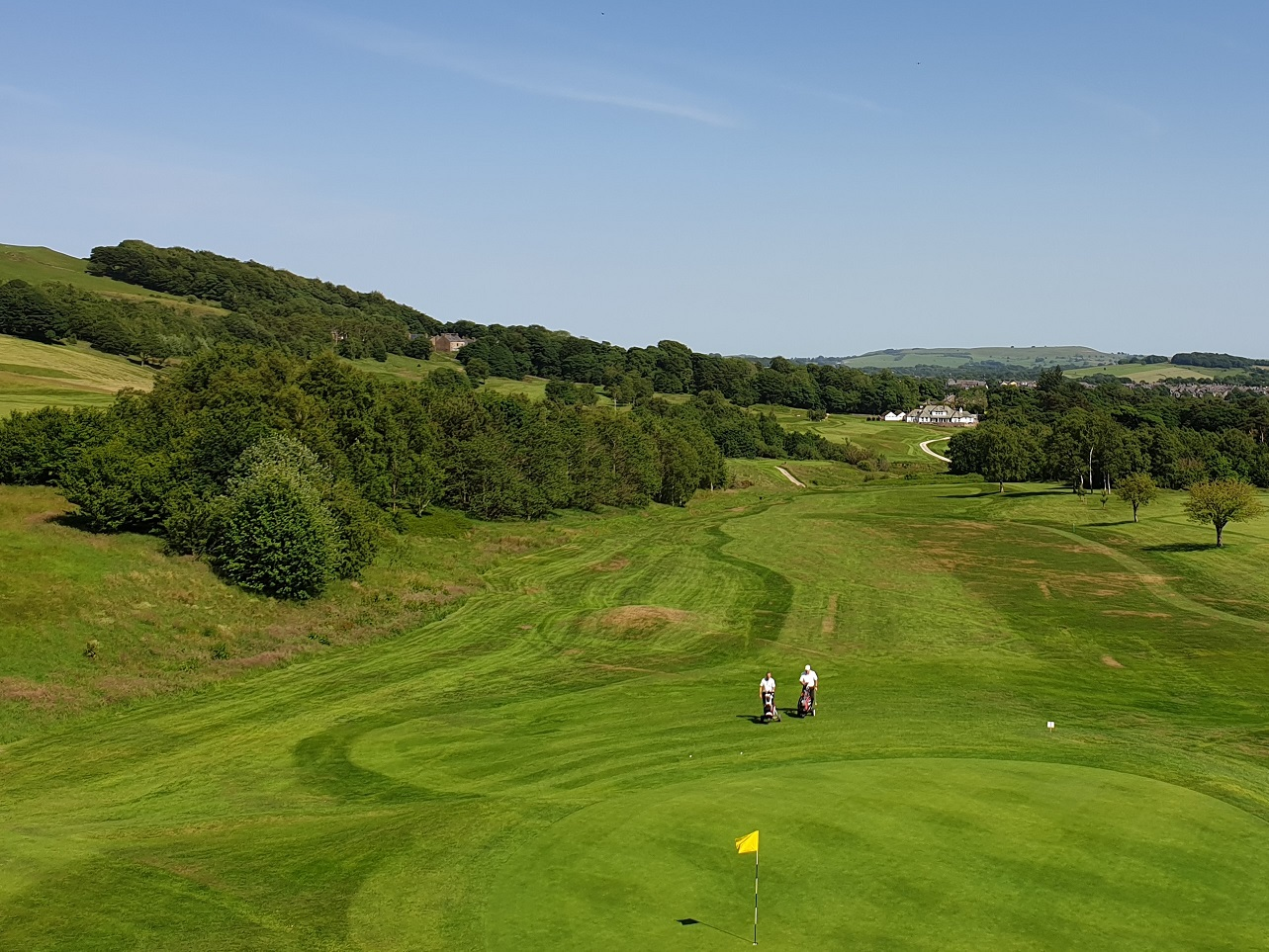
- 5th fairway and clubhouse

- Location in the Borough of High Peak
- 53.2607°N 1.9294°W

Club information
- Location: Buxton, Derbyshire, England
- Elevation: 305-395m
- Established: 1925
- Type: Private
- Tota holes: 18
- Website: https://www.cavendishgolfclub.com/
- Designed by: Alister MacKenzie
- Par: 68
- Length: 5,721 yards (5,231 m)

Cavendish Golf Club in Buxton, Derbyshire, opened in 1925 and was designed by Alister MacKenzie. The course is 5,721 yards (5,231 m) long with a par of 68. It is consistently voted as one of the top 100 golf courses in England.

In 1923, Victor Cavendish, 9th Duke of Devonshire, commissioned Dr Alister MacKenzie to create and build an 18-hole golf course on moorland owned by the Devonshire estate in Buxton. The course was open to men and women from its opening in 1925. The Cavendish was one of MacKenzie's last UK course designs. He went on to design courses in Australasia, South America and the USA, including the world-famous Augusta National golf course, which opened in 1932 and hosts The Masters annual major golf championship. The Cavendish course was bought by the members from the 11th Duke of Devonshire in 1955. Although the course is under 6,000 yards long, the design of the sloping greens is acknowledged as its main challenge. The course record of 61 is 7 under par.

In the 1990s, many native deciduous trees were planted around the course, funded by grants from the Forestry Commission.

Buxton and High Peak Golf Club was the first golf course in Buxton, founded in 1886 on Fairfield Common. In 1899, the Ladies Golf Club's nine hole course was set out on Temple Meads (which was developed as a housing estate in the 1960s). After the First World War, Canadian troops based in Buxton created a toboggan run across what would later be the first three fairways of the Cavendish course. The toboggan run is still marked on the OS Explorer Map OL24. The Peak District Boundary Walk runs across the golf course.
