= Operation Outward =

WWII British balloon attack on Germany

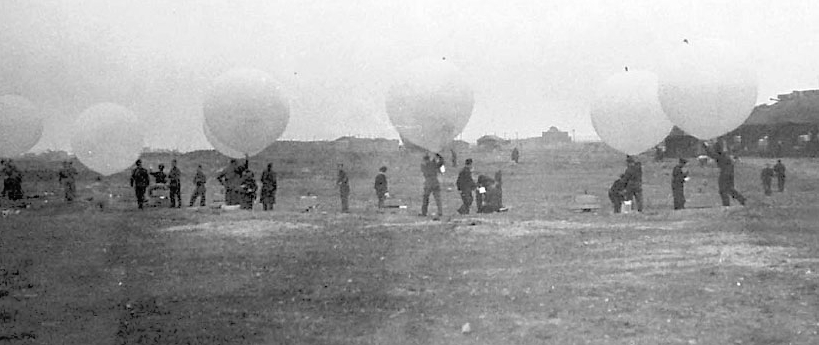
Women's Royal Naval Service personnel launch Outward balloons at Felixstowe (1942–1944)

Operation Outward was a British campaign of the Second World War that attacked Germany and German-occupied Europe with free-flying balloons. It made use of cheap, simple balloons filled with hydrogen and carrying either a trailing steel wire to damage high-voltage power lines by producing a short circuit, or incendiary devices to start fires in fields, forests and heathland. A total of 99,142 Outward balloons were launched; about half carried incendiaries and half carried trailing wires. (Note: Sources agree on the total number but vary as to the exact proportions of wire and incendiary payloads, Peebles gives a little more than half to incendiaries, National Archive records vary slightly but give a little more than half to trailing wires.)

Compared to Japan's better-known fire balloons, Outward balloons were crude. They had to travel a much shorter distance so they flew at a lower altitude – 16,000 ft (4,900 m), compared with 38,000 ft (12,000 m) – and had only a simple mechanism to regulate altitude by means of dropping ballast or venting lifting gas. This meant the balloons were simple to mass-produce and only cost £1 15/- each (approximately equivalent to £85 in 2025). The free flying balloon attacks were highly successful. Although difficult to assess exactly, their economic impact on Germany was far in excess of the cost to the British government.

== History and development ==
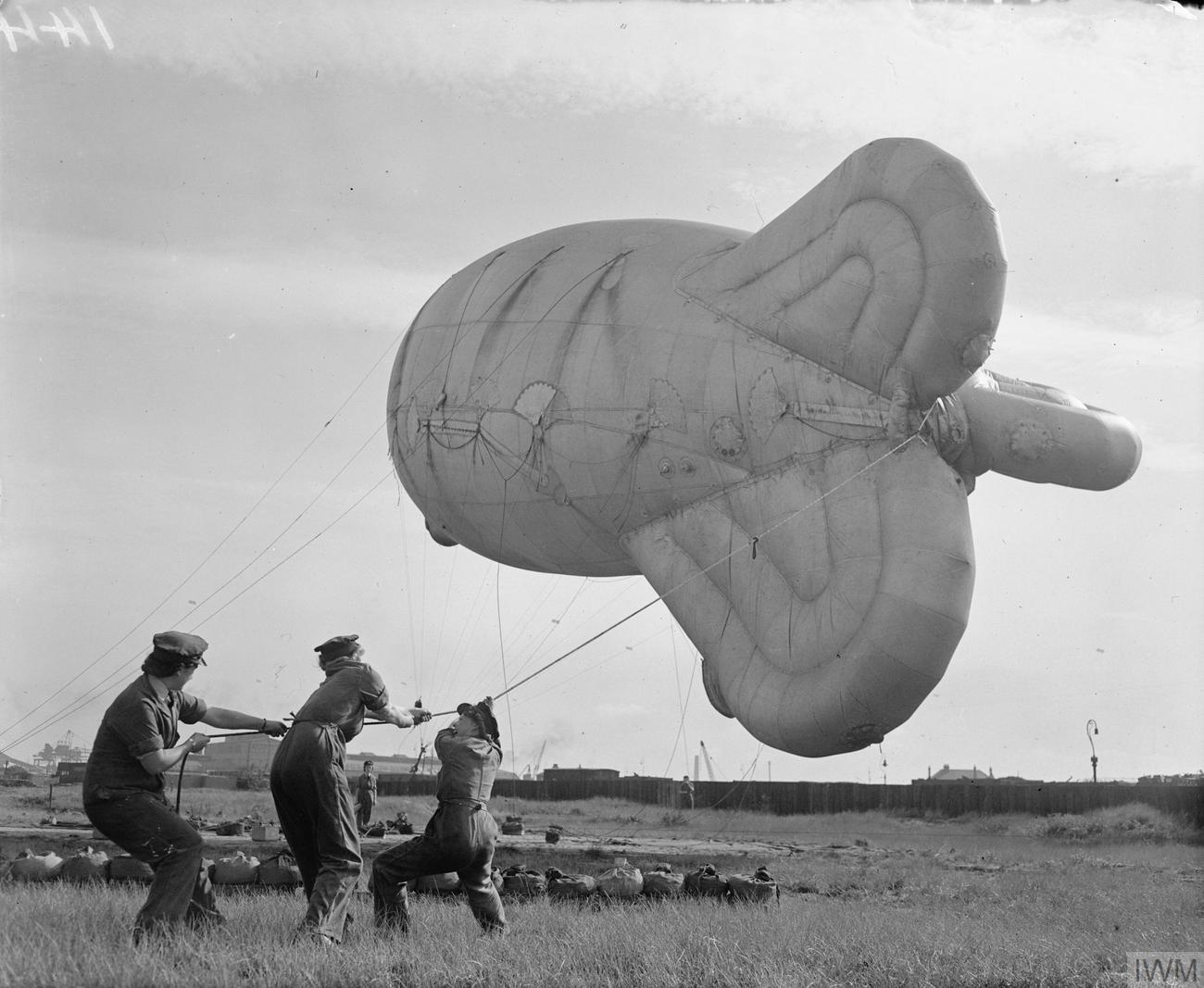
British military auxiliaries handle a barrage balloon.

Because there was concern over what could happen if a barrage balloon accidentally got loose, in 1937 the British carried out a study on the damage that may be caused by a balloon-carried wire hitting power lines. These concerns were evidently borne out when early in 1940, the Air Vice Marshal Balloon Command, the organisation responsible for the barrage balloons, wrote that "Since the outbreak of the war, I have had constant complaints from the electricity distributors regarding the damage done in this country by [barrage] balloons that have broken away from their moorings". to which he added "...advantage might be taken of this to impede and inconvenience the enemy".

It was proposed that bomb-laden balloons could be launched from France. Their position would be tracked by radio triangulation and the bombs would be released by radio control when the balloon drifted over a worthwhile target. This plan was never put into action; objections included that "attacks of this nature should not be originated from a cricketing country" and a concern that the enemy might retaliate with similar weapons. The idea became redundant when defeat in the Battle of France put possible launch sites out of British control.

We may make a virtue of our misfortune.

— Winston Churchill to General Hastings Ismay - September 1940

On the night of 17/18 September 1940, a gale broke loose a number of British barrage balloons and carried them across the North Sea. In Sweden and Denmark, they damaged power lines, disrupted railways and knocked down the antenna for the Swedish International radio station. Five balloons were reported to have reached Finland. A report on the damage and confusion reached the British War Cabinet on 23 September 1940. Winston Churchill then directed that the use of free-flying balloons as weapons against Germany should be investigated. The Air Ministry initially produced a negative report, possibly because the Ministry of Aircraft Production felt balloons would be ineffective weapons and would consume too many resources.

TO SUM UP - If D.B.D. [Director of Boom Defences] is given a free hand, he is prepared to guarantee that he could produce an incendiary balloon attack organisation for operating from an East Coast area (say Harwich) which could be built up using women operatives, coal gas /and/or hydrogen and to produce the incendiaries, balloons and equipment etc. without recognisable interference to any other service activity, but from the experience obtained in attempting to operate F.B.B. in collaboration with the Air Ministry, it is clear that it should be a Naval and not a combined Naval and Air-Force undertaking.

— Vice Chief of Naval Staff - June 1941

The Admiralty took up the idea with more enthusiasm. In particular, Captain Gerald Banister, Director of Boom Defence and a proponent of using balloons as a weapon of offence, pressed the point. The meteorological considerations – including the possibility that the weather might favour the enemy retaliating in kind – were carefully investigated and found to be highly favourable; winds above 16,000 feet (4,900 m) tend to blow from west to east, making it difficult for the Germans to retaliate with similar balloons.

Of particular interest was the possibility of damaging Germany's electricity distribution network by shorting high-voltage overhead power lines with thin wires dragged by balloons. The results of investigations were favourable: trials showed that even a thin steel wire, much thinner than that used to tether the static barrage balloons, when drawn in sliding contact across two or more phases, could cause an arc as long as 15 ft (4.6 m) and that arc would be maintained until the circuit breaker opened. In some cases, the arc's heat could melt the aluminium outer layers and then the reinforcing steel centre strands of the conductors. Even if the cable was not severed, the conductors would be weakened so that they would be susceptible to breaking due to increased electrical demand or normal weather events such as wind, snow and ice.

Investigations revealed that it was common in pre-war Germany to use a Petersen coil as protection against earthing; this design was effective against a short between a high-voltage cable and earth but relatively vulnerable to a short between different phases. A short between phases could result in damage, not just to a cable but to transformers and the circuit breakers. The Admiralty ran trials using surplus spherical latex meteorological balloons about 8 ft (2.4 m) in diameter when inflated. Calculations based on the trials predicted that there would be between a 10% to 75% chance of a balloon's wire coming into contact with a high-voltage overhead line during a 30 mi (48 km) flight along the ground.

Balloons could also carry incendiaries. Large areas of pine forest and heathland in Germany made the countryside vulnerable to random incendiary attack and it was hoped that the Germans would be forced to assign large numbers of people to the task of fire watching, possibly diverting them from more productive war-work. The Admiralty concluded that the balloons could be produced at very little cost; many of the important parts already existed as surplus materials and despite the needs of conventional barrage balloons, there was plenty of hydrogen gas with which to fill the balloons. The balloons could be used with a small number of British personnel who would face minimal risks.

== Design ==
The balloons used were surplus weather balloons of which the Navy had a stock of 100,000 all carefully stored in French chalk. Using this surplus was important to the practicality of Operation Outward because white latex rubber from which they were made was an important war material that was in short supply. The balloons were about 8 ft (2.4 m) in diameter when inflated. (Note: An eight foot diameter hydrogen filled balloon might be expected to lift 18.66 lb (8.46 kg).) They carried a simple timing and regulating mechanism that was based upon a design developed for Operation Albino – a plan to use somewhat larger latex balloons as anti-aircraft weapons. (Note: Operation Albino was a plan to use many free balloons to form an aerial minefield. Each Albino balloon would carry a long wire with a parachute at the bottom and a small yellow bomb at the top. If an aircraft caught the wire, the drag of the parachute would cause the bomb to be drawn down onto the aircraft where it would explode on contact. Albino was tried but was not particularly successful.)

At launch, a slow-burning fuse was lit; its length was calibrated to the estimated time to arrive over German-controlled territory. At first, the balloon rose rapidly and expanded in size until an internal cord tightened, preventing further increase in altitude beyond 25,000 ft (7,600 m) by releasing some gas; the balloon would then begin a slow descent due to the hydrogen gradually leaking away. After a while, the slow burning fuse would release a bung in a can of mineral oil; as the oil slowly dripped out, the balloon's payload would lighten, arresting its descent. The same slow-burning fuse was also used to release the balloon's weapon. There were a number of payload designs designated: wire, beer, jelly, socks, lemon, and jam.

=== Wire ===
About half of the Outward balloons carried the wire payload. In the case of the wire, the slow burning fuse would burn through the cord that held the trailing wire. The trailing wire consisted of about 700 ft (210 m) of 1/16 in (1.6 mm) diameter hemp cord with a breaking strength of 40 lb (18 kg). The hemp cord was attached to 300 ft (91 m) of 0.072 in (1.8 mm) diameter (15 gauge) steel wire. Tests had revealed that the main reason for the trailing wire getting caught up in ground obstacles was "springiness" at the end of the wires; this was addressed by obtaining special straightened wire.

At the same time as the trailing wire was deployed, a stopper on the canister of mineral oil was released so that it would assist in maintaining altitude by slowly dripping out and lightening the load on the balloon. It was calculated that the balloon should have a slightly negative lift of about 1 lb (0.45 kg) so that the balloon would descend until a short length of the wire had its weight taken by the ground. The long length of hemp cord allowed the balloon to maintain an altitude of about 1,000 ft (300 m) which would reduce the chance of the balloon being becalmed in still air.

The plan was that the wire tail would be dragged for about 30 mi (48 km) across the land and eventually encounter a high-voltage transmission line. A phase-to-phase short circuit would be initiated; during trials, arcs 15 ft (4.6 m) long were initiated by the wire. The arc would burn for some time before the transmission line protection operated; there was a good chance the circuit breaker would be damaged and the conductors might burn through due to arcing. This could cause a line to collapse and require repairs. German efforts to protect transmission lines from attack were unsuccessful: neither a new type of line conductor clamp nor different over-current protection settings had any useful effect.

=== Beer, jelly and socks ===
Incendiary weapons

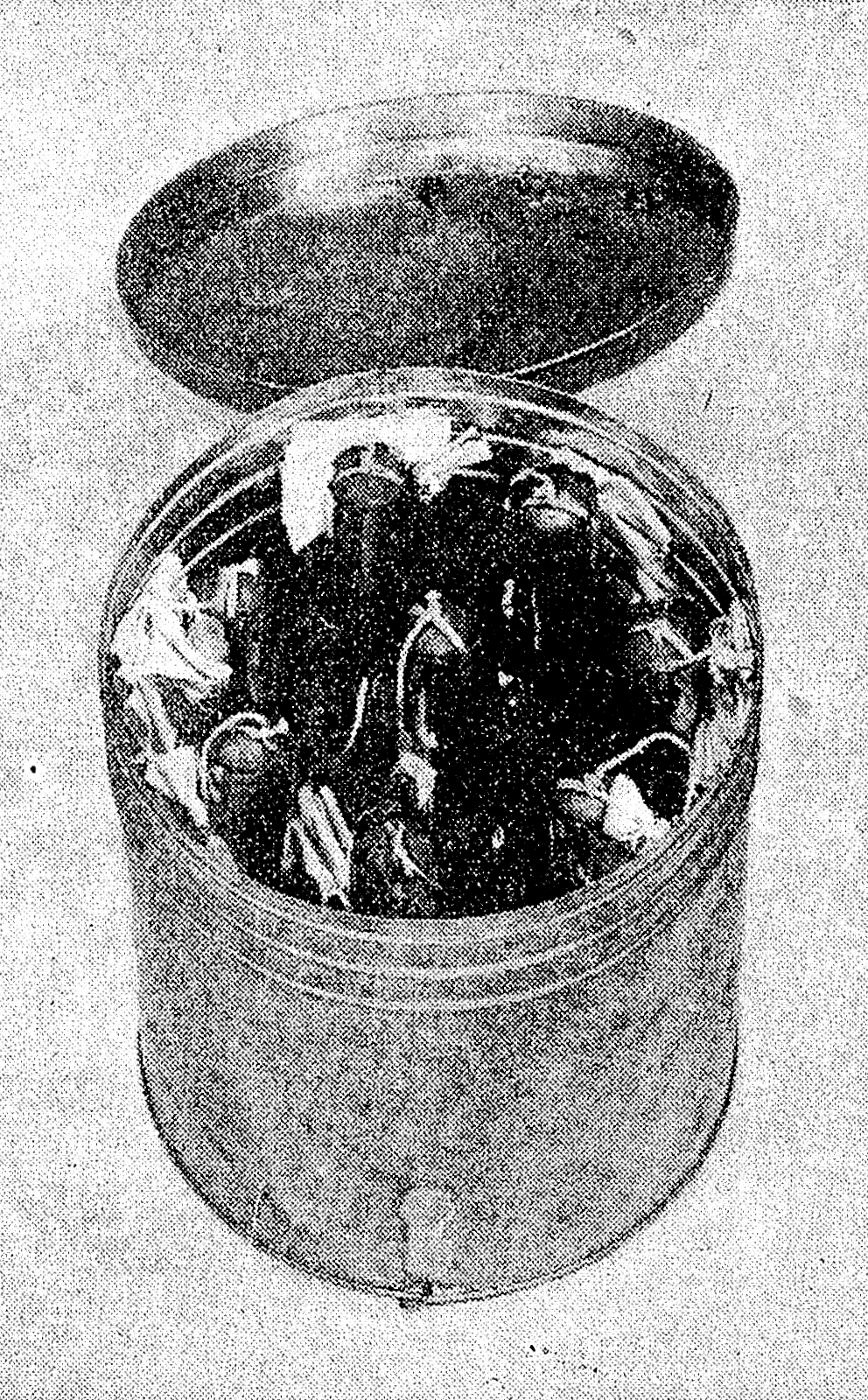
Phosphorus bottles in container

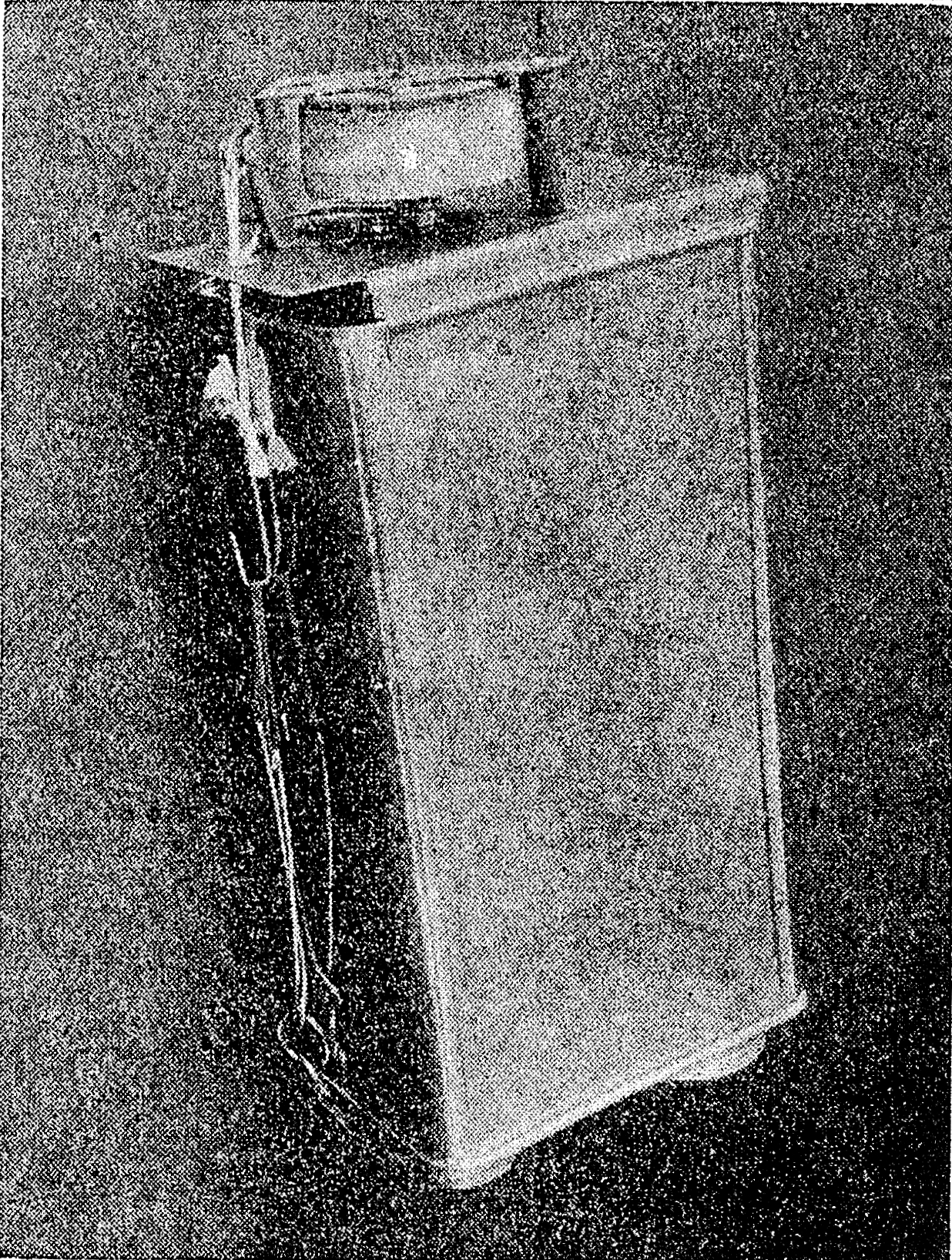
Can of incendiary jelly

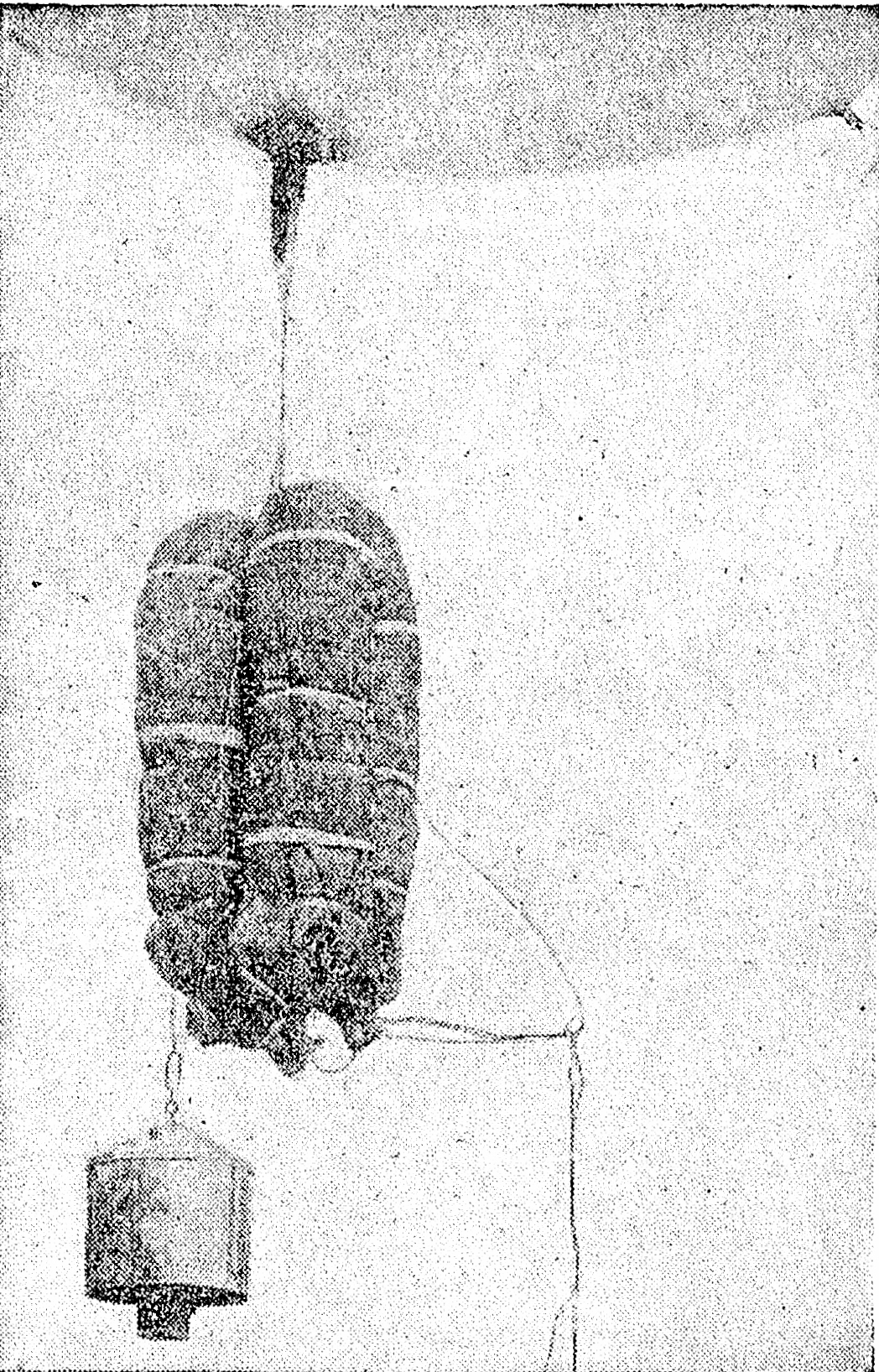
Incendiary sock unit

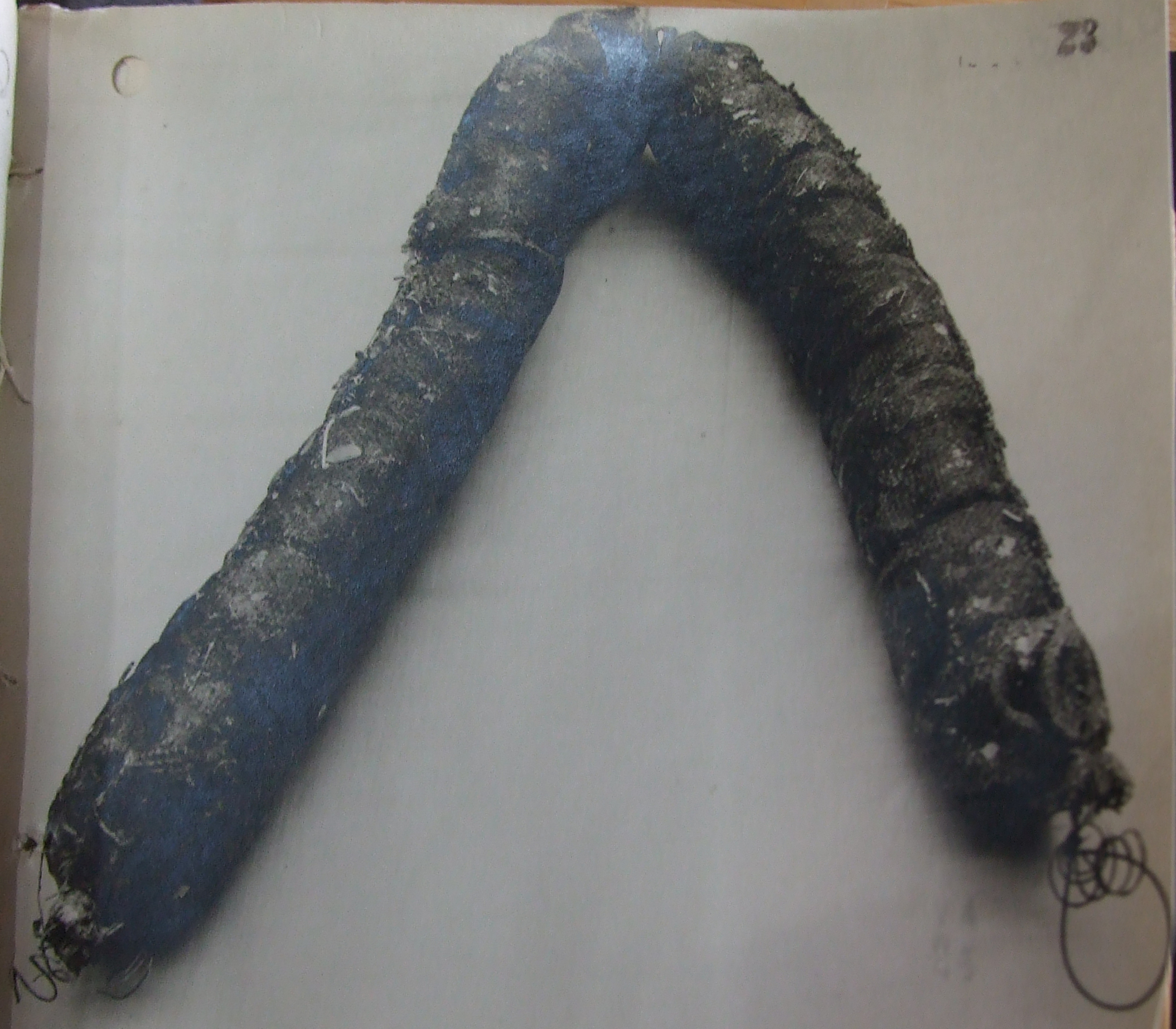
Incendiary sock

Beer, jelly and socks were incendiary devices.

Beer consisted of a cylindrical metal container 8 1/2 in (22 cm) in diameter and 9 in (23 cm) long containing seven or eight half-pint bottles. Each bottle was a Self-igniting phosphorus (SIP) grenade – it contained white phosphorus, benzene, water and a strip of raw rubber, two in (5.1 cm) long, which dissolved and formed a layer. After a delay caused by a slow burning fuse, the metal container was tipped open and its contents allowed to fall out. Around the neck of each bottle was a small metal sleeve that held a heavy ball about 1 inch (25mm) in diameter. The ball was attached to a strip of canvas; this ensured that when the bottles dropped they fell the right way round. The SIP grenades would spontaneously ignite on shattering.

Jelly were cans of incendiary jelly. Each cuboid can measured about 11 1/2 in × 6 1/2 in × 4 in (29 cm × 17 cm × 10 cm) and contained one imp gal (4.5 L) of jelly. A release mechanism and a fuse were provided; on ignition a fireball erupted with a radius of about 20 ft (6.1 m).

Socks were long thin canvas bags of incendiary material each weighing about 6 lb (2.7 kg). Socks were packed with wood wool, bound with wire and soaked in boiling paraffin wax. Each Outward balloon could carry three socks. The bundle measured about 27 in × 10 in × 10 in (690 mm × 250 mm × 250 mm). When dropped, socks formed a V‑shaped sausage designed to catch in the crown of a tree. Fuses were inserted in each end of the device and it would burn from each end for 15 minutes. In 1941 the Royal Navy had a stock of 10,000 such socks already fused and ready to be used and another 20,000 bodies that could be brought forward as required. (Note: If one Outward balloon carried three socks then the 9,644 sock payloads mentioned in the records would have almost exactly used this supply.)

=== Lemon and jam ===
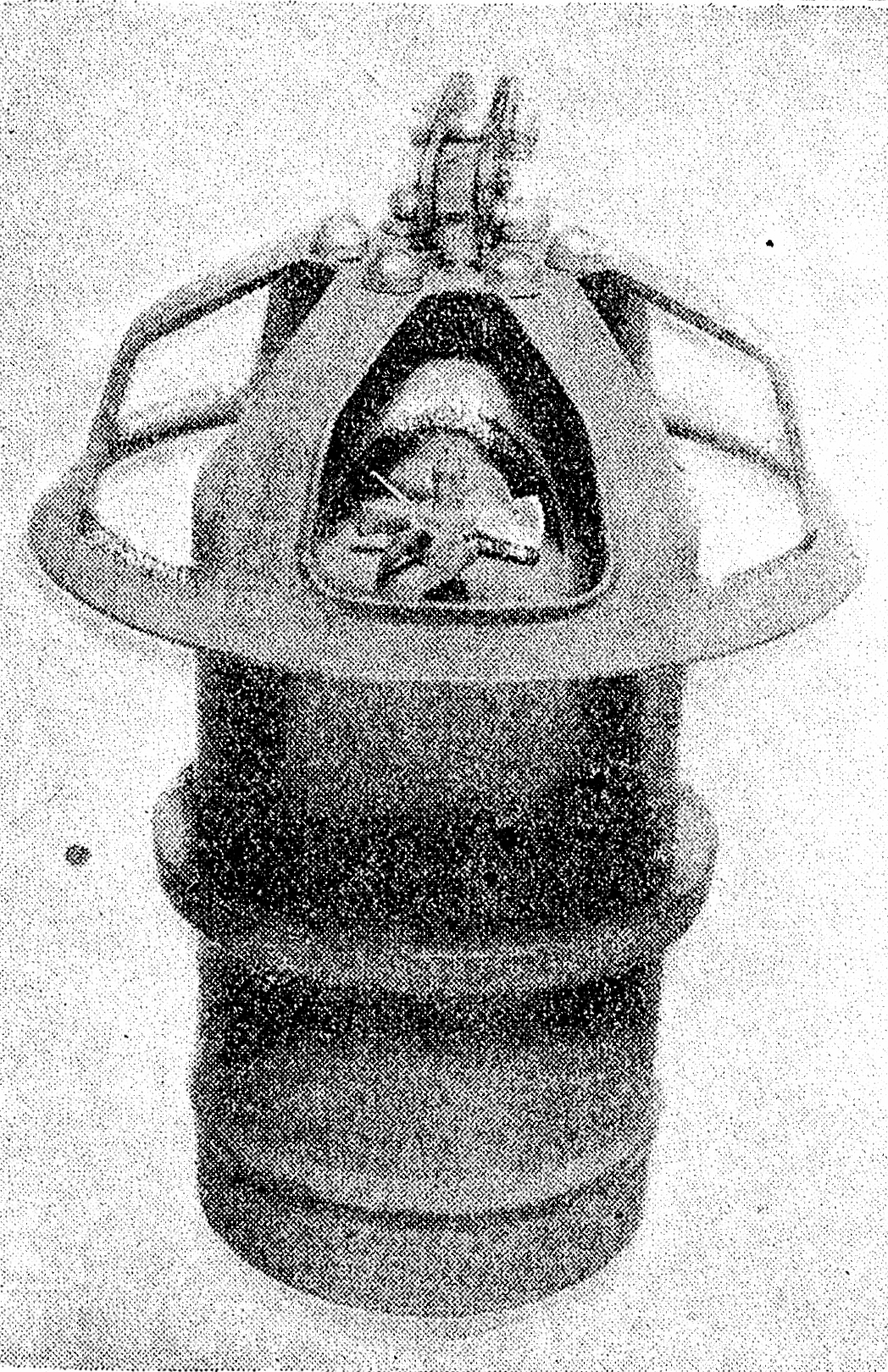
Small yellow bomb

All the payloads that are clearly code named and described are either a trailing wire or an incendiary. Small yellow bombs left over from Operation Albino were also used and it seems likely that these are identified by one of these code words. It is possible that the other was used to drop leaflets – there are occasional, vague mentions of leaflet drops in the records.

== Deployment ==
After a lengthy bureaucratic struggle between the opponents in the Air Ministry and proponents in the Admiralty, the British Chiefs of Staff gave the go‑ahead in September 1941 and a launch site was set up, based at HMS Beehive, a Royal Navy shore establishment near Felixstowe in Suffolk. The actual balloon releases took place at the Felixstowe Ferry Golf Club. The first launches took place on 20 March 1942. Within days, the British were receiving reports of forest fires near Berlin and Tilsit in East Prussia.

The personnel that launched the balloons were six Royal Navy and Royal Marine officers, 80 Royal Marines, 7 Women's Royal Naval Service (WRNS) officers and 140 non-commissioned WRNS. The operation also required the assistance of the RAF Balloon Command (that supplied and delivered the hydrogen) and the Naval Meteorological Services. The balloons were inflated using hydrogen from pressure cylinders that were brought to the launch site by truck. They were inflated inside three-sided tents or windbreaks. During inflation, it was necessary to keep the latex wet with a water spray – otherwise, friction between the balloon and the tent canvas might have caused the hydrogen to ignite. The inflated balloons were conveyed by hand to a dispersal point, where their payload was attached.

Balloon operations could be hazardous, and there were many instances of launch crew requiring hospital treatment for burns caused by exploding balloons or by mishandling incendiary payloads. The WRNS were equipped with "flash-proof jacket & hood (½ mica & ½ fine copper gauze over the face) + protective cream on hands and fire-proof black gloves". (Note: WRNS Cecilia Banister quoted by Finley.)

For security reasons, the Felixstowe launch crews were referred to as a "Boom-defence" unit, a cover story that was partly true as they were put to work maintaining anti-submarine nets when weather conditions were not right for balloon launches. The Felixstowe golf club site had a number of Lewis Guns for anti-aircraft defence, which the WRNS women were trained to operate, occasionally releasing balloons for the purpose of target practice.

Operation Outward balloon payloads (Note: The figures in the table come directly from a document in the National Archive. The totals do not add up correctly so there must be some errors in the record.)
Period	Wire	Beer	Jelly	Socks	Lemon	Jam	Total
"ordinary" (20 March 1942 to 7 February 1944)	54,369	24,075	5,900	9,291	-	-	96,625
"trickle" (29 April 1944 to 4 September 1944)	230	2,808	1,596	253	899	739	6,517
Total	54,599	26,883	7,496	9,644	899	739	99,142

== Effects ==
The British were keen to assess the effectiveness of Operation Outward. Intercepts of Luftwaffe communications soon showed German fighters were trying to shoot down balloons. This encouraged the British as it was felt that the harassment value on German air defences alone justified Operation Outward – it cost the Germans more, in fuel and wear and tear on aircraft, to destroy each balloon than it cost the British to make them. Later, reports were received revealing damage to electricity supplies and fires in forests and on farms. Most of these reports were gleaned from newspaper reports in Denmark, France and other occupied countries where the German authorities tried to paint the British attacks in an unfavourable light.

After the war, German records revealed that the trailing wire attacks had caused the Germans considerable inconvenience with electricity supplies frequently being interrupted and significant damage to the electrical distribution network. A 1946 report concluded that, based on available records, £1,500,000 of damage was done (approximately equivalent to £47 million in 2025). The report also stated that the actual amount of damage must have been far higher because the records were incomplete with no available records for the Russian zone and all records becoming less reliable after 1943. The Germans had attempted to record interrupts to the lower voltage lines but the incidents were so frequent that the recording was abandoned. In addition to sending up fighters, the Germans used anti-aircraft fire against the balloons, sometimes shut down electric cables when an attack was anticipated, and modified the circuit breakers on high-voltage networks.

In July 1942, a second launch site was set up at Oldstairs Bay near Dover. On 12 July 1942, a wire-carrying balloon struck a 110 kV power line near Leipzig. A failure in the circuit breaker at the Böhlen power station caused a fire that destroyed the station; this was Outward's greatest success.

The effects of the incendiary attacks were very difficult to assess – it could be difficult to tell whether any particular fire was caused by Outward or by an accident, sabotage, or aircraft-dropped incendiary. Intelligence sources, including reports from newspapers printed in occupied Europe, indicated that some fires had definitely been caused by Outward. Outward caused damage in neutral countries – on the night of 19/20 January 1944, two trains collided at Laholm in Sweden after an Outward balloon knocked out electrical lighting on the railway. Changing winds could also blow balloons back to the United Kingdom. On one occasion, a balloon knocked out the electricity supply to the town of Ipswich. In addition, failures in the altitude adjustment mechanism caused such balloons to fall in Belgium in an area ranging from Tournai to Andenne.

== End of the operation ==
In August 1942, launches reached 1,000 per day and later increased to attacks involving up to 1,800 balloons all launched over a period of three to four hours. Balloon launches continued, though they were frequently suspended when there were large air raids on Germany as it was feared the balloons might damage Allied bombers. From May 1944 it was decided to change tactics because of increased Allied aircraft activity. The mass balloon launches were stopped and replaced with a "trickle" of balloons launched from three sites at ten-minute intervals throughout daylight hours.

Only 2% of the balloons were to be of the trailing wire type. The "trickle system" was not thought to be a significant threat to Allied aircraft so it could go on uninterrupted. The trickle system simplified the hydrogen supply requirements of the launch sites and released transport vehicles and compressed gas cylinders needed for operations against German V-1 flying bombs and for the Normandy landings. The last balloons were launched on 4 September 1944.

== See also ==
- Fu-Go balloon bomb
- Fire balloon
- Graphite bomb
- Project Moby Dick
- WS-124A Flying Cloud
