= Blackwell, County Durham =

Suburb of Darlington, England

Coordinates: 54.51281°N 1.57074°W

Blackwell
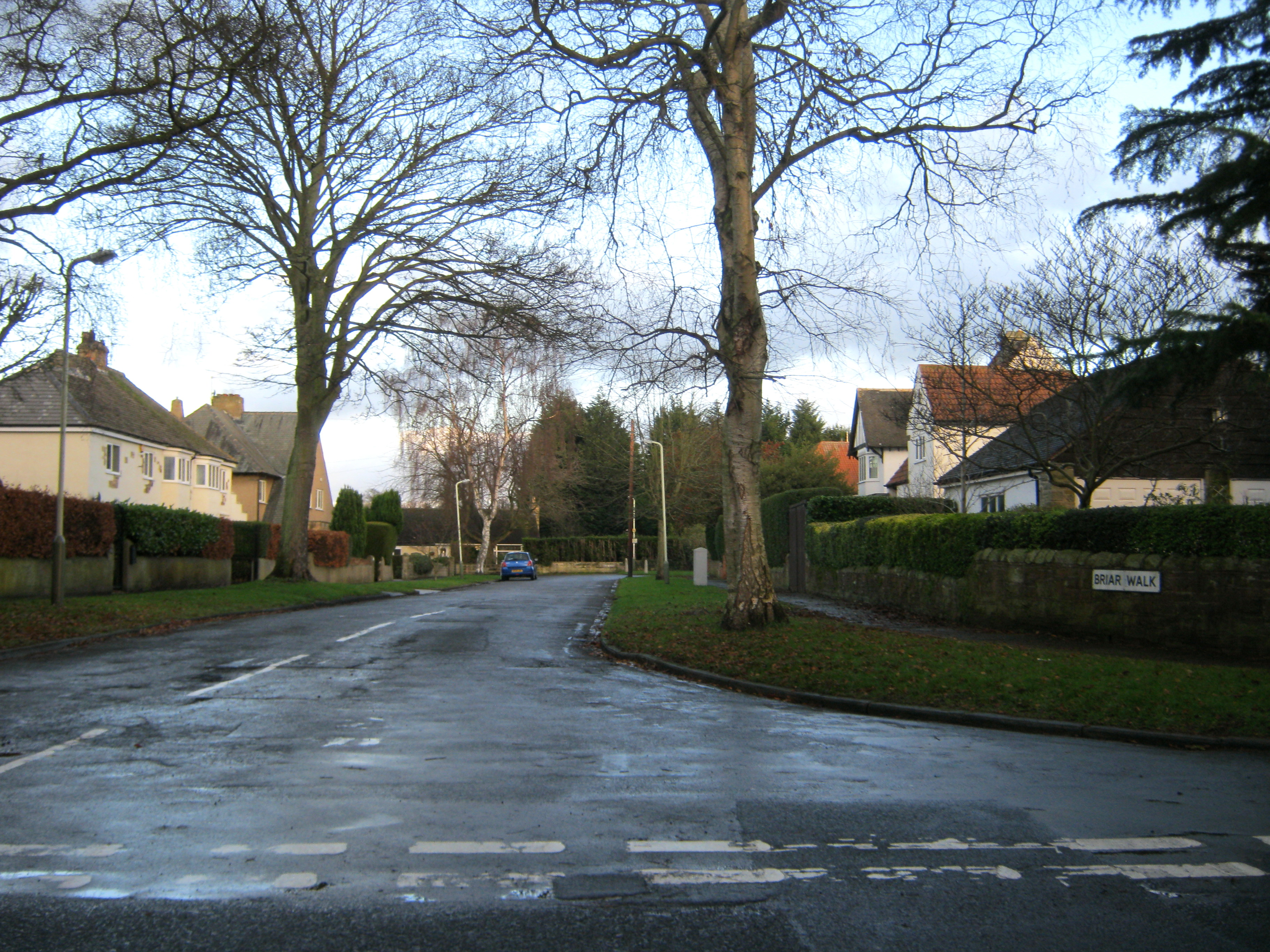

- Location within County Durham
- OS grid reference: NZ278131
- Unitary authority: Darlington
- Ceremonial county: Durham
- Region: North East
- Country: England
- Sovereign state: United Kingdom
- Post town: DARLINGTON
- Postcode district: DL3
- Dialling code: 01325
- Police: Durham
- Fire: County Durham and Darlington
- Ambulance: North East
- UK Parliament: Darlington

Blackwell is a suburb in the borough of Darlington and the ceremonial county of Durham, England. It is situated towards the edge of the West End of Darlington, beside the River Tees. Blackwell consists of large 1930s style semi-detached and detached houses, and private, newly built homes. Blackwell Grange is an 18th-century country house converted into a hotel.

Its sports facilities include Blackwell Grange Golf Club, and Blackwell Meadows, home of Darlington RFC and Darlington AFC.

== Governance ==
Blackwell was formerly a township in the parish of Darlington, in 1866 Blackwell became a separate civil parish, on 1 April 1967 the parish was abolished and merged with Hurworth and Cleasby. In 1961 the parish had a population of 466. It is now in the unparished area of Darlington.

== Notable people ==
- Philippa Langley MBE, Discovered the remains of Richard III in a car park in Leicester in 2012
