= Brent Valley Golf Club =

West London golf club

Coordinates: 51.51597°N 0.34020°W

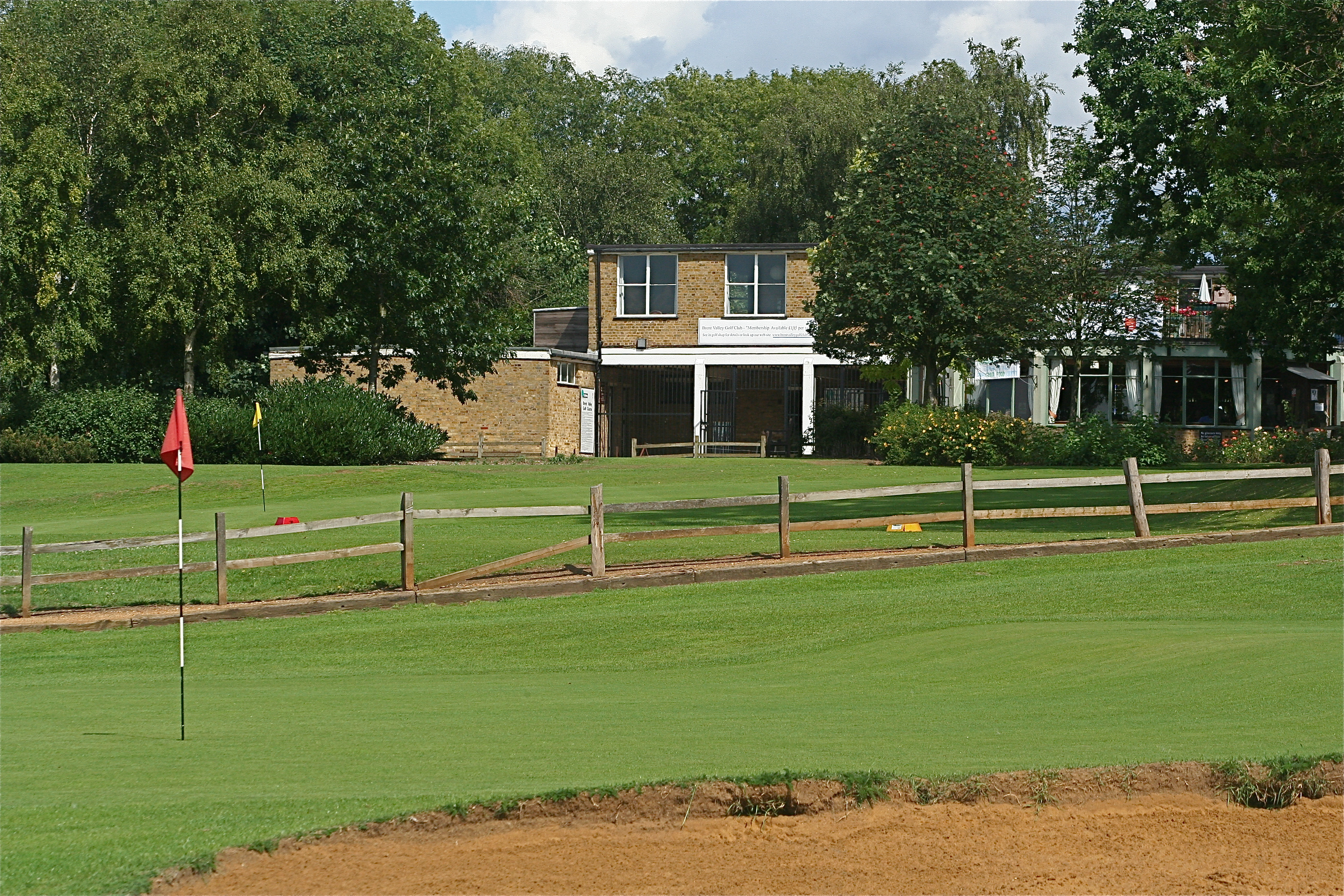
Brent Valley Golf Club clubhouse, 2009

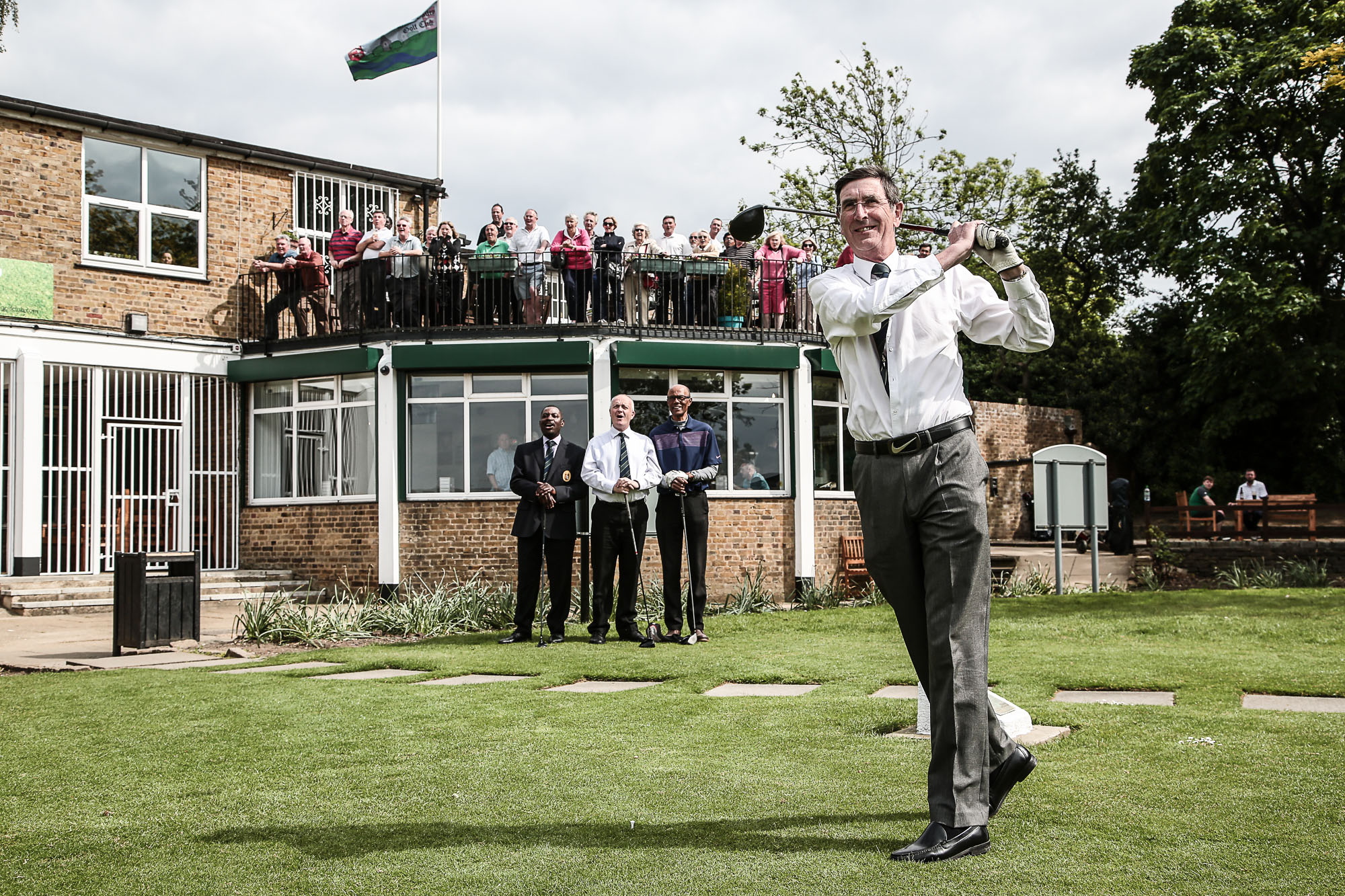
The Captain's Drive-In in 2015

Brent Valley Golf Club is a golf club located in Hanwell, West London. The club is an affiliated member of the English Golf Union and Middlesex Golf is based on the Brent Valley Golf course, which is owned by Ealing Council. The club also belongs to the National Association of Public Golf Clubs and Courses. In 2022 it was named Middlesex Golf Club of the Year.

The club is located within the large Brent Valley Golf Course, adjacent to further green open spaces Brent Valley Park, Brent Lodge Park, and West Middlesex Golf Course in Dormers Wells. The golf course inspired the name of the two adjacent residential tower blocks, Gleneagles Tower and St Andrews Tower.

== History ==
The club was founded in 1909 by Albert Toley (1855–1924). It was previously called Springfield Park Golf Club, but its name was changed when the course was expanded from 9 to 18 holes. In the 1800s the land on which Brent Valley was later to stand was owned by the Rector G.H. Glasse. The course was designed by JH Taylor in the early 1900s. At the first annual club dinner held on 5 April 1910 at the Trocodero, Hanwell membership was reported to be over 300. In 1933, the club won the Middlesex CGU Coronation Bowl in the second year it was played. In 1938, Ealing Council acquired the course to preserve it from being developed and a lease with Brent Valley Golf Club was signed. The new public course was opened on 20 July 1938 by the Mayor of Ealing. In 1966 the old clubhouse, the "Dublin House" was demolished by the council and the present one built and the course was remodeled to the present format. It was believed that the remodelling was carried out by Peter Alliss but he has stated that this was not the case. In 2009 the club celebrated its centenary, which was marked by a ceremonial tee-off by the then Mayor of Ealing, Barbara Yerolemou . The course is now run by a private contractor Everyone Active as of 1 October 2014, through a contract with Ealing Council. In 2022 it was named Middlesex Golf Club of the Year.

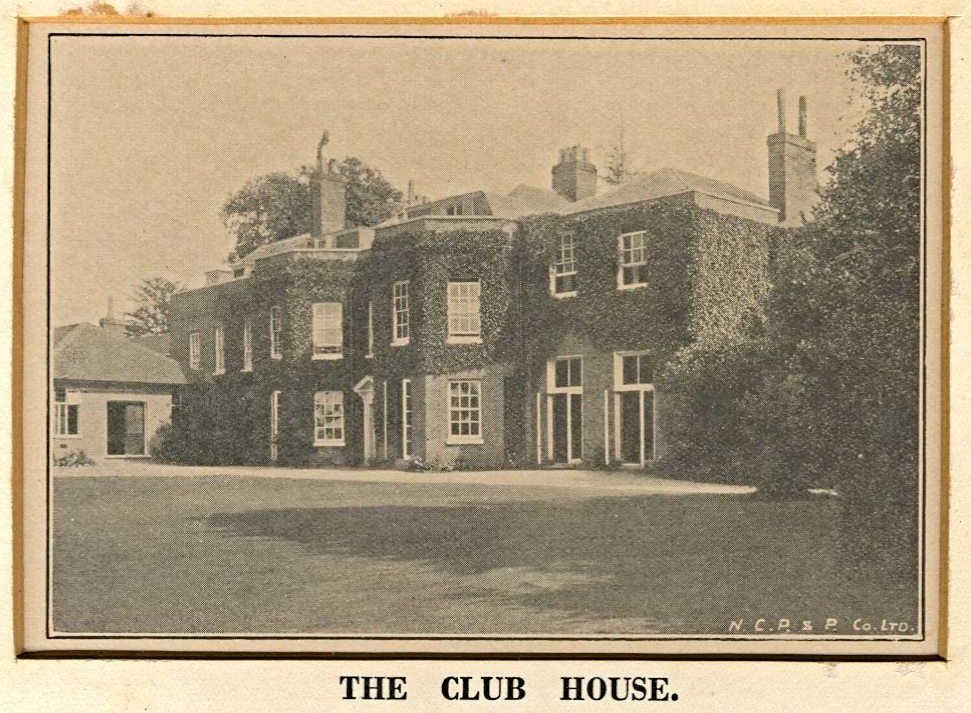
The Brent Valley clubhouse (Dublin House) c. 1910

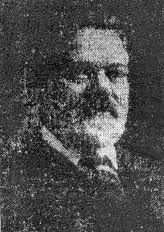
Albert Toley

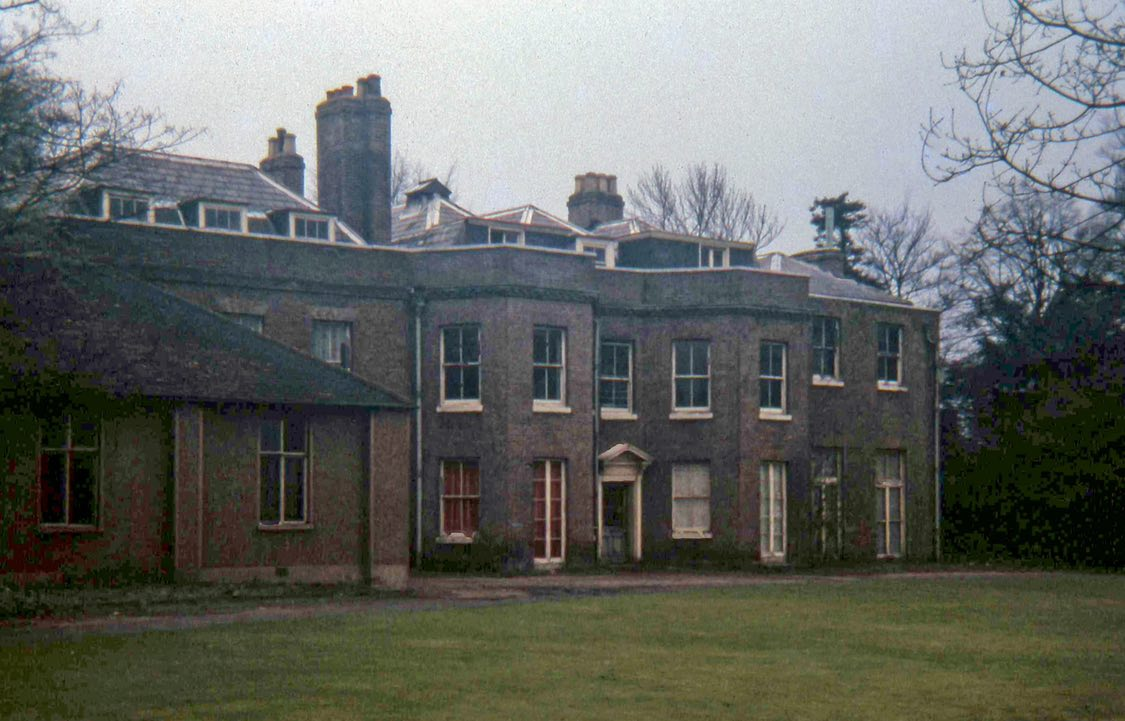
The old clubhouse at Brent Valley Golf Course in 1966

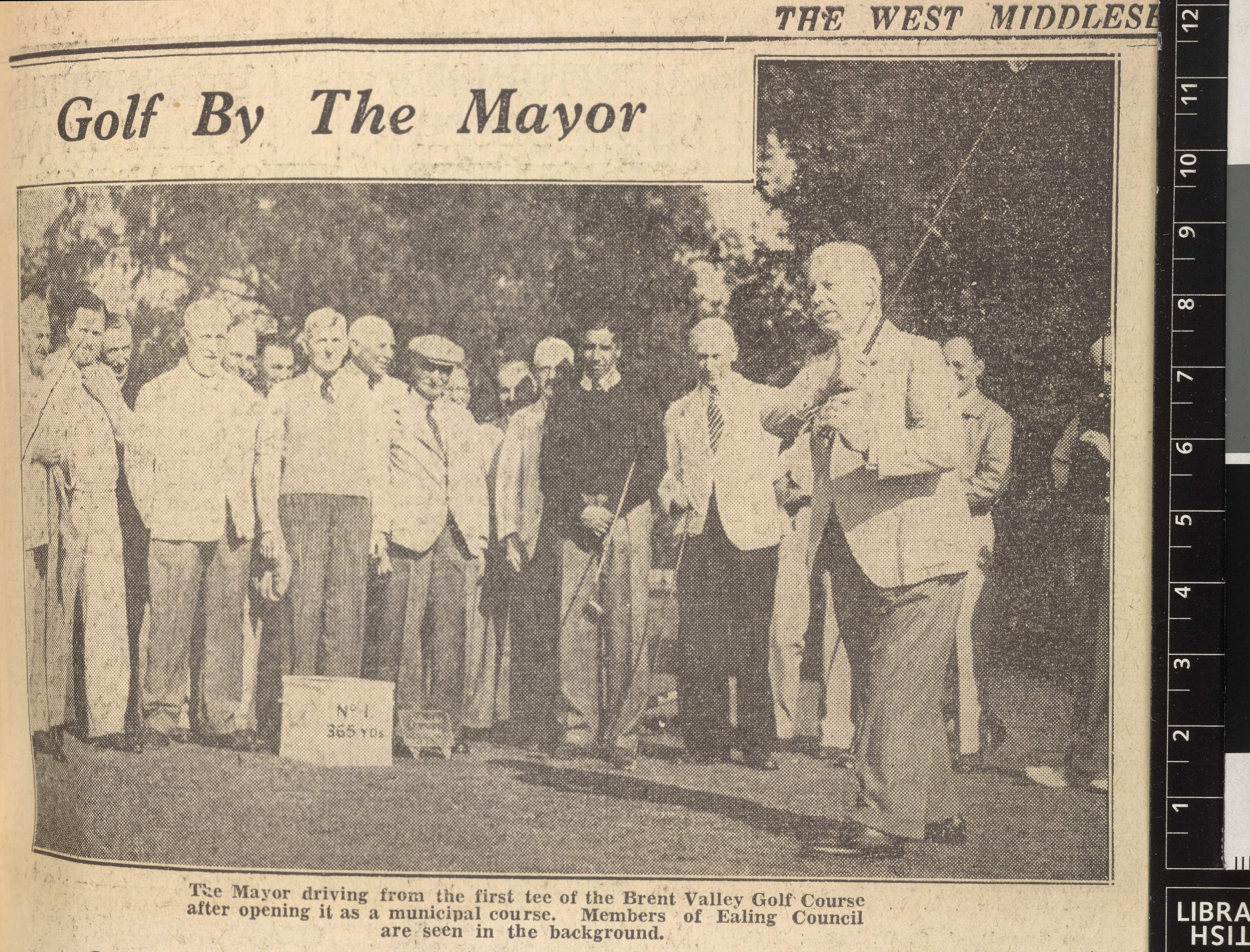
The Mayor of Ealing officially opening the course after its takeover by the Council in 1938.

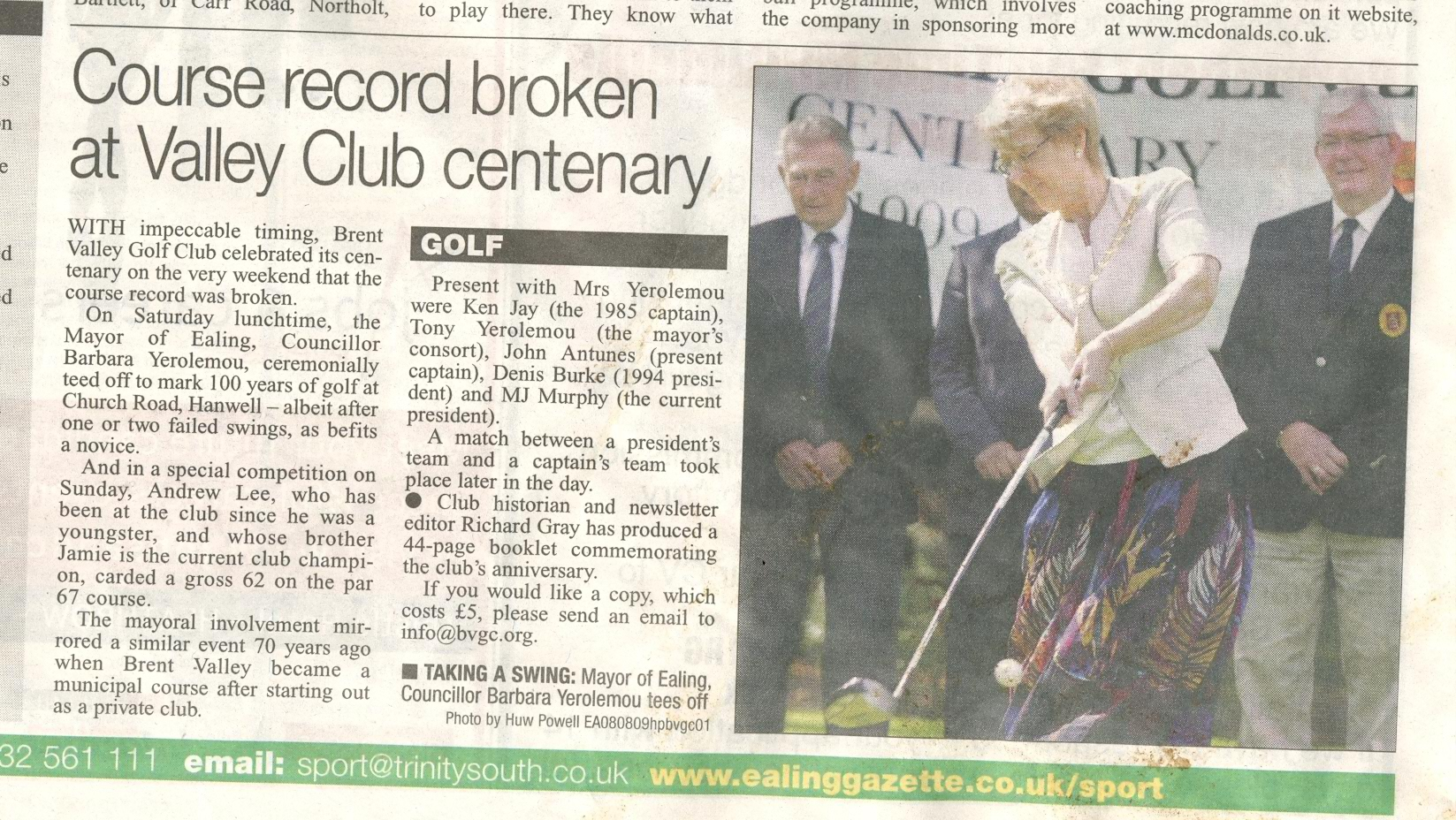
The Ealing Mayor at the 2009 Centenary Celebrations

=== Albert Toley ===
Albert Toley was Brent Valley Golf Club’s founder and first President, in 1909. Born in 1855 in Devon, he lived in The Grove in Hanwell from 1906, which it is believed was later used as Brent Valley’s club house and later renamed Dublin House. Albert was a public benefactor and property developer. But his first post in London was as a teacher at the United Westminster School near Victoria Station aged 17. In 1876 he took over the school’s sports and found that the school lacked playing fields. He had the idea of renting land, in Willesden, for the school’s games and sub-letting some of it to local sports clubs. Sensing demand from other clubs, he repeated the exercise with other land. So successful was the venture that he gave up his teaching job and acquired other sites. At one point he was managing over 1,000 acres (4.0 km^{2}). One of the plots of land he acquired was later to become Brent Valley Golf Course, where he founded the club. Although he managed many other sites and founded other clubs, Brent Valley held a special place in his heart since he lived in The Grove, which was on the course, and he was the Club’s first president. Local newspapers report him playing in matches for Brent Valley, alongside his son Frank, against other local clubs with a handicap of 9 at the age of 64. Albert Toley died on 6 September 1924.

== The Course ==
Brent Valley is a traditional parkland style golf course and while not the longest course in the area at 5446yards is designed to offer a good level of golf for all handicaps. The use of the natural land shape in the design of many of the holes with the addition strategically placed bunkers and hazards to challenge players of all levels.

Hole No.	Yards	Par	Score Index	Hole No.	Yards	Par	Score Index
1	308	4	9	10	350	4	6
2	361	4	5	11	327	4	10
3	359	4	13	12	160	3	14
4	126	3	17	13	207	3	12
5	436	4	3	14	359	4	2
6	439	4	1	15	279	4	18
7	160	3	15	16	175	3	16
8	277	4	11	17	377	4	4
9	381	4	7	18	365	4	8
	2847	34		IN	2599	33	
				OUT	2847	34	
				TOTAL	5446	67	
