= Wick Golf Club =

Golf club in Highland, Scotland

- Interactive map of Wick Golf Club
- 58°28′58.58″N 3°7′40.23″W

Club information
- Location: Reiss, Scotland
- Total holes: 18
- Website: www.wickgolfclub.org.uk
- Par: 69
- Length: 6123 yards

Wick Golf Club was established in 1870, making it the oldest established golf club in the Highlands of Scotland. Located in Caithness, 3 miles north of the town of Wick, it is one of the most northerly courses in mainland UK.

The course is a traditional 18 hole link layout consisting of 9 holes out and 9 back to the clubhouse.
