= Felixstowe Ferry Golf Club =

Golf club in Suffolk, England

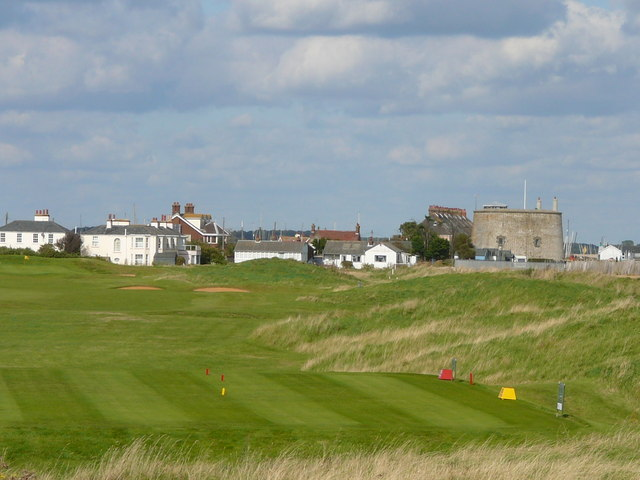
- The golf course and the Martello Tower at Felixstowe Ferry (2008)

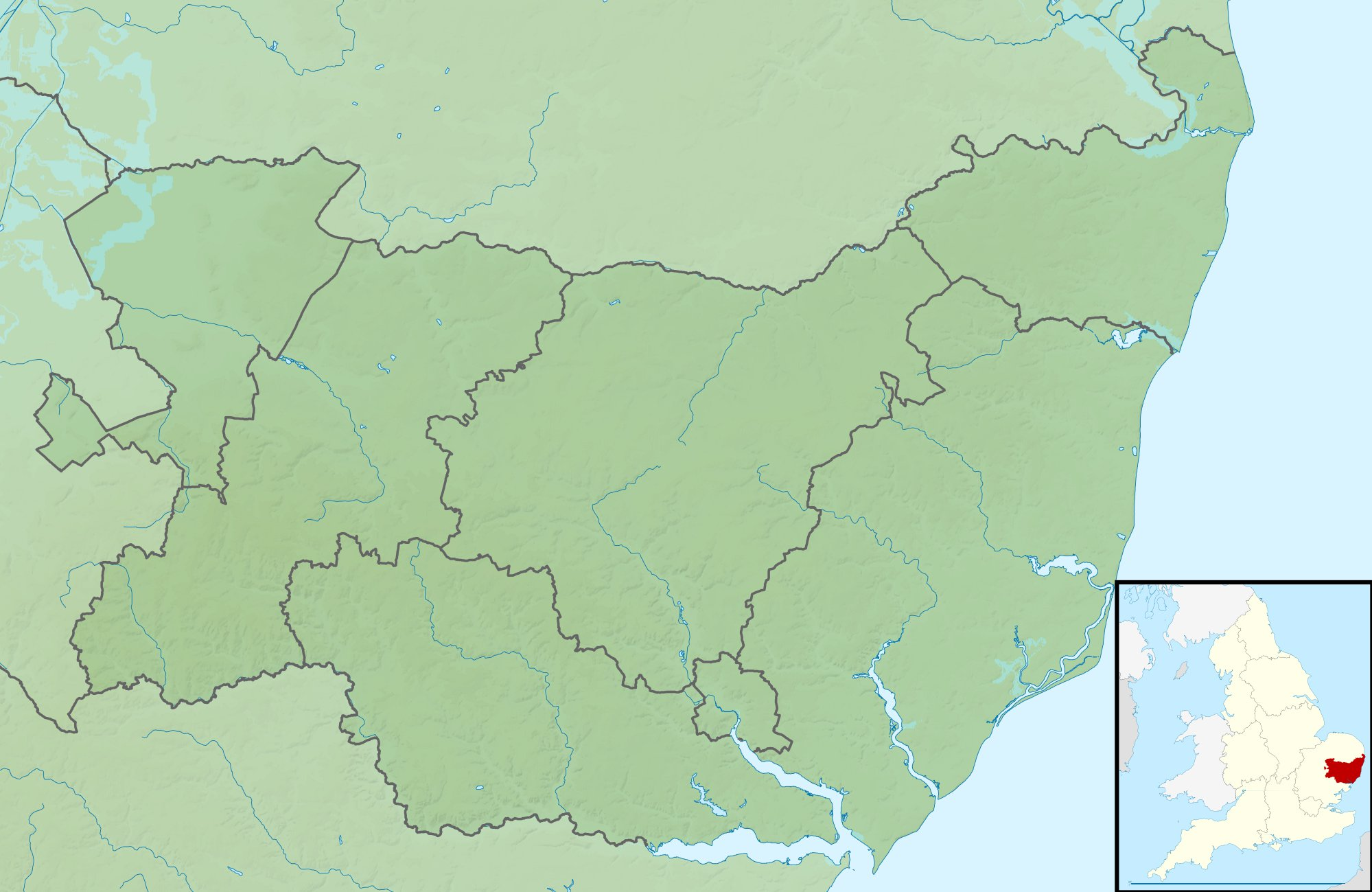
- Location within Suffolk Location within England Location within the United Kingdom
- 51.977°N 1.382°E

Club information
- Location: Felixstowe, Suffolk, England
- Established: 1880
- Tota holes: 27

Martello Course
- Designed by: Henry Cotton
- Par: 72 (18 holes)
- Length: 6,379 yd (5,833 m)

Kingsfleet Course
- Par: 35 (9 holes)
- Length: 2,956 yd (2,703 m)

The Felixstowe Ferry Golf Club is in Felixstowe, Suffolk, England.

== History ==
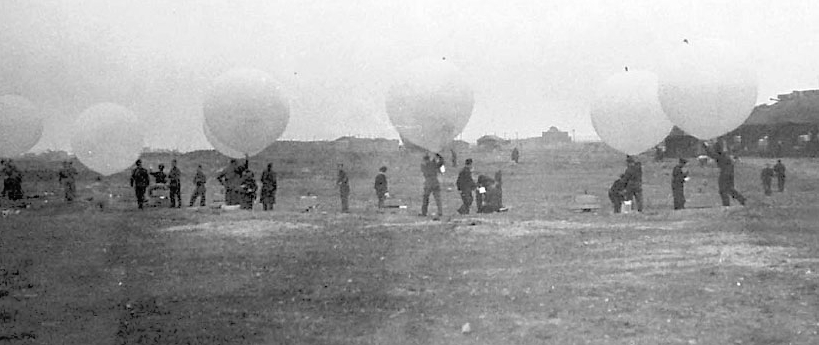
Members of the WRNS launching Operation Outward balloons at Felixstowe (1942-1944)

The club was founded in 1880. Francis Charteris, Lord Elcho, was considered its founder and the first president of the club.

The Rt. Hon. A.J. Balfour (the Prime Minister from 1902 to 1905) was one of the first captains in 1889. He was later captain of The Royal and Ancient Golf Club of St Andrews. The club was also the short-lived home of Willie Fernie (the 1883 Open Champion).

During World War Two, the club was taken over for use by the Royal Navy. Between 1942 and 1944 it was used as a launch site for Operation Outward. This saw the release of tens of thousands of balloons which were carried to Germany by prevailing winds. The balloon payloads were either incendiary devices, or long trailing steel wires intended to cause short circuits in high voltage power lines.

== Current status ==
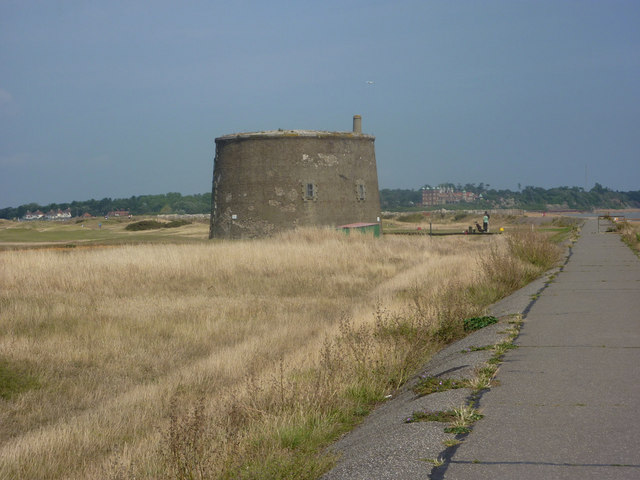
A golfer tees off next to the Martello Tower (2009)

The Martello Course (named after the Martello Tower "T") at Felixstowe Ferry is the fifth oldest course in England, having been established in 1880. Its current design has been attributed to Henry Cotton. The Martello Course has 18 holes, 6379 yards, par 72, right next to the sea with views over the East Anglian coast and Deben Estuary. It is the only links course in Suffolk and one of only 246 true links courses in the world.
