= Maidenhead Golf Club =

Golf club in Berkshire, England

The Maidenhead Golf Club
- Location within Berkshire

Club information
- Location: Ascot, Berkshire, England
- Established: 1896
- Total holes: 18
- Website: www.maidenheadgolfclub.co.uk

The Maidenhead Golf Club is a golf club, located in North Ascot, Berkshire, England. It was established in 1896.

The Maidenhead Golf Club previously occupied a council-owned site in Maidenhead town centre. On 16 July 2016, the club signed an agreement with the Royal Borough of Windsor and Maidenhead, agreeing to sell back its 24-year lease early. The Club then sought to purchase land or an existing club in order to continue its long-standing existence.

In 2025 the club secured a new home having purchased a club in North Ascot, Mill Ride Golf Club. Members fully moved to the new location in January 2026 and since then the club has benefitted from significant investment in the facilities and course. The Maidenhead Golf Club is a private members club.
