= Newburgh On Ythan Golf Club =

Golf club in Aberdeenshire, Scotland

Coordinates: 57.313°N 2.001°W

Newburgh On Ythan Golf Club was founded in 1888 and is one of the oldest golf courses in Scotland. Located in Aberdeenshire, the course was originally presented to the people of the tiny fishing village of Newburgh for their enjoyment. The Golf Links is a par 72, competition standard scratch 72, measuring 6,423 yards.

The course originally comprised 18 holes, but was reduced to nine holes after World War I. It was extended back to 18 holes in 1996.

According to a golf travel article republished by Scottish Golf View from Golf Digest, Crown Prince Vajiravudh of Siam stayed in Newburgh in 1897 and learned to play golf at the local links while staying at the Udny Arms Hotel.

In 2001 the clubhouse was officially opened by the former British Open Champion, Paul Lawrie. In 2008 the course held the North East District Men's Amateur Open Championship, a Scottish Golf Union Order of Merit ranking event.

In 2023, after a loss of members, the OGV Group took over management of the Newburgh-on-Ythan golf club.
