= Aspley Guise & Woburn Sands Golf Club =

Golf club in Bedfordshire, England

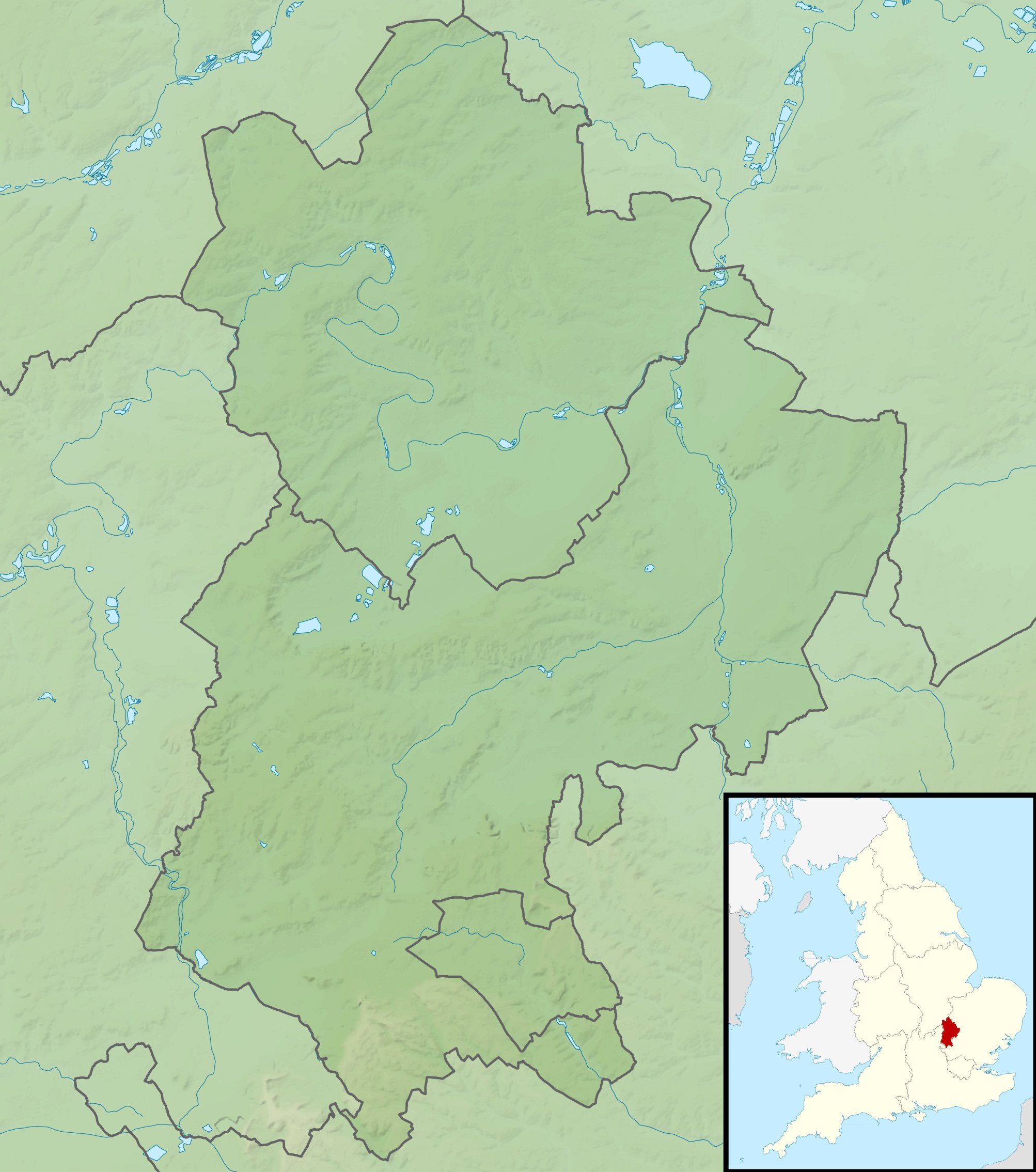
- Location within Bedfordshire
- 52°0′55″N 0°38′20″W

Club information
- Location: Near Woburn Sands and Aspley Guise, Bedfordshire, England
- Established: 1914
- Tota holes: 18
- Website: www.aspleyguisegolfclub.co.uk
- Par: 71
- Length: 6100 yards

Aspley Guise & Woburn Sands Golf Club is a golf club in Bedfordshire, England, situated between the village of Aspley Guise and the town of Woburn Sands (Buckinghamshire). It was originally established in 1914 as a 9-hole golf course, with a further 9 holes opened in 1974. The course is ranked as the fifth best golf course in the county by the website Top 100 Golf Courses.

The course is based upon designs by Sandy Heard and is a mixture of mature parkland and heath.
