= Bedford & County Golf Club =

Golf club in Bedfordshire, England

- Location within Bedfordshire
- 52°10′2″N 0°28′47″W

Club information
- Location: Near Clapham, Bedfordshire, England
- Established: 1912
- Tota holes: 18

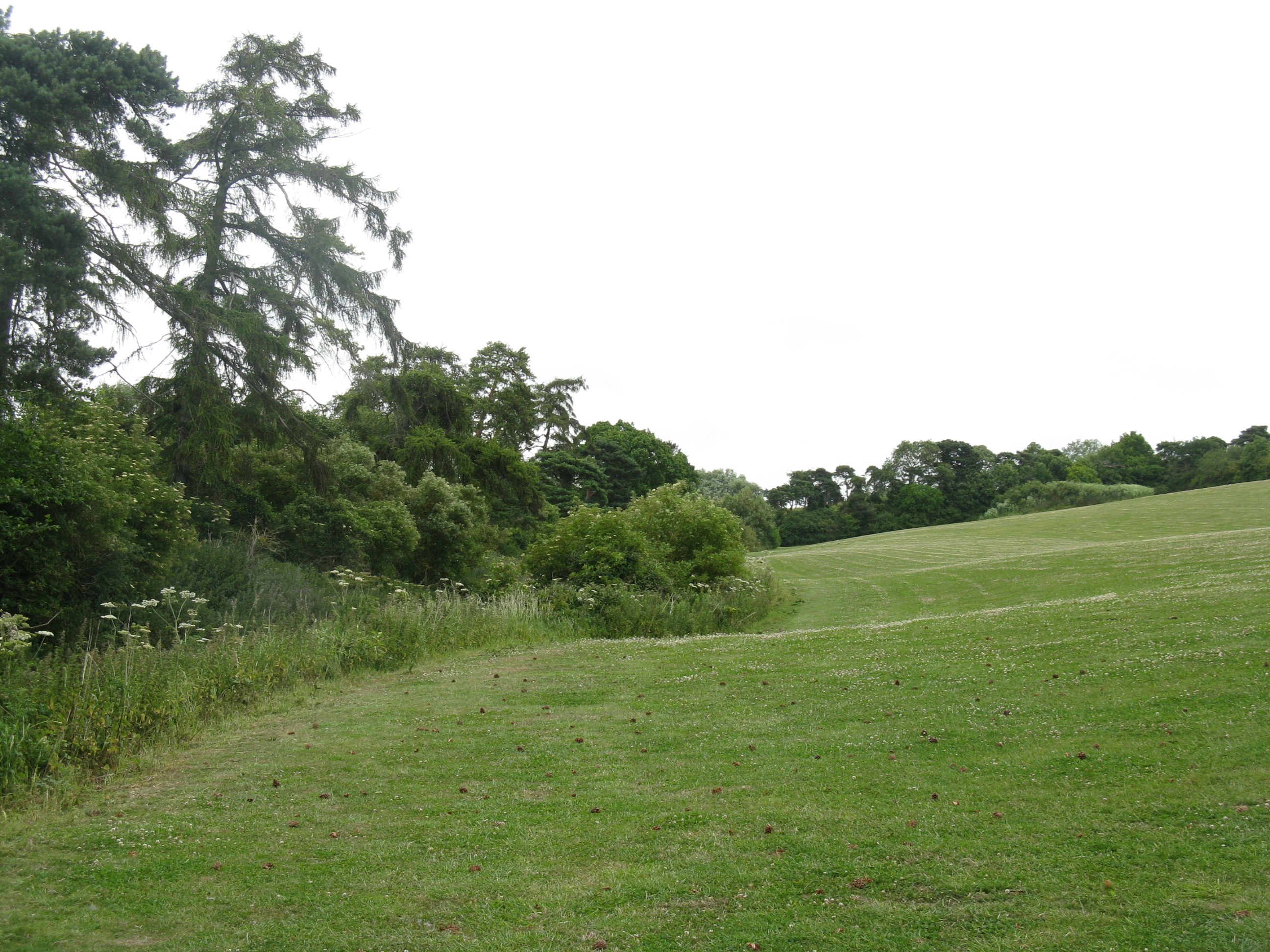
Bedford & County Golf Club in 2011

Bedford & County Golf Club is a golf club to the northeast of Clapham, Bedfordshire, England. It was established in 1912. As of 1995 the course measured 6,290 yards.
