= Buxton and High Peak Golf Club =

Golf course in Derbyshire, England

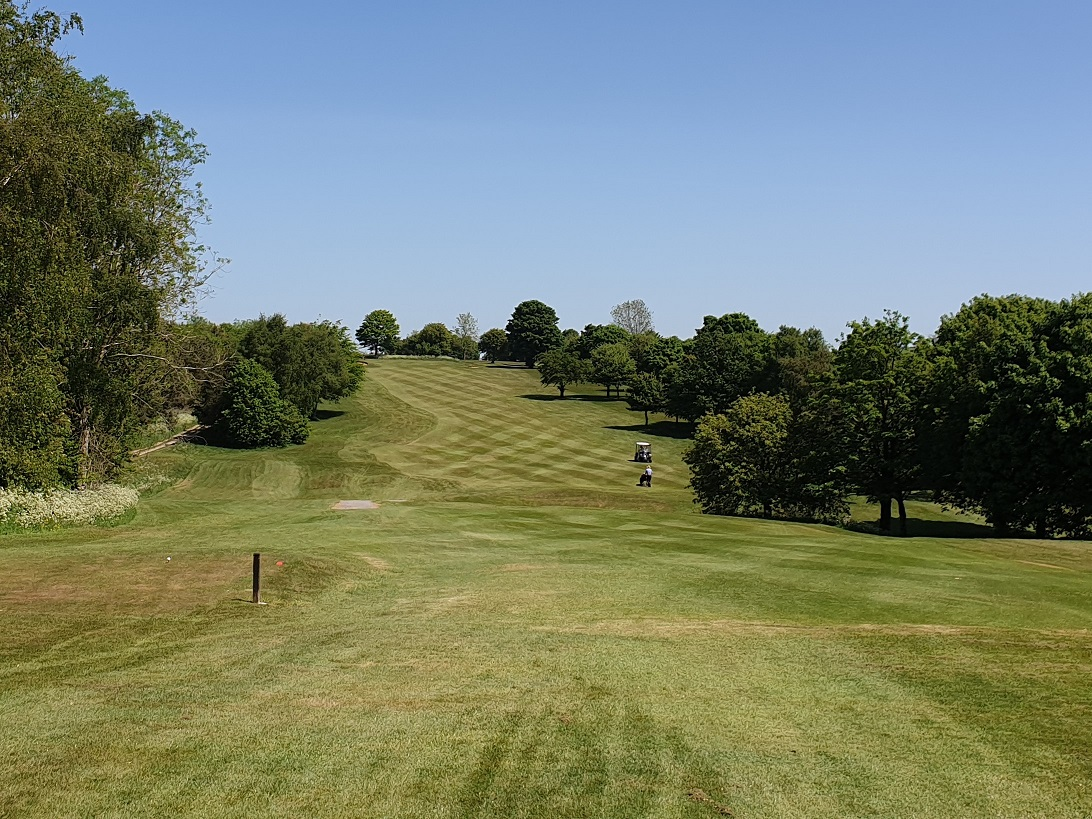
- 15th fairway

- Location in the Borough of High Peak
- 53.2641°N 1.8947°W

Club information
- Location: Buxton, Derbyshire, England
- Elevation: 320-340m
- Established: 1887
- Type: Private
- Tota holes: 18
- Website: https://www.bhpgc.co.uk/
- Designed by: John Morris
- Par: 69
- Length: 5,993 yards (5,480 m)

Buxton and High Peak Golf Club at Fairfield near Buxton in Derbyshire opened in 1887. The course is 5,993 yards (5,480 m) long with a par of 69. It is the oldest golf course in Buxton and one of the oldest in Derbyshire.

Peak Practice golf driving range at Barms Farm is located next to the course. The A6 road runs across the course and golfers have to make their way across to reach the 8th to 10th holes.

Buxton and High Peak Golf Club was founded in 1887. The nine-hole course on Barms Common (now known as Fairfield Common) was designed by John Morris from Hoylake. Local architect William Radford Bryden won the inaugural championship. The course was extended to 18 holes in 1893. The club rented the land from the Borough Council, which had agreed to buy the grazing rights on Fairfield Common from the local farmers. Jack Simpson (winner of the 1884 Open Championship) was recruited as the club's first golf professional. The clubhouse, funded by debentures, was built in 1905 on Waterswallows Road. Edward Cavendish, the Marquess of Hartington (heir to the Dukedom of Devonshire), presented a competition trophy to the club and the Hartington Cup has been played for since 1920.

The 9th par 5 hole is called Standside, which refers to where the grandstand of Buxton Racecourse once stood. The horse racing track was laid out on the common in the early 1800s. From 1821 race meetings were held each year in June. The Duke of Devonshire commissioned a grandstand building which stood in the 1830s. Buxton racecourse closed in 1840 and the grandstand was pulled down.

In 1899 the Ladies Golf Club's nine hole course was set out on Temple Meads (which was developed as a housing estate in the 1960s). Cavendish Golf Club is the other remaining golf course in Buxton and it was opened in 1925.
