= South Beds Golf Club =

Golf club in Bedfordshire, England

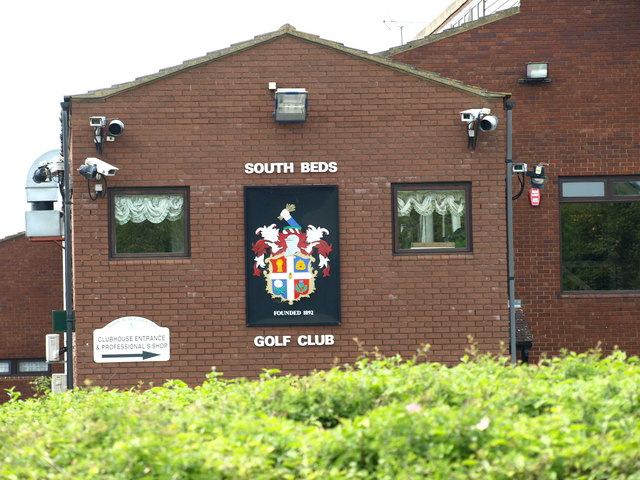

- Location within Bedfordshire
- 51°55′43″N 0°25′10″W

Club information
- Location: Gall, Bedfordshire, England
- Established: 1892
- Tota holes: 27

South Beds Golf Club is a golf club in Galley Hill, near Bramingham and north of Luton, Bedfordshire, England. It was established in 1892 and is ranked as the fourth best golf course in the county by the website Top 100 Golf Courses.
