= Blackwell Grange Golf Club =

Coordinates: 54.510°N 1.575°W

Blackwell Grange Golf Club is a golf club situated in the Blackwell area of Darlington, County Durham, in the North East of England.

== History ==
Blackwell Golf Club opened in 1931 as a nine-hole course within the grounds of Blackwell Hall. The original clubhouse was a wooden building that had been the British Pavilion at the 1930 Antwerp Trade Fair. The club adopted its current name in 1970 when the course was extended to 18 holes on land leased from the Darlington Corporation adjacent to Blackwell Grange. In 2006, the course acquired an unusual feature, as two mobile phone masts disguised as trees were erected by the side of the fourth fairway. In 2013, the club purchased nearby Stressholme Golf Club from the local council, and relocated from its former home surrounding Blackwell Grange.
