= Fairfield, Derbyshire =

District of Buxton, Derbyshire, England

Coordinates: 53.2633°N 1.9029°W

Fairfield
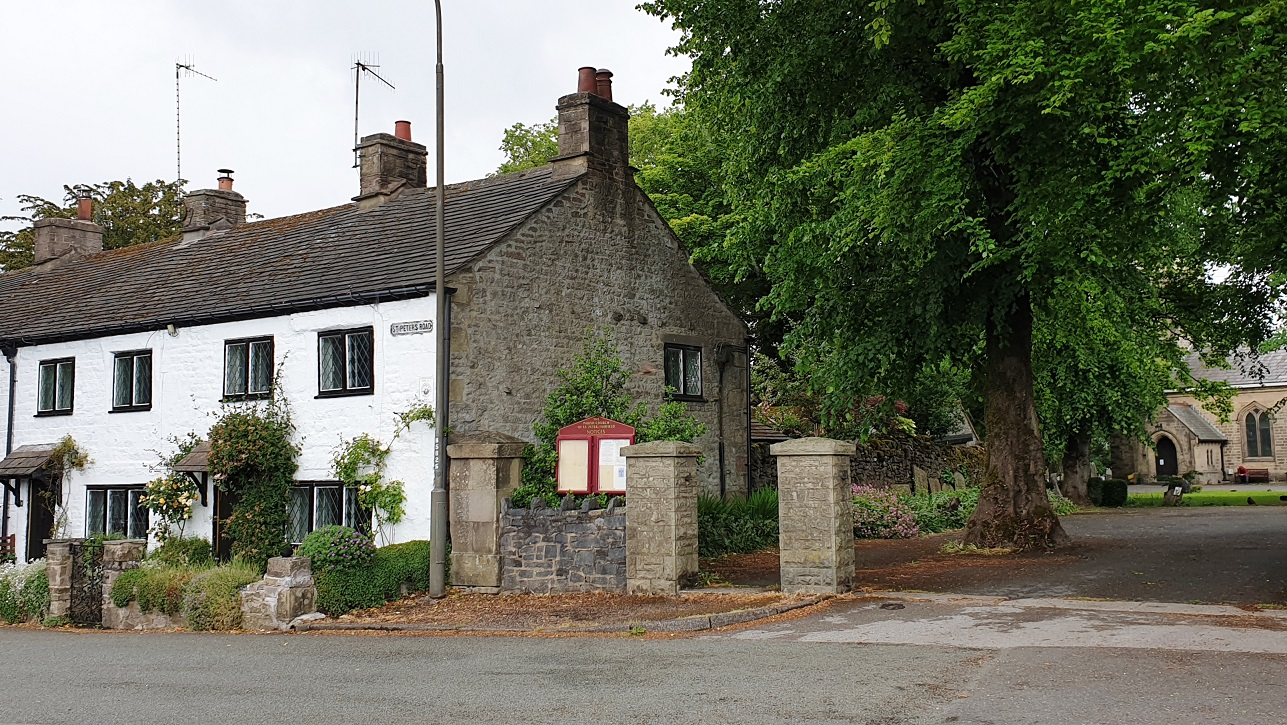
- St Peters Road

- Location within Derbyshire
- OS grid reference: SK066740
- District: High Peak
- Shire county: Derbyshire
- Region: East Midlands
- Country: England
- Sovereign state: United Kingdom
- Post town: Buxton
- Postcode district: SK17
- Police: Derbyshire
- Fire: Derbyshire
- Ambulance: East Midlands

Fairfield is a district of Buxton, in the High Peak of Derbyshire, England. The historic medieval village of Fairfield was centred around a village green.

== Location ==
Fairfield is located on the A6 road half a mile to the north east of Buxton's town centre, 340m above sea level. Fairfield is at the head of the narrow dry gorge of Cunningdale, which is part of the Wye Valley Site of Special Scientific Interest (SSSI).

== History ==
The name Fairfield derives from the Germanic faeger feld meaning 'fair open land', because of its good volcanic soil for pasture. Cistercian monks and Benedictine nuns founded monastic granges at Fairfield in the early 1200s AD (Nunsfield Farm still exists). In the 13th century Fairfield (being north of the River Wye) was within the Royal Forest of Peak, a hunting ground for the king. Fairfield was a chapelry in the parish of Hope (whereas Buxton was in the Bakewell parish). Fairfield and Buxton shared a medieval corn mill on the Wye in Mill Dale, where Ashwood Park is now. Fairfield became a town in its own right, complete with town council. The township covered the land north of the River Wye, including The Park and Devonshire Park, until 1859 when a boundary change moved them into Buxton town. In 1811, 1821 and 1831, the chapelry of Fairfield returned a population of 482 inhabitants in the national censuses. In 1866 Fairfield became a separate civil parish, in 1894 Fairfield became an urban district, on 1 January 1917 the district was abolished and merged with Buxton, on 1 April 1974 the parish was abolished and became part of the unparished area of Buxton. In 1951 the parish had a population of 7979.

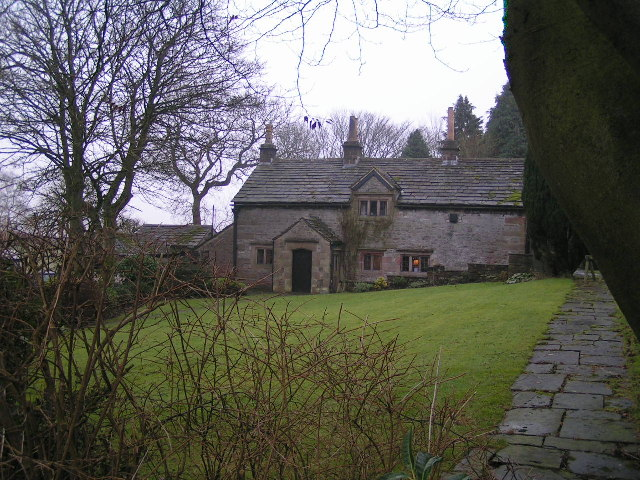
Fairfield, Derbyshire

The first chapel was built in Fairfield between 1240 and 1255. Fairfield Church was built in c.1595 and was demolished in 1838 to be replaced by the present St. Peter's (Church of England). Lying just north of the 'Green', the church was built in 1839, designed by William Swan, the village schoolmaster. St Peter's is a Grade II listed building. John Wesley visited Fairfleld in September 1784. Fairfield Wesleyan chapel on Waterswallows Road was built in 1868, replacing the first Methodist chapel which was erected in 1844. After 1887 it was used as the Fairfield Local Board Town Hall.

The Bull's Head pub on Fairfield Road replaced the previous one which was demolished in 1903.

George Kitchen, the Everton, West Ham United and Southampton goalkeeper, was born in Fairfield in 1876. He died in 1965.

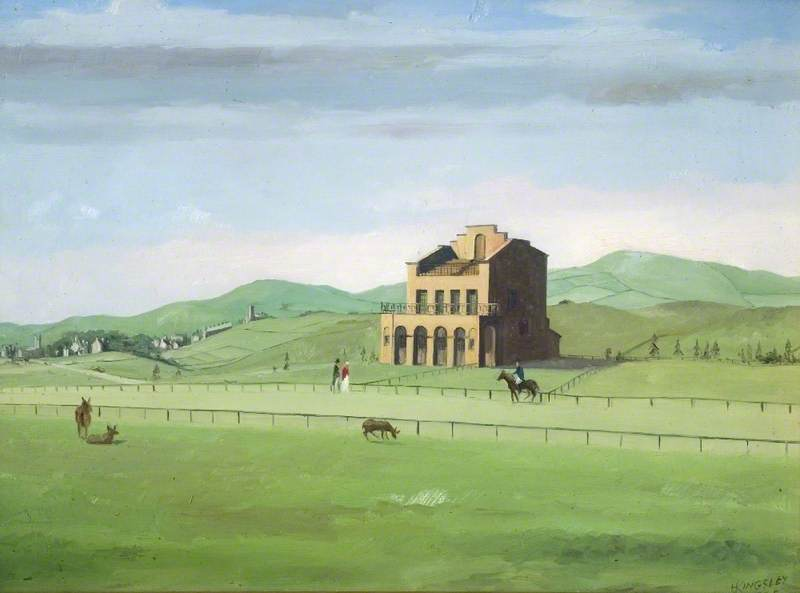
Fairfield racecourse in 1825

== Fairfield Common ==
Fairfield Common was established centuries ago as common grazing land. It was originally known as The Barms Common. Buxton Racecourse was laid out on the common in the early 1800s. From 1821 horse racing and cock fighting meetings were held each year in June. The Duke of Devonshire commissioned a grandstand building which stood in the 1830s. In 1835 The Commercial Directory for Derbyshire wrote that an "excellent round course has been formed where horse races take place". Buxton racecourse closed in 1840 and the grandstand was pulled down. Buxton and High Peak Golf Club was founded in 1887, after a nine-hole course was laid out on Fairfield Common in 1886. The course was extended to 18 holes in 1893. The 9th par 5 hole is called Standside, which refers to where the grandstand once stood.

Fairfield Halt railway station was open between 1907 and 1939. It was built on the Buxton to Manchester line, to serve the Buxton Golf Club.

The Roman road between Aquae Arnemetiae (Roman Buxton) and Melandra fort (near Glossop) runs along the western wall of Fairfield Common.

== See also ==
- Listed buildings in Fairfield, Derbyshire
