= Hartlepool Golf Club =

Coordinates: 54.7178°N 1.2376°W

Hartlepool Golf Club in England was established in 1906 and in 2006 celebrated its centenary year. The course is classified as a links course and is located on the north east coast.

The course is 6202 yards long and par for the course is 70. The course record of 62 was recorded on 8 August 1997, by professional golfer Graeme Storm, the 1999 British Amateur Champion, who learned the game there.

== History ==
The course began as a rough, 9-hole course at Hart Old Village, where the land was rented from W Purves for £10 per year. Mr. Purves was the club's first Captain and John Gardner was its first President. The Gardner Cup is still one of the club's major trophies.

In 1907 the club moved to its current location at Hart Warren, where a grassed railway embankment conceals the course from the rest of the town. The annual subscription was £1, with an entrance fee of £1. Today's amounts are £565 annual membership fees and approx £450 one off entrance fee respectively. Green fees are around £38 midweek - £45 weekends per person, however if playing with a current member it is £20 midweek and £25 weekend.

== Sources ==
- Website
- Website history preserved on Archive.org
