= Newbury & Crookham Golf Club =

Golf club in Berkshire, England

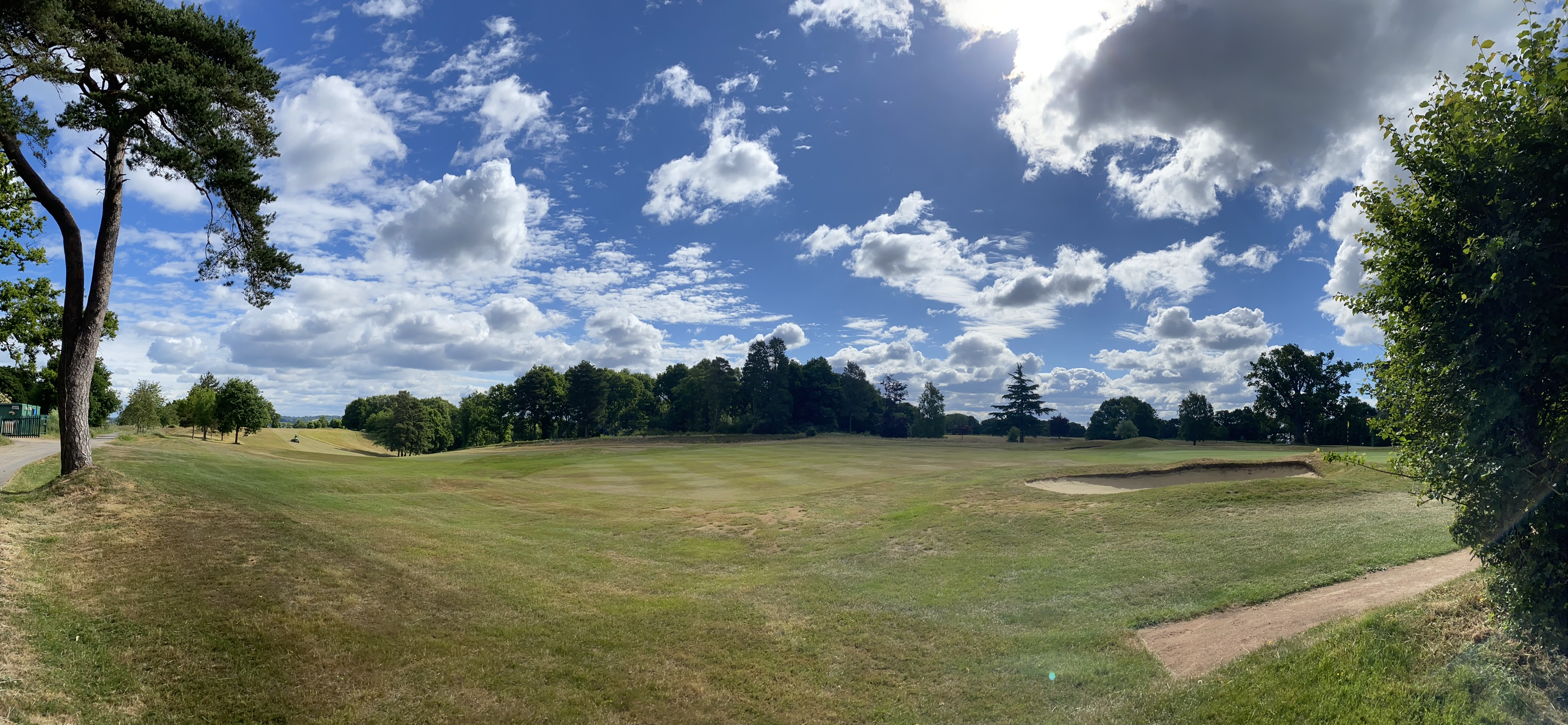

- Location within Berkshire
- 51.383333°N 1.291667°W

Club information
- Location: Greenham, Berkshire, England
- Established: 1873
- Type: Private Members club
- Owner: Members
- Operator: Newbury & Crookham Golf Club Limited
- Total holes: 18
- Website: https://www.newburygolf.co.uk/

Newbury & Crookham Golf Club is located about two miles from the centre of Newbury, Berkshire on the fringes of Greenham Common. The Club is the result of an amalgamation in 1946 of two clubs: Crookham Golf Club, founded in 1873, and Newbury District Golf Club, founded in 1923.

The present course, as envisaged for the Newbury District Golf Club, was opened for play in 1923. It was designed and constructed by John H. Turner and James Sherlock. John H. Turner was formerly engaged at RMC Camberley, Thornock, Gainsborough, Flackwell Heath, Denham, and, by 1922, Frilford Heath. His contribution was by far the greater, being responsible for most of the design of the course. James Sherlock was first engaged as a professional at Oxford University before moving to Stoke Poges and, by 1922, to Hunstanton. His best performances in the Open Championship were 6th at Sandwich in 1904 and 8th at St Andrews in 1905. He was a frequent winner of professional tournaments.

Crookham Golf Club was founded in 1873 at the initiative of Captain Robert Dashwood Fowler RN and the Rev. John Scott Ramsay who graduated MA from United College, St Andrews University in 1863 and took up a living in his first church at nearby St Paul's, Kingsclere Woodlands in 1872. During his time at St Andrews he evidently practiced "the Golf" so that, when he arrived in Kingsclere, he already had a reputation as a "well known player from St Andrews". The location of the Crookham Golf Club course was on Crookham Common adjacent to, and on the North side of the road from Newbury through Crookham. The first mention of Crookham Golf Club was in the Berkshire Chronicle on 3 May 1873 with a call to people interested in becoming members of the Club. They adopted a local hostelry, the Traveller's Friend, as their "Clubhouse".

There certainly seem to have been some holes of interest on the Crookham course. One of note was the 13th named The Avenue. The Avenue was a line of lime trees, still visible today on Greenham Common. Play to the green was over these trees. Horace Hutchinson, a noted golfer in his day, described it as “A short hole played over an avenue of tall trees. It was not a blind hole as you could just get a glimpse of the flag between the stems.” He went on to say that “Some of our course constructors might make a note of this hole; and might do worse than copy it. I should say that one of its kind a round is enough”. The length of the course direct between the holes was three miles one hundred yards, comprising 18 holes two of which were used going out and coming in.

The aforementioned Horace Huthchinson won the Open Challenge Cup, now known as the Newbury & Crookham Medal, three times over the spring, autumn and spring of 1878/1879. His home club was the Royal North Devon, as the competition was an Open Challenge the best players of the day would come to compete for it.

The Crookham Handicap Challenge Cup, now known as the Newbury & Crookham Bogey, was the equivalent of a monthly medal. The first winner in 1874 was C.S Cunliffe, an army man from Aldershot. One of the founders, the Rev. Ramsay, was a prolific winner, with seven victories between 1874 and 1876. Another prolific winner was Captain Cecil Lyon.

The development of golf at Crookham was a convenient venue for those wanting to play in Open Golf competitions as the course was situated close to Thatcham train station on the Great Western Railway, and midway between the other three golfing venues in the south of England, Westward Ho! (Royal North Devon), Blackheath, and Wimbledon. Club membership was mainly made up of landowners, masons, bankers, flourishing tradesmen and the clergy.
