= West Berkshire Golf Club =

Golf club in Berkshire, England

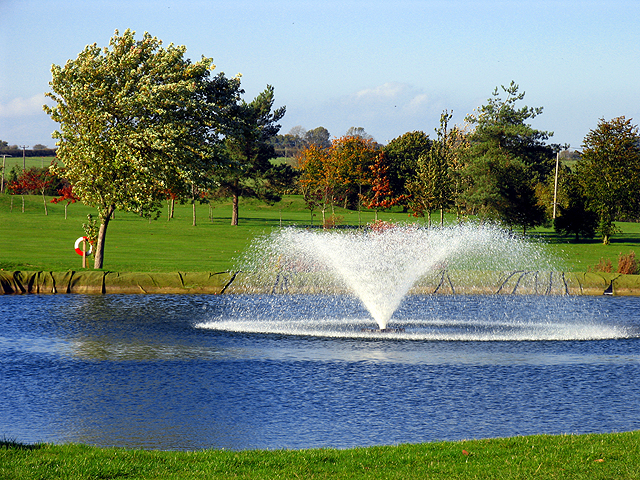

- Location within Berkshire
- 51°28′50″N 1°24′50″W

Club information
- Location: Chaddleworth, Berkshire, England
- Established: 1975
- Tota holes: 18

West Berkshire Golf Club is a golf club located in Chaddleworth, Berkshire, England. It is located about 3 miles from Woodlands St Mary. The club was established in 1975. The course was designed by Robin Stagg and Paul Simpson. The course provides a good challenge for all standards of player thanks to a choice of tee position, ranging from 5,450 yards to a championship length of over 7,000 yards. There are a total of 18 holes present in the course.
