= Ashford (Kent) Golf Club =

- Map showing the location of Ashford (Kent) Golf Club in Kent, England
- 51°10′11.3″N 0°51′15.5″E

Club information
- Location: Ashford, Kent, England
- Established: 1903
- Type: private
- Tota holes: 18
- Website: ashfordgolfclub.co.uk
- Designed by: C. K. Cotton
- Par: 71
- Length: 6,255 yards (5,720 m)

Ashford (Kent) Golf Club is a private members golf club located off the A20 road to the west of Ashford, Kent, England, close to junction 9 of the M20 motorway which leads on to the Channel Tunnel and Ports with good access to the Continent.

The present course was first laid out in 1926. With many feature pine and oak trees, narrow fairways and small greens, it provides a good test for golfers of all abilities. The club is owned by its 600 members and celebrated its centenary in 2003.

== History ==
The club was founded by twenty members on 27 April 1903. It started playing that same year on a seven-hole course at Bybrook – about a mile and a half west of the present course. The initial subscription was two guineas, and the cost of laying the course out and the first year's operations was £182.10. By the end of the second year the course had been extended to nine holes.

The club thrived in its early years with membership in the second year of 90, 40 of whom were ladies.

The First World War saw a huge decline in membership, but the club struggled through to the summer of 1918. Unaware that the armistice was just a few months away, the club decided that the course had to close, even temporarily.

The club reopened in 1919 with 90 members and a new groundsman / professional. By 1923 the membership had grown to 160.

In 1925 the lease of the then existing course was terminated but the club was offered the opportunity to buy 130 acres at Sandyhurst Farm.

Surmounting huge difficulties in raising the necessary finance, the club opened its new 18-hole course in 1927. The course was designed and construction supervised by David Herd, the professional at Littlestone Golf Club. In 1933 the club elected its first Lady President – Miss Jeanne de Casalis in recognition of her huge efforts in raising finance for the club and other local causes.

Battling financial pressures all the while the club grew steadily until the Second World War. Notwithstanding a hugely diminished membership, the loss of 20 acres of land requisitioned for food production and huge concentrations of bombing in the district play continued throughout the hostilities.

By the end of the war there were only 46 members left. Nevertheless, the club picked up again after the war. The missing 20 acres were sold and the course re-designed on the remaining 100 acres with C K Cotton retained as architect.

The club grew gradually until 1962, with about 250 members. In that year no fewer than 140 new members were elected and the club appointed its first paid part-time secretary/treasurer. A waiting list was created and joining fees created. Membership stood at about 550 in 1965.

The last major upheaval occurred in 1980, when land was taken for the construction of the motorway, including the previous clubhouse. Additional land was leased from Ashford Borough Council, the course re-modelled and the present clubhouse constructed.
