= Golf in Wales =

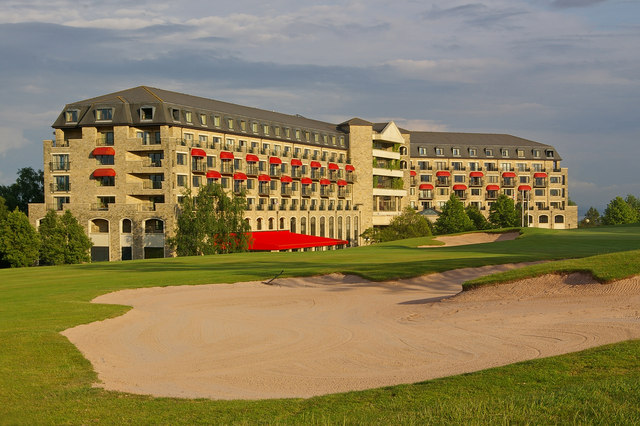
Celtic Manor Resort host to the 2010 Ryder Cup

Golf is a popular sport in Wales. Although the sport of golf in Great Britain is most associated with Scotland, where it was established and developed, Wales can record its first courses back to the 1880s, and today has over 200 clubs. The first amateur golf competition was held in 1895, and the first professional championship was in 1904. Wales has produced several players of note, including one player, Ian Woosnam, who has won one of the Men's major golf championships and Wales has twice won the men's World Cup, in 1987 and 2005, respectively. Wales also hosted the Ryder Cup, when it was held at Newport's Celtic Manor Resort in 2010.

== History ==
The sport of golf in Wales traces its origins to the 1880s. The earliest course was constructed in Pontnewydd in Monmouthshire in 1875, but this was a short course. By the mid-1880s nine-hole courses were built at several sites in Wales on coastal common land where the turf was acceptable. Several sites claim to be home to the oldest golf club in Wales, though it is generally accepted that Tenby, formed in 1888, was the first, with evidence that the game was played there from at least 1875. Another early course is found stretching between Borth and Ynyslas being in use from 1885. Other 19th-century courses, again all coastal, include Conwy (1890), Penarth (1890), Porthcawl (1891) and Aberdyfi (1892). The opening of the early railway lines and the growing tourism in Wales gave these new courses opportunities to attract visitors. Though, as the golf clubs of Wales were initially created and run by the middle class, the sport suffered from a view as being English and elitist.

From its early days, Wales has embraced both male and female golfers. The Welsh Golfing Union was formed in 1895, the second oldest in the World behind its Irish counterpart, while the Welsh Ladies' Golf Union was founded in 1904. Wales Golf, which governs the sport in Wales, was founded in 2007 after the merger of the Welsh Ladies Golf Union and the Welsh Golfing Union.

== Welsh golfers ==
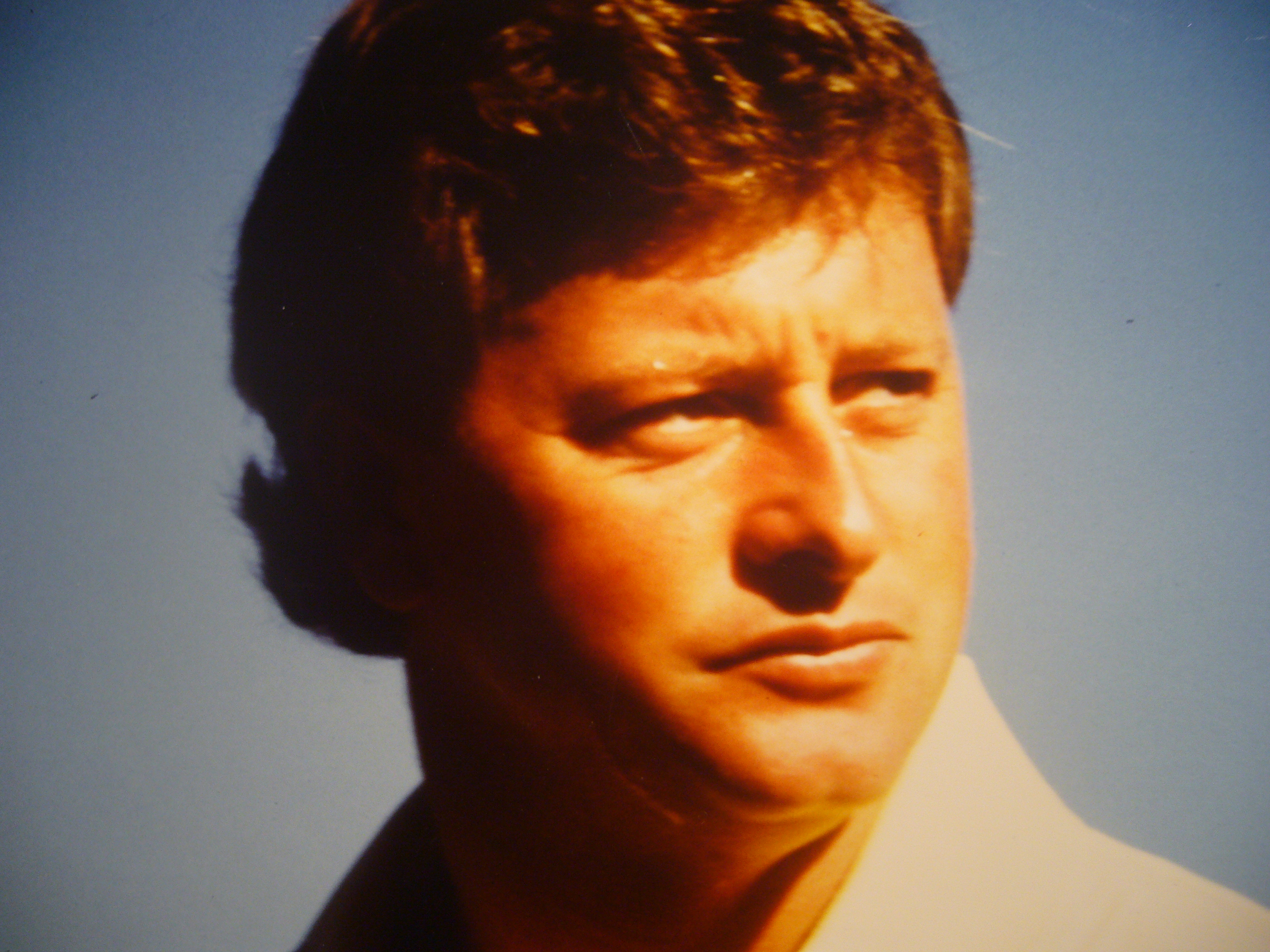
Woosnam in 1989

Dai Rees was one of the first successful Welsh golfers, captaining a winning European Ryder Cup team in 1957. Wales has won the golfing World Cup on two occasions, with the pairing of David Llewellyn and Ian Woosnam lifting the trophy in Hawaii in 1987, and again in 2005, with Stephen Dodd and Bradley Dredge winning in Portugal.

Ian Woosnam is one of Wales' most notable players. Not only winning the 1987 World Cup, he is also the only Welshman to have won a major championship, when he took the 1991 Masters Tournament at Augusta. That year he also reached the number one spot on the Official World Golf Rankings, spending 50 weeks at the top of the rankings, only four golfers have held the title longer. Woosnam then followed countryman Rees' achievement when he led Europe to victory against the USA in the 2006 Ryder Cup.

Wales has supplied seven members of the British and European Ryder cup teams. The first was Bert Hodson, who played for Charles Whitcombe's 1931 team. Hodson played in only one round, losing to an in-form Denny Shute. Dai Rees played in three Ryder Cups, and his captaincy in 1957 was the only time the Americans were beaten between 1933 and 1985. Dave Thomas played in four Ryder Cups between 1959 and 1967, losing only one of his five singles matches. Brian Huggett played in six Ryder Cups and in 1977 was the sides non-player captain, the last time a British and Irish-only team contested the tournament. Woosnam played in eight consecutive teams, and in 2002 Phillip Price memorably beat Phil Mickelson in his singles match. Jamie Donaldson played in the 2014 Ryder Cup, beating Keegan Bradley 5 & 3 ensuring Europe won the Ryder Cup.

Meanwhile, Becky Brewerton played at the 2007 and 2009 Solheim Cup. She also finished third at the 2009 Ladies European Tour.

== Tournaments in Wales ==
The first Welsh Amateur Championship in Wales was held in 1895 at Aberdovey Golf Club and then in 1901 the club became the first in Wales to host the British Ladies Amateur Golf Championship. The first professional golf championship was in Radyr near Cardiff in 1904 while the first Welsh Ladies' Amateur Championship was played in 1905. A Welsh team first competed in the Women's Home Internationals in 1907. In recent years Wales has held several annual golfing events, notably the Wales Challenge (founded in 2003), Wales Ladies Championship of Europe (1996) and the Wales Seniors Open (2001). Despite the heightened profile of golf in Wales generated by the Ryder Cup in 2010 all three tournaments were scrapped in 2011. The Wales Seniors Open is planned for a return in 2012 at Conwy Golf Course, while it has been announced that the 2014 Senior British Open Championship will be held at Royal Porthcawl Golf Club, the first time the event will be held in Wales. Royal Porthcawl is one of the most notable of Welsh courses and in the past has hosted the 1995 Walker Cup, The Amateur Championship on six occasions and the Wales Ladies Championship.

The Celtic Manor Resort in Newport, South Wales was the venue for the 2010 Ryder Cup; the first time the event was held in Wales. Europe beat the US by 14½ points to 13½ in one of the most dramatic finishes to the tournament in recent years. The event also made history by becoming the first Ryder Cup to stretch over four days, following heavy rain throughout the weekend.

== Courses ==
Wales is home to roughly 200 golf courses. The first appeared in the late 19th century, mainly links courses, most notably at Aberdyfi, Borth and Ynyslas, Conwy, Penarth, Porthcawl, St David's and Tenby. Cardiff's first club was at Radyr (1902), while other courses in Wales to appear that decade include those at Old Colwyn, Brecon and Porthmadog. Courses continued to appear in Wales throughout the early 20th century, including 14 designed by James Braid. In 1908, St David's Golf Club was granted Royal patronage by King Edward VII, becoming the first Welsh club to be granted the honour. Porthcawl became the second and last club in Wales to receive the title the following year.

=== Carmarthenshire ===
- Ashburnham Golf Club – Burry Port
- Carmarthen Golf Club – Carmarthen
- Derllys Court Golf Club – Carmarthen
- Garnant Park Golf Club – Ammanford
- Glynhir Golf Club – Ammanford
- Glyn Abbey Golf Club – Kidwelly
- Machynys Peninsula Golf & Country Club – Llanelli

=== Ceredigion ===
- Aberystwyth Golf Club – Aberystwyth
- Borth & Ynyslas Golf Club – Borth
- Cardigan Golf Club – Cardigan
- Cilgwyn Golf Club – Llangybi
- Penrhos Park Golf Club – Llanrhystud
- Cwmrhydneuadd Golf Club – Pentre-gat

=== Clwyd ===
- Abergele Golf Club - Abergele
- Bryn Morfydd Hotel Golf Club – Denbigh
- Caerwys Golf Club – Mold
- Chirk Golf & Country Club – Wrexham
- Clays Golf Club – Wrexham
- Denbigh Golf Club – Denbigh
- Flint Golf Club – Flint
- Hawarden Golf Club – Deeside
- Holywell Golf Club – Holywell
- Kinmel Park Golf Club – Rhyl
- Mold Golf Club – Mold -
- Moss Valley Golf Club – Wrexham
- Northop Country Park Golf Club – Chester
- Old Padeswood Golf Club – Mold
- Padeswood & Buckley Golf Club – Mold
- Prestatyn Golf Club – Prestatyn
- Rhuddlan Golf Club – Rhyl
- Rhyl Golf Club – Rhyl
- Ruthin Pwllglas Golf Club – Ruthin
- Saint Idloes Golf Club – Llanidloes
- Saint Melyd Golf Club – Prestatyn
- Silver Birch Golf Club – Betws-yn-Rhos
- Vale of Llangollen Golf Club – Llangollen
- Wrexham Golf Club – Wrexham
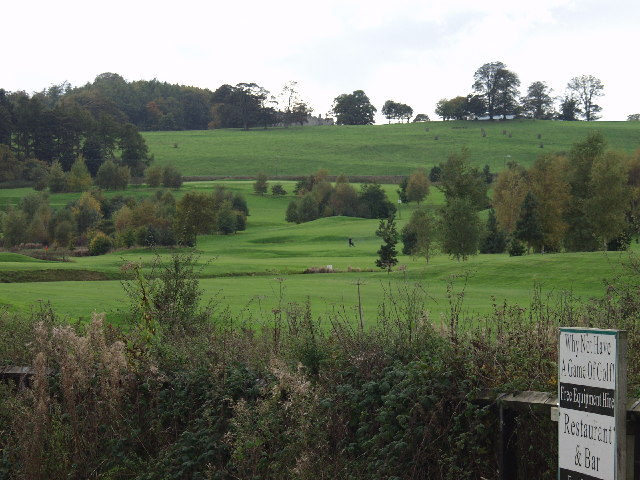
Chirk Golf & Country Club

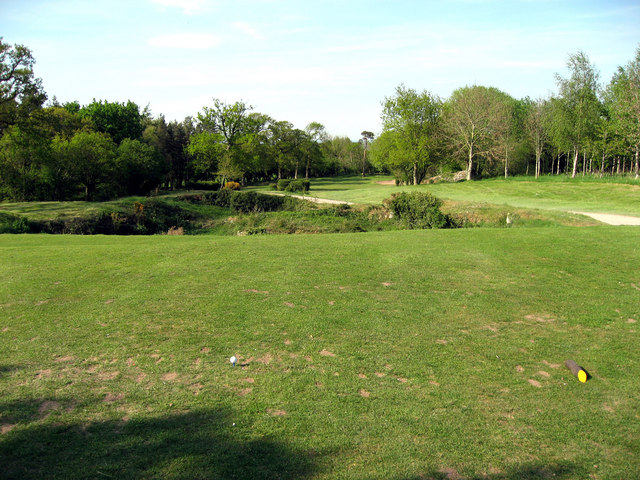
Denbigh Golf Club

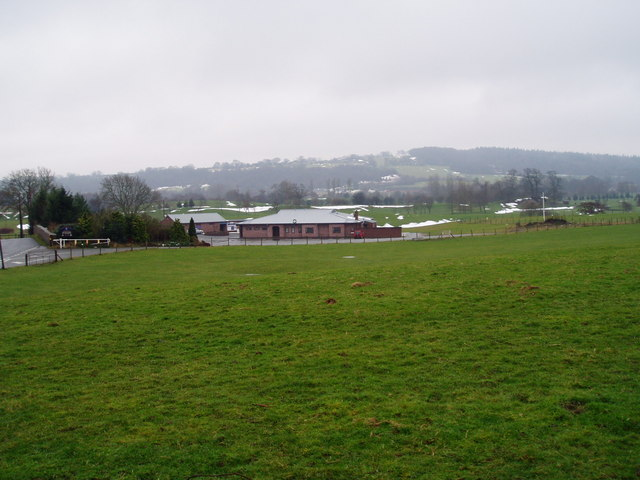
Old Padeswood Golf Club

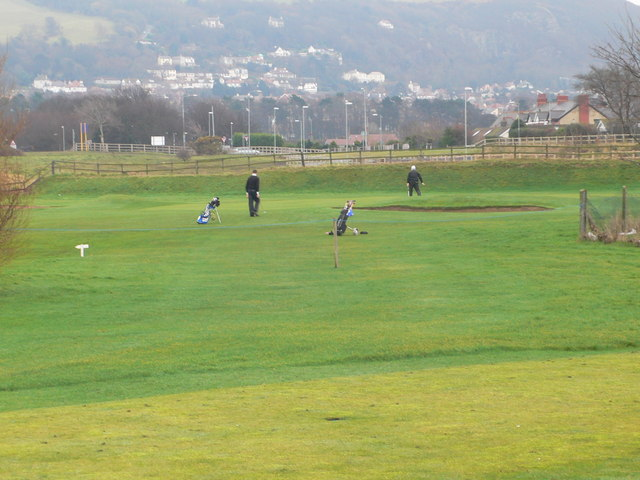
Prestatyn Golf Club

=== Glamorgan ===
- Aberdare Golf Club – Aberdare
- Allt-y-Graban Golf Club – Pontliw, Swansea
- Ashburnham Golf Club – Burry Port
- Bargoed Golf Club – Bargoed
- Bryn Meadows Golf Hotel – Hengoed
- Brynhill Golf Club – Barry
- Caerphilly Golf Club – Caerphilly
- Cardiff Golf Club – Cardiff
- Clyne Golf Club – Swansea
- Coed Y Mwstwr Golf Club – Bridgend
- Cottrell Park Golf Club – Cardiff
- Creigiau Golf Club – Cardiff
- Dinas Powis Golf Club – Dinas Powis
- Earlswood Golf Club – Neath
- Fairwood Park Golf Club – Swansea
- Glamorganshire Golf Club – Penarth
- Glyn Abbey Golf Club – Kidwelly
- Glynhir Golf Club – Ammanford
- Glynneath Golf Club – Glynneath
- Inco Golf Club – Swansea
- Langland Bay Golf Club – Swansea
- Llanishen Golf Club – Cardiff
- Llantrisant & Pontyclun Golf Club – Llantrisant
- Maesteg Golf Club – Maesteg
- Merthyr Tydfil Golf Club – Merthyr Tydfil
- Morlais Castle Golf Club – Merthyr Tydfil
- Morriston Golf Club – Swansea
- Mountain Ash Golf Club – Mountain Ash
- Mountain Lakes Golf Club – Caerphilly
- Neath Golf Club – Neath
- Palleg Golf Club – Swansea
- Pennard Golf Club – Swansea
- Peterstone Lakes Golf Club – Cardiff
- Pontardawe Golf Club – Swansea
- Pontypridd Golf Club – Pontypridd
- Pyle & Kenfig Golf Club – Bridgend
- Radyr Golf Club – Cardiff
- RAF Saint Athan Golf Club – St. Athan
- Rhondda Golf Club – Rhondda
- Royal Porthcawl Golf Club – Porthcawl
- Saint Andrews Major Golf Club – St. Andrews Major
- Saint Marys Golf Club – Bridgend
- Saint Mellons Golf Club – Cardiff
- Southerndown Golf Club – Bridgend
- Swansea Bay Golf Club – Neath
- Vale of Glamorgan Hotel Golf & Country Club – Cardiff
- Wenvoe Castle Golf Club -Wenvoe
- Whitchurch Golf Club – Cardiff
- Whitehall Golf Club – Treharris
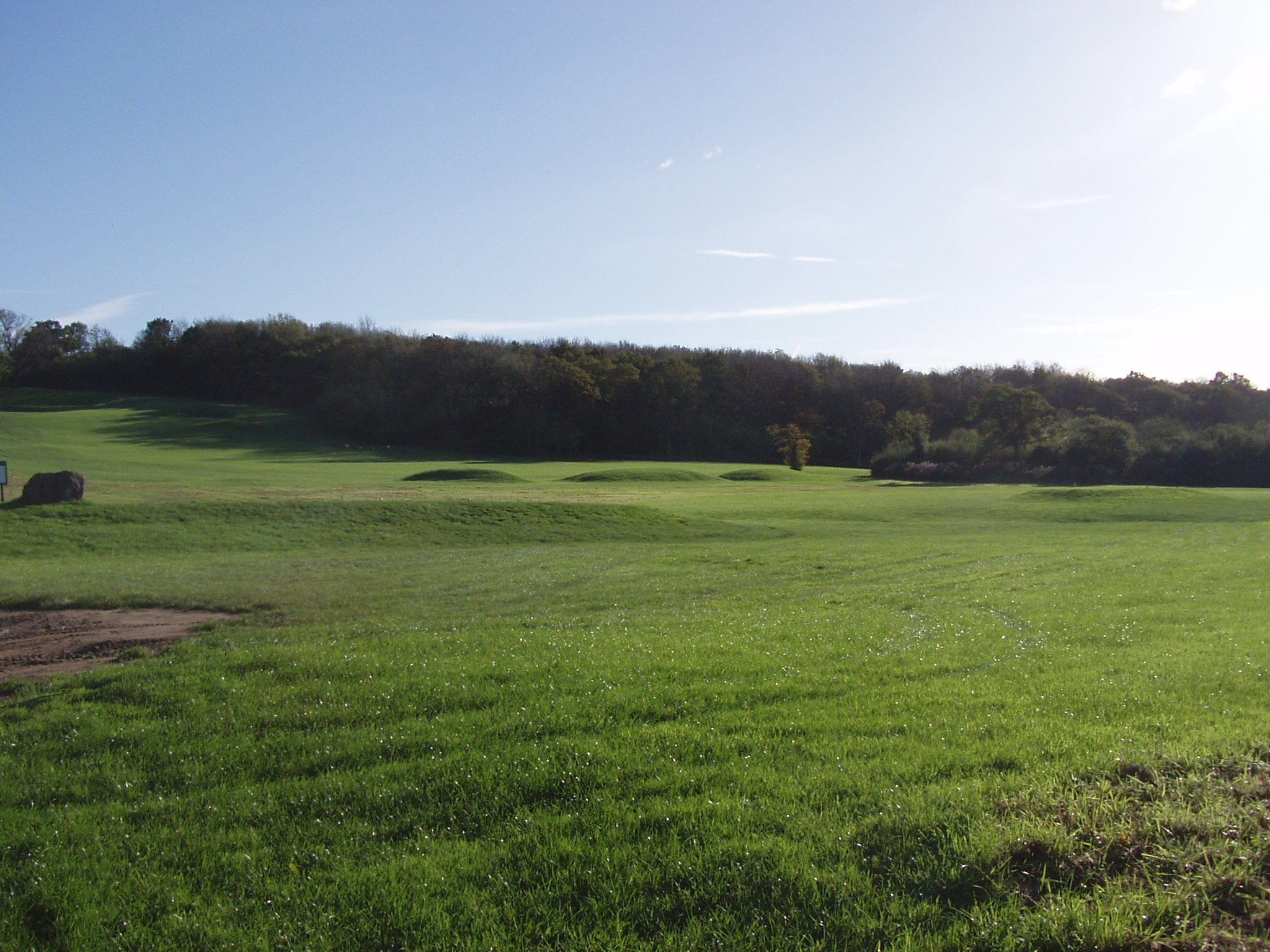
Brynhill Golf Club

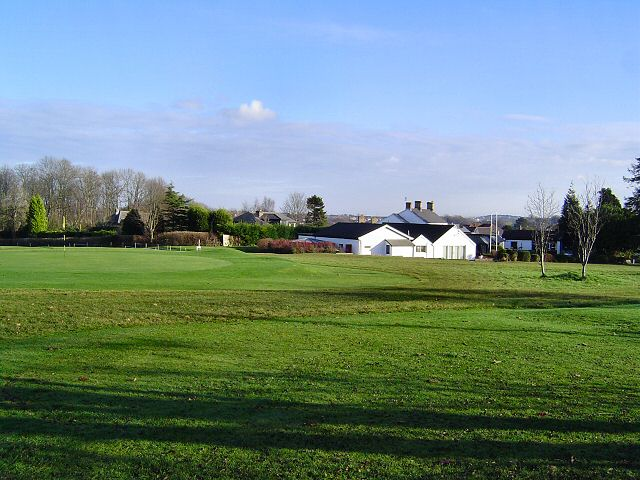
Dinas Powis Golf Club

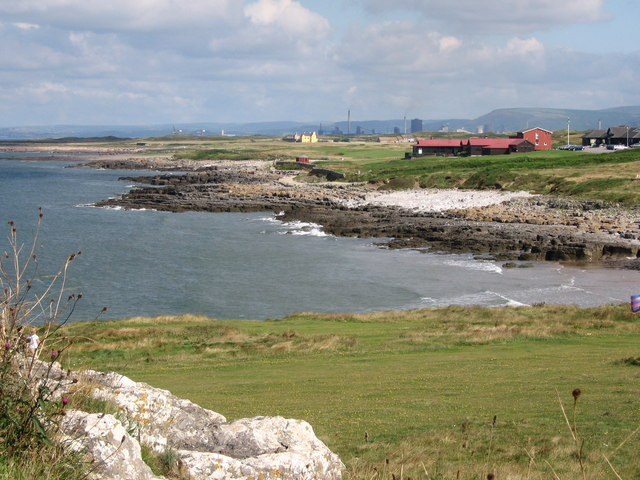
Royal Porthcawl Golf Club

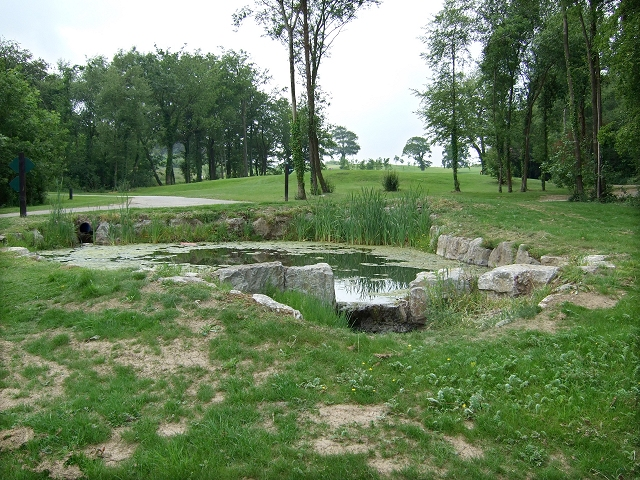
Vale of Glamorgan Golf and Country Club

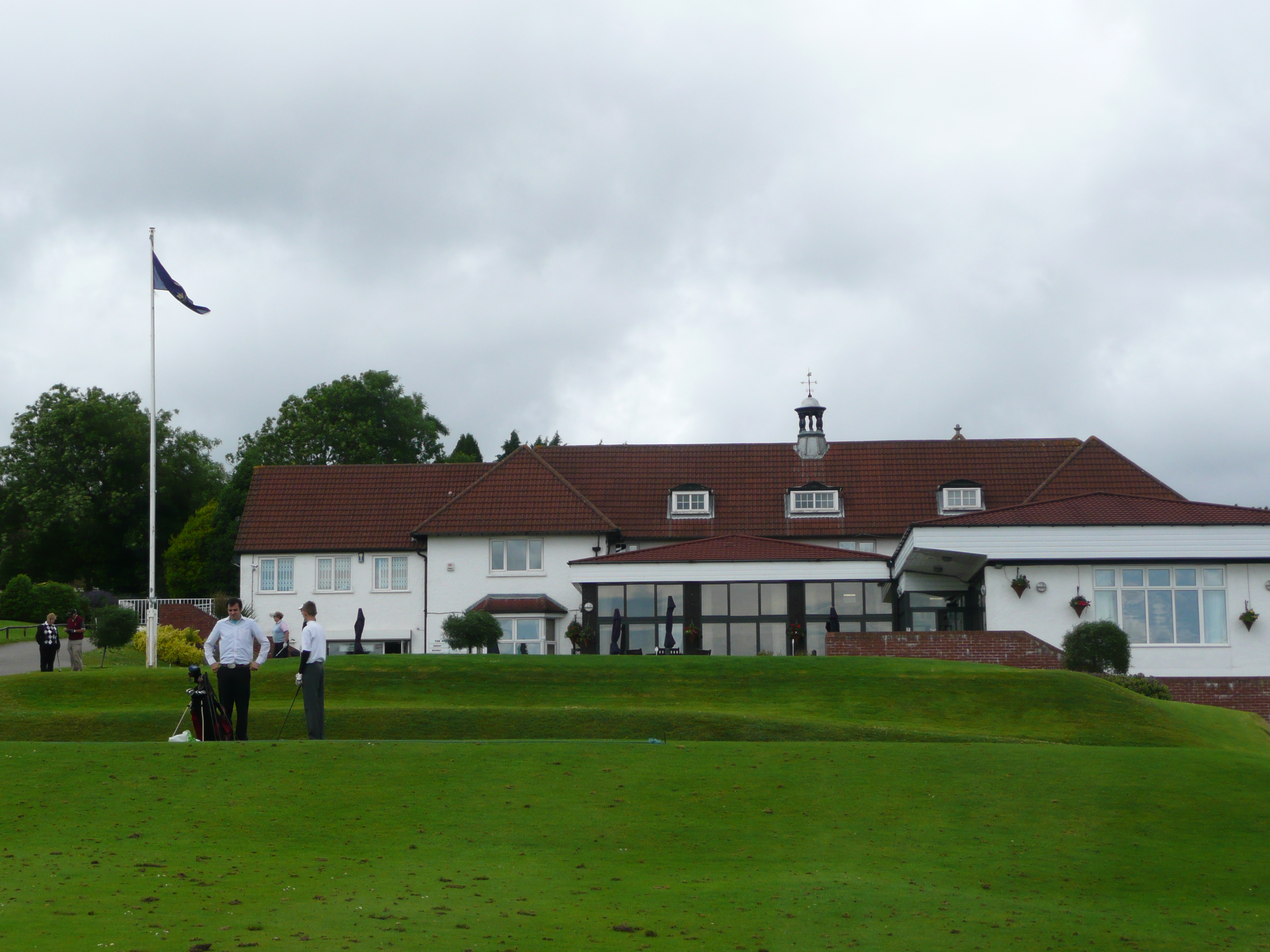
Radyr Golf Club clubhouse

=== Gwynedd ===
- Aberdovey Golf Club – Aberdyfi
- Abersoch Golf Club – Abersoch
- Betws y Coed Golf Club – Betws y Coed
- Conwy Golf Club – Conwy
- Criccieth Golf Club – Criccieth (closed)
- Dolgellau Golf Club – Dolgellau (closed)
- Llanfairfechan Golf Club – Llanfairfechan
- Maesdu Golf Club – Llandudno
- Nefyn & District Golf Club – Pwllheli
- North Wales Golf Club – Llandudno
- Penmaenmawr Golf Club – Penmaenmawr
- Porthmadog Golf Club – Porthmadog
- Pwllheli Golf Club – Pwllheli
- Rhos-on-Sea Golf Club – Rhos-on-Sea
- Royal Saint Davids Golf Club – Harlech
- Royal Town of Caernarfon Golf Club – Caernarfon
- Saint Deiniol Golf Club – Bangor
- Tyddyn Mawr Golf Course – Caernarfon
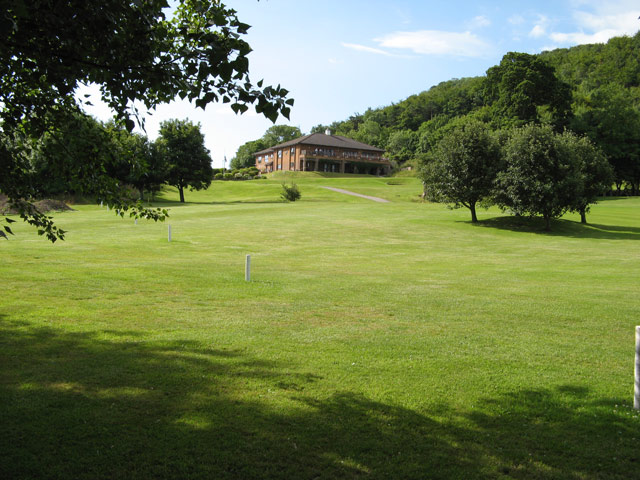
Abergele Golf Club

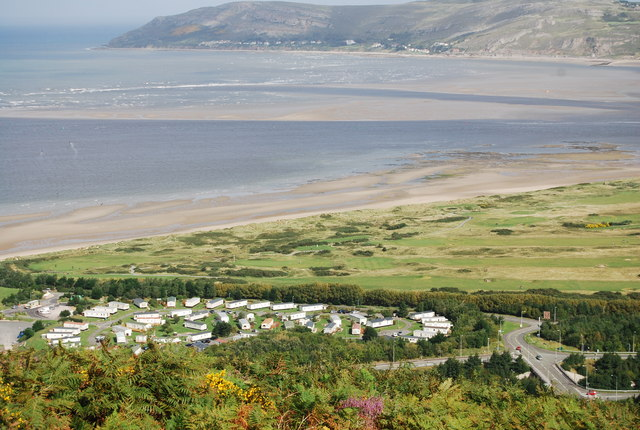
Conwy Golf Club

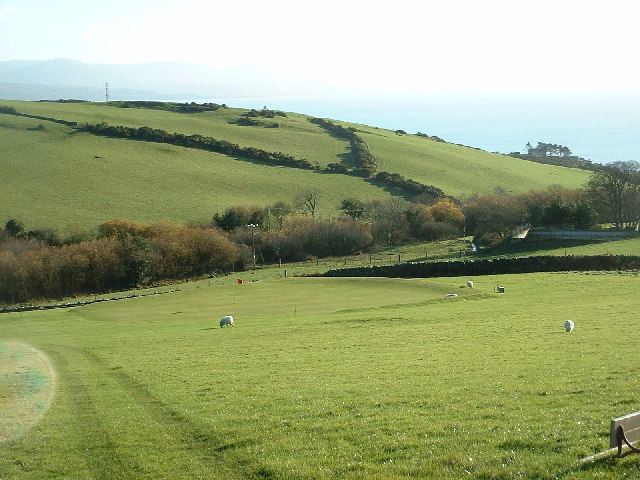
Criccieth Golf Club

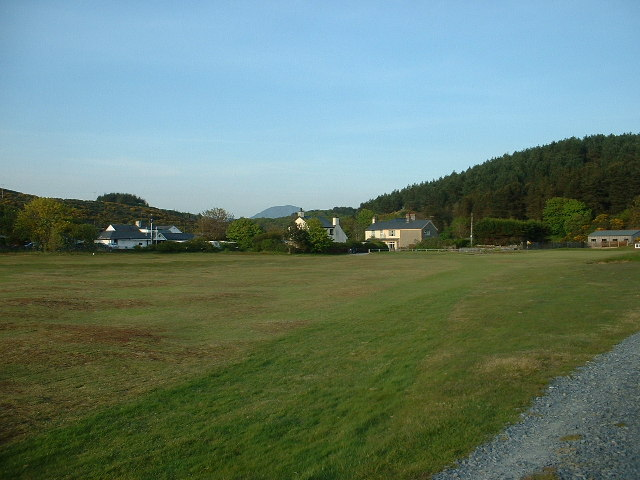
Porthmadog Golf Club

=== Isle of Anglesey ===
- Anglesey Golf Club – Rhosneigr
- Baron Hill Golf Club – Bangor
- Bull Bay Golf Club – Amlwch
- Henllys Golf Club – Beaumaris
- Holyhead Golf Club – Holyhead
- Llangefni Golf Club – Llangefni
- Storws Wen Golf Club – Brynteg
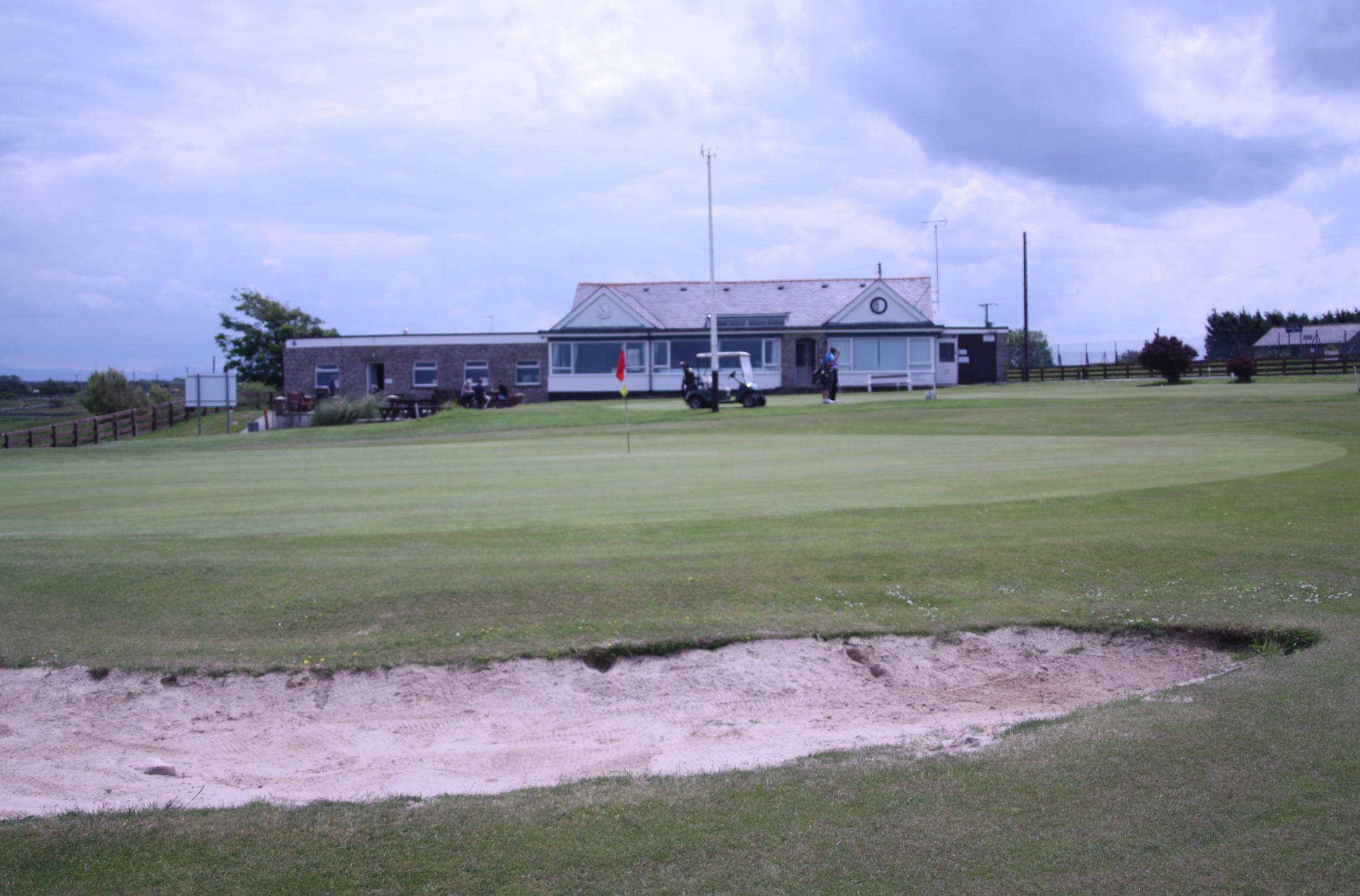
Anglesey Golf Club

=== Monmouthshire ===
- Alice Springs Golf Club – Usk
- Blackwood Golf Club – Blackwood
- Caerleon Golf Club – Caerleon
- Celtic Manor Hotel & Country Club – Newport
- Cwmbran Municipal Golf Club – Cwmbran
- Dewstow Golf Club – Caldicot
- Green Meadow Golf Club – Cwmbran
- Llanwern Golf Club – Llanwern
- Monmouth Golf Club – Monmouth
- Monmouthshire Golf Club – Abergavenny
- Newport Golf Club – Newport
- Oakdale Golf Club – Oakdale
- Pontnewydd Golf Club – Cwmbran
- Pontypool Golf Club – Pontypool
- Raglan Parc Golf Club – Raglan
- St Pierre Hotel and Country Club – Chepstow
- Shirenewton Golf Club – Chepstow
- The Rolls of Monmouth Golf Club – Monmouth
- Tredegar & Rhymney Golf Club – Tredegar
- Tredegar Park Golf Club – Newport
- Wernddu Golf Club – Abergavenny
- West Monmouthshire Golf Club – Nantyglo
- Woodlake Park Golf Club – Pontypool
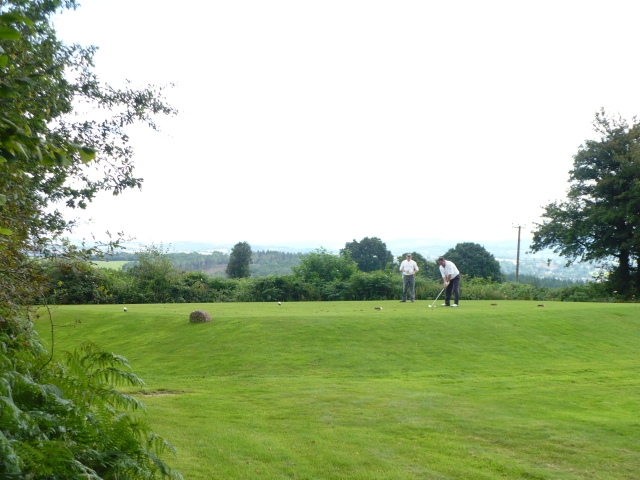
Newport Golf Club

Monmouth Golf Club

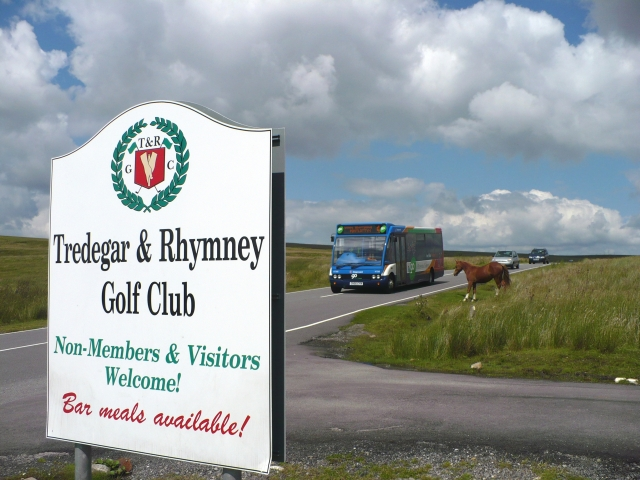
Tredegar & Rhymney Golf Club

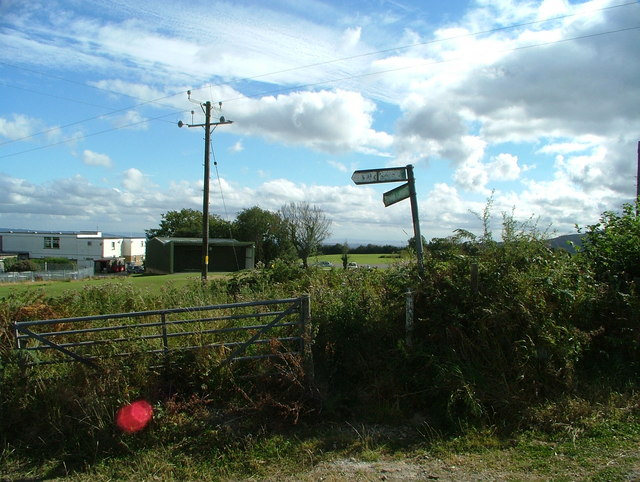
Pontypool Golf Club

=== Pembrokeshire ===
- Dawn Till Dusk Golf Club – Rosemarket
- Haverfordwest Golf Club – Haverfordwest
- Herons Brook Golf Course – Narberth
- Mayfield Golf Club – Haverfordwest
- Milford Haven Golf Club – Milford Haven
- Priskilly Forest Golf Club – Castlemorris
- St. Davids City Golf Club – St. Davids
- South Pembrokeshire Golf Club – Pembroke Dock
- Tenby Golf Club – Tenby
- Trefloyne Golf Course – Tenby

=== Powys ===
- Bala Golf Club – Bala
- Brecon Golf Club – Brecon
- Builth Wells Golf Club – Builth Wells
- Club Bala Lake Hotel Golf Club – Bala
- Cradoc Golf Club – Brecon
- Knighton Golf Club – Knighton
- Llandrindod Golf Club – Builth Wells
- Llanymynech Golf Club – Llanymynech
- Machynlleth Golf Club – Machynlleth
- Rhosgoch Golf Club – Builth Wells
- Saint Giles Newtown Golf Club – Newtown
- Welsh Border Golf Complex – Middletown
- Welshpool Golf Club – Welshpool
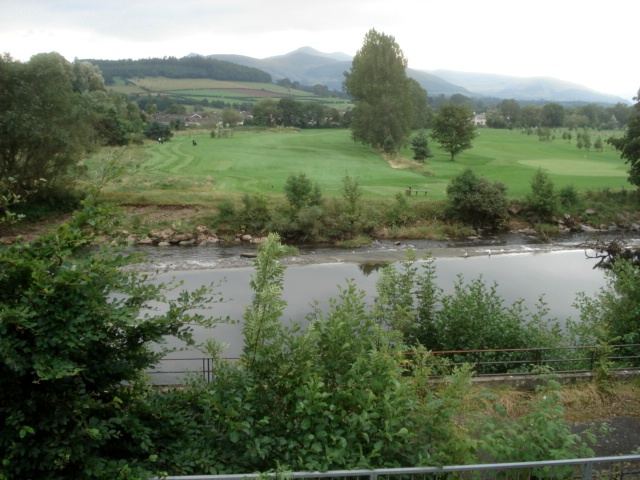
Brecon Golf Club

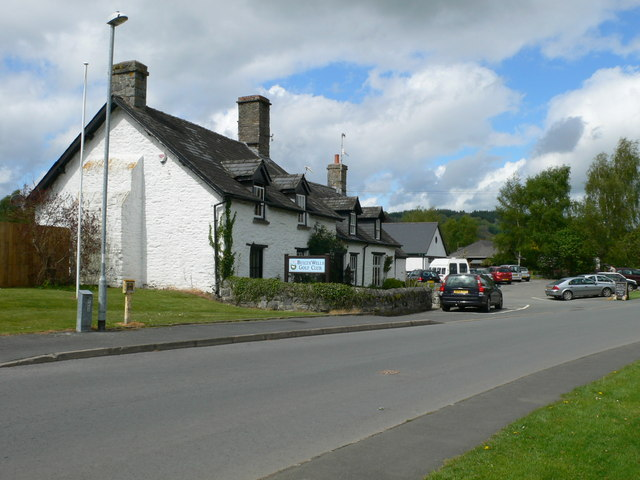
Builth Wells Golf Club

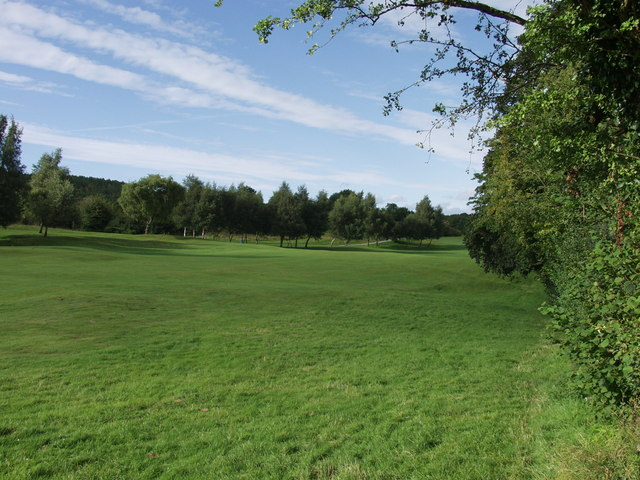
Llanymynech Golf Club

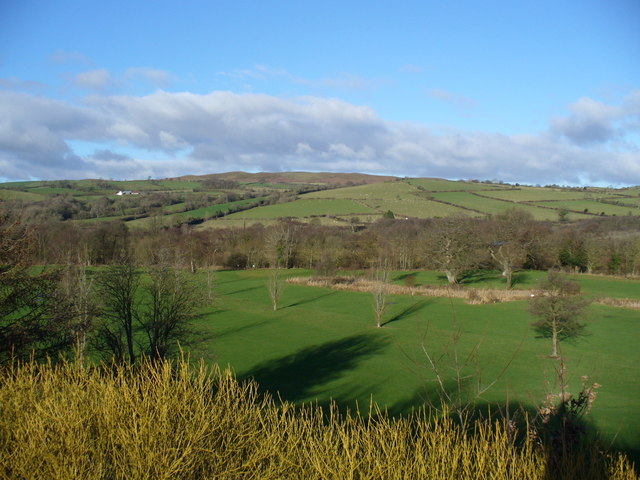
Rhosgoch Golf Club
