= List of links golf courses =

List of links and links-style golf courses

The following is a list of links golf courses; also included are many "links-style" courses and courses that share many of the features of links courses.

== Scotland ==
Dumfries and Galloway

- Southerness Golf Club, Southerness, Dumfriesshire
- Wigtownshire County Golf Club, Glenluce, Wigtownshire

Strathclyde

- Dundonald Links Golf Club, Irvine, Ayrshire
- Gailes Links Golf Club, Irvine, Ayrshire
- Irvine Golf Club, Irvine, Ayrshire
- Kilmarnock (Barassie) Golf Club – Barassie Links and Hillhouse Course, Barassie, Ayrshire
- Prestwick Golf Club, Prestwick, Ayrshire
- Prestwick St Nicholas Golf Club, Prestwick, Ayrshire
- Royal Troon Golf Club – Old Course and Portland Course, Troon, Ayrshire
- Troon Darley Golf Club, Troon, Ayrshire
- Troon Lochgreen Golf Club, Troon, Ayrshire
- Turnberry – Ailsa, King Robert the Bruce, and Arran Courses, Turnberry, Ayrshire
- West Kilbride Golf Club, West Kilbride, Ayrshire
- Western Gailes Golf Club, Irvine, Ayrshire

Argyll and Isles

- Colonsay Golf Club, Isle of Colonsay
- Dunaverty Golf Club, Southend, Kintyre
- Machrie Golf Club, Isle of Islay
- Machrihanish Golf Club – Championship Course, Campbelltown, Kintyre
- Macrihanish Dunes Golf Club, Campbelltown, Kintyre
- Shiskine Golf Club, Blackwaterfoot, Isle of Arran

Lothian

- Archerfield Links – Fidra Course and Dirleton Course, Dirleton, East Lothian
- Craigielaw Golf Club, Aberlady, East Lothian
- Dunbar Golf Club, Dunbar, East Lothian
- Gullane Golf Club –three courses, Gullane, East Lothian
- Muirfield – Gullane, East Lothian
- Kilspindie Golf Club, Aberlady, East Lothian
- Luffness New Golf Club, Aberlady, East Lothian
- Musselburgh Links Old Golf Course, Musselburgh, East Lothian
- North Berwick Golf Club – North Berwick, East Lothian
- The Renaissance Club, Dirleton, North Berwick
- Winterfield Golf Club, Dunbar, East Lothian

Fife

- Crail Golfing Society – Balcomie Links and Craighead Links, Crail, Fife
- Elie Golf Club, Elie and Earlsferry, Fife
- Fairmont St Andrews – Torrance Course and Kittocks Course, St Andrews, Fife
- Kingsbarns Golf Links, St Andrews, Fife
- Leven Links Golf Course, Leven, Fife
- Lundin Golf Club, Lundin Links, Fife
- St Andrews Links – Old, New, Castle, Jubilee, Eden, Strathtyrum, and Balgrove Courses, St Andrews, Fife
- Scotscraig Golf Club, Tayport, Fife

Angus

- Arbroath Golf Links, Arbroath, Angus
- Carnoustie Golf Links – Championship, Burnside, and Buddon Courses, Carnoustie, Angus
- Monifieth Golf Links – Medal Course and Ashludie Course, Monifieth, Angus
- Panmure Golf Club, Barry, Angus
- Montrose Golf Links – Medal Course and Broomfield Course, Montrose, Angus

North East

- Cruden Bay Golf Club – Championship Course and St Olaf Course, Cruden Bay, Aberdeenshire
- Fraserburgh Golf Club – Corbiehill Links and Rosehill Links, Fraserburgh, Aberdeenshire
- Inverallochy Golf Club, Inverallochy, Aberdeenshire
- Kings Links Golf Course, Aberdeen
- Murcar Links Golf Club – Murcar Course, Aberdeen
- Murcar Links Golf Club – Strabathie Course and Strabathie Course, Aberdeen
- Newburgh On Ythan Golf Club, Ellon, Aberdeenshire
- Peterhead Golf Club – Old Course and New Course, Peterhead, Aberdeenshire
- Royal Aberdeen Golf Club – Balgownie Links and Silverburn Links, Aberdeen

Moray Coast

- Buckpool Golf Club, Buckie, Banffshire
- Cullen Links Golf Club, The Royal Burgh of Cullen, Moray
- Hopeman Golf Club, Hopeman, Moray
- Moray Golf Club – Old Course and New Course, Lossiemouth, Moray
- Nairn Golf Club – Championship Course and Cameron Course, Nairn
- Nairn Dunbar Golf Club, Nairn
- Spey Bay Golf Club, Moray, Aberdeenshire
- Strathlene Golf Course, Buckie, Banffshire

Highlands and Islands

- Barra Golf Club, Castlebay, Isle of Barra, Outer Hebrides
- Brora Golf Club, Brora, Sutherland
- Castle Stuart Golf Club, Inverness, Invernessshire
- Durness Golf Club, Durness, Sutherland
- Fortrose and Rosemarkie Golf Club, Fortrose, Ross-shire
- Gairloch Golf Club, Gairloch, Ross-shire
- Golspie Golf Club, Golspie, Sutherland
- Harris Golf Club, Isle of Harris, Outer Hebrides
- Isle of Skye Golf Club, Sconser, Isle of Skye
- Reay Golf Club, Reay, Caithness
- Royal Dornoch Golf Club – Championship and Struie Course, Dornoch, Sutherland
- Skibo Castle – Carnegie Club, Dornoch, Sutherland
- Tain Golf Club, Tain, Ross-shire
- Tarbat Golf Club, Portmahomack, Ross-shire
- Traigh Golf Club, Arisaig, Invernessshire
- Whalsay Golf Club, Whalsay, Shetland Islands
- Wick Golf Club, Wick, Caithness

== England ==
North West

- Blackpool North Shore Golf Club, Blackpool, Lancashire
- Castletown Golf Links, Castletown, Isle of Man
- Fairhaven Golf Club, Lytham St Annes, Lancashire
- Fleetwood Golf Club, Fleetwood, Lancashire
- Formby Golf Club, Formby, Merseyside
- Furness Golf Club, Barrow in Furness, Cumbria
- Hesketh Golf Club, Southport, Merseyside
- Hillside Golf Club, Southport, Merseyside
- Leasowe Golf Club, Moreton, Wirral
- Royal Birkdale Golf Club, Southport, Merseyside
- Royal Liverpool Golf Club, Hoylake, Merseyside
- Royal Lytham & St Annes Golf Club, Lytham St Annes, Lancashire
- Seascale Golf Club, Seascale, Cumbria
- Silloth on Solway Golf Club, Silloth on Solway, Cumbria
- Southport and Ainsdale Golf Club, Southport, Merseyside
- Southport Municipal Golf Links, Southport, Merseyside
- St Annes Old Links Golf Club, St Annes-on-Sea, Lancashire
- Wallasey Golf Club, Wallasey, Merseyside,
- West Lancashire Golf Club, Liverpool, Merseyside

North East

- Berwick-upon-Tweed Golf Club Goswick Course, Berwick-upon-Tweed, Northumberland
- Cleveland Golf Club, Redcar, North Yorkshire
- Ganton Golf Club, Ganton, North Yorkshire
- Hartlepool Golf Club, Hartlepool, County Durham
- Newbiggin Golf Club, Newbiggin-by-the-Sea, Northumberland
- Seahouses Golf Club, Seahouses, Northumberland
- Seaton Carew Golf Club, Hartlepool, County Durham

South West

- Bude and North Cornwall Golf Club, Bude, Cornwall
- Burnham & Berrow Golf Club – Championship Course and Channel Course, Burnham-on-Sea, Somerset
- Minehead & West Somerset Golf Club, Minehead, Somerset
- Mullion Golf Club, Helston, Cornwall
- Newquay Golf Club, Newquay, Cornwall
- Perranporth Golf Club, Perranporth, Cornwall
- Royal North Devon Golf Club, Westward Ho!, Devon
- St. Enodoc Golf Club – Church Course, Rock, Cornwall
- Saunton Golf Club – East and West Courses, Braunton, Devon
- Thurlestone Golf Club, Kingsbridge, Devon
- Trevose Golf and Country Club – Championship Course, Trevose, Cornwall
- Warren Golf Club, Dawlish, South Devon
- West Cornwall Golf Club, Lelant, Cornwall
- Weston-super-Mare Golf Club, Weston-super-Mare, Somerset

South East

- Hayling Golf Club, Hayling Island, Hampshire
- Littlehampton Golf Club, Littlehampton, West Sussex
- Littlestone Golf Club – Warren and Championship Courses, Littlestone, Kent
- Prince's Golf Club, Sandwich, Kent
- Royal Cinque Ports Golf Club, Sandwich, Kent
- Royal St George's Golf Club, Sandwich, Kent
- Rye Golf Club (UK) – Old Course and Jubilee Course, Rye, East Sussex

East Anglia

- Felixstowe Ferry Golf Club – Martello Course and Kingsfleet Course, Felixstowe, Suffolk
- Frinton Golf Club – Havers Course and Kirby Course, Frinton, Essex
- Great Yarmouth & Caister Golf Club, Caister-on-Sea, Norfolk
- Hunstanton Golf Club, Hunstanton, Norfolk
- Royal Cromer Golf Club, Cromer, Norfolk
- Royal West Norfolk Golf Club, Brancaster, Norfolk
- Sheringham Golf Club, Sheringham, Norfolk

Midlands

- Sandilands Golf Club, Sutton on Sea, Lincolnshire (closed 2018)
- Seacroft Golf Club, Skegness, Lincolnshire

== Wales ==
- Abersoch Golf Club, Abersoch, Gwynedd
- Aberdovey Golf Club, Aberdyfi, Gwynedd
- Ashburnham Golf Club, Burry Port, Carmarthenshire
- Borth and Ynyslas Golf Club, Borth, Ceredigion
- Conwy Golf Club, Conwy
- Royal St David's Golf Club, Harlech, Gwynedd
- Machynys Peninsula Golf Club, Machynys, Carmarthenshire
- Nefyn and District Golf Club, Morfa Nefyn, Gwynedd
- North Wales Golf Club, Llandudno
- Porthmadog Golf Club, Porthmadog, Gwynedd
- Prestatyn Golf Club, Prestatyn, Denbighshire
- Pwllheli Golf Club, Pwllheli, Gwynedd
- Pennard Golf Club, Southgate, Swansea
- Pyle and Kenfig Golf Club, Kenfig, Mid Glamorgan
- Rhyl Golf Club (9), Rhyl, Denbighshire
- Royal Porthcawl Golf Club, Porthcawl, Mid Glamorgan
- Southerndown Golf Club, Ogmore-by-Sea, Mid Glamorgan
- Swansea Bay Golf Club, Neath, West Glamorgan
- Tenby Golf Club, Tenby, Pembrokeshire

== Northern Ireland & Channel Islands ==
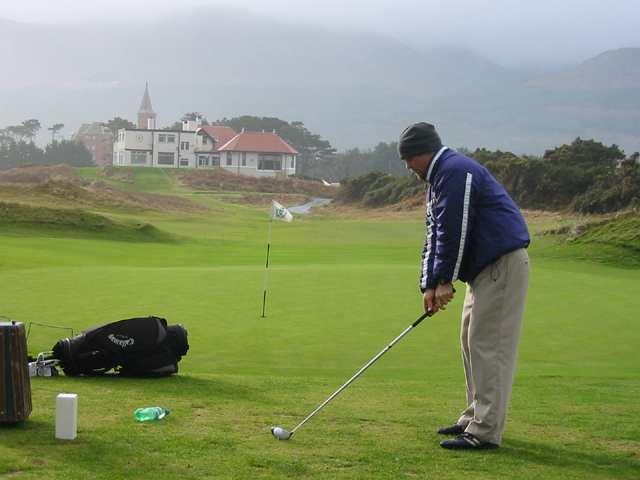
Royal County Down

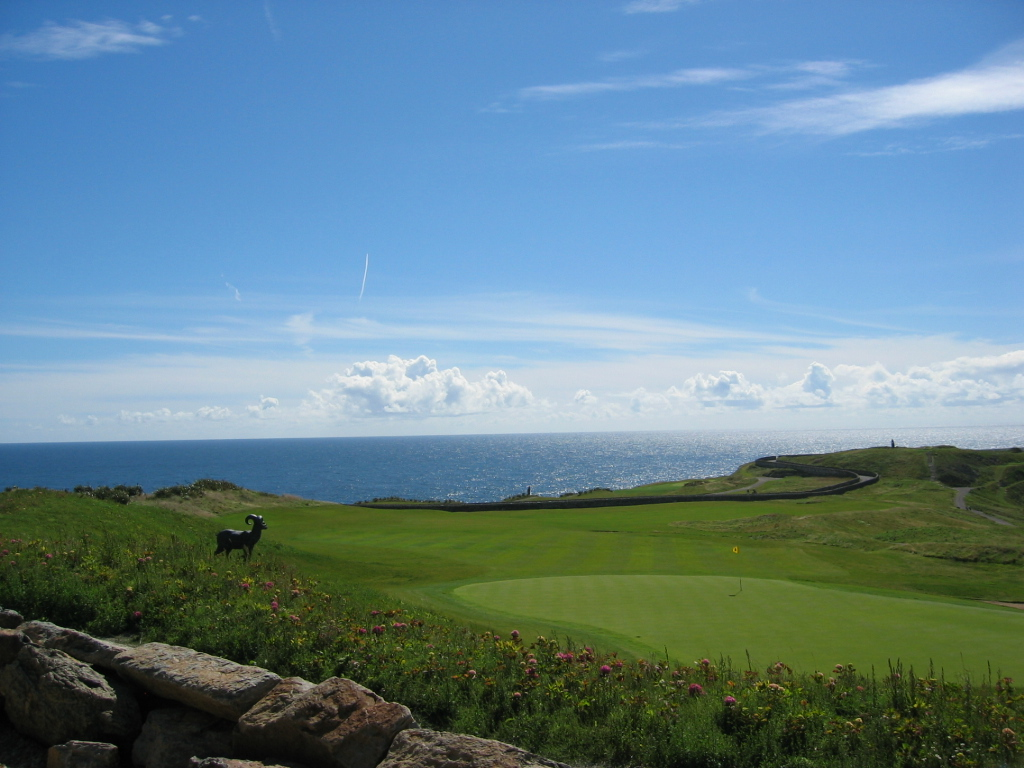
The 18th hole at the Old Head Golf Links on the Old Head of Kinsale

Channel Islands

- La Moye Golf Club, La Moye, Jersey
- Royal Guernsey Golf Club, Guernsey
- Royal Jersey Golf Club, Jersey

Northern Ireland

- Ardglass Golf Club – Ardglass, County Down
- Bushfoot Golf Club, Portballintrae, County Antrim
- Castlerock Golf Club – Mussenden Course and Bann Course, Castlerock, County Londonderry
- Kirkistown Castle Golf Club, Cloughey, County Down
- Portstewart Golf Club – Strand Course, Old Course, and Riverside Courses, Portstewart, County Londonderry
- Royal County Down Golf Club – Championship Course and Annesley Course, Newcastle, County Down
- Royal Portrush Golf Club – Dunluce Course and Valley Course, Portrush, County Antrim

== Ireland ==
South East

- Arklow Golf Club, Arklow, Co Wicklow
- Corballis Links Pitch and Putt Club, Donabate, Co Dublin
- The European Club, Arklow, Co Wicklow
- The Island Golf Club, Donabate, Co Dublin
- Portmarnock Golf Club – Championship Course and Yellow Course, Portmarnock, Co Dublin
- Portmarnock Hotel and Golf Links, Portmarnock, Co Dublin
- Rosslare Golf Club – Championship Course and Burrow Course, Rosslare, Co Wexford
- The Royal Dublin Golf Club, Bull Island, Co Dublin
- Rush Golf Club, Rush, Co Dublin
- St Anne's Golf Club, Bull Island, Co Dublin
- Sutton Golf Club, Sutton, Co Dublin

North East

- County Louth (Baltray) Golf Club, Drogheda, County Louth
- Laytown & Bettystown Golf Club, Bettystown, Co Meath
- Seapoint Golf Club, Drogheda, Co Louth

Munster

- Ballybunion Golf Club – Old Course and Cashen Course, Ballybunion, Co Kerry
- Castlegregory Golf and Fishing Club, Castlegregory, Co Kerry
- Dingle Golf Links, Dingle, Co Kerry
- Dooks Golf Club, Glenbeigh, Co Kerry
- Lahinch Golf Club – Old Course, Lahinch, Co Clare
- Lahinch Golf Club – Castle Course, Lahinch, Co Clare
- Old Head of Kinsale, Kinsale, Co Cork
- Tralee Golf Club, Tralee, Co Kerry
- Trump International Golf Links and Hotel Ireland, Doonbeg, Co Clare
- Waterville Golf Club, Waterville, Co Kerry

Connacht

- Achill Island Golf Club, Keel, Co Mayo
- Carne Golf Club – Hackett Course and Kilmore Course, Belmullet, Co Mayo
- Connemara Golf Links – Championship (A & B Nine) Course C Nine, Ballyconneely, Co Galway
- County Sligo Golf Club – Championship Course, Sligo, Co Sligo
- County Sligo Golf Club – Bomore Course (9), Sligo, Co Sligo
- Enniscrone Golf Club – Dunes Course and Scurmore Course, Enniscrone, Co Sligo
- Mulranny Golf Club, Mulranny, Co Mayo
- Strandhill Golf Club, Strandhill, Co Sligo

Donegal

- Ballyliffin Golf Club – Glashedy Course and Old Course, Ballyliffin, Co Donegal
- Buncrana Golf Club, Buncrana, Co Donegal
- Bundoran Golf Club, Bundoran, Co Donegal
- Cruit Island Golf Club, Cruit Island, Co Donegal
- Donegal Golf Club, Donegal, Co Donegal
- Dunfanaghy Golf Club, Dunfanaghy, Co Donegal
- Gweedore Golf Club, Derrybeg, Co Donegal
- Narin and Portnoo Golf Club, Narin, County Donegal
- North West Golf Club, Buncrana, Co Donegal
- Portsalon Golf Club, Portsalon, Co Donegal
- Rosapenna Golf Club – Sandy Hills Links, Old Tom Morris Links, St Patrick's Links, Carrigart, and Coastguard Nine, Downings, Co Donegal

== Rest of Europe ==
Belgium

- Royal Ostend Golf Club, De Haan, West-Vlaanderen

Denmark

- Fanø Golf Links, Fanø, Jutland

Estonia

- Pärnu Bay Golf Links, Pärnu

Finland

- Tapiola Golf, Espoo, Nyland

France

- Dinard Golf, Saint-Briac-sur-Mer, Bretagne
- Granville Golf Club, Bréville-sur-Mer, Basse-Normandie

Germany

- Golf Club Budersand, Sylt, Nordfriesland
- Golf Club Föhr, Nieblum, Nordfriesland
- Golf Club Nordeney, Nordeney, Ostfriesische Inseln
- Nordsee Golf Club, Sankt Peter-Ording, Nordfriesland

Italy

- Verdura East Links, Ribera, Sicily
- Albarella Golf Links, Rosolina, Veneto

Netherlands

- Domburgsche Golf Club, Domburg, Zeeland
- Kennemer Golf Club, Zandvoort, North Holland
- Noordwijkse Golf Club, Noordwijk, South Holland
- Royal Haagsche Golf & Country Club, Wassenaar, South Holland
- Zandvoortse Golf Club Sonderland, Zandvoort, North Holland

Norway

- Lofoten Golf Links, Gimsøy, Lofoten

Portugal

- West Cliffs Golf Links, Obidos
- Oitavos Dunes, Cascais, Lisbon

Sweden

- Falsterbo Golf Club, Falsterbo, Skåne
- Flommen Golf Club, Falsterbo, Skåne
- Grönhogen Golf Links & Country Club, Degerhamn, Öland
- Helsingborg Golf Club, Viken, Skåne
- Ljunghusen Golf Club, Höllviken, Skåne
- Sand Golf Club

Spain

- La Hacienda Links Golf Resort, Sotogrande, Cádiz

== United States ==
Midwest and Rocky Mountains

- Kingsley Club, Traverse City, Michigan
- Sand Hills Golf Club, Mullen, Nebraska
- Wawashkamo Golf Club, Mackinac Island, Michigan
- Whistling Straits – Irish Course and Straits Course, Haven, Wisconsin
- Tanners Brook Golf Club - Forest Lake, Minnesota

Northeast

- Highland Links, Truro, Massachusetts
- Maidstone Club, East Hampton, New York
- Rye Golf Club, Rye, New York
- Sankaty Head Golf Club, Siasconset, Massachusetts
- Shinnecock Hills Golf Club, Shinnecock Hills, New York

Pacific

- Bandon Dunes Golf Resort – Bandon Dunes, Bandon Trails, Old Macdonald, Pacific Dunes, and Sheep Ranch Courses, Bandon, Oregon
- Chambers Bay, University Place, Washington
- Cypress Point Club, Pebble Beach, California
- Gearhart Golf Links, Gearhart, Oregon
- Pebble Beach Golf Links, Pebble Beach, California
- Spyglass Hill Golf Course, Pebble Beach, California

South

- Kiawah Island Golf Resort - Ocean Course, Kiawah Island, South Carolina
- Streamsong Resort (Red, Blue, and Black courses), Streamsong, Florida

== Canada ==
- Cabot Links, Inverness, Nova Scotia
- Harmon Links, Stephenville, Newfoundland
- The Links at Crowbush Cove, Morell, Prince Edward Island

== Australia ==
New South Wales

- Belmont Golf Course, Belmont
- Long Reef Golf Club, Collaroy
- New South Wales Golf Club, Sydney
- The Lakes Golf Club, Sydney

Northern Territory

- Gardens Park Golf Links
- Tennant Creek Golf Club

Queensland

- Boyne Island Tannum Sands Golf Course
- Hope Island Resort Golf Course
- St Lucia Golf Links

Victoria

- Barwon Heads Golf Club, Barwon Heads
- Cheltenham Golf Club, Cheltenham
- Commonwealth Golf Club, Oakleigh South, Melbourne
- Curlewis Golf Club, Curlewis
- Eagle Ridge Golf Course, Boneo
- Flinders Golf Club, Flinders
- Huntingdale Golf Club, Oakleigh South, Melbourne
- Kingston Heath, Cheltenham, Melbourne
- Lonsdale Links, Point Lonsdale
- Metropolitan Golf Club, Oakleigh South, Melbourne
- Moonah Links – Open Course and Legends Course, Fingal
- Mornington Golf Club, Mornington
- Peterborough Golf Club, Peterborough
- Portarlington Golf Club, Portarlington
- Port Fairy Golf Club, Port Fairy
- Portsea Golf Club, Portsea
- Queenscliff Golf Club, Swan Island
- RACV Cape Schanck, Cape Schanck
- RACV Torquay Resort, Torquay
- Royal Melbourne Golf Club, Black Rock, Melbourne
- Sanctuary Lakes Golf Club, Point Cook, Melbourne
- Sandringham Golf Links, Sandringham, Melbourne
- Sandy Golf Links, Cheltenham, Melbourne
- Sorrento Golf Club, Sorrento
- Southern Golf Club, Keysborough, Melbourne
- Spring Valley Golf Club, Clayton South, Melbourne
- St Andrews Beach, Fingal
- The Dunes Golf Links, Rye
- The National Golf Club - Old Course, Moonah Course, Gunnamatta Course and Long Island Course, Cape Schanck
- The Sands Torquay, Torquay
- Thirteenth Beach Golf Links - Beach Course and Creek Course, Connewarre
- Victoria Golf Club, Cheltenham, Melbourne
- Woodlands Golf Club, Mordialloc, Melbourne
- Yarra Yarra Golf Club, Bentleigh East, Melbourne

Western Australia

- The Cut Golf Course, Dawesville
- The Links Kennedy Bay, Port Kennedy
- Sea View Golf Club, Cottesloe

South Australia

- Nullarbor Links
- Royal Adelaide Golf Club, Seaton, Adelaide

Tasmania

- Barnbougle Dunes, Bridport
- Barnbougle Lost Farm, Bridport
- Bougle Run, Bridport
- Cape Wickham Links
- Ratho Farm Golf Links

== New Zealand ==
South Island

- Chisholm Park Golf Club, Tainui, Dunedin
- Hokitika Golf Club, Hokitika, West Coast
- Karamea Golf Club, Karamea, West Coast
- Nelson Golf Links, Nelson
- Otakou Golf Club, Otakou, Otago Peninsula
- Takaka Golf Club, Clifton, Tasman
- Westport Golf Club, Westport, West Coast

North Island

- Paraparaumu Beach Golf Club, Paraparaumu

== South Africa ==
- Atlantic Beach Links, Melkbosstrand, Western Cape
- Humewood Golf Course, Port Elizabeth, Eastern Cape
- Milnerton Golf Club, Milnerton, Western Cape
