= Cape Wickham =

Most northerly point of King Island, Tasmania, Australia

- Cape
- Coordinates: 39°34′48″S 143°56′24″E
- Location: King Island, Tasmania, Australia

Cape Wickham is the most northerly point of King Island, Tasmania, Australia. From here, it is 90 kilometres (56 mi) to Cape Otway on the Australian mainland. In the 19th century, ships coming from Europe would sometimes attempt to sail between Cape Wickham and Cape Otway to cut down on travelling time to Sydney, however the trip was dangerous and the price of failure high – usually shipwreck on the unforgiving King Island coast.

The Cape Wickham lighthouse situated on the cape had its 150th anniversary in 2011. The lighthouse was constructed in the 1860s when the island was still known as King's Island.

On 30 October 2015, Cape Wickham Links, an 18-hole golf course, opened to the public.
