= Porthdinllaen =

Coordinates: 52.942°N 4.568°W

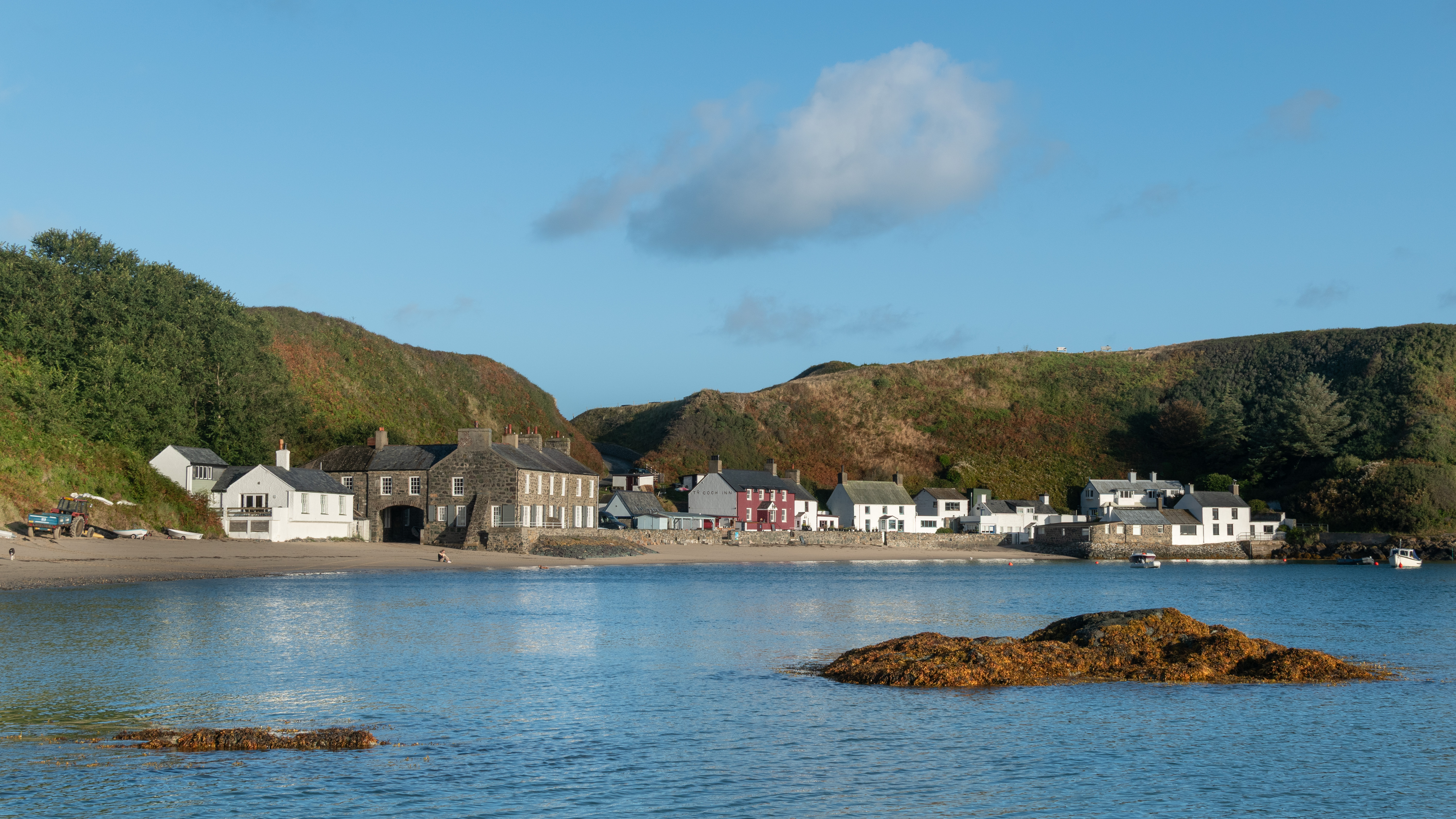
- Porthdinllaen seen from across the bay

- Location within Gwynedd
- Population: 2
- OS grid reference: SH276416
- Community: Nefyn
- Principal area: Gwynedd
- Preserved county: Gwynedd
- Country: Wales
- Sovereign state: United Kingdom
- Post town: Pwllheli
- Postcode district: LL53
- Dialling code: 01758
- Police: North Wales
- Fire: North Wales
- Ambulance: Welsh
- UK Parliament: Dwyfor Meirionnydd
- Senedd Cymru – Welsh Parliament: Dwyfor Meirionnydd

Porthdinllaen (sometimes Porth Dinllaen in English) is a small coastal village on the Llŷn Peninsula in the Dwyfor area of Gwynedd, Wales, built on a small promontory, and historically in Caernarfonshire. It is near the larger village of Morfa Nefyn.

It has been owned by the National Trust since 1994. With views across to Yr Eifl and Snowdonia, Porthdinllaen, with Nefyn and Morfa Nefyn, forms a 2-mile (3.2 km) bay. There are only about two dozen buildings at Porthdinllaen, with the Tŷ Coch Inn at the centre of the village.

Vehicular access to the village is restricted to residents with a car permit; visitors must walk across the beach from Morfa Nefyn or across the Nefyn & District Golf Club golf course on top of the headland, past the Iron Age hill fort.

== Port ==
Porthdinllaen was originally a fishing port, based around a natural harbour at the west end of a bay over a mile and a quarter (2 km) across, and with over one hundred acres (40 hectares) of safe anchorage. The harbour is sheltered by a headland jutting out to the north from all but a north-easterly wind, and as the only such haven on the Llŷn Peninsula, it has been used for many centuries of trading, and as a place to run to for shelter in a storm.

Porthdinlleyn Harbour Act 1806
- Act of Parliament
- Parliament of the United Kingdom
- Long title: An Act for erecting a pier and other works, for the improvement of the harbour of Porthdinlleyn, in Carnarvon Bay, in the county of Carnarvon.
- Citation: 46 Geo. 3. c. xxxiv

Dates
- Royal assent: 23 May 1806

Text of statute as originally enacted

In May 1806, an act of Parliament, the Porthdinlleyn Harbour Act 1806 (46 Geo. 3. c. xxxiv), approved new buildings when it seemed that Porthdinllaen would be chosen as the port on the route to Ireland, rather than Holyhead, Anglesey. Porthdinllaen was almost as far west as Holyhead, but Holyhead was more accessible, because of Thomas Telford's road developments. Porthdinllaen Harbour Company was formed in 1808 in preparation, by the Jones Parry family of the Madryn estate (the company's assets included the village and the harbour), but the bill before Parliament to constitute Porthdinllaen as a harbour for Irish trade was rejected in 1810.

Pig farming was important to the economy of the Llŷn Peninsula, and Porthdinllaen was the main point of export to Liverpool. In 1830, the farmers and merchants asked the Madryn estate to build a bigger pier, but the estate refused. The first steamer, the Vale of Clwyd, did not therefore enter service until 1832. Apart from goods intended for the local population and the farmers, Porthdinllaen imported large quantities of salt to create the Nefyn herring.

== Shipbuilding ==
At first mostly small sloops were built in Porthdinllaen but in response to the demand for bigger ships schooners and the occasional brigantine were built there, such as in 1786 the 95-ton brigantine Maria and in 1866 the 287-ton barque Robert Jones. In 1876 the 149-ton brigantine Annie Lloyd was the last vessel built there.

== Railway proposals ==
After the failure of the proposal to create a point of embarkation to Ireland, various proposals were made to build railways to serve the harbour at Porthdinllaen. However, none was eventually constructed:

- 1830 – Samuel Holland, a slate quarry owner at Rhiw, joined Henry Archer, a businessman from Dublin, to promote the Ffestiniog Railway, incorporated by the Festiniog Railway Act 1832 (2 & 3 Will. 4. c. xlviii) on 23 May 1832
- 1845 – The Worcester and Porth-Dynllaen Railway informed the Rev. T. Parry Jones Parry of an application to Parliament of a railway track from Worcester to Porthdinllaen
- 1845 – The North Wales Railway Co. planned to construct 28 miles (45 km) of track from Bangor to Porthdinllaen
- 1860 – The Aberystwith and Welsh Coast Railway Company wanted to construct a line from Aberystwyth to Porthdinllaen. The line to Pwllheli was completed c.1876 but the final five miles were not built.
- 1877 – The Cambrian Railways Act 1877 (40 & 41 Vict. c. ccxxxviii) revived the powers conferred by the Aberystwith and Welsh Coast Railway Act 1862 (25 & 26 Vict. c. clxxvi) for the final 5 miles from Pwllheli

== Lifeboat station ==
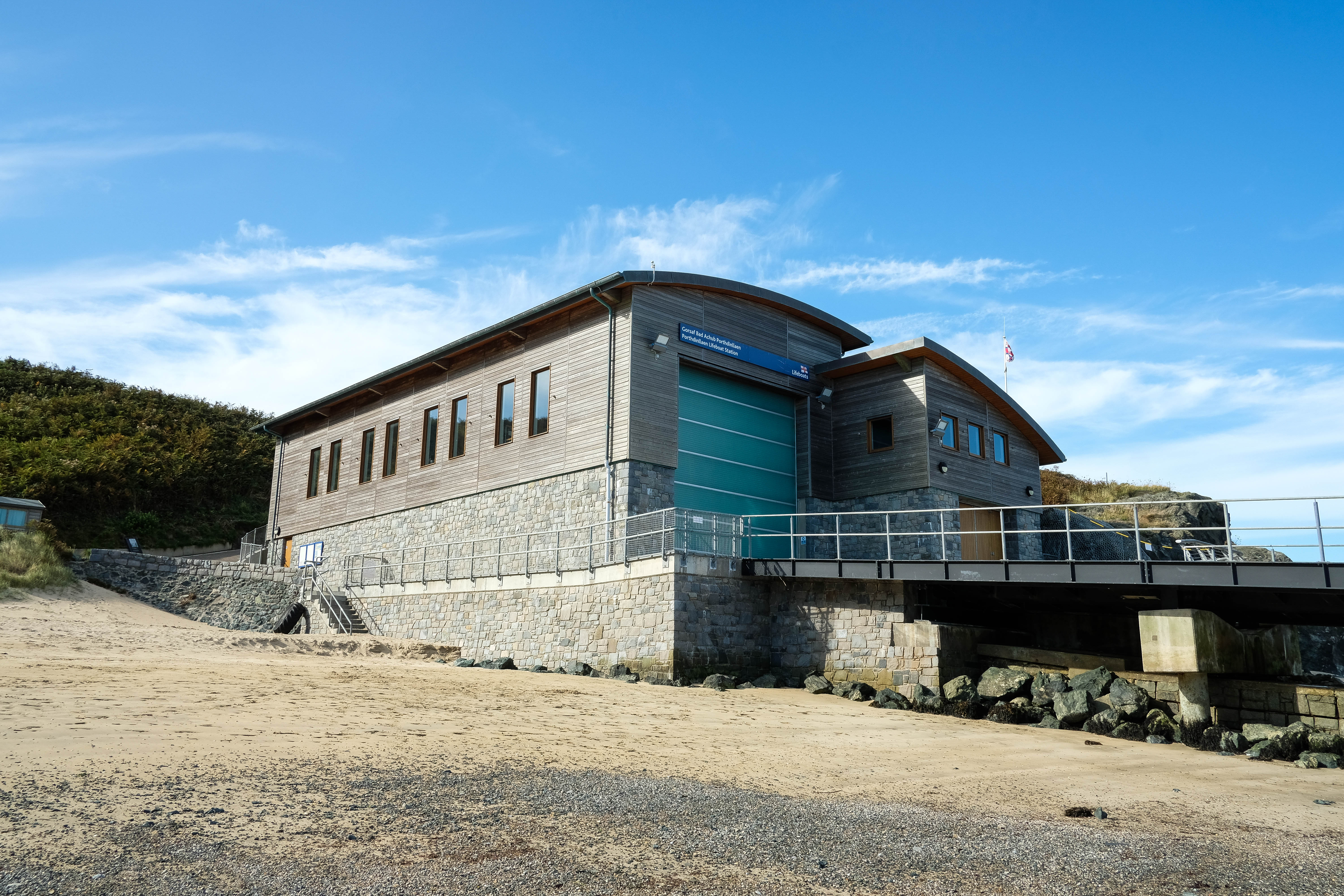
Porthdinllaen lifeboat station

In the 19th century, north Wales lacked good roads, so the sea was the easiest way to access many places. Porthdinllaen, on the northern coast of the Llŷn peninsula, with its sheltered north-facing bay, became important as a harbour of refuge and a busy port, with over 700 ships passing through the port in 1861. After storms in 1863, the local parish priest wrote to the Royal National Lifeboat Institution to request that a lifeboat be positioned in the harbour.

The boatshed and slip were commissioned in 1864. Both have been constantly staffed since commissioning; the current coxswain is Mike Davies, who has served as coxswain since 2004.

The Tyne class lifeboat Hetty Rampton, in service since 27 April 1987, was replaced by a new Tamar class lifeboat, John D Spicer, in 2012.

== Film location ==
Because of its highly preserved and yet maintained status, Porthdinllaen regularly acts as a film and television shooting location. In September 2004 it posed as a Scottish fishing village for the Demi Moore romantic thriller Half Light.
