= Llanwern Golf Club =

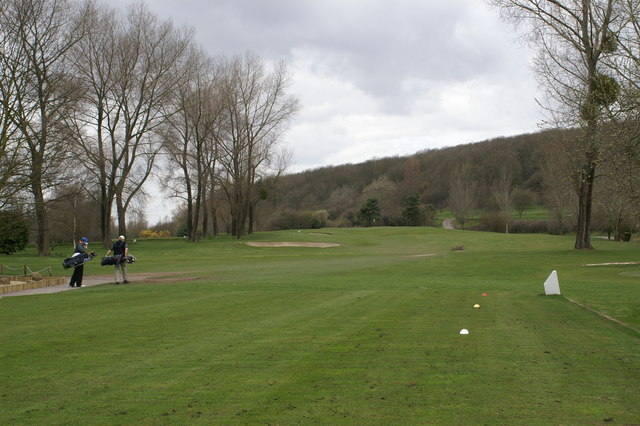

- Llanwern Golf Club within Wales
- 51.58787°N 2.922453°W

Club information
- Location: Newport, Wales
- Type: Golf Club
- Tota holes: 18
- Website: llanwerngolfclub.co.uk
- Par: 70
- Length: 6177 yards

Llanwern Golf Club (Welsh: Clwb Golff Llanwern) is a golf club based just outside Llanwern at Newport, Wales. It is an 18-hole parkland course and is reputedly one of the oldest in South Wales. In 2010, the club based PGA professional Leanne Cooper was named the Ladies European Tour-sponsored PGA female assistant of the year.

== See also ==
- Golf in Wales
