= Ffos Las =

Rural area of Carmarthenshire, Wales

Coordinates: 51.73112°N 4.23998°W

Ffos Las is a rural area between the villages of Carway and Trimsaran, north of the town of Llanelli in the Gwendraeth Valley in Carmarthenshire, Wales.

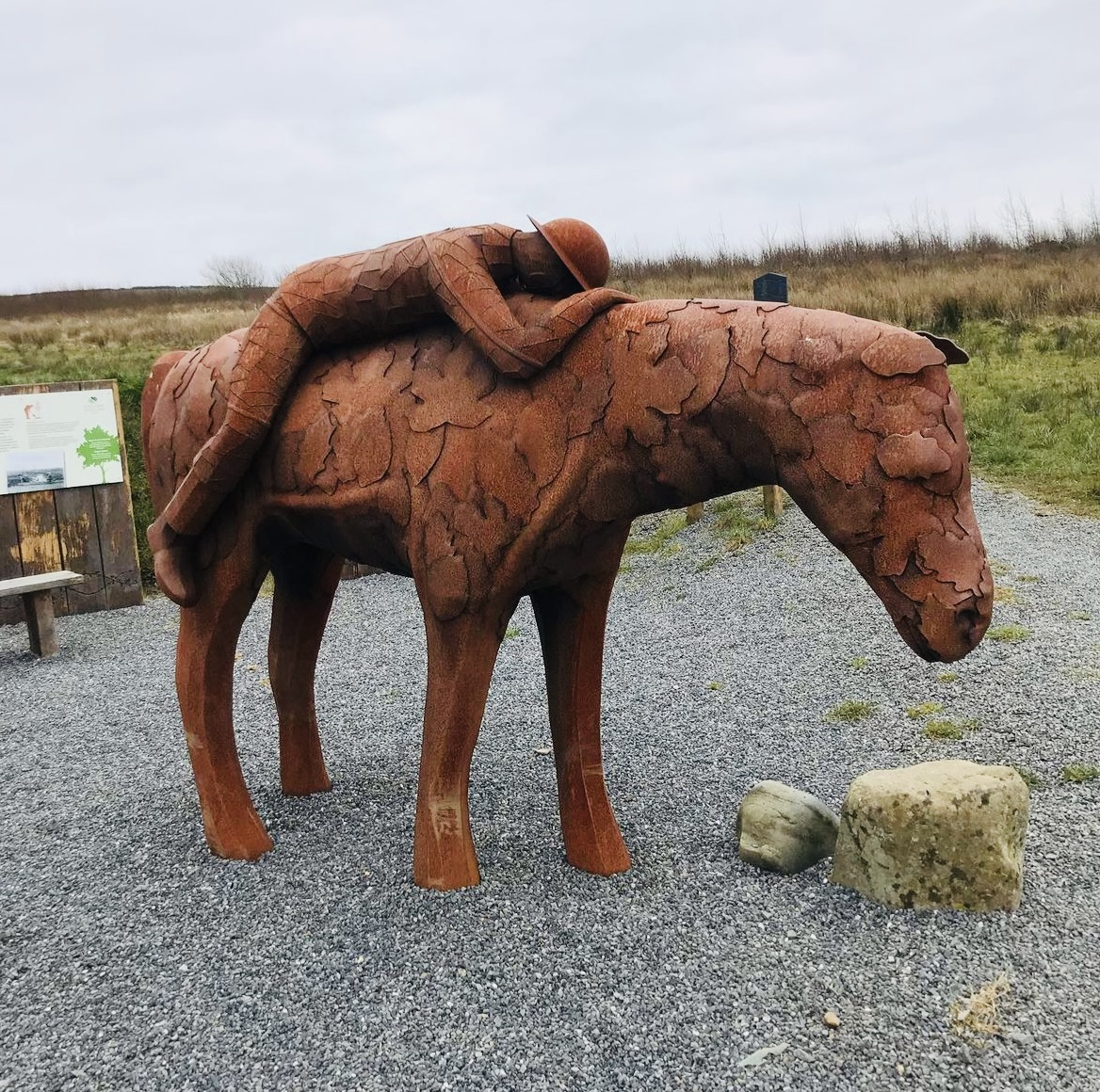
Statue of ‘Yr Arwr’, at Coed Ffos Las

The Ffos Las area is named after a farm which had existed at the site before mining operations began. The English translation of ffos las is blue trench. Ffos Las was once the site of an open cast mining operation which operated between 1983 and 1997. At one time, it was the largest open cast mine in Europe and was 500 ft deep.

Ffos Las is now best known for the Ffos Las racecourse which was completed in 2009 and is built on top of the in-filled open cast mine.

The racecourse hosts a variety of events that range from equestrian sports to live performances by musical artists, the most notable being popular indie band, Kaiser Chiefs.

The area is also renowned for the Coed Ffos Las, a young woodland planted on the slopes of the Gwendraeth Valley. The woodland was planted as a memorial to the lives lost during the First World War, and includes numerous information panels and sculptures commemorating this. One such example is ‘Yr Arwr’, a war horse sculpture.

Coed Ffos Las is free to use for the public and includes marshland, grassland and broadleaved woodland and acts as a haven for local wildlife such as ground-nesting birds, owls and foxes.

== Future plans ==
House builders Dandara are currently building approximately 141 houses as part of their "Golwg Gwendraeth" site, which is situated in a part of the racecourse development site.

As of May 2024, construction is still ongoing, however some homes have now been completed and are available to buy.
