= Barwon Heads Golf Club =

Golf course in Barwon Heads, Victoria

- Location within Victoria Location within Australia
- 38.27827°S 144.45692°E

Club information
- Location: Barwon Heads, Victoria, Australia
- Established: 1907
- Tota holes: 18
- Greens: Poa annua
- Fairways: Couch
- Website: www.barwonheads.golf/cms/

Championship course
- Designed by: Victor East (1921); Neil Crafter & Paul Mogford (2005)
- Par: 70 men, 73 ladies
- Length: 5,839 m (6,386 yd) men 5,312 m (5,809 yd) ladies

3-par course
- Designed by: Neil Crafter & Paul Mogford
- Par: 21
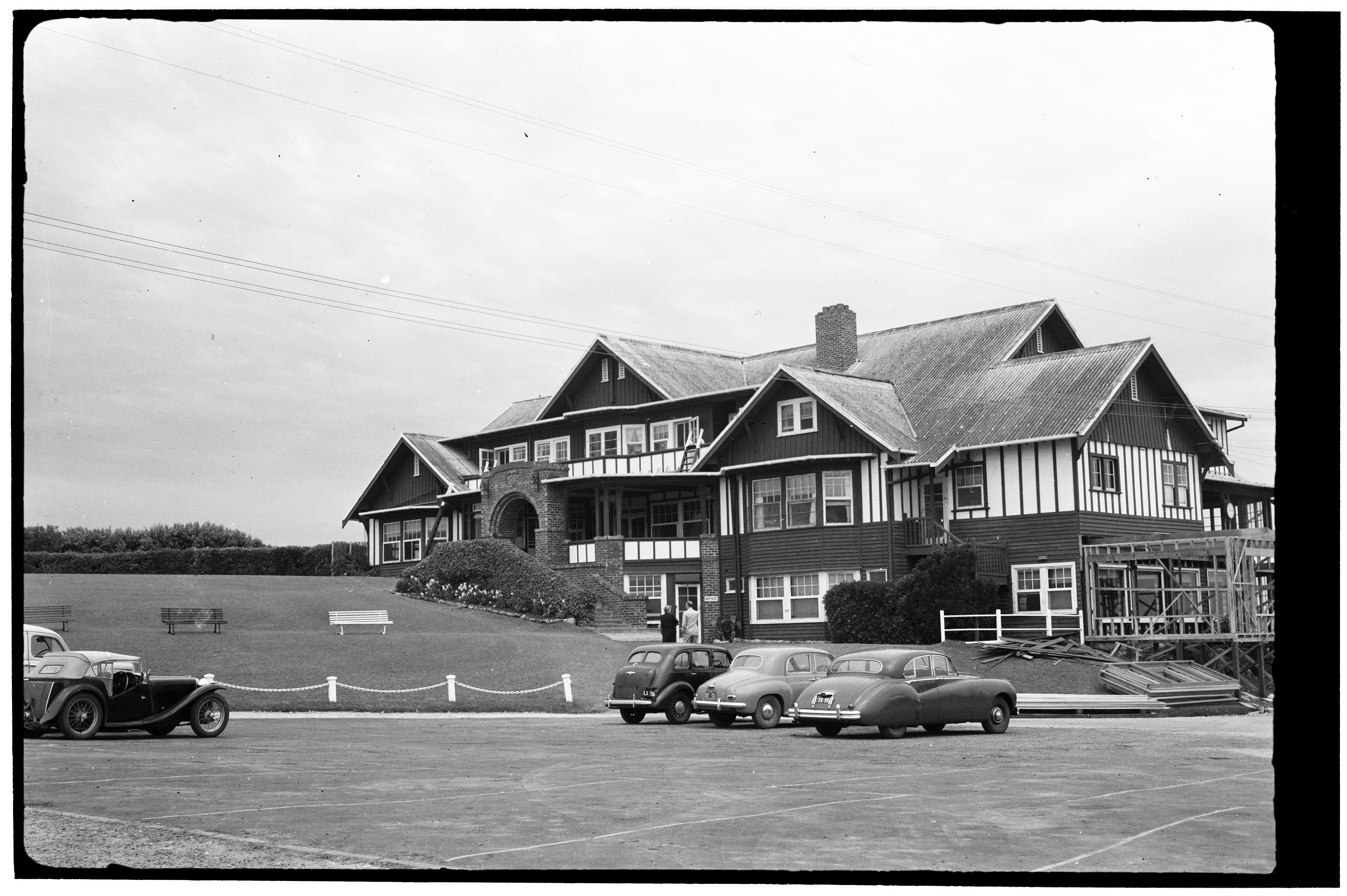
- Clubhouse, 1950s

The Barwon Heads Golf Club is a golf club located in Barwon Heads, Victoria. The club is located on the southern edge of the township of Barwon Heads and comprises an eighteen-hole links style championship course as well as a nine-hole 3-par course, tennis courts and a clubhouse with accommodation built in the 1920s.

== History ==
The Barwon Heads Golf Club was founded in 1907 and was initially a nine hole course located to the north of the township of Barwon Heads. In 1920 the club moved to its current location on the southern edge of the Barwon Heads township on the Bass Strait coast line. The links style course was designed by Victor East, the then professional of the Royal Melbourne Golf Club, the plowing and shaping of the course was done with horse drawn implements and the course was planted with couch grass obtained from the Royal Melbourne Golf Club.

The clubhouse was built in 1923-4 by John Smith of Meredith for £12,500 to the designs of the architectural firm Klingender & Hamilton, by 1925 the club has spent almost £20,000 on the clubhouse including furniture and plants. The clubhouse has subsequently undergone a number of renovations, it is listed on the Victorian Heritage Register.

In 1961 the club built a nine-hole 3-par course, it was laid out by Legh Winser.

From 2005 Neil Crafter and Paul Mogford of Crafter and Mogford Golf Strategists were engaged by the club to enhance the championship course. At the same time the 3-par course was demolished to make way for a flood detention basin to provide the club with an irrigation source, a new nine-hole 3-par course was designed by Crafter and Mogford.

== Championship course ==
The championship course is an eighteen-hole links style course located in the sand dunes near the ocean, the first six holes are to the east of the clubhouse and with the remaining twelve to the west. It has been ranked the 20th best golf course in Australia and one of the finest links courses.

Championship course
Hole	1	2	3	4	5	6	7	8	9	10	11	12	13	14	15	16	17	18
Mens par	4	3	4	3	5	4	4	3	4	4	4	4	3	5	4	5	3	4
Mens length	299 m	207 m	373 m	165 m	458 m	348 m	368 m	168 m	400 m	322 m	346 m	385 m	130 m	500 m	416 m	449 m	159 m	346 m
Ladies par	4	3	5	3	5	4	4	3	5	4	4	5	3	5	4	5	3	4
Ladies length	290 m	194 m	365 m	119 m	431 m	295 m	358 m	128 m	357 m	279 m	304 m	381 m	123 m	446 m	327 m	426 m	148 m	341 m

== See also ==
- List of links golf courses
