= Mold Golf Club =

Welsh golf club

- Mold Golf Club within Wales
- 53.1729°N 3.20536°W

Club information
- Location: Flintshire, Wales
- Established: 1905
- Type: Golf Club
- Total holes: 18
- Website: moldgolfclub.co.uk
- Par: 69
- Length: 5473 yards

Mold Golf Club (Welsh: Clwb Golff Yr Wyddgrug) is a golf club based just outside Pantymwyn in Flintshire, Wales. It is an 18-hole uplands course some 850 feet above sea level, with a practice ground and putting green. The Club welcomes members, new members and visitors alike, seven days a week. The club was praised by Welsh Assembly Delyn AM Sandy Mewies recently while opening a new facility at the club; she said, "It is a top flight facility, similar to ones used by top players". The club was opened as "Hafod Golf Links" in 1905.
