= Langland Bay Golf Club =

Golf club in Swansea, Wales

Coordinates: 51°34′02″N 4°01′56″W

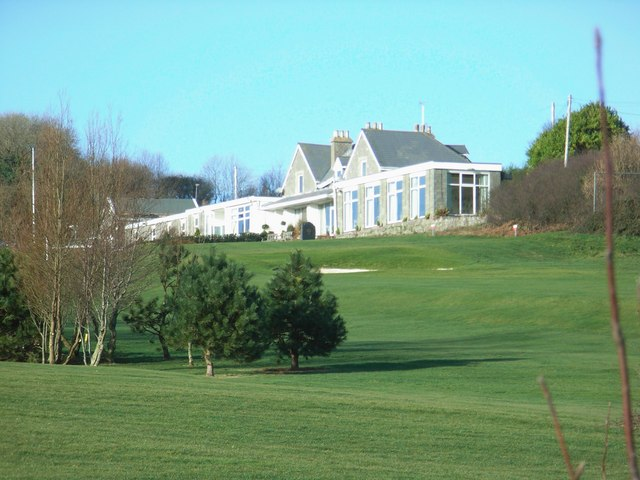
Langland Bay Golf Clubhouse

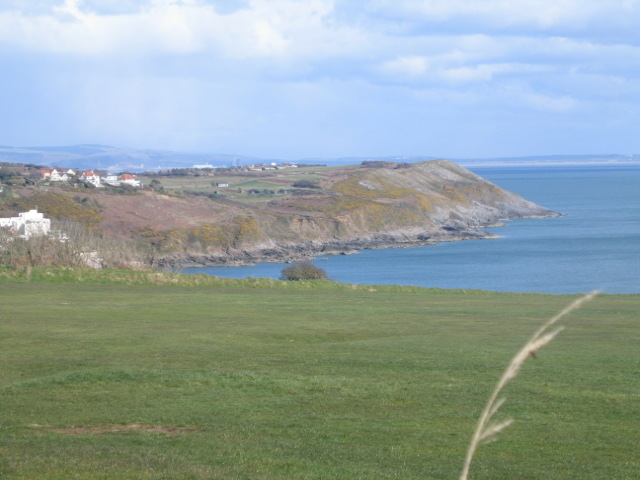
A view from the course

Langland Bay Golf Club is an 18-hole golf course known in an Area of Outstanding Natural Beauty overlooking Langland Bay near Swansea, Wales, UK.

The first evidence of a golf club at Langland Bay is a minute book dating from 1901. The golf course was officially opened on 10 September 1904. The centenary in 2004 was marked by special events and a visit from Prince Andrew, Duke of York.

The club's members claim Hole 6 is the most difficult in Wales, while Hole 16 is known as "Death Or Glory" with the sea on one side and a 100 feet steep drop on the other. The other holes typically have small greens and plenty of rough grass and sand traps. The sea can be easily seen from 15 of its 18 holes.

The club hosts the Gwalia PGA Pro-Am tournament each year, raising money for the Gwalia Housing Trust.
