= Pentre-gat =

Village in Ceredigion, Wales

Coordinates: 52.141418°N 4.406300°W

- Location within Ceredigion
- OS grid reference: SN 3543 5197
  - Cardiff: 69.6 mi (112.0 km)
  - London: 187.8 mi (302.2 km)
- Community: Llangrannog
- Principal area: Ceredigion
- Country: Wales
- Sovereign state: United Kingdom
- Post town: Llandysul
- Postcode district: SA44
- Police: Dyfed-Powys
- Fire: Mid and West Wales
- Ambulance: Welsh
- UK Parliament: Ceredigion Preseli
- Senedd Cymru – Welsh Parliament: Ceredigion Penfro

Pentre-gat (also spelled Pentregat) is a small village in the community of Llangrannog, Ceredigion, Wales, which is 69.6 miles (112 km) from Swansea and 187.8 miles (302.3 km) from London. Pentre-gat is represented in the Senedd by Elin Jones (Plaid Cymru) and is part of the Ceredigion Preseli constituency in the House of Commons.

The word derives from the Welsh language: "Village gate".

== See also ==
- List of localities in Wales by population
