= Storws Wen Golf Club =

Coordinates: 53.317°N 4.256°W

Storws Wen Golf Club is a golf course in Brynteg, Benllech, Wales, on the Isle of Anglesey.

It was built in 1996 by Ken and Eleri Jones. They were also the first Captains for the golf club. Storws Wen is a nine-hole golf course situated on Anglesey in Brynteg.
