= Carway =

Village in Carmarthenshire, Wales

Coordinates: 51.736°N 4.225°W

Carway: Welsh: Carwe
- Location within Carmarthenshire
- Community: Llangyndeyrn
- Principal area: Carmarthenshire
- Preserved county: Dyfed
- Country: Wales
- Sovereign state: United Kingdom
- Post town: KIDWELLY
- Postcode district: SA17
- Dialling code: 01269
- Police: Dyfed-Powys
- Fire: Mid and West Wales
- Ambulance: Welsh
- UK Parliament: Llanelli
- Senedd Cymru – Welsh Parliament: Carmarthen East and Dinefwr

Carway (Welsh: Carwe) is a village situated to the north-west of the town of Llanelli in the county of Carmarthenshire, Wales, in the Gwendraeth Valley. It is part of the community of Llangyndeyrn, and had a population of 1,403 in 2021.

Open-cast mining operations once operated to the north and south of the village. The northern area has been reclaimed and re-developed as the Glyn Abbey Golf Club. The former mining area south of the village at Ffos Las has been reclaimed and has been redeveloped with a new racecourse (opened on 18 June 2009) and housing.

== Glyn Abbey Golf Club ==
The Glyn Abbey Golf Club is an 18-hole golf course designed by Hawtree & Son Golf Architects and opened in 1992 on the southern slopes of the picturesque Gwendraeth Valley and was built by British Coal as part of its restoration plan. The course is a par 70 course which is some 6202 yards in length with greens covering an area of 490m². The club was named Welsh Golf Club of The Year 2009.
