= Caerphilly Golf Club =

Leisure facility in Wales

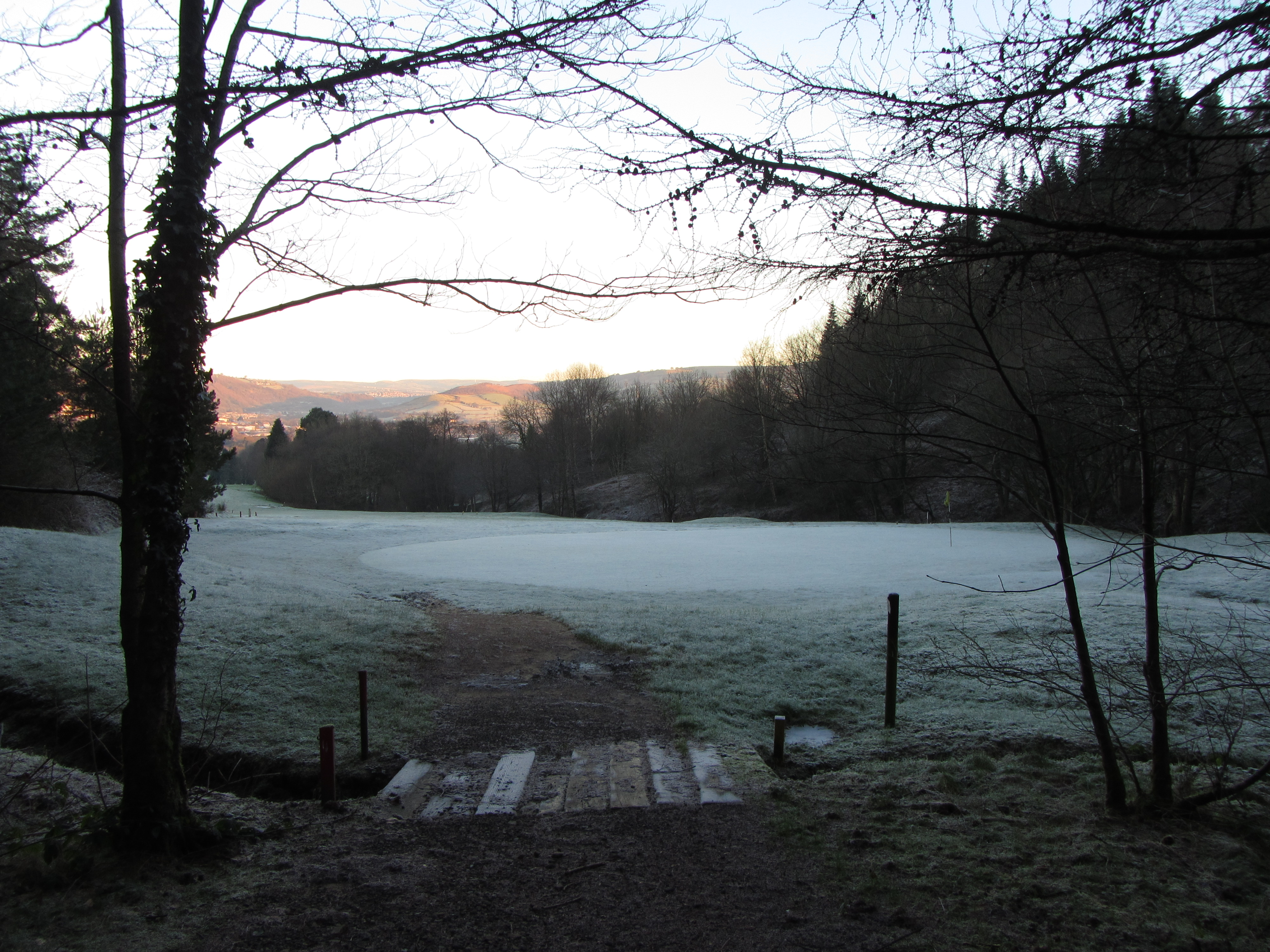

- Caerphilly Golf Club within Wales
- 51.57046°N 3.228611°W

Club information
- Location: Caerphilly County Borough, Wales
- Established: 1905
- Type: Golf Club
- Total holes: 18
- Website: caerphillygolfclub.com

Caerphilly Golf Club (Welsh: Clwb Golff Caerffili) is a golf club based just outside Caerphilly at Caerphilly County Borough, Wales. A 5944-yard-long, 18 hole Mountain course with par 71 and SSS of 70. The club was founded in 1905.
