= Holywell Golf Club =

Welsh golf club

- Location in Flintshire
- 53°15′53″N 3°14′23″W

Club information
- Location: Near Holywell, Flintshire, Wales
- Established: 1906
- Tota holes: 18

Holywell Golf Club (Welsh: Clwb Golff Treffynnon) is a golf club, situated a mile southwest of the town of Holywell, Flintshire, Wales. Instituted in 1906, it is an 18-hole moorland and parkland course and is approximately 800 feet above sea level. In 2001 the club nearly faced bankruptcy due to problems with Foot-and-mouth disease from roaming sheep.

== Ancient site ==
Two Bronze Age round barrows known as Clwt Militia (Militia Patch) are located on the course, about 0.65 miles (1 km) north-northwest of the church.
