= Rhos-on-Sea Golf Club =

Golf club in Conwy County Borough, Wales

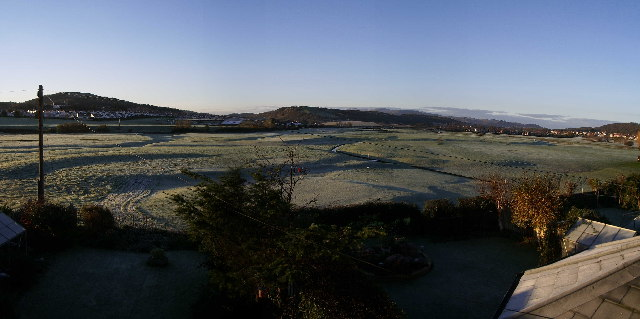

- Rhos-on-Sea Golf Club within Wales
- 53.31276°N 3.756421°W

Club information
- Location: Conwy County Borough, Wales
- Established: 1899
- Type: Golf Club
- Tota holes: 18
- Website: rhosgolf.co.uk
- Par: 69
- Length: 5965 yards

Rhos-on-Sea Golf Club (Welsh: Clwb Golff Llandrillo-yn-Rhos) is a golf club based just outside Rhos-on-Sea at Conwy County Borough, Wales. It is an 18-hole course on parkland. This club has a "Pay and Play" policy.

The course was redesigned in 1934 by Simpson & Co. Golf Architects Ltd, of Liphook.
