= Old Padeswood Golf Club =

Welsh golf club

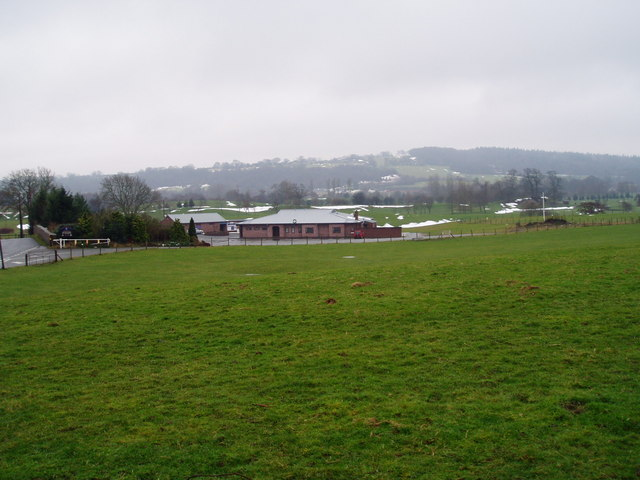

- Old Padeswood Golf Club within Wales
- 53.14677°N 3.085069°W

Club information
- Location: Flintshire, Wales
- Established: 1910s
- Type: Golf Club
- Tota holes: 18
- Par: 72
- Length: 6118 yards

Old Padeswood Golf Club (Welsh: Clwb Golff Old Padeswood) is a golf club based just outside Padeswood at Flintshire, Wales. It is an 18-hole parkland course. Golf was originally played at the current site of Old Padeswood Golf Club over 100 years ago as recorded in the 1912 OS map, but revamped in 1977 with 18 holes in 1985. It was officially opened in 1985 by former British Ryder Cup Captain and Welsh International Brian Huggett M.B.E. In June 2011, three club members scored 3 hole-in-ones on a single incredible weekend. Their "Pay and Play" course is available to non-members.
