= Alice Springs Golf Club =

Alice Springs Golf Club- Now Closed
- Alice Springs Golf Club within Wales
- 51.743326°N 2.945613°W

Club information
- Location: Monmouthshire, Wales
- Established: 1989
- Type: Golf Club
- Tota holes: 36
- Website: alicespringsgolfclub.co.uk (no longer in use)
- Par: 70
- Length: 5967 yards

Alice Springs Golf Club – Now Closed (Welsh: Clwb Golff Alice Springs) is a former golf club based just outside Usk in Monmouthshire, Wales. Alice Springs was a 36-hole golf complex with 40 Buggys, all fitted with GPS systems. It was an all-weather course with no temporary greens. The club's 2 courses were open to the public, as were the clubhouse facilities and restaurant which were also open to the general non playing public. Wales and Scarlets prop Iestyn Thomas amongst others had played at the club. It is now permanently closed.

As of 2011 there is also an Alice Springs Golf Club in central Australia.
