= Cape Wickham Links =

Golf course in Tasmania, Australia

Club information
- Type: public
- Total holes: 18
- Website: https://www.capewickham.com.au/

Cape Wickham Links is an 18-hole golf course that was constructed on the northern tip of King Island, 48 kilometres (30 mi) north of Currie, on Tasmania. It opened to the public on 30 October 2015. A par 72 course, it is 6,150 metres (6,726 yards) long. Critically acclaimed, it has been ranked third in the Australian Golf Digest Top 100 Courses rankings, and 24th in the world.

== History ==
Andrew Purchase bought the land in 2011. Extra land was required, which resulted in Victorian course owner Duncan Andrews investing in the project, and the Tasmanian Government making some public land available for lease. Golf course designer Mike De Vries designed the course, nine holes of which straddle the coastline. The windy climate necessitated the use of multiple types of fescue grasses for the greens. The course has cost $8 million to buy and construct. Covering around 120 hectares (300 acres), the course encroached on the nesting burrows of short-tailed shearwaters. Some of these were destroyed in the course's creation, however, the construction took place outside the breeding season while the birds were absent. The site owners reported that the birds dug new burrows in natural areas the next season, and that the course has prevented access to locals taking birds for food.

The course has been designed with wide fairways to accommodate for the strong westerly winds known as the Roaring Forties. Holes singled out for praise by Ausgolf reviewer Gary Kennedy include the par five 9th hole, complete with ravine, the par three 11th hole alongside a rocky cove, and the picturesque 18th hole. Some concerns have been raised over the loss of access to public land, as the beach locale Victoria Cove was incorporated into the 18th hole and blocked from public use.

== See also ==
- List of links golf courses
