= Brynteg, Anglesey =

Village in Anglesey, Wales

Coordinates: 53°19′08″N 04°15′37″W

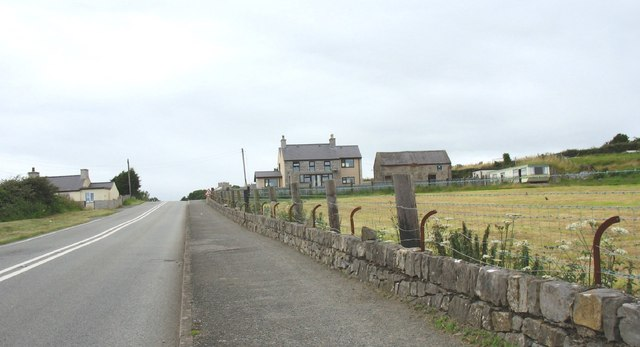
The B5108 on the southern outskirts of Brynteg, Anglesey

Brynteg (Welsh pronunciation) is a crossroads village on the Isle of Anglesey, North Wales. It is part of the community of Llanfair-Mathafarn-Eithaf.

== Description ==
Brynteg is located on the east of the island on the B5108 and B5110 roads due west of the coastal resort of Benllech.

During October 2013 the residents of Brynteg were invited to vote for changing the name of the village to Rhosfawr. The results of this vote was 19 for the proposal and 34 against.

In 2014, Brynteg was rated one of the most attractive postcode areas to live in Wales.

== Transport ==
The bus routes 50, 55 and 63 run within the village. Route 50 runs from Llangefni to Beaumaris and vice versa. Route 55 is a linear route from Llangefni via Talwrn and Pentraeth and vice versa. Route 63 runs from Llanerch-y-medd to Bangor.

== Governance ==
Prior to the Isle of Anglesey (Electoral Arrangements) Order 2012 Brynteg gave its name to an electoral ward of the island's county council. The population of this ward taken at the 2011 Census was 1,869. The ward subsequently became part of the new multi-councillor ward of Lligwy.

== Notable people ==
- Howel Harris Hughes (1873–1956), theologian, Presbyterian minister and Principal of the United Theological College in Aberystwyth was born in the village.
- Aled Owen (1934–2022), Ipswich Town and Wrexham winger.

== See also ==
- Storws Wen Golf Club
