= Denbigh Golf Club =

Welsh golf club

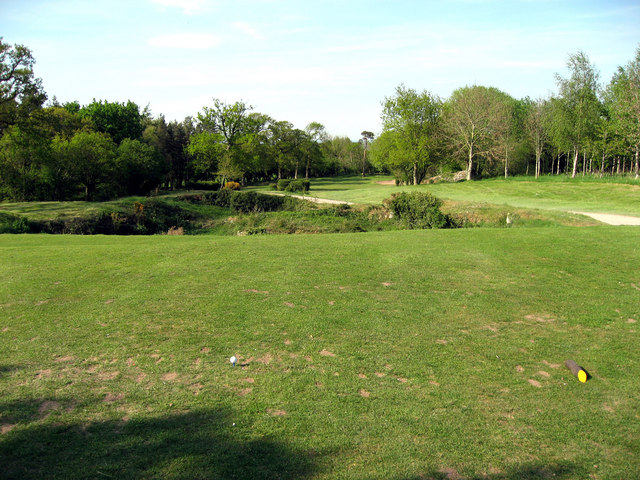

- Denbigh Golf Club within Wales
- 53.19628°N 3.436856°W

Club information
- Location: Denbighshire, Wales
- Established: 1908
- Type: Golf Club
- Total holes: 18
- Website: denbighgolfclub.co.uk
- Par: 69
- Length: 5519 yards

Denbigh Golf Club (Welsh: Clwb Golff Dinbych) is a golf club based just outside Denbigh at Denbighshire, Wales. It is an 18-hole parkland course with mature trees. Their "Pay and Play" course is available to non-members.

In 2009 a father and son each had a hole-in-one at the club and the odds were said to be 13,000-1. The first lady member to be appointed club president was in 2013, after 105 years of male presidents.
