= Nefyn and District Golf Club =

Nefyn & District Golf Club
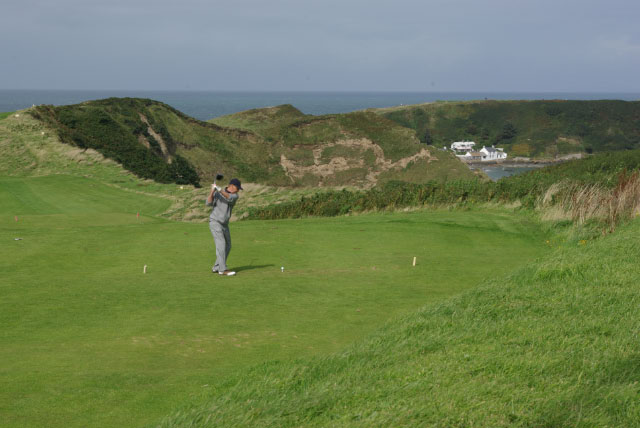

- Nefyn & District Golf Club within Wales
- 52.93704°N 4.567559°W

Club information
- Location: Gwynedd, Wales
- Established: 1907
- Type: Golf Club
- Tota holes: 27
- Website: http://nefyn-golf-club.co.uk/
- Par: 71
- Length: 6138 - 6548 yards

Clwb Golff Nefyn Golf Club is a golf club based in Morfa Nefyn, Pwllheli, Gwynedd, North Wales. The course has 27 holes, with a view of the sea from every tee; nine holes are played on the world-famous "Point". It is set high on the sea cliffs of the narrow peninsula overlooking Porthdinllaen bay. This club is open to visitors all year round.

Ian Woosnam ranks it among his favourites and holds the club record with a 67. The club was formed in 1907. The course added a further 9 holes in 1912 and a third set of 9 holes in 1933. The course was then made up of a front Ten with a choice of two back eight's.

The peninsula holes were damaged by storms in 2013 damaging almost all the greens with salt water. The peninsula holes were closed for almost 18 months while the holes were redeveloped. This left nine new peninsula holes and a further two nine-hole loops which was reopened in April 2015. The course now has 27 holes.

The course has been used in Visit Wales tourist board TV adverts. Visiting golfers and walkers also visit the Ty Coch Inn.
