= Abersoch Golf Club =

Golf club in Abersoch, Gwynedd, Wales

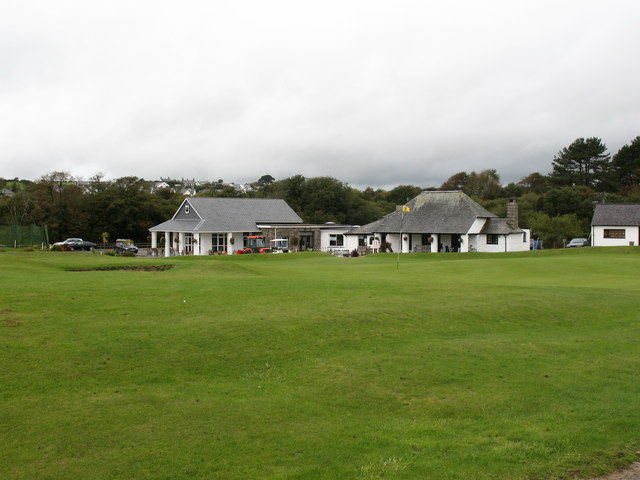

- Abersoch Golf Club within Wales
- 52.81506°N 4.504432°W

Club information
- Location: Gwynedd, Wales
- Established: Boxing Day 1907
- Type: Golf Club
- Tota holes: 18
- Website: abersochgolf.co.uk
- Par: 69
- Length: 5847 yard

Abersoch Golf Club (Welsh: Clwb Golff Abersoch) is a golf club based just outside Abersoch at Gwynedd, Wales. This 18-hole course has a mixture of both links and parkland. The club was founded on Boxing Day 1907 and designed by Harry Vardon.
