= Rhyl Golf Club =

Golf club in Wales

- Rhyl Golf Club within Wales
- 53.32679°N 3.474306°W

Club information
- Location: Denbighshire, Wales
- Established: 1890
- Type: Golf Club
- Tota holes: 9
- Website: rhylgolfclub.co.uk
- Par: 71

Rhyl Golf Club (Welsh: Clwb Golff Rhyl) is a golf club based on the outskirts of Rhyl at Denbighshire, Wales. It is a 9-hole course (links). In 2010 the club undertook a £225,000, five-year refurbishment programme. The course is a 9-hole (18 tees) 6315 yards in total and is the only nine-hole links on the north Wales coast.

In December 2013 the course was swamped by floods and part of a wall was washed away. the club has since played a big part in protecting east rhyl with the new flood defences and lagoon

The club's website claims to be "North Wales’ oldest golf club and a founder member of the Golf Union of Wales."
